= Glossary of names for the Tirukkural =

Tirukkural, or the Kural, an ancient Indian treatise on common moralities, has been given by various names ever since its writing between the first century BCE and the 5th century CE. Originally referred to as Muppāl, perhaps as presented by its author Valluvar himself at the ruler's court, the work remains unique among ancient works in that it was not given any title by its author himself. All the names that the work is referred by today are given by later days' scholars over the millennia. The work is known by an estimated 44 names excluding variants, although some scholars list even more. E. S. Ariel, a French scholar of the 19th century who translated the work into French, famously said of the Kural thus: Ce livre sans nom, par un autre sans nom ("The book without a name by an author without a name").

== Etymology ==
Tirukkural was originally known as 'Muppāl', meaning three-sectioned book, as presented by its author himself at the king's court, since it contained three sections, viz., 'Aram', 'Porul' and 'Inbam'. Tolkappiyam divides various types of Tamil poetic forms into two, namely, kuruvenpāttu and neduvenpāttu. Kuruvenpāttu came to be called kural pāttu and, eventually, kural. The word kural applies in general to something that is short or abridged. In the words of Albert Schweitzer, "kural" means short strophe. More specifically, it is a very short Tamil poetic form consisting of two lines, the first line consisting of four words (known as cirs) and the second line consisting of three, which should also conform to the grammar of Venpa. It is one of the most important forms of classical Tamil language poetry. Thiru is a term denoting divine respect, literally meaning 'holy' or 'sacred'. Since the work was written in this poetic form, it came to be known as 'Tirukkural', meaning 'sacred couplets'.

== List of names by which the work is known ==
The following table lists the various names the Kural text has been known by over the millennia.

| S. No. | Name | Literal meaning | Named by | First cited | Notes |
|---|---|---|---|---|---|
| 1 | முப்பால் (Muppāl) | The threefold path | Valluvar (the author) | Tiruvalluva Maalai (c. 7th century CE) | One of the twelve most traditional names. Believed to be the name employed by the author himself during the presentation of the work at the Pandya king's court at Madurai. It is the most used name for the work in the Tiruvalluva Maalai, where it appears in 15 places, including verses 9, 10, 11, 12, 15, 17, 18, 19, 30, 31, 39, 44, 46, 49, and 53, indicating the title of the work. |
| 2 | திருக்குறள் (Tirukkuṛaḷ) | Sacred couplets | Kapilar | Tiruvalluva Maalai (c. 7th century CE) | One of the twelve most traditional names. The chief name of the work used since the Medieval Era. One of the two chief names that the work is known by today. |
| 3 | அறம் (Aṟam); Variant: தமிழறம் (Tamiḻaṟam) | Virtue; Tamil virtue | Alathur Kilar | Purananuru, verse 34 (c. 1st century BCE–5th century CE) | Denotes that the entire work was written keeping virtue as the base. |
| 4 | குறள் (Kuṛaḷ) | The couplets | | | One of the two chief names that the work is known by today. |
| 5 | தெய்வ நூல் (Deiva Nūl); Variant: தெய்வமாமறை (Deyvamāmaṟai) | The divine book | | | One of the twelve most traditional names. Employed by Sodasāvadhānam Subbaraya Chettiyar. |
| 6 | திருவள்ளுவர் (Tiruvalluvar); Variant: வள்ளுவர் (Valluvar) | Saint Valluvar; Valluvar | Traditional | | One of the twelve most traditional names. The book came to be called by the name of its author, which is a traditional Tamil literary practice known as Karuthāgupeyar. Tiruvalluvar was employed by Swaminatha Desikar and Valluvar by Umapathi Shivacchariyar. |
| 7 | பொய்யாமொழி (Poyyāmoḻi) | The infallible words | Velliveedhiyar | Tiruvalluva Maalai, verse 23 (c. 7th century CE) | One of the twelve most traditional names. |
| 8 | வாயுறை வாழ்த்து (Vāyurai Vāḻttu) | Medicinal praise/Words of medicine | Madurai Aruvai Vanigan Ilavettanar | Tiruvalluva Maalai, verse 35 (c. 7th century CE) | One of the twelve most traditional names. |
| 9 | தமிழ் மறை (Tamiḻ Maṟai) | The Tamil Veda | | | One of the twelve most traditional names. Employed by Thyagaraja Chettiyar and in the work of Sivasiva Venba. |
| 10 | பொது மறை (Podhu Maṟai) | The common Veda | Traditional | | One of the twelve most traditional names. The most common alias used of the Kural text. It is also given in English as "The Universal Scripture", "The Universal Veda" and "The Universal Bible". |
| 11 | தமிழ்மனு நூல் (Tamilmanu ṉūl) | The book of Tamil Manu | Traditional | Parimelalhagar's commentary (c. 13th century CE) | One of the twelve most traditional names. |
| 12 | திருவள்ளுவப் பயன் (Tiruvalluva Payan); Variant: வள்ளுவப்பயன் (Valluvappayan) | The fruit of Saint Valluvar | | Yapparunkalakaarikai 40 urai | One of the twelve most traditional names. Employed by Nacchinarkkiniyar, Perundhevanar, and Gunasagarar. |
| 13 | பொருளுரை (Porulurai) | Meaningful speech | Seethalai Sathanaar | Manimekalai, verse 22:61 | |
| 14 | முதுமொழி (Mudhumoḻi); Variant: பழமொழி (Paḻamoḻi) | Ancient words The maxim | Nariveruvu Thalaiyar | Tiruvalluva Maalai, verse 33 (c. 7th century CE) | "Mudhumoḻi" employed in the title of the works Mudhumoḻimel Vaippu and Somesar Mudhumoḻi Venba. "Paḻamoḻi" employed by Arunagirinaadhar in his work Tiruppugal and in Sivisiva Venba. |
| 15 | இரண்டு (Irandu) | The Two | | Perunthogai, verse 1128 | This term is found in the ancient adage ஆலும் வேலும் பல்லுக்குறுதி; நாலும் இரண்டும் சொல்லுக்குறுதி, which literally means "Banyan and neem maintain oral health; Four and Two maintain moral health." (Here "Four" and "Two" refer to the quatrains and couplets of the Naladiyar and the Tirukkural, respectively.) |
| 16 | முப்பானூல் (Muppāṉūl) | The three-part book | | | |
| 17 | ஒன்றே முக்காலடி (Onrae Mukkāladi); Variant: ஈரடி நூல் (Iradi ṉūl) | The one-and-three-quarter feet The two-lined book | | | |
| 18 | வள்ளுவம் (Valluvam) | Valluvarism | | | The most common name used in literary sense today. |
| 19 | இயற்றமிழ் முதமொழி (Iyattramiḻ Mudhamoḻi) | | | | |
| 20 | உள்ளிருள் நீக்கும் ஒளி (Ullirul Neekkum Oli); Variant: உள்ளிருள் நீக்கும் விளக்கு (Ullirul Neekkum Vilakku) | Light that disperses the internal darkness | Nappalatthanar | Tiruvalluva Maalai, verse 47 (c. 7th century CE) | |
| 21 | மெய்ஞ்ஞான முப்பால் (Meigyāna Muppāl) | The three divisions of divine knowledge | | | |
| 22 | இருவினைக்கு மாமருந்து (Iruvinaikku Māmarundhu) | Panacea for the karmic dyad | | | |
| 23 | வள்ளுவர் வாய்மொழி (Valluvar Vāimoḻi); Variant: வள்ளுவன் வாய்ச்சொல் (Valluvan Vāicchol) | The words out of Valluvar's mouth | Mangudi Marudhanar and Seyalur Kodum Senkannanar (Valluvar Vāimoḻi); Iraiyanar (Valluvan Vāicchol) | Tiruvalluva Maalai, verses 24 and 42 (Valluvar Vāimoḻi); verse 3 (Valluvan Vāicchol) (c. 7th century CE) | Valluvar Vāimoḻi also employed in verse 1539 of the Perunthogai praising Parimelalhagar's commentary. |
| 24 | மெய்வைத்த வேதவிளக்கு (Meivaittha Vedavilakku) | The vedic light that laid down the truth | | | |
| 25 | தகவினார் உரை (Thagavinār Urai) | | | | |
| 26 | பால்முறை (Pālmurai) | The divided dictum | Kovoor Kilar | Tiruvalluva Maalai, verse 38 (c. 7th century CE) | |
| 27 | வள்ளுவமாலை (Valluvamālai) | The garland of Valluvar | | | One of the twelve most traditional names. Employed by Venkata Subba Bharathiyar in his work Prabhandha Deepikai. |
| 28 | வள்ளுவதேவன் வசனம் (Valluva Daevan Vasanam) | The dialogue of Lord Valluvar | | Perunthogai, verse 2001 | |
| 29 | உலகு உவக்கும் நன்னூல் (Ulagu Uvakkum Nanṉūl) | | | | |
| 30 | வள்ளுவனார் வைப்பு (Valluvanār Vaippu) | The laying on by Valluvar or the treasure of Valluvar | | Perunthogai, verse 1999 | |
| 31 | திருவாரம் (Tiruvāram) | | | | |
| 32 | மெய்வைத்த சொல் (Meivaittha Sol) | Word(s) that established the truth | | | |
| 33 | வான்மறை (Vaanmarai) | The cosmic Veda | | | |
| 34 | பிணைக்கிலா வாய்மொழி (Pinaikkilā Vāimoḻi) | | | | |
| 35 | வித்தக நூல் (Vitthaga ṉūl) | The doyen literature | | | |
| 36 | ஓத்து (Otthu) | The Veda | | | |
| 37 | புகழ்ச்சி நூல் (Pughaḻcchi ṉūl) | The famed book | | | |
| 38 | குறளமுது (Kuṛaḷamudhu) | The Kural ambrosia | | | |
| 39 | உத்தரவேதம் (Uttharavedham) | The final, ultimate Veda | | | One of the twelve most traditional names. |
| 40 | வள்ளுவதேவர் வாய்மை (Valluvadevar Vāimai) | The truth of Lord Valluvar | | | |
| 41 | கட்டுரை (Katturai) | The treatise | | | |
| 42 | திருமுறை (Tirumurai) | The divine path | | | |
| 43 | வள்ளுவர் வாக்கு (Valluvar Vākku); Variant: திருவள்ளுவன் வாக்கு (Tiruvalluvan Vākku) | The saying(s) of Valluvar | | | |
| 44 | எழுதுண்ட மறை (Eḻudhunda Marai) | The written Veda | Kambar | Kamba Ramayanam (c. 12th century CE) | |

== See also ==
- Impact of Tirukkural
