= Arisil Kilar =

Tamil poet of the Sangam period

Arisil Kilar (Tamil: அரிசில் கிழார்) was a Tamil poet of the Sangam period. He has authored 20 verses in the Sangam literature, including verse 13 of the Tiruvalluva Maalai.

== Biography ==
Arisil Kilar hailed from Ariyilur and belonged to the Vellalar caste. His name was prefixed with "Arisil" since he lived on the banks of river Arisil near Kumbakonam. He was from the period of the last seven great patrons of the Tamil land. The King Thagadur Erindha Perum Cheral Irumporai bestowed 900,000 kaanam as prize upon him for writing ten verses of the Pathitrupatthu, and also made him a minister in his court. He is also believed to have penned verses of the Thagadur Yathrai. He is a contemporary of Kapilar, Paranar, Perunkunrur Kilar and Ponmudiyar. He is also known for his kindness act when he helped king Vaiyāvik Kōpperum Pēkan reunite with his wife.

== Contribution to the Sangam literature ==
Arisil Kilar has written twenty Sangam verses in all, including seven in Purananuru, one in Kurunthogai, ten in Pathitrupatthu, one in Thagadur Yaathirai, and one (verse 13) of the Tiruvalluva Maalai.

=== Views on Valluvar and the Kural ===
Arisil Kilar opines about Valluvar and the Kural text thus:

Who but Valluvar is able to separate, according to their order, all the things blended together in the Vēdas, and impart them to the world in a condensed form and with due amplification?

== See also ==
- Sangam literature
- List of Sangam poets
- Tiruvalluva Maalai
