= Kalladar =

Poet of the Sangam period

Kalladar (Tamil: கல்லாடர்), also known as Kalladanar (Tamil: கல்லாடனார்), was a poet of the Sangam period, known for authoring 14 verses of the Sangam literature, besides verse 9 of the Tiruvalluva Maalai.

== Biography ==
Kalladar hailed from a town called Kalladam (hence the name 'Kalladar'), which is in the modern-day Kerala. Rulers sung by Kalladar include Ambarkilan Aruvandhai, Mullur king Kari, Ori, Akdhai, Pandiyan Thalaiyalangaanatthu Seruvendra Neduncheliyan, Venkatamalai ruler Kalvar Koman Pulli, Poraiyatru Kilan Periyan, Nannan, and Kalangaai Kanni Narmudicheral. Other poets who also sung about the Pandiyan King Thalaiyalangaanatthu Seruvendra Neduncheliyan, including Kudapulaviyanar, Mangudi Kilar, and Mangudi Marudhanar, were thus his contemporaries. With his friendship with Mamulanar, he formed part of the Kallada–Mamulanar dyad.

== Contribution to the Sangam literature ==
Kalladar has written verses in Kurunthogai (verses 260 and 269), Agananuru (verses 9, 63, 113, 171, 199, 209, 333), and Purananuru (verses 23, 25, 371, 385, 391). The chief themes that Kalladar handled in his verses include battlefield, consequences of battles, and the plights of widows of the slain soldiers. He has also composed verse 9 of the Tiruvalluva Maalai. But this Kalladar is likely to be a namesake who wrote these verses in venba meter, centuries after the Sangam period. He is also believed to have written a commentary on the Tolkappiyam.

A later work of Kallaadam, unlike one would guess, was not authored by Kalladar. The Tamil land must have seen at least three Kalladars, if not four.

=== Views on Valluvar and the Kural ===
Kalladar opines about Valluvar and the Kural text thus:

Of the six sects, one will condemn the system of the other; but none of them will condemn the system propounded by Valluvar in his Cural: it has the merit of harmonizing the opinions of them all, so that each sect would admit it to be its own. [Emphasis in original]

== See also ==
- Sangam literature
- List of Sangam poets
- Tiruvalluva Maalai
