= Mosikeeranar =

Poet of the Sangam period

Mōsi Keeranār (Tamil: மோசிகீரனார்) was a poet of the Sangam period, to whom 10 verses of the Sangam literature have been attributed, including verse 27 of the Tiruvalluva Maalai.

== Biography ==
Mosikeeranar hailed from Mosur in Thondainadu. Keeran is his familial name. Mosikeeranar was said to be the contemporary of the Chera ruler Thagadoor Erindha Peruncheral Irumporai. He was known as the poet who mistakenly slept on the murasukattil (giant drum cot) of the ruler.

== Contribution to the Sangam literature ==
Mosikeeranar has written 9 verses, including 1 in Agananuru (verse 392), 2 in Kurunthogai (verses 59 and 84), 1 in Natrinai, and 5 in Purananuru, besides the one in Tiruvalluva Maalai.

== See also ==
- Sangam literature
- List of Sangam poets
- Tiruvalluva Maalai
