= Velliveedhiyar =

Poet of the late Sangam period

Velliveethiyār (Tamil: வெள்ளிவீதியார்), also Velli Vitiyar, was a poet of the late Sangam period, to whom 14 verses of the Sangam literature have been attributed, including verse 23 of the Tiruvalluva Maalai.

== Biography ==
Velliveedhiyar hailed from the Pandya Kingdom. She lived in the Velliambala Veedhi area of Madurai and came to be known thus. She remained separated from her husband, who left her and spent her remaining life in search of him. Many of her verses reflected her poignant lived experience. The verses are rife with feministic psychological thoughts. Verses in Agananuru nos. 45 and 362 describes Athimanthi's quest of her husband and the battle that ensued on the lopping off by Anni of Thithian's branches of punnai in Kurukkai field and Vanavaramban's power in destroying fortresses. Velliveeedhiyar is also praised for her simile of the tiger's nail to the deep-rd murukku-bud. She has been described by Avvaiyar, who described her quest of her husband and her tribulations.

== Contribution to the Sangam literature ==
Velliveedhiyar has written 14 Sangam verses, including 8 in Kurunthogai (verses 27, 44, 58, 130, 146, 149, 169, and 386), 3 in Natrinai (verses 70, 335, and 348), 2 in Agananuru (verses 45 and 362), and 1 in Tiruvalluva Maalai (verse 23). Her verse no. 23 in praise of the Kural is oft-quoted.

== See also ==
- List of Sangam poets
- Sangam literature
- Tiruvalluva Maalai
