= Alangudi Vanganar =

Poet of the Sangam period

Alangudi Vanganar (Tamil: ஆலங்குடி வங்கனார்) was a poet of the Sangam period, to whom 8 verses of the Sangam literature have been attributed, including verse 53 of the Tiruvalluva Maalai.

== Biography ==
Alangudi Vanganar hailed from Alangudi in Pudukottai district in Tamil Nadu. He was said to be involved in maritime trade and hence acquired the name 'Vanganar', which means the one related to ships.

== Contribution to the Sangam literature ==
Alangudi Vanganar has written 8 verses, including 2 in Kurunthogai, 3 in Natrinai, 1 each in Agananuru and Purananuru, and 1 in Tiruvalluva Maalai.

=== Views on Valluvar and the Kural ===
Alangudi Vanganar opines about Valluvar and the Kural text thus:

The gods have known the taste of ambrosia by having partaken of it; but men will know it when they imbibe the milk issuing from the three teats (parts) of the Cural. [Emphasis in original]

== See also ==
- Sangam literature
- List of Sangam poets
- Tiruvalluva Maalai
