= Arts in Karur =

Karur is mentioned in a number of old Tamil works of literature.

== Poets of Karuvur ==
Among the Sangam poets, who were two groups of poets deserve attention (a) those who hailed from Karur and (b) those who sang Karuvur and the ruling Chera. A large number of poets have hailed from Karuvur and their poems are seen in Kuruntokai, Ahananuru, Narrinai, and Purananuru. The following are the poets.

- Karuvur Kilar - Kuruntokai 170.
- Karuvur Kannampalanar - Ahananuru 180, 263, Narrinai 148.
- Karuvur Katappillai Cattanar - Ahananuru 309, Narrinai 343, Puram 168.
- Karuvur Kalingattar - Ahananuru 183.
- Karuvur Kosanar - Narrinai 214.
- Karuvur Cheraman Cattan - Kuruntokai 268.
- Karuvur Nanmarbanar - Aham 217.
- Karuvur Bhutam Cattanar - Aham 50.
- Karuvur Pauttiranar - Kuruntokai 162.
- Karuvur Perum Catukkattu Bhuta nathanar - Puram 219.

Another point of great interest is that all of them took the title Karuvur and none claimed Vanci, though they themselves sang Vanci. Among the poems that extol the Cheras, the Patirru Pattu(21) collection of verses occupies an important position as each group of ten verses is dedicated to one Chera ruler.
