= Madurai Aruvai Vanigan Ilavettanar =

Poet of the Sangam period

Madurai Aruvai Vanigan Ilavettanar (Tamil: மதுரை அறுவை வாணிகன் இளவேட்டனார்) was a poet of the Sangam period, to whom 13 verses of the Sangam literature have been attributed, including verse 35 of the Tiruvalluva Maalai. It is his verse in Tiruvalluva Maalai that bestowed the Kural with the name Vaayurai Vaalthu.

== Biography ==
Madurai Aruvai Vanigan Ilavettanar was a textile merchant from the city of Madurai.

== Contribution to the Sangam literature ==
Madurai Aruvai Vanigan Ilavettanar has written 13 verses, including 1 in Kurunthogai, 4 in Natrinai, 6 in Agananuru, 1 in Purananuru, and 1 in Tiruvalluva Maalai.

== See also ==
- Sangam literature
- List of Sangam poets
- Tiruvalluva Maalai
