= Pandiyan Ukkira Peruvaludhi =

King and poet of the Sangam period

Pandiyan Ukkira Peruvazhludhiyar (Tamil: பாண்டியன் உக்கிரப் பெருவழுதியார்) was a king and poet belonging to the Sangam period, to whom 3 verses of the Sangam literature have been attributed, including verse 4 of the Tiruvalluva Maalai. He was also the chancellor of the Third Sangam.

== Biography ==
Ukkira Peruvaludhi was a ruler of the Pandyan dynasty and a patron of the late Sangam. He defeated Vengaimarbhan, the king of Gaanapereyil or Kalaiyar Koil, and hence came to be known as "Pandiyan Gaanapereyil Thandha Ukkira Peruvaludhi". He was the ally of the Chera King Mavenko and Rajasooyam Vetta Perunar Killi. The Sangam work of Agananuru is believed to have compiled in his court. He was also the chancellor of the third academy in Madura, known as the Third Sangam.

== Contribution to the Sangam literature ==
Ukkira Peruvaludhi has written 3 verses, including 1 in Natrinai (verse 98), 1 in Agananuru (verse 26), and 1 in Tiruvalluva Maalai (verse 4).

=== Views on Valluvar and the Kural ===
Ukkira Peruvaludhi opines about Valluvar and the Kural text thus:

The Four-faced (Brahma), disguising himself as Valluvar, has imparted the truths of the four Vēdas in the three parts of the Cural, which is therefore to be adored by the head, praised by the mouth, pondered by the mind, and heard by the ears. [Emphasis in original]

== See also ==
- Sangam literature
- List of Sangam poets
- Tiruvalluva Maalai
