= Mangudi Marudhanar =

Poet of the Sangam period

Māngudi Maruthanār, also known as Mānkudi Kilār, Madhurai Kānchi Pulavar, and Kānchi Pulavanār, was a poet of the Sangam period, to whom 13 verses of the Sangam literature have been attributed, including verse 24 of the Tiruvalluva Maalai. He was the author of Madurai Kaanchi of the Pathupattu (the Ten Idylls).

== Biography ==
Mangudi Marudhanar hailed from the town of Mangudi and belonged to the Vellan caste.

== Contribution to the Sangam literature ==
Mangudi Marudhanar wrote the Madurai Kaanchi literature of the Pathupattu (the Ten Idylls). Besides he has written 13 Sangam verses, including 3 in Kurunthogai, 2 in Natrinai, 6 in Purananuru, 1 in Agananuru, and 1 in Tiruvalluva Maalai.

=== Views on Valluvar and the Kural ===
Mangudi Marudhanar opines about Valluvar and the Kural text thus:

The beauty of Valluvar’s Cural is, that it not only illustrates the abstruse doctrines of the Vēdas, but is itself a Vēda, easy to be studied, and having the effect of melting the hearts of the righteous who study it. [Emphasis in original]

== See also ==
- Sangam literature
- List of Sangam poets
- Tiruvalluva Maalai
