= Madurai Aasiriyar Nallanthuvanar =

Poet of the Sangam period

Nallanthuvanar (Tamil: நல்லந்துவனார்), also known in full as Madurai Aasiriyar Nallanthuvanar (Tamil: மதுரையாசிரியர் நல்லந்துவனார்), was a poet of the Sangam period, to whom 39 verses of the Sangam literature has been attributed, in addition to verse 18 of the Tiruvalluva Maalai.

== Biography ==
Nallanthuvanar was born as "Anthuvan" and was known for his erudition in Tamil language and astronomy. He was praised by poet Madurai Marudhan Ilanaganar.

== Contribution to the Sangam literature ==
Nallanthuvanar has written 39 Sangam verse, including 4 in Paripaadal (verses 6, 8, 11, and 20), 1 in Agananuru (verse 43), 1 in Natrinai (verse 88), and 33 in Kalithogai, besides verse 18 of the Tiruvalluva Maalai. In addition to composing the Kalithogai verses, he also compiled the work of Kalithogai and wrote its invocation verse.

== See also ==
- Sangam literature
- List of Sangam poets
- Tiruvalluva Maalai
