= Uraiyur Mudhukootthanar =

Poet of the Sangam period

Uraiyur Mudhukootthanar (Tamil: உறையூர் முதுகூத்தனார்), also known as Uraiyur Mudhukootranar, was a poet of the Sangam period, to whom 9 verses of the Sangam literature have been attributed, including verse 39 of the Tiruvalluva Maalai.

== Biography ==
Uraiyur Mudhukootthanar hailed from Uraiyur and was known for his patriotism.

== Contribution to the Sangam literature ==
Uraiyur Mudhukootthanar has penned 9 Sangam verses, including 2 in Kurunthogai, 3 in Agananuru, 1 in Purananuru, and 1 in Tiruvalluva Maalai.

=== Views on Valluvar and the Kural ===
Uraiyur Mudhukootthanar opines about Valluvar and the Kural text thus:

They who have not studied the Cural of the divine Valluvar are incapable of good actions: neither their tongues have expressed what is sweet in language, nor their minds understood what is sublime in sense. [Emphasis in original]

== See also ==
- Sangam literature
- List of Sangam poets
- Tiruvalluva Maalai
