= Avvaiyar (Sangam poet) =

Tamil Poet

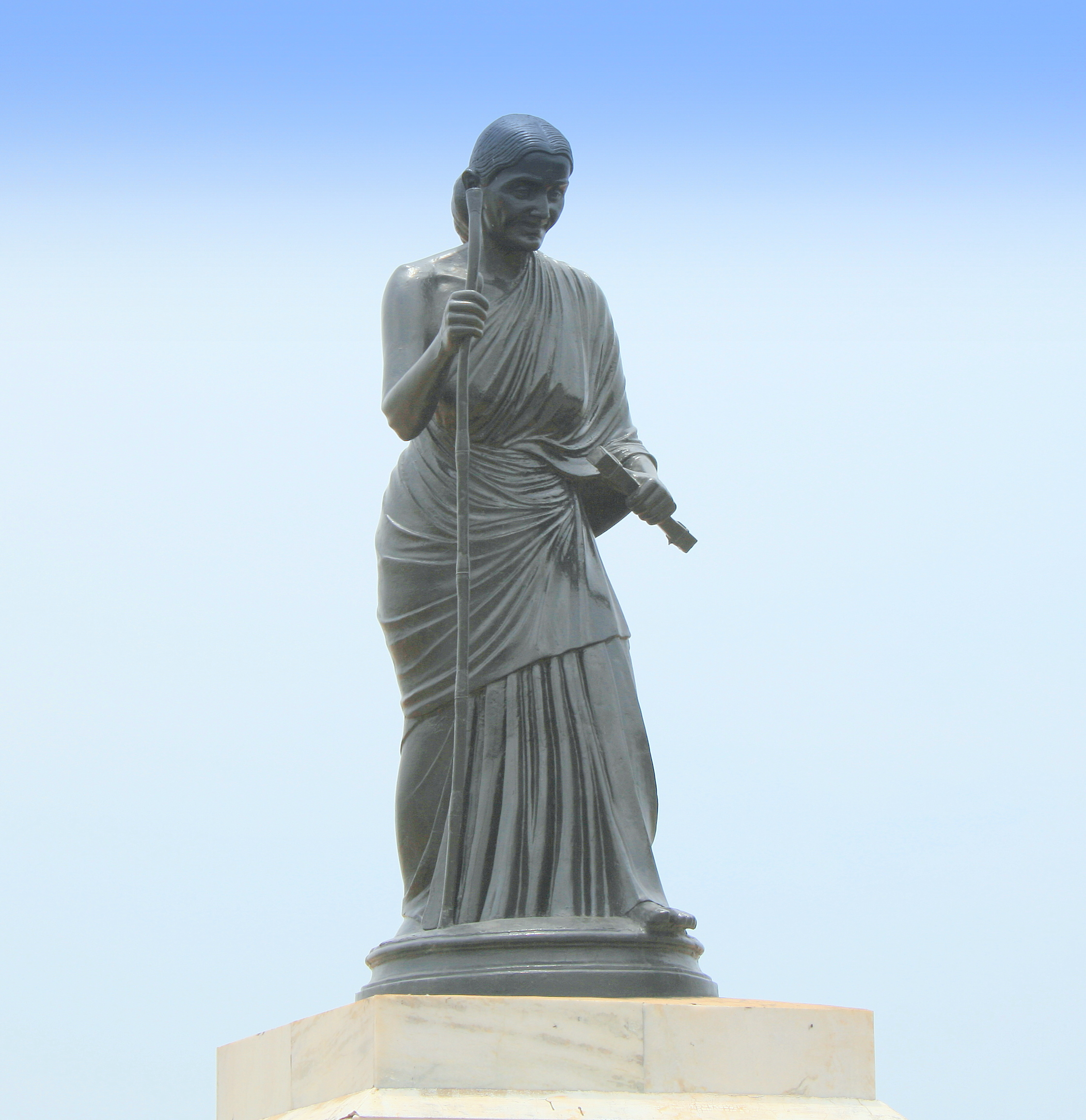
Statue of Avvaiyar at Marina Beach, Chennai

Avvaiyar (Tamil: ஔவையார்) was a Tamil poet who lived during the Sangam period. She wrote 59 poems in the Puṟanāṉūṟu. and is said to have had cordial relations with the Tamil chieftains Vēl Pāri and Athiyamān. A plaque on a statue of the poet in Chennai suggests the first century BCE for her birthdate. The name Avvaiyar in Tamil is defined as a respectable good woman and was considered an honorific. Her given name is not known.

== Biography ==
Avvaiyar is considered to be contemporary to poets Paranar, Kabilar and Thiruvalluvar. She is attributed as the author of 7 verses in Naṟṟiṇai, 15 in Kuṟuntokai, 4 in Akanaṉūṟu and 33 in Puṟanāṉūṟu. Legend states that she was a court poet of the rulers of the Tamil country. She travelled from one part of the country to another and from one village to another, sharing the gruel of the poor farmers and composing songs for their enjoyment. Most of her songs were about a small-time chieftain Vallal Athiyamaan Nedumaan Anji and his family. The chieftain had also used her as his ambassador to avert war with another neighbouring chieftain Thondaiman. The rest of her songs related to the various aspects of state governance. Although traditions claim that she was a sister of Kabilar, Thiruvalluvar and Athiyamaan, V. R. Ramachandra Dikshitar refutes this claim based on his studies that all four of them were most likely of different walks of life, thus from different caste backgrounds and hence impossible to be siblings.

=== View on Valluvar and the Kural ===
It is said that Avvaiyar was one of the several scholars who were present at the time when Valluvar submitted his masterpiece of the Tirukkural at the Madurai College. Soon after the presentation and the subsequent acceptance by the scholars and the Pandiyan King, Idaikkadar praised Valluvar and the Kural text thus:

The Cural contains much in a little compass. Such is the ingenuity of its author, that he has compressed within its narrow limits all the branches of knowledge, as if he had hollowed a mustard seed, and enclosed all the waters of the seven seas in it. [Emphasis in original]

On hearing this, Avvaiyar remarked to him that it would be more appropriate to liken the Kural text to an atom, which is even smaller than a mustard seed. Both Idaikaadar and Avvaiyar's remarks appear as the last two verses of the Tiruvalluva Maalai.

== Legend ==
A popular legend in Tamil is the story of the Avvaiyar and the Naaval (Jambu) tree. Avvaiyar, believing she had achieved everything that is to be achieved, was pondering her retirement from Tamil literary work while resting under a Naaval tree. She was then met by a disguised Murugan (regarded as one of the guardian deities of the Tamil language; the god of war, victory, and knowledge), who jousted with her wittily. He later revealed himself and made her realise that there was still a lot more to be done and learned.

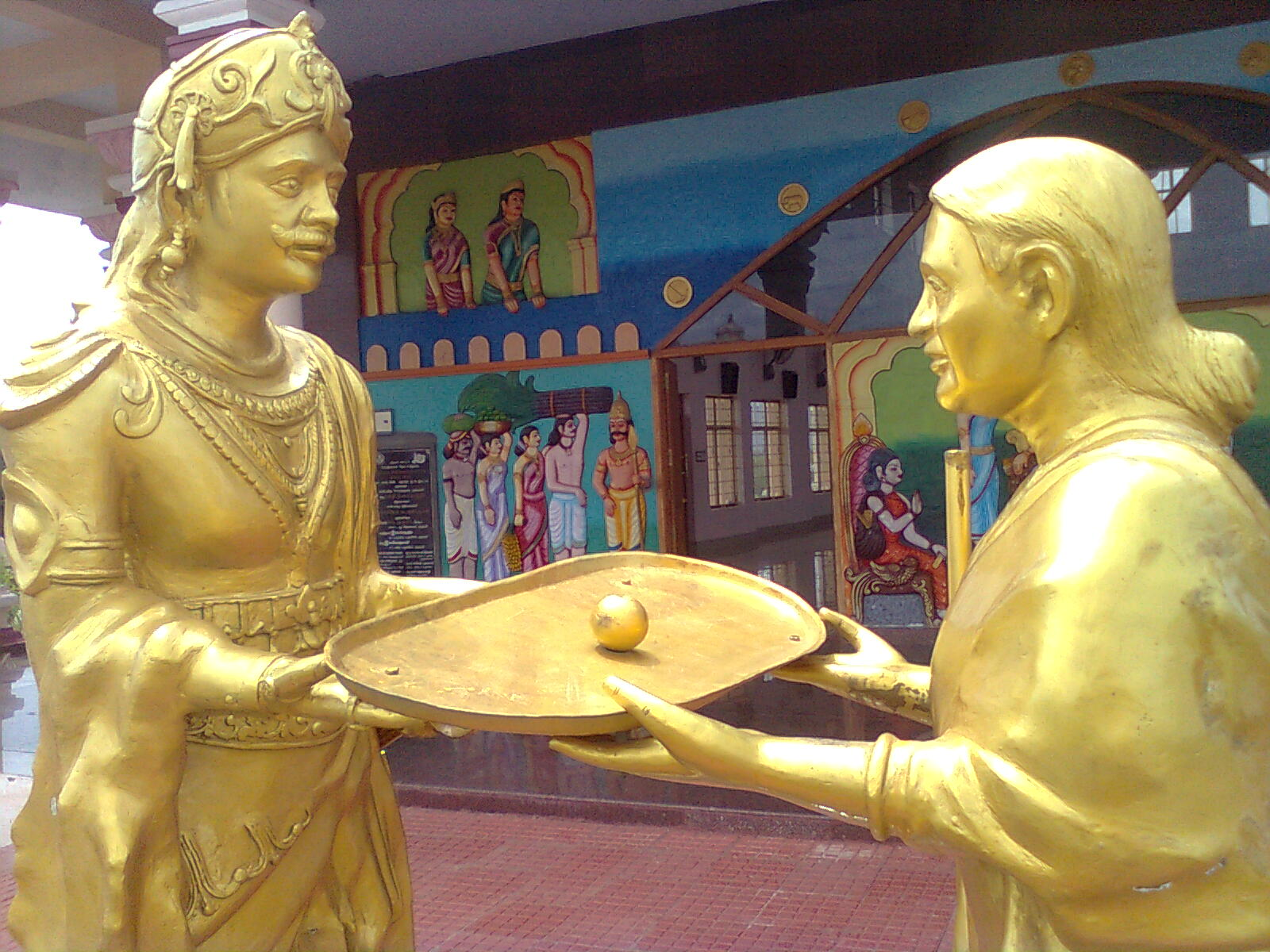
Athiyamān Nedumān Añci offering a rare gooseberry to Avvaiyar

Another legend has it that once the great king Athiyaman gave an "eternal" gooseberry (Nellikani in Tamil) fruit to Avvaiyar. It was a special fruit that would bestow on whoever ate it a very long and healthy life. Athiyaman wanted Avvaiyar to eat the eternal fruit as she was the right person who could serve the Tamil community. If she could live forever, so would the Tamil heritage and language.

While on a visit to Ceylon, Avvai was caught up in torrential rain, and took shelter in the house of two women of lower caste, Angavay and Sangavay. These women took care of Avvai with great kindness and the poet promised that they would be given in marriage to the King of Tirucovalur. On hearing this the King agreed to take the women in marriage if they were given away by the Chera, Chola and the Pandya kings.

== Shrine ==
In Muppandal, a small village in the Kanyakumari District of Tamil Nadu. there is an image of Avvaiyar. By tradition, this is stated to be the spot where the great poet left the mortal world.

== Legacy ==
In 1991, a 20.6 km-wide crater in Venus was named the Avviyar crater by the International Astronomical Union.

Her quote "கற்றது கைமண் அளவு, கல்லாதது உலகளவு" has been translated as "What you have learned is a mere handful; What you haven't learned is the size of the world" and included in NASA's Cosmic Questions Exhibit.

== See also ==
- List of Sangam poets
- Sangam literature
- Tiruvalluva Maalai
