= Mamulanar =

Poet of the Sangam period

Mamulanar (Tamil: மாமூலனார்) was a poet of the Sangam period, to whom 31 verses of the Sangam literature have been attributed, including verse 8 of the Tiruvalluva Maalai.

== Biography ==
Manulanar belonged to the Brahmin caste. Mamulanar has described about the destruction of Pataliputra by River Ganges. However, there was no mention about the event of Patalipura fire of the 1st century CE. These suggest that Mamulanar lived no later than the 1st century BCE. Also, his writing about the Mauryas and Nandas indicated that he must have lived before 320 BCE. All his writings are known to contain historical information.

== Contribution to the Sangam literature ==
Mamulanar has written 31 verses, including 1 in Kurunthogai (verse 11), 2 in Natrinai, 27 in Agananuru, and 1 in Tiruvalluva Maalai.

=== Views on Valluvar and the Kural ===
Mamulanar opines about Valluvar and the Kural text thus:

Valluvar is in reality a god; and if any shall say that he is a mere mortal, not only will the learned reject his saying, but take him for an ignorant man.

== See also ==
- Sangam literature
- List of Sangam poets
- Tiruvalluva Maalai
