= Neṭunalvāṭai =

Ancient Tamil poem

- by Nakkirar I (Son of Madurai Kanakayar)
- Original title: நெடுநல்வாடை
- Written: Around 100 BCE
- Language: Tamil
- Genres: Romance; War; Betrayal; Despondency
- Meter: Akaval/Asiriyapa
- Lines: 188

Neṭunalvāṭai (Tamil: நெடுநல்வாடை, (pronounced as ˈnedʊ' nəl' vədaɪ) lit. "good long north wind", metonymically "cold season") is an ancient Tamil poetry belonging to the Sangam literature era. (Note: According to Kiruṭṭin̲an̲, Neṭunalvāṭai means the "long pleasant breeze of winter".) Also referred to as Nedunalvadai, it is a blend of a love and war story, highlighting the pains of separation of a woman i.e., A queen waiting for her beloved Protagonist i.e., The king to return from the distant war. Authored by Nakkeerar, it is the seventh poem in the Pattuppāṭṭu anthology. The poem is generally dated to the late classical period (2nd to 4th century CE).

Nedunalvadai contains 188 lines of poetry in the akaval metre. It is a poem of complex and subtle artistic composition, its vividness and language has won it many superlatives, including one by the Tamil literature scholar Kamil Zvelebil, as "the best or one of the best of the lays of the [Sangam] bardic corpus". According to G. John Samuel, the "Netunalvatai belongs to the great corpus of ancient classical erotic poems of the world which include the beautiful love poems of the Grecian world, the Song of Songs of the Hebraic world, the ancient pastoral poems of the Latin literature and the Muktaka poems of the Sanskrit tradition".

== Summary/Poem plot ==
The Main Antagonist of the poem is A pandiyan king Nedunchezhiyan hailed as "Thalai Aalanganathu Seruvendra Nedunchezhiyan" The poem weaves two themes, one of a beautiful palace with a queen inconsolably weeping and missing her husband, another of a chaotic war camp with the Pandya king Netunceliyan busy and attending his injured soldiers. The former is the akam-genre poetry, the latter the puram-genre. The poem neither names the king nor the queen, but this is alluded to by the metaphors and the words that paint where she lives with her attendants (palace) and by the role and achievements of the man who is at the war front. Similarly, the city itself is not explicitly named, but alluded to by the details included. In the Tamil tradition, as linked in a medieval commentary on this poem, the unnamed king is presumed to be Netunceliyan.

The poem paints the Tamil region in the cold season, with the northerly wind and retreating monsoonal rains. The people are described as huddling around fires, people then putting their warmed hands on their cheeks, how animals and birds shiver. Women wear simple clothes and minimal jewelry (wedding bracelets) inside their homes and mansions, as their husbands are away on war. In contrast, on the war front, men are decked up in their protective gear inside their simple tents.

The Netunalvatai verses provide social and cultural information. Musical troupes were accompanied by dancing girls in the city. Women prayed to Korravai goddess in temples seeking the safe return of their husbands (lines 48–52, 185–194). They would light lamps, offer flowers and rice with their prayers. Lines 101–102 suggest that Tamil merchants traded with Greek-Romans (yavanas) for designer lamps.

== See also ==
- Eighteen Greater Texts
- Sangam literature
