= Chithalai Chathanar =

Tamil poet

Satthanar or Chithalai Satthanar (Tamil: சாத்தனார் or சீத்தலைச் சாத்தனார், cītalai cāttanār) was the Tamil poet who composed the epic Manimekalai. A total of 11 verses of the Sangam literature have been attributed to Satthanar, including verse 10 of the Tiruvalluva Maalai.

== Etymology ==
Pronounced Sa-tha-naar, the name is derived from (Tamil: சாத்து, sāttu) meaning Buddhist monk. Applying this principle to the name Maturai Kulavāṇikan Cāttan, the author of Manimekalai, we see that the two appellations Maturai and Kulavanikan were prefixed to his name in order to distinguish him from another poet of Maturai with the same name and from a third who lived elsewhere. Several examples could be cited of this system of nomenclature which prevailed during the early days.

== Biography ==
Satthanar hailed from a place known as Seerthandalai, later came to be known as Seethalai. He was a grain merchant at Madurai and hence came to be called "Kōlavānīgan" (Grain-Merchant). He was a contemporary of Cheran Senguttuvan and was believed to have practiced Buddhism. He has sung in praise of the Pandyan king Chittira Maadatthu Thunjiya Nanmaran in the Sangam work of Purananuru.

Vaiyapuri Pillai sees him along with Ilango Adigal as developing two divergent strands of the Chilampu legend that forms the basis for both Cilapatikaram and Manimekalai. He is seen as an expert in both orthodox and heterodox systems of Indian philosophy and as an advocate of Buddhist philosophy. It is seen that Maṇimekhalai was written after the Tirukkural was composed, because there are two verses from the Tirukkural quoted in Manimekalai.

== Contribution to the Sangam literature ==
Satthanar composed the Manimekalai and has authored 11 Sangam verses, including 3 in Natrinai, 5 in Agananuru, and 1 each in Kurunthogai, Purananuru, and Tiruvalluva Maalai.

== See also ==
- Sangam literature
- List of Sangam poets
- Tiruvalluva Maalai
