= Nanpalur Sirumedhaviyar =

Poet of the Sangam period

Nanpalūr Sirumēthāviyār (Tamil: நன்பலூர் சிறு மேதாவியார்) was a poet of the Sangam period, to whom 3 verses of the Sangam literature have been attributed, including verse 20 of the Tiruvalluva Maalai.

== Biography ==
Sirumedhaviyar hailed from the town of Nanpalur. Being highly intellectual at a young age resulted his being called Sirumedhaviyar, which literally means "little genius".

== Contribution to the Sangam literature ==
Sirumedhaviyar has written 3 verses, including 2 in Agananuru (verses 94 and 394) and 1 in Tiruvalluva Maalai. He was the first to divide the Tirukkural into Iyals or subdivisions, which he suggested in his composition of verse 20 of the Tiruvalluva Maalai, which was later followed variously by the Medieval commentators of the Kural text.

== See also ==
- Sangam literature
- List of Sangam poets
- Tiruvalluva Maalai
