= Perunthevanar =

Perunthevanar was a Tamil poet who lived during the Third sangam of Tamil. He is a renowned poet who translated Mahabharata to Tamil.

== Poems and works ==
He had written many poems which was combined in the sangam literature. He had written the poems of Agananuru's 51st poem, Natrinai's 83rd poem and Kurunthokai's 255th poem. He wrote the Kadavul vazhthu for the sangam literatures such as Purananuru, Agananuru, Ainkurunuru, Natrinai etc. Perunthevanar is the great poet who translated Mahabharatha to Tamil. Perunthevanar is also renowned by the Tamils as "Bharatham paadiya Perunthevanar"
