= Nallur Naththathanar =

Naththathanar, also known in full as Nallur Naththathanar or Idaikkali Naattu Nallur Naththathanar (Tamil: இடைக்கழி நாட்டு நல்லூர் நத்தத்தனார்), was a poet of the Sangam period who authored Sirupanatruppadai in the Pattuppattu anthology of the Sangam literature. In addition, verse 16 of the Tiruvalluva Maalai is also attributed to him.

== Biography ==
Naththathanar hailed from the Idaikkali country and is believed to have an excellent knowledge of geography of the ancient Tamil land, including the cities of Madurai, Uraiyur, and Vanchi.

== Contribution to the Sangam literature ==
Naththathanar has composed Sirupanatruppadai, a 269-line poetry in the Achiriyappa meter, under the Pattuppattu anthology. In addition, he has also written verse 16 of the Tiruvalluva Maalai.

== See also ==
- Sangam literature
- List of Sangam poets
- Tiruvalluva Maalai
