= Paranar =

Poet of the Sangam period

Paranar (Tamil: பரணர்) (c. 1st century CE) was a poet of the Sangam period, to whom 84 verses of the Sangam literature have been attributed, besides verse 6 of the Tiruvalluva Maalai.

== Biography ==
Paranar belonged to the Paanar caste. He was the friend of Kapilar and Nakkirar I. He has sung various kings, namely, Kadal Pirakkottiya Senguttuvan, Cholan Uruvapatrer Ilanchet Senni, Cheraman Kadalottiya Velkelu Kuttuvan, Kudakko Neduncheralaadhan, and Cholan Verpatradakkai Perunarkilli.

== Contribution to the Sangam literature ==
Paranar has written about 85 verses, including 17 in Kurunthogai, 12 in Natrinai, 32 in Agananuru, 13 in Purananuru, 10 in Pathitrupathu, and 1 in Tiruvalluva Maalai.

By praising the Chera king Senguttuvan, Paranar received Udambarkaattu Vaari and his son prince Kuttuvan Cheral as 'present'.

=== Views on Valluvar and the Kural ===
Paranar opines about Valluvar and the Kural text thus:

Māl (Vishnu) in his Cural (or dwarfish incarnation) measured the whole earth with his two expanded feet; but Valluvar has measured the thoughts of all mankind with his (stanza of) two short feet. [Emphasis in original]

== See also ==
- Sangam literature
- List of Sangam poets
- Tiruvalluva Maalai
