= Keerandhaiyar =

Poet of the Sangam period

Keerandhaiyar was a poet of the Sangam period, to whom a sole verse of the Sangam literature has been attributed, in addition to verse 19 of the Tiruvalluva Maalai.

== Biography ==
Keerandhaiyar is believed to have belonged to the Brahmin caste of the Keerar tribe, who changed their occupation from yagna to performing arts. These people primarily spoke Sanskrit but have adapted themselves to the Tamil culture and language. He belonged to the Aryan race who had come down south and settled down in the Tamil land since antiquity. There were about 24 poets of the Sangam era who belonged to this tribe, including Nakkirar I and Kanakkaayanar.

== Contribution to the Sangam literature ==
Keerandhaiyar has written a sole Sangam verse, namely, verse 2 of Paripaadal praising Lord Vishnu, besides verse 19 of the Tiruvalluva Maalai in praise of Valluvar.

== See also ==
- List of Sangam poets
