= Perunchithiranar =

Perunchithiranar may refer to:

- Perunchithiranar (Sangam poet), Tamil poet of the Sangam period
- Perunchithiranar (Tamil nationalist) (1933–1995), poet and Tamil nationalist
