= Madurai Perumarudhanar =

Poet of the Sangam period

Madhurai Perumaruthanār (Tamil: மதுரைப் பெருமருதனார்) was a poet of the Sangam period, to whom a single verse of the Sangam literature has been attributed, besides verse 37 of the Tiruvalluva Maalai.

== Biography ==
Madurai Perumarudhanar hailed from the city of Madurai. He is the father of the Sangam poet Madurai Perumarudhu Ilanaganar.

== Contribution to the Sangam literature ==
Madurai Perumarudhanar has written a sole Sangam verse—verse 241 of the Natrinai. Apart from this, he has also composed verse 37 in the Tiruvalluva Maalai.

== See also ==
- Sangam literature
- List of Sangam poets
- Tiruvalluva Maalai
