= Perunthogai =

Anthology of Tamil poems compiled in 1936

Perunthogai பெருந்தொகை
- Author: Various ancient and medieval authors, compiled by M. Raghava Iyengar
- Language: Old and medieval Tamil
- Subject: Various stand-alone Tamil poems
- Genre: Poetry
- Publication date: 1936
- Publication place: India

Perunthogai (Tamil: பெருந்தொகை, literally "great anthology") is an anthology containing 2,214 ancient and medieval Tamil stand-alone poems. It was compiled in 1936 by M. Raghava Iyengar.

== History ==
The Sangam Literature contains many anthologies compiled by ancient scholars, such as the Eight Anthologies comprising poems penned by more than 500 authors, preserving numerous literary treasures from the Antiquity that would have otherwise been lost to the modern reader. However, the same was not the case with several post-Sangam texts, and many were lost in time. Even with the Sangam texts, despite these efforts, the biographical details of most of the ancient Tamil poets, except that of well-known poets such as Sathanar and Kapilar, remain cloudy. After a long hiatus, an anthological work named Tamil Navalar Charithai was compiled between the 16th and 18th centuries, which records rare details about medieval poets such as Koothar and Kambar. However, this work was able to cover only a meager number of the vast literary corpus of the ancient Tamil land, and several poems still remained at large. In the early 20th century, M. Raghava Iyenger began to compile these stand-alone poems from various sources including verbal sources from various scholars; ancient commentaries to works from the Antiquity such as the Tolkappiyam, Yaaparungalam Kaarigai, and Veera Choliyam; various commentaries to ancient and medieval works; and unnamed and unpublished works such as Bharatham, Thagadur Yathirai, and Muthollaayiram Aasiriyamaalai. In all, he compiled about 3,500 stand-alone verses under five sections, namely, Invocation to God, Virtue, Wealth, Love, and Appendix. In 1936, he published the first part containing 2,214 verses in three parts, namely, Invocation to God, Virtue, and Wealth.

== See also ==
- Tamil literature
