= Baratham Paadiya Perundevanar =

Tamil poet

Baratham Paadiya Perundevanar (Tamil: பாரதம் பாடிய பெருந்தேவனார்) was a Medieval Tamil poet of the 9th century CE. Perundevanar was the author of the Bharatha Venba, a 12,000-verse Tamil work on the epic of Mahabharata. He also penned verse 30 of the Tiruvalluva Maalai.

Of the 12,000 verses of the Bharatha Venba, only about 830 remain. Of the 830 remaining verses, 818 were published in 1925 by A. Gopala Iyer. To differentiate Perundevanar from his namesake, Perunthevanar the Sangam-era poet, he came to be known by the name "Baratham Paadiya Perundevanar" (Perundevanar who sang Mahabharata). He reportedly added a God-invoking verse to all the works in Ettuthogai (the Eight anthologies) of the Sangam literature and hence has been credited with compiling those works.

== See also ==
- Sangam literature
- List of Sangam poets
- Tiruvalluva Maalai
