= Saathanar =

Title or name in ancient Tamil literature

- சாத்தனார்
- Occupations: Poet, Philanthropist, Warrior
- Era: Sangam period
- Notable work: Manimekalai

Saathanar (Tamil: சாத்தனார்) is a title or name attributed to several notable individuals in ancient Tamil literature, particularly during the Sangam period. The name "Saathan" was commonly associated with merchants, philanthropists (vallals), warriors, and poets, reflecting a multifaceted role in Tamil society.

== Etymology ==
The term "Saathan" is believed to derive from the Tamil word sāttu (சாத்து), meaning a Buddhist monk or a merchant. This nomenclature was prevalent during the early days to denote individuals associated with Buddhism or trade. For instance, the poet known as Maturai Kulavāṇikan Cāttan (Madurai Grain Merchant Saathanar) was distinguished from others with similar names by his profession and place of residence.

== Notable Figures Named Saathanar ==
=== Chithalai Saathanar ===
Chithalai Saathanar was a renowned Tamil poet credited with composing the epic Manimekalai. He hailed from Seerthandalai (later known as Seethalai) and was a grain merchant in Madurai, earning him the epithet "Kulavāṇikan". A practitioner of Buddhism, his works reflect deep philosophical insights and advocate Buddhist principles.

=== Perunthalai Saathanar ===
Perunthalai Saathanar, a poet from Perunthalayoor near present-day Gobichettipalayam in Erode district, was known for his humility and poetic prowess. In Purananuru verse 209, he praises a chieftain despite not receiving any gifts, showcasing the self-respect of Sangam-era bards.

=== Vannakkan Saathanar ===
Vannakkan Saathanar was a late Sangam period poet known for his erudition in Sanskrit and comparative studies between Tamil and Sanskrit. He authored verse 43 of the Tiruvalluva Maalai, expressing his views on Valluvar and the Tirukkural.

== Other Notable Individuals with the Name Saathanar ==
Several other poets and figures bore the name Saathanar, contributing to Tamil literature:

- Azhisi Nachchaathanar
- Aaduthurai Maasaathanar
- Aalampēri Saathanar
- Uraiyur Kathuvāy Saathanar
- Uraiyur Muthukannan Saathanar
- Okkur Maasaathanar
- Karuvur Kathappillai Saathanar
- Karuvur Cheraman Saathan
- Karuvur Boothan Saathanar
- Seethalai Saathanar
- Seithivalluvan Perun Saathan
- Thondi Aamur Saathanar
- Piraan Saathanar
- Perun Saathanar
- Perunthalai Saathanar
- Perunthōl Kurun Saathan
- Perisaathanar
- Mosi Saathanar

== See also ==
- Sangam literature
- List of Sangam poets
- Manimekalai
- Purananuru
