= Nakkirar =

Nakkirar may refer to:

- Nakkirar I, a Tamil poet of the Sangam period of ancient India
- Nakkirar II, a medieval Indian Tamil poet

== See also ==
- Nakkīraṉãr, a medieval Tamil poet from India
