= Madurai Tamil Koothan Nagan Devanar =

Poet of the Sangam period

Nagan Devanar, known in full as Madurai Tamil Koothan Nagan Devanar (Tamil: மதுரைத் தமிழ்க் கூத்தன் நாகன்தேவனார்), was a poet of the Sangam period, to whom a sole verse of the Sangam literature has been attributed, in addition to verse 12 of the Tiruvalluva Maalai.

== Biography ==
Nagan Devanar was born as "Devanar" and lived in Madurai. He was known for his expertise in the ancient Tamil theatre.

== Contribution to the Sangam literature ==
Nagan Devanar has written a sole Sangam verse—verse 164 of the Agananuru—apart from verse 12 of the Tiruvalluva Maalai.

=== Views on Valluvar and the Kural ===
Nagan Devanar opines about Valluvar and the Kural text thus:

It is no wonder if those who have bathed in the water of a tank abounding with lotus-flowers will not desire to bathe in any other water; but it is a wonder indeed if they who have read Valluvar’s work will desire to read any other work.

== See also ==
- Sangam literature
- List of Sangam poets
- Tiruvalluva Maalai
