= Ponmudiyar =

Poet of the Sangam period

Ponmudiyār (Tamil: பொன்முடியார்) was a poet of the Sangam period, to whom four verses of the Sangam literature have been attributed, including verse 14 of the Tiruvalluva Maalai.

== Biography ==
Ponmudiyar lived during the time of the Chera king Thagadur Erindha Peruncheral Irumporai. She was the well-wisher of the Athiyaman king Nedumananji, who is known for giving an eternal gooseberry fruit to Avvaiyar, and has written in praise of him.

== Contribution to the Sangam literature ==
Ponmudiyar wrote four Sangam verses, including three in Purananuru (verses 299, 310, and 312) and one in Tiruvalluva Maalai (verse 14).

=== Views on Valluvar and the Kural ===
Ponmudiyar opines about Valluvar and the Kural text thus:

It is said that the Cural (meaning Vishnu in his incarnation as a dwarf) produced by Casypa in times of yore measured the earth; but the Cural now produced by Valluvar has measured both the earth and the heaven. [Emphasis in original]

== See also ==
- List of Sangam poets
- Sangam literature
- Tiruvalluva Maalai

== Sources ==
- Edward Jewitt Robinson (2001). Tamil Wisdom: Traditions Concerning Hindu Sages and Selections from Their Writings. New Delhi: Asian Educational Services.
