= Idaikaadar =

Tamil siddhar of the Sangam period

Idaikaadar (Tamil: இடைக்காடர்) was a Tamil siddhar of the Sangam period. He authored verse 54 of the Tiruvalluva Maalai.

== Biography ==
Unlike Idaikaadanar of the Sangam period, who was a poet by profession, Idaikaadar was a siddhar. Idaikaadar hailed from Idaikattur near Madurai. He belongs to the Idaikkali country. He is known for composing poems with excellent exemplifications. He has written in praise of the Chola King Kulamuttratthu Thunjiya Killi Valavan (Purananuru verse 42). He has also authored the grammar text "Oosimuri".

He is believed to have attained jeeva samadhi at Thiruvannamalai. He hosted navagrahas during a famine. A small navagraha temple remains at the site today at Idaikattur.

== Literary contributions ==
Verse 54 of the Tiruvalluva Maalai, an encomium written on Valluvar and the Kural literature, is attributed to Idaikaadar. The verse suggests, "Valluvar pierced a mustard and injected seven seas into it and compressed it into what we have today as Kural." It can be noted that Avvaiyar fortified the meaning of this verse by replacing the first word "mustard" with the word "atom." He is one of the two contributors of the Tiruvalluva Maalai who have penned the verse in the Kural venba metre, the other one being Avvaiyar.

== View on Valluvar and the Kural ==
Idaikkadar opines about Valluvar and the Kural text thus:

The Cural contains much in a little compass. Such is the ingenuity of its author, that he has compressed within its narrow limits all the branches of knowledge, as if he had hollowed a mustard seed, and enclosed all the waters of the seven seas in it. [Emphasis in original]

== See also ==
- Tiruvalluva Maalai
- Sangam literature
- List of Sangam poets
