= Tiruvalluva Malai =

Hagiographic anthology of Valluvar and his work

Tiruvalluva Malai (Tamil: திருவள்ளுவ மாலை, romanized: Tiruvaḷḷuva Mālai, lit. 'Garland of Tiruvalluvar') is an anthology of ancient Tamil paeans containing fifty-five verses each attributed to different poets praising the ancient work of the Kural and its author Tiruvalluvar. With the poets' time spanning across centuries starting from around 1st century CE, the collection is believed to have reached its present form by 10th century CE. With the historical details of the ancient philosopher and his work remaining obscure, much of the legend on the Kural and Tiruvalluvar as they are known today are chiefly from this work. The collection also reveals the name of the author of the Kural text as 'Tiruvalluvar' for the first time, as Tiruvalluvar himself composed the Kural text centuries earlier without indicating his name anywhere in his work. Reminiscing this, E. S. Ariel, a French scholar of the 19th century, famously said of the Tirukkural thus: Ce livre sans nom, par un autre sans nom ("The book without a name by an author without a name").

== History and dating ==
=== Traditional account ===
According to traditional and legendary accounts, after writing the Kural text, Tiruvalluvar left for Madurai on the advice of his friends to "triumph over the college of the doctors" at the Madurai College. On the way to Madurai, at Idaykarlyi, he met Avvaiyar and Idaikkadar and revealed the purpose of his journey and they joined him, too, in his journey to the College of Madurai. Upon reaching the Madurai College, Tiruvalluvar submitted his text, calling it Muppāl, before Somasundara, in the hearing of the Pandyan king and his ministers, chiefs, and scholars. This alarmed the assembly of professors. Legend has it that forty-nine professors "sat as kings of the sweet tongue" on the bench of poets, known as Sanga palagai, by the tank covered with the golden lotus at the Madurai temple. The scholars there were adept at finding errors in the most skillful compositions. This is well known by the account of Nakkirar II, one of the later scholar of the Madurai College lineage who even dared to say to Shiva, "Though you show us your frontal eye, a fault is a fault", on his appearing to favor an amateur poet named Dharumi. The assembly of scholars said to have doubted Tiruvalluvar's erudition and said to him that the bench on which they sat will make room for the best treatise in high Tamil, which shall be taken as a sign of acceptance of his work. When Tiruvalluvar laid his book thereupon, the seat immediately contracted itself to the size of the work throwing all the professors into the lotus pond. Scrambling out of the water, the forty-nine scholars pronounced a stanza each in praise of Tiruvalluvar and his work. Idaikkadar and Avvaiyar, who accompanied Tiruvalluvar in the journey, broke their silence and gave their opinion in the form of poetry. With four more verses adding to the corpus, including that by divine elements such as the voices of the Oracle, Namagal (Saraswati), and Iraiyanar (Shiva), the collection came to be known as the Tiruvalluva Malai or "the garland to Tiruvalluvar".

=== Historical account ===
As with the date of the Tirukkural and its author itself, the exact date of the composition of the verses of the Tiruvalluva Malai remains unclear. All the contributors of the Tiruvalluva Malai pre-date the period of the earliest commentators of the Kural text such as Manakkudavar. Historically, the time of the contributors spans several centuries starting from around 1st century CE. According to S. N. Kandasamy, the work must have been composed no later than 7th and 8th centuries CE. The verses must have been compiled into its present form by around 10th century CE. David Shulman attributes it to the Chola period.

== Content ==
Tiruvalluva Malai is a collection of verses said to have been composed by gods, goddesses, and poets of different times, all belonging to the legendary Tamil Sangam at Madurai. A total of 55 poets have composed their encomia in 55 verse in the collection, all written several centuries after the composition of the Kural text. With the exception of Avvaiyar and Idaikkadar, both of whom composed their verses in Kural venpa metre (couplet form), all the 53 poets have written their composition in the Venpa (quatrain) form.

The Tiruvalluva Malai refers to the Kural text mostly as Muppāl, a name preferred by Tiruvalluvar himself. The name appears in 15 different places, including verses 9, 10, 11, 12, 15, 17, 18, 19, 30, 31, 39, 44, 46, 49, and 53, indicating the title of the work.

Following is a sample verse in quatrain from the collection, written by poet Kapilar (c. 1st century CE):

Original: தினையளவு போதாச் சிறுபுல்நீர் நீண்ட பனையளவு காடும் படித்தால் — மனையளகு வள்ளைக்கு உறங்கும் வளநாட! வள்ளுவனார் வெள்ளைக் குறட்பா வரி. (Verse 5)	Meaning: As the tiny dew upon the blade of a grass reflects The whole of a tall palm tree nearby, So the pithy Kural couplets of Tiruvalluvar reflect The wholesome thoughts of humanity.

== Contributors ==
Contributors of the Tiruvalluva Malai include three divine poets and 52 Sangam poets.

1. Asariri (the Oracle)
2. Naamagal (Goddess Saraswathi)
3. Iraiyanar (Lord Shiva)
4. Ukkira Peruvaluthiyar
5. Kapilar
6. Paranar
7. Nakkirar I
8. Mamulanar
9. Kalladar
10. Seethalai Sathanaar
11. Marutthuvan Dhamodharanar
12. Nagan Devanar
13. Arisil Kilar
14. Ponmudiyar
15. Kodhamanar
16. Naththathanar
17. Mugaiyalur Sirukarunthumbiyar
18. Aasiriyar Nallanthuvanar
19. Keerandhaiyar
20. Sirumedhaviyar
21. Nalgur Velviyar
22. Thoditthalai Viluthandinar
23. Velliveedhiyar
24. Mangudi Marudhanar
25. Ericchalur Malaadanar
26. Pokkiyaar
27. Mosikeeranar
28. Kaari Kannanar
29. Madurai Tamil Naganar
30. Baratham Paadiya Perundevanar
31. Uruthirajenma Kannar
32. Perunchithiranar
33. Nariveruvu Thalaiyar
34. Madurai Tamilaasiriyar Sengunrur Kilar
35. Madurai Aruvai Vanigan Ilavettanar
36. Kavisagara Perundevanar
37. Madurai Perumarudhanar
38. Kovoor Kilar
39. Uraiyur Mudhukootthanar
40. Ilikat Perunkannanar
41. Seyir Kaviriyar Maganaar Saathanar
42. Seyalur Kodum Senkannanar
43. Vannakkan Saathanar
44. Kalathur Kilar
45. Nacchumanar
46. Akkaarakkani Nacchumanar
47. Nappalatthanar
48. Kulapathi Nayanar
49. Thenikkudi Keeranar
50. Kodi Gyalanmaani Boodhanar
51. Kowniyanar
52. Madurai Paalasiriyanar
53. Alangudi Vanganar
54. Idaikkadar
55. Avvaiyar

== Commentaries ==
There are several commentaries to the Tiruvalluva Malai, interpreting the meaning of the verses, written over the centuries. The first commentary on the work was written in the 19th century by Tirutthanigai Saravanaperumal Aiyar.

== See also ==
- Tirukkural
- Glossary of names for the Tirukkural
