= Kodhamanar =

Poet of the Sangam period

Kōthamanār (Tamil: கோதமனார்) was a poet of the Sangam period, to whom 2 verses of the Sangam literature have been attributed, including verse 15 of the Tiruvalluva Maalai.

== Contribution to the Sangam literature ==
Kodhamanar has written a sole Sangam verse, namely, verse 366 of the Purananuru, apart from verse 15 of the Tiruvalluva Maalai.

=== Views on Valluvar and the Kural ===
Kodhamanar opines about Valluvar and the Kural text thus:

The Brahmans preserve the four Vēdas orally, and never commit them to writing, because if read by all they would be less valued; but the Cural of Valluvar, though committed to writing and read by all, would nevertheless not lose its value. [Emphasis in original]

== See also ==
- Sangam literature
- List of Sangam poets
- Tiruvalluva Maalai
