= Iraiyanar =

Poet of the Sangam period

Iraiyanar (Tamil: இறையனார்), literally meaning "the Lord" and also a common name of Shiva, was a legendary poet of the Sangam period who is believed to have composed verse 2 of Kurunthogai. He is believed to be the incarnation of Lord Shiva of the temple at Madurai, known as 'Aalavaai Sokkar' or 'Sokkanathar'. Verse 3 of the Tiruvalluva Maalai, praising Valluvar, is also attributed to him.

== Legend ==
Iraiyanar is said to be the human incarnation of Lord Somasundarar at the temple at Madurai. Iraiyanar appears in the Thiruvilaiyadal Puranam, where he confronts poet Nakkirar II. He is also said to have given the work Iraiyanar Akapporul. Some claim that Iraiyanar was a mortal poet who lived during the Sangam era.

== Views on Valluvar and the Kural ==
Iraiyanar opines about Valluvar and the Kural text thus:

The Cural which has proceeded from the mouth of Valluvar, the king of poets, will never lose its beauty by the lapse of time: it will be always in its bloom, shedding honey like the flower of the tree in Indra's paradise. [Emphasis in original]

== See also ==
- Iraiyanar Akapporul
- List of Sangam poets
- Sangam literature
- Tiruvalluva Maalai
