= Ericchalur Malaadanar =

Poet of the Sangam period

Ericchalur Malaadanar (Tamil: எறிச்சலூர் மலாடனார்), known in full as Kōnāttu Erichalūr Mādalan Madhurai Kumaranār (Tamil: கோனாட்டு எறிச்சலூர் மாடலன் மதுரைக் குமரனார்), was a poet of the Sangam period, to whom 7 verses of the Sangam literature are attributed, including verse 25 of the Tiruvalluva Maalai.

== Biography ==
Ericchalur Malaadanar was one of the 49 poets of the Late Sangam period. He hailed from the town of Ericchalur in Konaadu. Known by the name of Kumaran, he was the son of Malaadan. He lived in Madurai. He has sung verses on the Chola, Valudhi, and Kodhai rulers.

== Contribution to the Sangam literature ==
Ericchalur Malaadanar has written 7 verses, including 6 in Purananuru (verses 54, 61, 167, 180, 197, and 394) and 1 in Tiruvalluva Maalai.

== See also ==
- Sangam literature
- List of Sangam poets
- Tiruvalluva Maalai
