= Akkarakkani Nacchumanar =

Poet of the Sangam period

Akkārakkani Nacchumanār (Tamil: அக்காரக்கனி நச்சுமனார்) was a poet of the Sangam period to whom verse 46 of the Tiruvalluva Maalai is ascribed.

== Biography ==
Akkārakkani Nacchumanār was a poet belonging to the late Sangam period (between 1st century BCE and 2nd century CE). The term Akkārakkani denotes the Hindu god Vishnu. Thus, he is believed to have been a follower of Vaishnavism.

== View on Valluvar and the Kural ==
Akkārakkani Nacchumanār wrote verse 46 of the Tiruvalluva Maalai. He opines about Valluvar and the Kural text thus:

The moon full of Kalei (the whole of her face being illuminated) pleases the external eyes, in like manner as the Cural full of Kalei (knowledge) pleases the intellectual eyes; but nevertheless she cannot be compared to Valluvar's production, for she is neither spotless, nor does she retain her form and splendour unchanged like it.

== See also ==
- Sangam literature
- List of Sangam poets
- Tiruvalluva Maalai
