= Nalgur Velviyar =

Sangam era Tamil poet

Nalgūr Vēlviyār (Tamil: நல்கூர் வேள்வியார்) was a poet of the Sangam period to whom verse 21 of the Tiruvalluva Maalai.

== Biography ==
Nalgur Velviyar was a poet belonging to the late Sangam period that corresponds between 1st century BCE and 2nd century CE. He hailed from the town named Nalgur.

== View on Valluvar and the Kural ==
Nalgur Velviyar has authored verse 21 of the Tiruvalluva Maalai. He opines about Valluvar and the Kural text thus:

They say that Siva is the patron of North Madura, but this poet who pours out instruction in honeyed words with a parental solicitude, is the patron of South Madura abounding with water.

== See also ==
- Sangam literature
- List of Sangam poets
- Tiruvalluva Maalai
