= Kalathur Kilar =

Kalathūr Kilār (Tamil: களத்தூர்க் கிழார்) was a poet of the Sangam period to whom verse 44 of the Tiruvalluva Maalai.

== Biography ==
Kalathūr Kilār was a poet belonging to the late Sangam period that corresponds between 1st century BCE and 2nd century CE. He hailed from the town named Kalathur. He is known for referring to the Mahabaratha as the "Fifth Veda" in his Tiruvalluva Maalai verse.

== View on Valluvar and the Kural ==
Kalathūr Kilār has authored verse 44 of the Tiruvalluva Maalai. He opines about Valluvar and the Kural text thus:

He who studies the two-lined verses in the three divisions of Valluvar's Cural, will obtain the four things (virtue, wealth, pleasure, and eternal happiness); for they contain the substance of the five Vēdas (including the Mahābhārat), and the six systems of the six sects. [Emphasis in original]

== See also ==
- Sangam literature
- List of Sangam poets
- Tiruvalluva Maalai
