= Madurai Tamilaasiriyar Sengunrur Kilar =

Sengunrūr Kilār, known in full as Madurai Tamilāsiriyar Sengunrūr Kilār (Tamil: மதுரைத் தமிழாசிரியர் செங்குன்றூர்க் கிழார்), was a poet of the Sangam period to whom verse 34 of the Tiruvalluva Maalai.

== Biography ==
Sengunrur Kilar was a poet belonging to the late Sangam period that corresponds between 1st century BCE and 2nd century CE. Verse 28 of the Kongu Mandala Sathagam indicates that Sengunrur Kilar was born in the town of Songodai (modern-day Tiruchengode).^{[a]} He was a professor of the ancient Madurai College (Madurai Tamil Sangam). He was also the chief of the clan on the Sengundram hill.

== View on Valluvar and the Kural ==
Sengunrur Kilar has authored verse 34 of the Tiruvalluva Maalai. He opines about Valluvar and the Kural text thus:

To call anyone a poet upon this earth besides the divine Valluvar, would be like calling both the evening illumined by the moon, and the evening shrouded in darkness, a fine evening.

== See also ==
- Sangam literature
- List of Sangam poets
- Tiruvalluva Maalai

== Notes ==
a. The original verse reads as follows:
நிலவுலகத்தில் பலகலை தேர்ந்த நிபுணருளே
புலவர் திருவள்ளுவரென நேயம் பொருந்த உரை
குலவும் மதுரைத் தமிழாசிரியர் செங்குன்றூர்கிழார்
வலிமை உறவரும் செங்கோடையும் கொங்கு மண்டலமே. 28
