= Thoditthalai Viluthandinar =

Poet of the Sangam period

Thoditthalai Viluthandinar was a poet of the Sangam period, to whom a sole verse of the Sangam literature has been attributed, in addition to verse 22 of the Tiruvalluva Maalai.

== Biography ==
Thoditthalai Viluthandinar came to be so called owing to the phrase "Thoditthalai Vilutthandu" used in the verse that he composed in Purananuru. This was the only verse that describes the boisterous acts of young men.

== Contribution to the Sangam literature ==
Thoditthalai Viluthandinar has written a sole Sangam verse, namely, verse 243 of the Purananuru, apart from verse 22 of the Tiruvalluva Maalai.

=== Views on Valluvar and the Kural ===
Thoditthalai Viluthandinar opines about Valluvar and the Kural text thus:

The great poet's work comprises everything; or, if there be anything which it does not comprise, he alone knows it.

== See also ==
- Sangam literature
- List of Sangam poets
- Tiruvalluva Maalai

== Bibliography ==
- Edward Jewitt Robinson (2001). Tamil Wisdom: Traditions Concerning Hindu Sages and Selections from Their Writings. New Delhi: Asian Educational Services.
