= Nariveruvu Thalaiyar =

Poet of the Sangam period

Nariverūuth Thalaiyār (Tamil: நரிவெரூஉத் தலையார்) was a poet of the Sangam period, to whom 5 verses of the Sangam literature have been attributed, including verse 33 of the Tiruvalluva Maalai.

== Biography ==
Nariveruvu Thalaiyar was known for his sickness, which was cured by the Chera king Cheraman Karuvuraeriya Olvat Kopperuncheral Irumporai. His head was said to be frightening enough to scare away a carcass-scavenging jackal, hence the given name.

== Contribution to the Sangam literature ==
Nariveruvu Thalaiyar has written 5 Sangam verses, including 2 in Kurunthogai (verses 5 and 236), 2 in Purananuru (verses 5 and 195), and 1 in Tiruvalluva Maalai (verse 33).

== See also ==
- Sangam literature
- List of Sangam poets
- Tiruvalluva Maalai
