= Uruthirajenma Kannar =

Uruthirajenma Kannar (Tamil: உருத்திர சன்மகண்ணர்) was a poet of the Sangam period to whom verse 31 of the Tiruvalluva Maalai.

== Biography ==
Uruthirajenma Kannar was a poet belonging to the late Sangam period that corresponds between 1st century BCE and 2nd century CE. He is known to be short-tempered, with his eyes seething in rage most of the times. Hence he was known by the name "Uruthirajenma Kannar", which literally means "he who has eyes raging with anger".

== View on Valluvar and the Kural ==
Uruthirajenma Kannar has authored verse 31 of the Tiruvalluva Maalai. He opines about Valluvar and the Kural text thus:

Water springs forth when the earth is dug, and milk when the child sucks the mother's breast, but knowledge when the poets study Valluvar's Cural. [Emphasis in original]

== See also ==
- Sangam literature
- List of Sangam poets
- Tiruvalluva Maalai
