= Chenkuttuvan =

2nd century Chera dynasty ruler in south India

- Kadal Pirakottiya; Kadalottiya
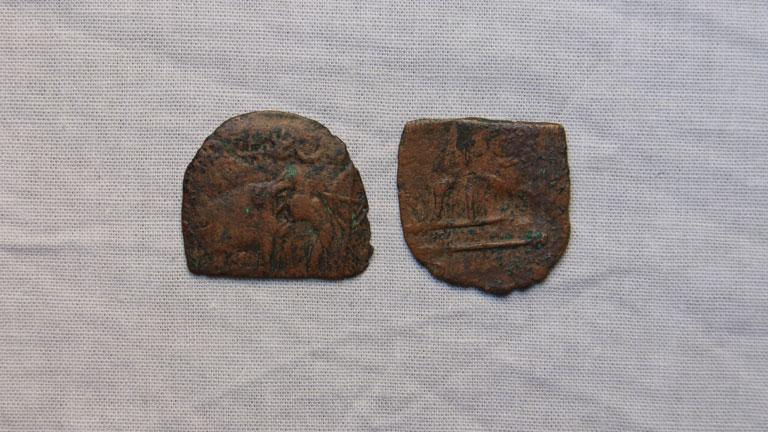
- Chera coin from early historic south India (Napier Museum, Thiruvananthapuram)

Chera ruler
- Reign: c. 180 CE
- Spouse: Illanko Venmal (Silappathikaram)
- House: Chera
- Father: Nedum Cheralathan
- Mother: Chola Manakkilli

Chenkuttuvan (c. 180 CE, literally 'the Righteous Kuttuvan'), title Kadal Pirakottiya, identified with Kadalottiya Vel Kezhu Kuttuvan, was the most celebrated Chera ruler of early historic southern India. He is also mentioned in Silappathikaram, the Tamil epic poem purportedly composed by the Chera prince Ilanko Adikal.

Chenkuttavan is eulogized by the poet Paranar in the fifth decade of the Pathitrupathu Collection, part of the Ettuthokai Anthology of early Tamil literature (the Sangam Literature). He was likely a member of the Muchiri-Karur branch (associated with present-day central Kerala) of the Chera dynasty. During his reign, the Chera territory encompassed the Malabar Coast (present-day Kerala) and the interior Kongu country (western Tamil Nadu). The influx of Yavana (Greco-Roman) gold into south India through the Indian Ocean spice trade during Chenkuttavan's reign is memorably described in ancient Tamil poems.

According to Fifth Decade, Pathitrupathu, Chenkuttavan achieved a major victory against a northern "Arya" king, occupied the forests of "Idumbil", and won another significant battle at a location called "Viyalur" (possibly against the powerful Ezhimala chieftain Nannan). He also destroyed Kodukur, likely located in the Kongu country, defeated a chieftain named Mannan of Mokur, and successfully intervened in a succession dispute in the Chola country, installing his chosen contender on the throne.

The martial achievements of Chenkuttavan are described — albeit in an exaggerated manner — in the medieval Tamil epic poem Silappathikaram. A method known as the "Gajabahu Synchronism/Triple Synchronism", based on Canto 30:160 from this epic, is widely used by scholars to date Chenkuttuvan's reign to around the 2nd century CE.

== Early Tamil texts ==
Chenkuttavan is praised by the poet Kacharu Cheyyul Paranar in the fifth decade of Pathitrupathu Collection, part of the Ettuthokai Anthology. In the Pathitrupathu, he is described as the Lord of the Kudavar people (that is, of Kudanadu) and as the Kuttuvan (the Lord of the Kuttuvar people).

Chenkuttavan was the son of the Chera ruler "Imayavaramban" Nedum Cheralathan, the Lord of the Westerners, and Chola Manakilli, a princess from family of the Cholas of Uraiyur. "Kalankayakkanni" Narmudi Cheral and "Adu Kottu Pattu" Cheralathan were his elder and younger half-brothers, respectively (Pathitrupathu Collection). The wife of Chenkuttuvan was certain Illanko Venmal, the daughter of a velir chieftain (Chilappathikaram). According to Pathitrupathu, Chenkuttuvan ruled the Chera country for 55 years. His son was known as "Kuttuvan Cheral", possibly the ruler of the "Umpar Kadu" region.

The Pathitrupathu Collection that praises Chenkuttuvan notably contains references to burial grounds with urns holding the remains of earlier Chera rulers.

The patikam to Pathitrupathu, Decad V, mentions Chenkuttuvan's expedition to bring the sacred stone for the creation of the Pattini idol, during which he defeated and killed an "Arya" king. Scholars believe that the exaggerated account of Chenkuttuvan's military expedition to the Ganges Valley, as found in Chilappathikaram, may have been a later interpolation into this text or an associated ancient (now lost) tradition.

The ten Pathitrupathu songs praising Chenkuttuvan are;

1. The Venkai-tree with Glowing Flowers
2. The Shining Seat of Vessels
3. The Shelves that Cannot be Climbed
4. The Sturdy Limbs Destroyed by Pain
5. The Food with Meat Curry
6. The Wheels with Bloody Ridge
7. Viralis with Delicate Forehead
8. A Great and High Life
9. The Warriors with Red Hands
10. The Frightening Flood-like Vanguard

== Relation to maritime trade ==
Poet Paranar praises the Chera ruler Chenkuttuvan for his maritime prowess.

"Kuttuvan not finding an enemy worthy to fight with became angry, with martial might besieged the sea and with magnificent spear drove back the sea whose wave rose high".

Early Tamil poems refer to the "hill products" and "sea products" — later mainly being precious pearls — associated with Chenkuttuvan, and to the Yavana (Graeco-Roman) gold that "reached ashore by boats" in exchange (Purananuru 343). Chenkuttuvan's mastery over the sea may have earned him the frequently used title "Kadal Pirakottiya", which roughly translates to "One Who Left the Sea Behind" or "One Who Drove Back the Sea".

In the Pathitrupathu, Chenkuttuvan is described as "the conqueror of the cool sea with sounding waves" and as the distributor of sapphire-coloured wine from the shining seat of vessels—a possible reference to Mediterranean wine.

== Military achievements ==
Poet Paranar also praised Chenkuttuvan's military prowess -

"Kuttuvan of the Gold Garland, whose army destroyed the beauty of many lands, till the noise rose loud of the drums used in numerous battles with the monarchs of the country between Comorin (Cape Comorin) on the south and Himalayas, the mountain that rises high as the northern boundary."

According to the Panegyric of the Fifth Decade of the Patirruppattu:

"He [was] the son who was born from Colan Maṇakiḷḷi, to [his father] Neṭuñcēralāṭaṉ, the king of the Westerners with sky-touching victorious flag that is feared by the northerners, ([the son who] desired to take a rock (kal kōḷ) for the divine (kaṭavuḷ) Pattiṉi, [who] slid like an arrow through the forest where the wind whispers, [who] killed the āriya majesty, [who] bathed in the famous Kaṅkai (Ganga) with many sweet waterfalls, ( [who] brought back many cows with [their] calves chosen [as good ones] from the herd, [who] camped outside of Iṭumpil of unwavering strong bows, [who] destroyed Viyalūr of neytal-flowers with small clusters, so that [its] strong men fell who were like tigers that are encountered, [who] attacked Koṭukūr after he approached that [other] seashore, ([who] accomplished to chop down the entire foot of the hard trunk of the vēmpu-tree [which had] dark branches [and] was guarded by Paḻaiyaṉ, [who] fastened the elephant cart by the ropes of the dark tresses of the many scented wives [of the enemies], whose jewels [had been] taken off [by him], ( [who] camped outside of Vāyil, so that nine heirs of the Cōḻa family fell [because of their] unending, harsh and wrathful quarrel (ceru), ([who] cut their strength in a long-lasting battle."

— Patirruppattu - 5 th decade Panegyic

The following are the military achievements of Chenkuttuvan from early Tamil poems.

1. The panegyric to the fifth decade describes Chenkuttuvan as "the king feared by the northerners", who wanted to take a sacred stone for the idol of the goddess Pattini. He is also reported to have killed a certain "Arya king" and bathed in the sacred Ganges River.
2. It is recorded that Chenkuttavan camped at a location called "Idumbil" with his warriors. He won a major victory at another location called "Viyalur" (perhaps in the country of Ezhimala Nannan and against Nannan). The "fort" of Kodukur, perhaps in the Kongu country, was also destroyed. In this War kodugur and Viyalur Nannan was helped by Cholas and Pandyas but cheran Senguttuvan defeated the combined army and conquered Nannan territories. Cheran Senguttuvan was powerful monarch of south india that time he could dominated Cholas and Pandyas Region . It's represented by his royal decrees bore consisted of bow , the fish and the tiger . It's make that Cheran senguttuvan great monarch.
3. He also defeated a Pandya chieftain called "Pazhaiyan" Mannan of Mokur (while aiding his ally Arukai, an enemy of the Mannan of Mokur) (Pathitrupathu, 45, V Pathikam and repeated in Chilappathikaram, XXVIII, 124-26).
4. It is recorded that Chenkuttuvan successfully intervened in a succession dispute in the Chola country and established his relative (brother-in-law) Killi on the throne. The other nine Chola contenders to the throne were defeated in a battle at a location known as "Vayil" or "Neri-vayil".

Additional achievements described in Chilappathikaram include;

1. In the Chilappathikaram, Chenkuttuvan is described as the ruler who "overthrew the Kadambu [tribe] with fences of the vast/dark water" or as the one "who overthrew the Kadambu of the Sea."
2. He also conquered the Kongar (or the people of the Kongu country) in a martial campaign (Chilappathikaram, XXV, 152-53).

According to the Pathitrupathu, Chenkuttuvan was renowned for his chariots, adorned with flags swaying at their tops, as well as for his horses and elephants. The text contains multiple references to swords, bows and arrows, and "walls protected by deep moats". It is also mentioned that Chenkuttuvan’s warriors used bull-hide shields to protect themselves from enemy darts (Pathitrupathu, 45).

== Chenkuttavan Chera in Chilappathikaram ==
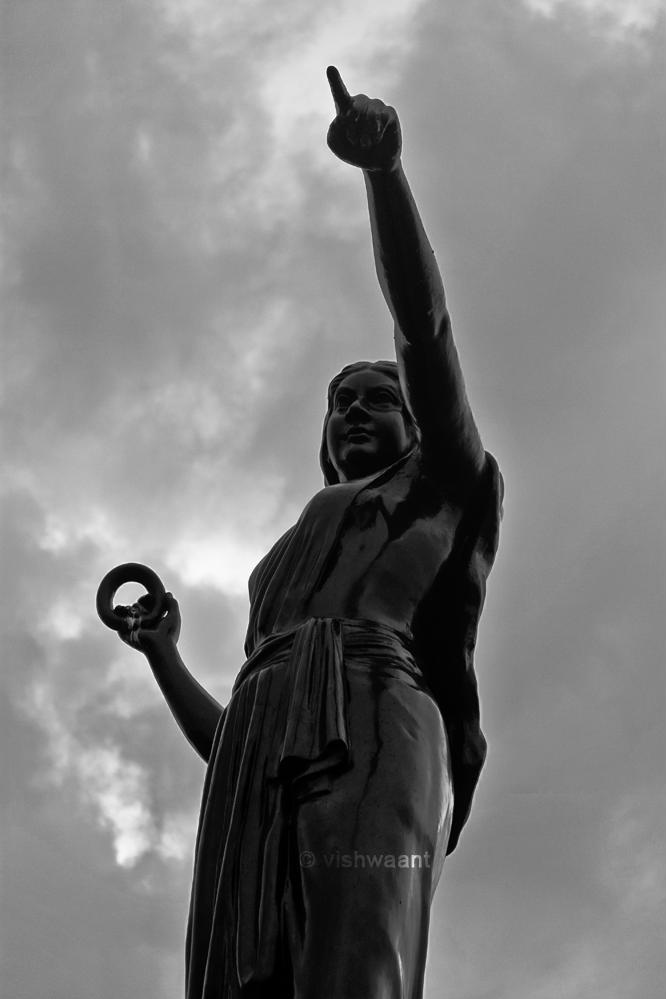
Kannaki statue in Chennai, Tamil Nadu

Authorship of the Tamil epic Chilappathikaram is traditionally ascribed to prince Ilanko Adikal (literally "the prince ascetic"; Kudakko Cheral Ilanko), who appears in the work as the younger brother of Chenkuttuvan Chera. The third part of Chilappathikaram (the Vanchi Kantham) narrates Chenkuttuvan's expedition to the Himalayas to collect the virakkallu (sacred stone) for an idol of the goddess Kannaki-Pattini.

According to the patikam of Chilappathikaram, the royal astrologer at the Chera king's court predicted that the younger prince, or the Ilanko, would succeed the king. In response, Ilanko immediately renounced his claim to the throne and chose to live as an ascetic. He relocated to a Jain monastery (the Kunavayir Kottam) on the outskirts of Vanchi, where he composed the epic Chilappathikaram.

=== Context ===
Chera king Chenkuttuvan and his queen, Ilanko Venmal, were moved by Kannaki's tragic story, and the queen wanted her to be worshipped as a "Goddess of Chastity". In response, Chenkuttuvan sought advice from his court, which suggested carving a stone block from the sacred Himalayas to create the "virakkallu" (the sacred stone) for the Kannaki idol.

The king then ordered a military expedition to the Himalayas. Setting out from his capital, Vanchi, Chenkuttuvan first led his army to the Blue Mountain (the Nilgiris), where he was welcomed by learned Brahmanas, the people of Konkana country, the Karunatar, and the people of Kongu country, as well as the Ovar. There, he also met Sanjaya, an envoy of king Nutruvar Kannar (the Satavahana). Sanjaya informed Chenkuttuvan that the Nutruvar Kannar had no conflicts with the Chera ruler. Chenkuttuvan responded that he needed vessels to cross the River Ganges.

The Chera army then marched to the Ganges, crossed it using the vessels provided by the Nutruvar Kannar, and camped in the "uttara country". Soon, the northern Arya rulers—led by Kanaka and Vijaya, sons of Balakumara, along with allied princes Uttara, Vichitra, Rudra, Bhairava, Chitra, Singha, Dhanurdhara, and Sveta—confronted Chenkuttuvan's forces with a massive army. After a fierce battle, the northern alliance was defeated, and the sacred stone for the Kannaki-Pattini idol was secured.

Princes Kanaka and Vijaya were taken as prisoners and brought to the southern country. Two and a half months after his departure, Chenkuttuvan returned victoriously to Vanchi, where the temple for Kannaki-Pattini was consecrated with the virakkallu from the Himalayas.

The Bhagavati Temple in Kodungallur, Kerala, is believed to be the Kannaki temple thus consecrated.

=== Northern expedition in the Chilappathikaram ===
According to Chilappathikaram, Cheran Chenkuttuvan's northern expedition to the Ganges is described as follows:

"Villavan Kodai (his minister), then addressed the king: "May your righteous rule last many years! You fought against your equals who surrendered their tiger-flag and fish-flag on the bloody battlefield of Konkan. This (incident) has reached the ears of elephants stationed in the eight directions. My eyes will never forget the sight of your advancing elephant in the midst of Tamil hosts which destroyed the joint forces of Konkanar, Kalingar, the cruel Karunatar, Bangalar, Gangar, Kattiyar famous for their innumerable spears, and the northern Aryas. "Nor can we forget the valour you displayed singlehanded, when having made your mother bathe in the full and rising floods of the mighty Ganges, you waged such a terrific war against a thousand Aryas, that the cruel God of Death stood aghast."

— Cilappatikaram (Vanjikkandam; Katcikkadai), 150 - 164

"Confronted with such a warrior, Uttaran (Sans. Uttara), Vicittiran (Vicitra), Uruttiran (Rudra), Bairvan (Bhairava), Cittiran (Citra), Singan (Simha), Tanuttaran (Dhanurdhara), Sivetan (Siveta), and other kings of the north, along with Kanaka and Vijaya marched at the head of a confederate army vast as the ocean, saying : 'Let us see the prowess of the southern Tamil kings.’ When they advanced thus Senguttuvan inwardly rejoiced, even as a hungry lion in search of prey would rejoice at the sight of a herd of elephants, and sprang upon the different forces of the enemy decorated with kanci garlands. The pandal of flags swallowed the sun's rays; the earth (the battlefield) re-echoed to the sounds of the cruel drums covered with well-tanned skins, white conches, roaring drums, long horns and sweet cymbals (pandil), reinforced by the all-pervading thunder of the royal war-drum with its hairy covering seeming to devour lives given in sacrifice."

— Cilappatikaram (Vanjikkandam; Kalkotkadai), 182 - 196

"The king of the troops irresistible in battle (Senguttuvan) agreed. When he reached the glorious unfadable city of Vanji, rich with tribute obtained from expeditions against enemies, it was proclaimed throughout that magnificent city by the beat of a drum carried on the nape of the strong elephant of state ‘Long live our gracious king ! May he protect the world from age to age. Because our guardian monarch marches forth to procure a stone from the great Himalayas inscribed with the bow-emblem, all ye who are kings of the northern countries, come forth to meet him with tributes. Save yourselves, by remembering (before it is too late) the heroic exploit of our monarch who overthrew the hadamhu of the sea, and his equally heroic deed of carving the bow-emblem on the Himalayan slopes. If you will not listen, abandon your wives and lead the lives of anchorites. Long live the army, precious as his own face to the king who wears victorious anklets."

— Silapathikaram (Katcikkadai : 178 - 194)

== Dating Chenkuttavan Chera ==
A method known as Gajabahu Synchronism/Triple Synchronism, first propounded by scholar V. Kanakasabhai Pillai, is widely used by the scholars to date Chenkuttavan Chera to 2nd century CE. The method is often criticized for its dependency on numerous conjectures. However, complementary epigraphical/archeological evidence broadly seems to support the Gajabahu dating. The method was famously supported by historian K. A. Nilakanta Sastri.

=== Gajabahu Synchronism ===
As stated in Chilappathikaram (text proper, canto 30:160), several neighboring kings were invited by king Chenkuttavan to the installation of Kannaki-Pattini at Vanchi. These included the "Arya" kings Kanaka and Vijaya, the Kongu king of Kudaku, the king of Malva, and "Kayavaku", the king of Lanka.

The 30th Canto, 160, in translation, reads -

"The monarch of the world [Chenkuttavan] circumambulated the shrine thrice and stood there proffering his respects. In front of him the Arya kings released from prison, kings removed from central jail, the Kongu ruler of Kudaku, the king of Malva and Kayavaku, the king of sea-girt Ceylon, prayed reverently to the deity thus...

Kayavaku, the king of Lanka, can tentatively be identified with Gajabahu I, king of Sri Lanka (r. c. 173 — 195 CE). In this context, Chenkuttavan (and the early Tamil poems) can be dated to either the first or the last quarter of the 2nd century CE.

The Gajabahu dating is generally considered the "sheet anchor" for dating events in early historic Tamil texts (and the early historic rulers of southern India).

== In popular culture ==
=== Films ===
- The Tamil-language film Raja Rani (1956) features Sivaji Ganesan playing the role of Chenkuttavan in a play within the film.
- Chenkuttavan is briefly portrayed by an uncredited actor at the beginning of the Tamil-language film Poompuhar (1964).
