= Vannakkan Saathanar =

Poet of the Sangam period

Vannakkan Sāthanār (Tamil: வண்ணக்கஞ் சாத்தனார்) was a poet of the Sangam period to whom verse 43 of the Tiruvalluva Maalai.

== Biography ==
Vannakkan Saathanar was a poet from the late Sangam period that corresponds between 1st century BCE and 2nd century CE. He was known for his erudition in Sanskrit. He also did a comparative study on Tamil and Sanskrit.

== View on Valluvar and the Kural ==
Vannakkan Saathanar has authored verse 43 of the Tiruvalluva Maalai. He opines about Valluvar and the Kural text thus:

It is difficult to say whether the Sanskrit or the Tamil is the best: they are perhaps on a par, since the Sanskrit possesses the Vēda, and the Tamil the Cural, composed by the divine Valluvar. [Emphasis in original]

== See also ==
- Sangam literature
- List of Sangam poets
- Tiruvalluva Maalai
