= Nappalatthanar =

Nappalatthanar (Tamil: நப்பாலத்தனார்) was a poet of the Sangam period, to whom a sole verse of the Sangam literature has been attributed, in addition to verse 47 of the Tiruvalluva Maalai.

== Contribution to the Sangam literature ==
Nappalatthanar has written a sole Sangam verse—verse 240 of the Natrinai—besides verse 47 of the Tiruvalluva Maalai.

=== Views on Valluvar and the Kural ===
Nappalatthanar opines about Valluvar and the Kural text thus:

Valluvar has lighted a lamp for dispelling the darkness from the hearts of those who live in the world; having virtue for its bowl, wealth for its wick, pleasure for its oil, the fire of expression for its flame, and the short stanza for its stand.

== See also ==
- Sangam literature
- List of Sangam poets
- Tiruvalluva Maalai

== Bibliography ==
- Edward Jewitt Robinson (2001). Tamil Wisdom: Traditions Concerning Hindu Sages and Selections from Their Writings. New Delhi: Asian Educational Services.
