= Bijoy Sankar Barman =

Assamese Writer

Bijoy Sankar Barman (born 1980) is an Indian poet, writer and translator who writes in Assamese language. He has been awarded with Yuva Puraskar by Sahitya Akademi

Barman was recognized by Indian Express as one of the ten ‘Best Young Writers’ of India in 2012.

Apart from English and all other constitutionalized regional languages in India, his poems have been translated into Italian, French, Spanish, Estonian etc. The Mexican-Spanish version of his poem has been broadcast by Radio UdeG. He participated in literary events abroad.

His poem has been included in Great Indian poems, a representative anthology of 3000 years of Indian poetry edited by poet-diplomat Abhay K.

== Works ==
- His poetry book in Estonian translated by Mathura was published in 2016 as 'Pisarateoja Ketetong' meaning 'Streaming Tears of Ketetong'.
- He was the first one to translate the Tamil classic Kuruntokai to Assamese language. It was published as 'Kurundoheir Kabita' in 2014 in Assamese.
- 'Ashokashtami' (published in 2011 won Sahitya Akademi Yuva Puraskar in 2013 for this poetry collection)
- His poetry book in Bengali translated by Sanjay Chakraborty was published as 'Amar Angulgulir Ongkurodgam' in 2019 by Monfakira.
- 'Tug at the Gillnet', a poetry book of fifty three poems by Bijoy Sankar Barman translated into English by Nirendra Nath Thakuria was published by Halfcrow Publication House in 2021.
- Apart from 'Deo' (The Spririt Inside), the maiden poetry collection published in 2006 (won Munin Barkataki Award in 2007), his other poetry collections include 'Ashokastami' (2010), 'Barnamukti' (Release From Colour, 2015), 'Moi Maatir Naabhit Kaan Thoi Xuniso' (I Am Listening with My Ear to the Navel of the Earth, 2020), 'Kadam Phulbor Doivokeer Navam Santaan' (The Kadamba Flowers are Devaki's Ninth Child, 2025), Aamaar Premot Dekhon Kobita Nai, Aai Gosanee (Look, There is No Poetry in Our Love, O Sweetheart, 2021, Collection of Love Poems), Bishuvor Seeyoni (Stitch of the Equinox, 2022, Poems: 2000–2020)
- Other books include 'Lilacor Daatir Samadhi' (The Samadhi beside the Lilac, 2024, Translated from the original Estonian), 'Margherita Mor Bishad Boibhav' (Margherita, My Grandeur of Melancholy, 2010, Verse Novella), 'Aami Kiman Dusta Aasilo' (How Naughty We Were, 2010, Children Story Book, Co-authored with Payal Hazarika), 'Kabyacharcha' (Poetry Anthology of Contemporary New Poets, 2012, Ed.), 'Mayar Abelito' (The Magical Afternoon: An Intimate Conversation of Nine Teenagers with Zubeen Garg, 2026, Ed.), 'Nijaan Nisorgor Kobi' (The Poet of the Silent Nature, 2005, Biographical Book on William Wordswoth with Translated Poems), 'Rupiabathanor Kobi Prantikor Kobita' (The Poet from Rupiabathan, the Poetry of Prantik, 2008, Assamese-English Bilingual Poetry Collection

== Awards ==
- Munin Barkataki Award (2007)
- Sahitya Akademi's Yuva Puraskar (2013)
- Sabda Yuva Sahitya Award (2018)
- Pagladiya Award 2020-21
