= Thenikkudi Keeranar =

Thenikkudi Keeranār (Tamil: தேனிக்குடிக் கீரனார்) was a poet of the Sangam period to whom verse 49 of the Tiruvalluva Maalai.

== Biography ==
Thenikkudi Keeranar was a poet belonging to the late Sangam period that corresponds between 1st century BCE and 2nd century CE. He hailed from the town named Thenikkudi. He is also known for a verse on the bee in the Sangam literature.

== View on Valluvar and the Kural ==
Thenikkudi Keeranar has authored verse 49 of the Tiruvalluva Maalai. He opines about Valluvar and the Kural text thus:

By the Cural, the production of the divine Tiruvalluvar, the world has been enabled to distinguish truth from falsehood, which were hitherto confounded together. [Emphasis in original]

== See also ==
- Sangam literature
- List of Sangam poets
- Tiruvalluva Maalai
