= Kowniyanar =

Poet of the Sangam period

Kowniyanār (Tamil: கவுணியனார்) was a poet of the Sangam period to whom verse 51 of the Tiruvalluva Maalai.

== Biography ==
Kowniyanār was a poet belonging to the late Sangam period that corresponds between 1st century BCE and 2nd century CE. Not much is known about him.

== View on Valluvar and the Kural ==
Kowniyanār has authored verse 51 of the Tiruvalluva Maalai. He opines about Valluvar and the Kural text thus:

The short distichs which the learned poet Valluvar has composed in order that we may know the ancient right way, are sweet to the mind to meditate on; sweet to the ear to hear; and sweet to the mouth to repeat; and they moreover form a sovereign medicine to promote good and prevent evil actions.

== See also ==
- Sangam literature
- List of Sangam poets
- Tiruvalluva Maalai
