= Kulapathi Nayanar =

Poet of the Sangam period

Kulapathi Nāyanār (Tamil: குலபதி நயனார்), also known as Kulapathiyār, was a poet of the Sangam period to whom verse 48 of the Tiruvalluva Maalai is attributed.

== Biography ==
Kulapathi Nāyanār was a poet belonging to the late Sangam period that corresponds between 1st century BCE and 2nd century CE. He is believed to be the head of his clan.

== View on Valluvar and the Kural ==
Kulapathi Nāyanār has authored verse 48 of the Tiruvalluva Maalai. He opines about Valluvar and the Kural text thus:

As the Cural of Valluvar causes the lotus-flower of the heart to expand, and dispels from it the darkness which cannot otherwise be dispelled, it may well be compared to the hot-rayed sun, which causes the lotus-flower of the tank to expand, and dispels the darkness from the face of the earth. [Emphasis in original]

== See also ==
- Sangam literature
- List of Sangam poets
- Tiruvalluva Maalai
