= Madurai Tamil Naganar =

Madurai Tamil Nāganār (Tamil: மதுரைத் தமிழ்நாகனார்) was a poet of the Sangam period to whom verse 29 of the Tiruvalluva Maalai.

== Biography ==
Madurai Tamil Nāganār was a poet belonging to the late Sangam period that corresponds between 1st century BCE and 2nd century CE. He hailed from Madurai.

== View on Valluvar and the Kural ==
Madurai Tamil Nāganār has authored verse 29 of the Tiruvalluva Maalai. He opines about Valluvar and the Kural text thus:

What is the use of works of great length, when the short work of Valluvar alone is enough to edify the world? It contains all things, and there is nothing which it does not contain.

== See also ==
- Sangam literature
- List of Sangam poets
- Tiruvalluva Maalai
