= Mugaiyalur Sirukarunthumbiyar =

Mugaiyalur Sirukarunthumbiyar, also known in full as Sonaattu Mugaiyalur Sirukarunthumbiyar (Tamil: சோணாட்டு முகையலூர்ச் சிறுகருந்தும்பியார்), was a poet of the Sangam period, to whom two verses of Sangam literature have been attributed, in addition to verse 17 of the Tiruvalluva Maalai.

== Biography ==
Sirukarunthumbiyar lived in the town of Mugaiyalur. He has composed poetry on Vallarkilaan.

== Contribution to Sangam literature ==
Mugaiyalur Sirukarunthumbiyar has composed two verses in the Purananuru (verses 181 and 265) and verse 17 of the Tiruvalluva Maalai.

== See also ==
- Sangam literature
- List of Sangam poets
- Tiruvalluva Maalai
