= Perunchithiranar (Sangam poet) =

Poet in the Tamil language

Perunchithiranār (Tamil: பெருஞ்சித்திரனார்) was a poet of the Sangam period, to whom 11 verses of the Sangam literature have been attributed, including verse 32 of the Tiruvalluva Maalai.

== Biography ==
Perunchithiranar brought to light the charity and generous heart of ruler Kumanan. He is known for his courage in the face of his abject poverty. In fact, he exquisitely expressed in poetry the sufferings of his own mother, wife and children because of destitution. Despite his penurious state, he refused the munificence bestowed on him by king Ilaveliman. Perunchithiranar is also praised for his feminist notions, who treated his wife with equity.

== Contribution to the Sangam literature ==
Perunchithiranar has written 11 Sangam verses, including 10 in Purananuru (verses 158–163, 207, 208, 237, 238) and 1 in Tiruvalluva Maalai (verse 32).

== See also ==
- Sangam literature
- List of Sangam poets
- Tiruvalluva Maalai
