= Perum Cheral Irumporai =

- Thagadur Erinta
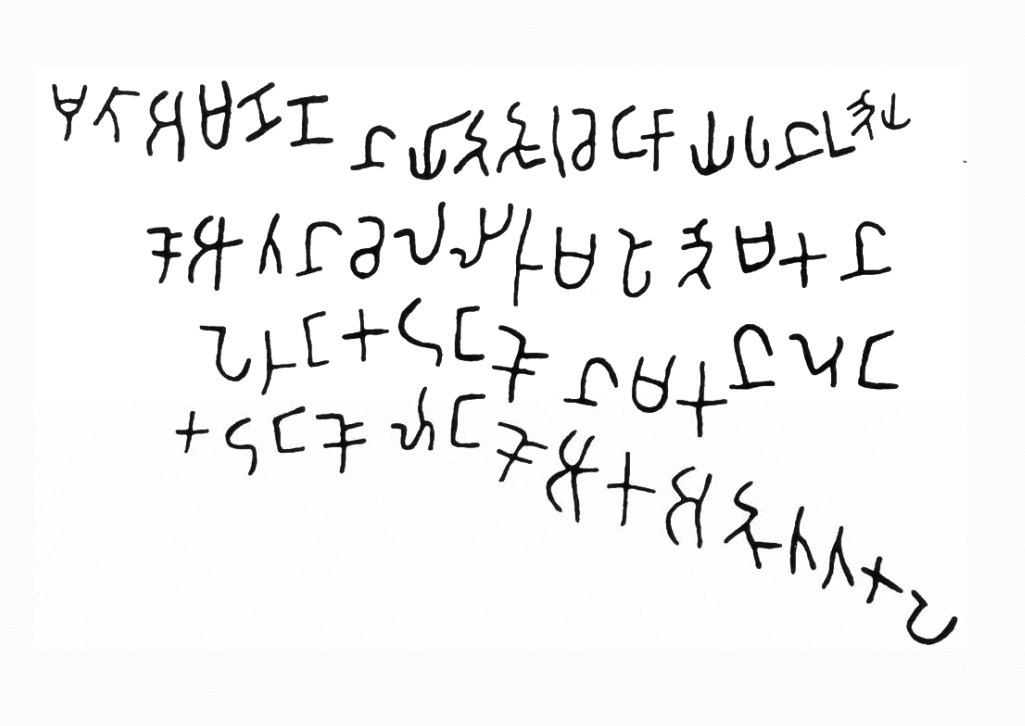
- Pugalur Jain inscription
- Issue: Ilam Cheral Irumpora
- House: Chera
- Father: Chelva Kadumgo Vazhi Athan
- Religion: Jainism

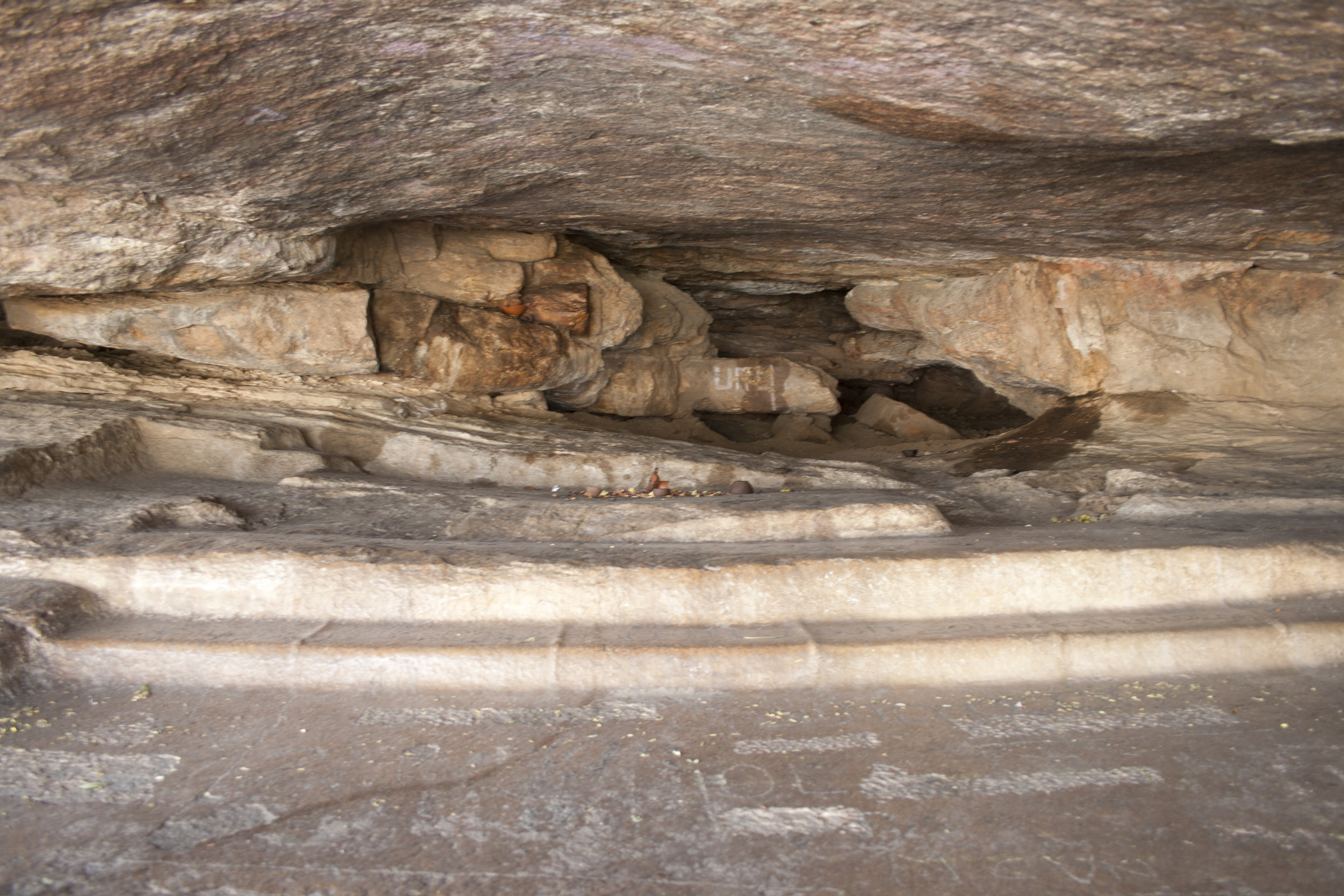
Chera Rock Shelter, Pugalur

Perum Cheral Irumporai, also known as Perum Kadungon, was a member of the Irumporai line of the Chera dynasty in early historic south India (c. 1st - 4th century CE). He is the hero of the Eighth Decade of the Pathitruppathu, composed by poet Arichil Kizhar. He is believed to have ruled for seventeen years and is also honored in the songs under the title "Kothai Marpa".

The 78th poem of the Eighth Decade of the Patirruppattu praises his achievements:

"If you go, o viṟalis with few bangles,

[then that is the hill] in the mountain with beautiful white waterfalls which shine and fall [noisily] like the victorious muracu-drum, the hill of the one with elephants spread like cows, with horses spread like goats (in their country at the time when the severe frontier was destroyed, after [he] marched [there], so that the fierce enmity, from which the watching musicians take to running, had been cut, while they became perplexed, [the hill which is] certainly [a source of] fear, after he destroyed Takaṭūr [which was] like a thicket dense with bows, Takaṭūr, which was guarded by warriors of victorious war by performing feats, [Takaṭūr] at the areas which possess difficult paths, where the many yields were permanent, while girls with tender nature were chatting everywhere in the woodlands as being ones with the desire to scare away the parakeets by advancing as someones who are tired [of work],

after [they] cut lotuses with pointed petals together with neytal-flowers.'

— Patirruppattu 8 th decade - 78th song

Perum Cheral was likely a member of the Irumporai or Porai line, a collateral branch of the Chera family (dominating the Kongu country with Karuvur or Karur as their regional headquarters). His father, Chelva Kadungo Vazhi Athan, was notably praised for possessing the cities of Kodumanam (present-day Kodumanal) and Pandar (possibly Koyilandy, on the Malabar Coast).

Perum Cheral was renowned for his conquest of the fortified city of Thagadur, the stronghold of the Adiyaman ruler Ezhini (who was aided by the Chola and Pandya rulers). Adiyaman, also known as Neduman Anji, later made peace with the Chera and became his ally. He was eventually killed during a Chera raid on Pazhi, which belonged to Ezhimala Nannan. Perum Cheral also appeared to have defeated a minor Idayar chief called Kazhuval or Kazhuvul and emptied his city Kamur or Kazhur. He was praised as the overlord of Puhar, the Chola capital, the Kolli hills and the Puzhi people. He was also said to have offered a sacrifice to the goddess of victory on the Ayirai mountain.

Perum Cheral is sometimes identified with Perum Kadungon, the Irumporai Chera royal mentioned in the two nearly identical Pugalur inscriptions. The inscriptions record the construction of a rock shelter for Chenkayapan, a Jain monk, on the occasion of the inauguration of Kadungon Ilam Kadungo — son of Perum Kadungon, who was in turn the son of king Athan Chel Irumporai — as the heir apparent ("Ilamgo"). These three Chera royals can be identified as Chelva Kadungo Vazhi Athan, Perum Cheral Irumporai, and Ilam Cheral Irumporai, who are mentioned in early Tamil literature (Decades 7-9, Pathitruppathu Collection).
