= Patiṟṟuppattu =

Classical Tamil poetic anthology

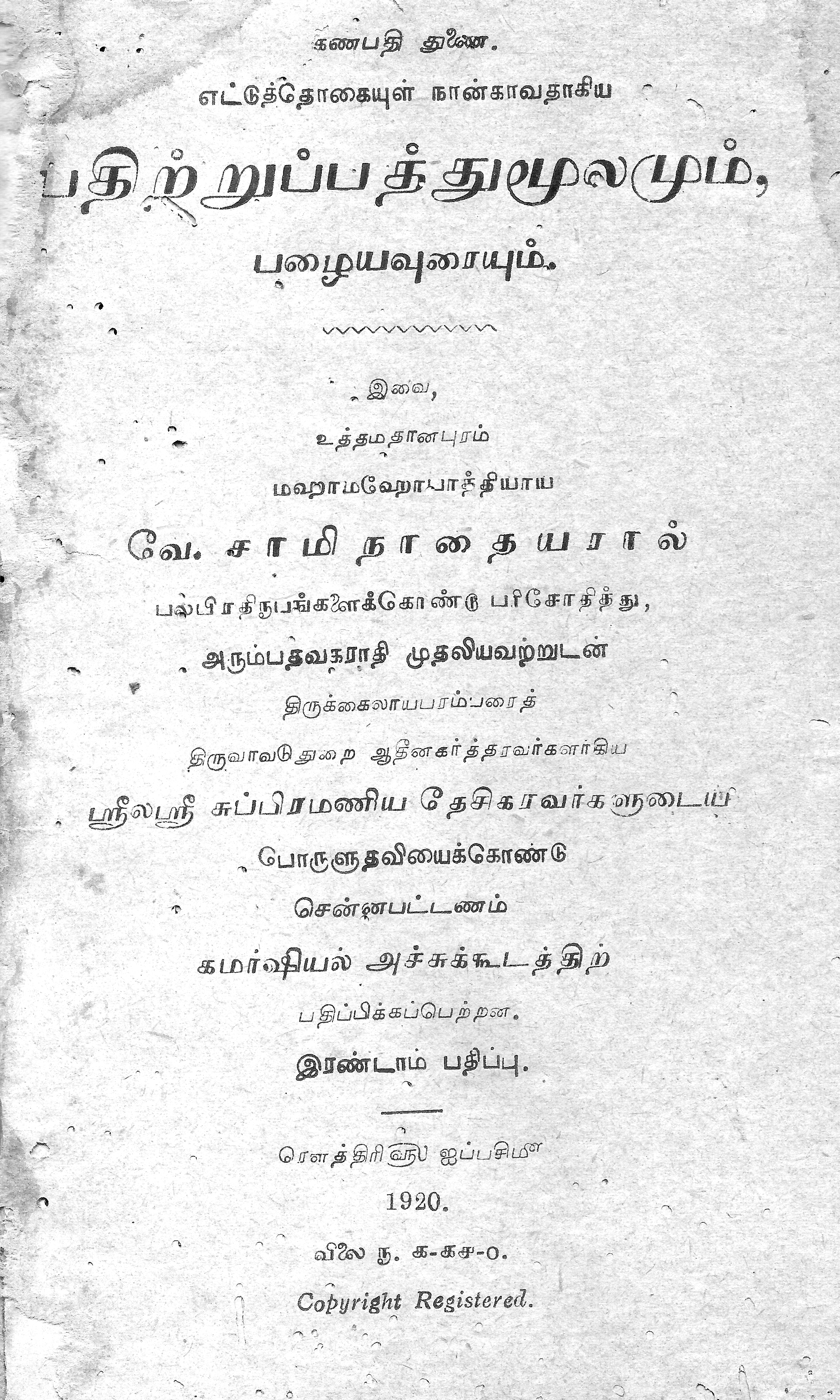
- An extract from the Patirruppattu
- Author: Multiple poets of the post-Sangam era
- Working title: Pathitrupathu
- Language: Old Tamil
- Series: The Eight Anthologies, part of the Eighteen Greater Texts
- Subject: Puram (public life)
- Genre: Poetry
- Set in: Post-Sangam era (2nd to 5th centuries CE)
- Publication place: India

The Patiṟṟuppattu (lit. Ten Tens, sometimes spelled Pathitrupathu,) is a classical Chera poetic work and one of the Eight Anthologies (Ettuthokai) in Sangam literature. A panegyric collection, it contains puram (war and public life) poems. The Chera kings, known as the Cheramal, are the centre of the work. Its invocatory poem is about Mayon, or Perumal (Vishnu).

The Patiṟṟuppattu originally contained ten sections of ten poems, each section dedicated to a decade of rule in ancient Kerala (Cerals, Chera); the first and last sections have been lost. Of the surviving poems, the second-to-sixth-decade-related poems are about the three generations of rulers from the Imayavaramban dynasty. The remaining poems are about the three generations of rulers from the Irumporai dynasty. In the Patirruppattu's palm-leaf manuscripts, each decade ends with a patikam (a verse epilogue followed by a prose colophon. According to U. V. Swaminatha Iyer (who rediscovered the Sangam manuscripts), a commentary was written in or after the 13th century.

The Patiṟṟuppattu was written by several male poets and one female poet, indicating that women could play a scholarly role in ancient South India. The poems praise rulers and heroes in Hagiographical form, with a core seemingly rooted in history. They mention the Hindu deities Vishnu, Shiva, Murugan and Korravai (Uma, Durga), and their worship by warriors and the king. The poems, epilogues, and colophons are significant in studies of ancient culture and sociology. The poetry probably relies on older oral traditions shared by post-Sangam Tamil epics.

Czech scholar Kamil Zvelebil wrote that the Patirruppattu was probably composed over a period of time: the first layer sometime between the 2nd and 4th centuries CE, and the second layer between the 3rd and 5th centuries. Its poems and patikams are of significant historical importance. According to T. P. Meenakshisundaram, the Patiṟṟuppattu is the "only available book of ancient Chera history".

== Structure ==
The ten verses in each of the eight tens now available have a common structure. Each verse has a title or caption, a catchy phrase found in the text of the verse. The text of the verse follows the caption or title. At the end of each verse is information about the poetic theme referred to with the Tamil term துறை (turai), rhythm with the Tamil word வண்ணம் (Vannam), metre (தூக்கு, Thookku) and the name of the verse, known as பெயர் (peyar). This type of information is rarely found in other classical Tamil literature. An epilogue (patikams)is at the end of each ten. The theme, rhythm, metre, name and epilogues were added by the authors of the patikams at a later date, before the commentaries were written; the patikams, as well as the verses, have been annotated.

== Contents ==
The Patirruppattu is about ten decades of Chera kings. Its second, third, fourth and fifth ten describe the Imayavaraman dynasty, and the sixth, seventh and eighth ten deal with the Irumporai dynasty. These are called the Ceral (plural Ceralar).

Each decade has 10 poems; each poem has an average length of 21 lines, and the entire decade averages 211 lines. The shortest verse (verse 87) is five lines long, and the longest (verse 90) is 57 lines in length. The supplemental patikams at the end of each decade vary in length from 10 to 21 lines. The poems include graphic details of war and violence.

=== Patikams ===
Each verse of the Patirruppattu's extant eight tens ends with a patikam, supplementary information about the decade. These patikams were added to the tens at a later date, before the medieval commentator Atiyarkkunallar, who wrote a commentary on Silappatikaram quoting the patikams.

=== First ten ===
These poems have been lost.

=== Second ten ===
These ten poems were written by Kumattur Kannan about the Cheral king Nedum Cheralathan.

=== Third ten ===
Palyanai Sel Kelu Kuttuvan, Nedum Cheralathan's brother, is the hero of the Patiṟṟuppattu's third ten. Palyanai helped his brother conquer the northern Malabar Coast, at least part of which came under Chera rule. In later life, Palyanai retired from the military life and devoted himself to the arts, letters, philanthropy and helping Brahmins.

=== Fourth ten ===
Poet Kappiyatru Kaapiyanaar composed these poems about Chera prince Narmudi Cheral, receiving four million gold coins. Narmudi had a series of victories, but was generous to those he defeated. In the battle of Vakaiperumturai, He defeated and killed Nannan of Ezhimalai, and annexed Puzhinadu.

=== Fifth ten ===
Paranar composed these ten poems about the Chera king Cenkuttuvan. According to Kamil Zvelebil, the Paranar poems are probably the Patiṟṟuppattu's best examples of the heroic genre.

This section is notable for dating the earliest Tamil epic, Silappatikaram. Although it includes details about Ceṅkuṭṭuvan's family and rule, it does not mention that he had a brother who became an ascetic and wrote a cherished epics. This has been a reason to consider legendary author Ilango Adikal a mythological figure later extrapolated into the epic, ruling out the epic as part of Sangam literature.

=== Sixth ten ===
Adu Kottu Pattu Cheralathan, a crown prince for 38 years who never became king, is the hero of the sixth ten. A patron of commerce, letters and the arts, he is described as giving a village in Kuttanad to Brahmins.

=== Seventh ten ===
The poet Kapilar composed these poems about Cheran Celvakkadungo Vazhi Aathan.

=== Eighth ten ===
The Cheral king Perunceral Irumporai is the subject of these ten poems.

=== Ninth ten ===
These poems were written about the Cheral king Perunceral Irumporai, possibly the brother of the king in the previous ten.

=== Tenth ten ===
These poems have been lost.

== See also ==
- Eight Anthologies
- Eighteen Greater Texts
- Sangam literature
