= Kapilar =

Tamil poet of the Sangam period

Kapilar or Kabilar (Tamil: கபிலர்) was the most prolific Tamil poet of the Sangam period (c. 3rd century BCE to 3rd century CE). He contributed 206 poems, or a little less than 10% of the entire Sangam-era classical corpus by 473 ancient poets. Held in high regard by other poets of the Sangam era, as well as the post-Sangam era, he is variously dated to have lived between c. 50–125 CE, or 140–200 CE.

He was a contemporary of Karikala Chola, Irunkōvēl and Vēl Pāri, and the close friend, confidant and alleged favorite of Vēl Pāri, one of the Vēlir kings. He authored the Inna Narpathu, a didactic work of the Sangam literature. Verse 5 of the Tiruvalluva Maalai is also attributed to him.

== Early life ==
Kapilar was born in Thiruvadhavur in the Pandyan Kingdom. Initially a poet at the Pandyan court, he left Madurai at an early age to travel across various kingdoms. Kapilar heard about the generosity and virtue of Vēl Pāri, a powerful Vēlir King who ruled over Parambunādu and paid him a visit. He became a friend and confidant of Pāri and stayed with him until the latter's death, serving as the chief poet and minister at the Pāri's court. Kowmareeshwari suggests he was born about mid-1st century CE, while Martha Ann Shelby states he most likely was born about 140 CE.

Kapilar sang about a number of kings such as Agudhai, Irungovel, Selva Kadungo Vazhiyadhan, Cheramaan Maandharancheral Irumborai, Ori, Nalli, Malayamaan Thirumudikkaari, Malayan, Vichikkon, Vaiyavi Koperum Pegan, Vel Pari. Kapilar has sung on King Selva Kadungovaliyadhan, which appears as the seventh group of verses in the Pathitrupathu. The king honoured Kapilar with 100,000 gold coins and a country under his control. Kapilar remained close with other contemporary poets such as Avvaiyar and Paranar.

== Siege of Parambu ==
The three crowned Tamil kings Cheras, Cholas and Pandyas expanded their kingdoms ruthlessly and turned their attention towards independent Vēlir Kings thus turning them into subordinates or eliminating them to annex their kingdoms. They laid siege to the heavily fortified country of Parambu, but Vēl Pāri refused to give in and the war dragged for years. Kabilar approached the kings and asked them to turn back describing his patron Pari as an unconquerable warrior (excerpt from Purananuru: song 109):

You may think Pāri's mountain is easy to conquer. Even though the three of you with your gigantic royal drums lay siege to it..Like the sky is his mountain. Like the stars in the sky are its springs. Even though your elephants are tied to every tree, your chariots spread through every field, you will not take it by fighting. He will not surrender it by the sword. But here: I know how you can win it. If you play little lutes, their strings of rubbed twine, have your dancing women come behind with thick, fragrant hair, and go to him dancing and singing, he will give you his mountain and his whole land.

After a long war, Vēl Pāri was killed by treachery. Purananuru, song (112) of Pāri's daughters on his death:

That day in that white moonlight, we had our father, and no one could take the hill. This day in this white moonlight, kings with drums beating victory, have taken over our hill, and we have no father.

== Aftermath and death ==
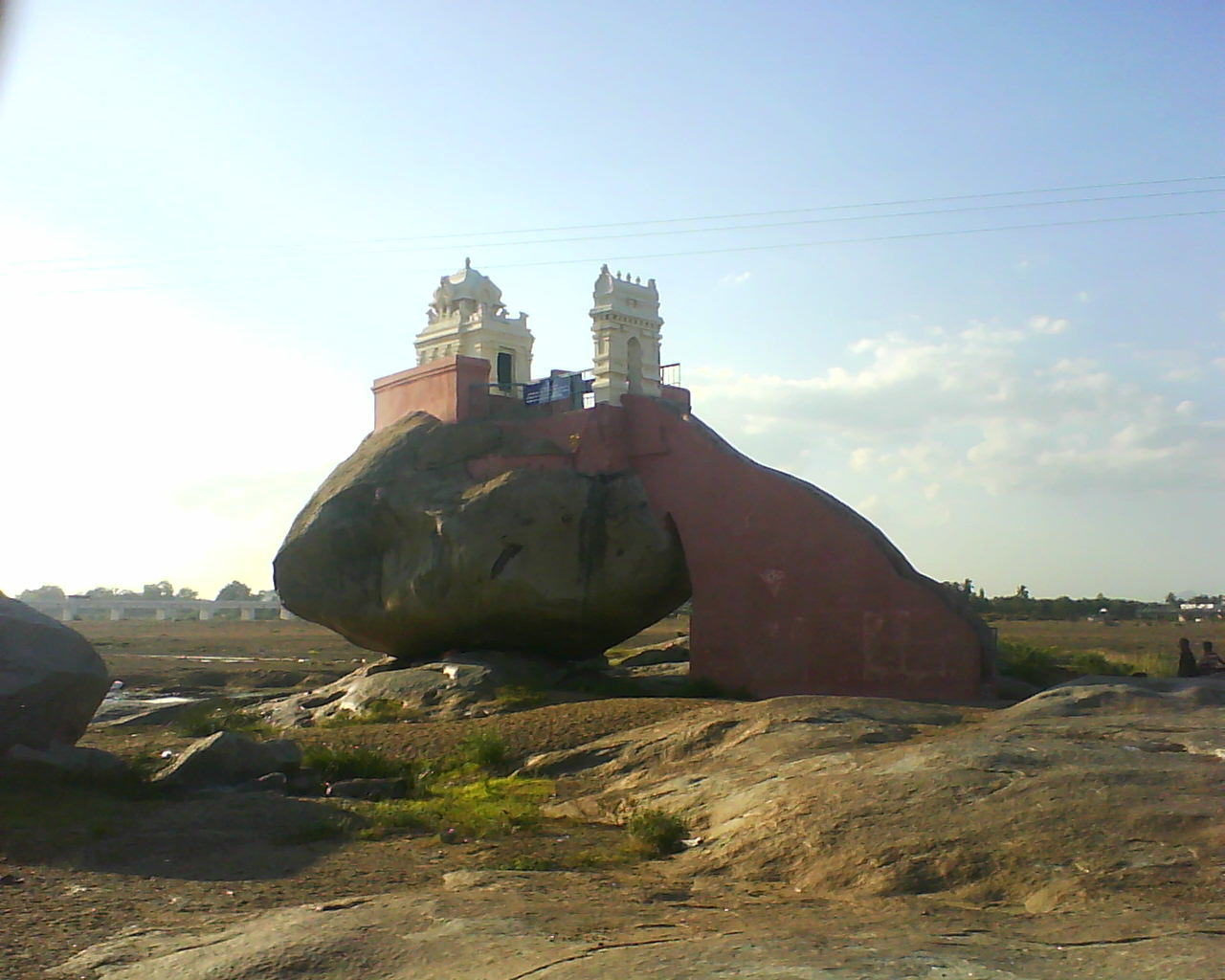
Kabilar rock on the Ponnaiyar River near Tirukoilur, Viluppuram district, Tamil Nadu, India

Kapilar become the guardian of Pāri's two daughters, Angavai and Sangavai, after Pari's death and the three of them left Parambu country. Kapilar unsuccessfully approached different Vēlir kings to find grooms. He would be let down each time as the other Vēlir kings would fear retribution from the three crowned kingdoms. The most notable of these encounters is when he sings to Irunkōvēl and the latter would insult Kabilar. He would finally leave the two princesses in the care of "Andhanars". Later, poet Avvaiyar takes care of them and marries them off successfully into the family of another Vēlir king Malaiyamaan Kaari.

The death of his friend Pāri affected Kapilar and he later took his own life by vadakirrutal, one of the Tamil ways of committing suicide. He sat facing north and starved himself to death in Kabilar Kundru.

== Works and contribution ==
Kabilar made huge contributions to Tamil literature of Sangam era. Kurincippattu is a poetic work in the Ten Idylls series of the Eighteen Greater Texts anthology in Tamil literature containing 261 lines of poems in the Achiriyappa meter written by Kabilar. An ancient note states that Kapilar wrote this to explain the beauty of Tamil poetry to a north Indian king names Brhadatta. Kurincippattu describes the kurinchi landscape of the mountainous terrain and mentions almost 100 different plant names. Kabilar also contributed to Puṟanāṉūṟu in the Eight Anthologies series of sangam literature. Kapilar used unique metaphors that show the interior landscape using the objects seen in the 'Kurinchi' landscape. 'Veral veli' written by Kapilar is considered as one of the master pieces.

=== Views on Valluvar and the Kural ===
Kapilar is believed to have accompanied Valluvar in his journey to the Madurai College of scholars to present the latter’s work, the Tirukkural. Verse 5 of the Tiruvalluva Maalai is attributed to Kapilar. He opines about Valluvar and the Kural text thus:

Valluvar’s Cural is short in words, but extensive in sense, even as in a drop of water on the blade of the millet might be seen reflected the image of the tall palmyra-tree. [Emphasis in original]

== See also ==
- Tiruvalluva Maalai
- List of Sangam poets
- Sangam literature
