= Nakkirar I =

Nakkirar I (c. 250 BCE) was a poet of the Sangam period, who composed anthologies including the Neṭunalvāṭai. He also wrote verse 7 of the Tiruvalluva Maalai.

== See also ==
- Sangam literature
- List of Sangam poets
- Tiruvalluva Maalai
