= Eighteen Greater Texts =

Collection of Tamil poetry anthologies

The Eighteen Greater Texts, known as Patiṉeṇmēlkaṇakku (Tamil: பதினெண்மேல்கணக்கு) in the literature, is the collection of the oldest surviving Tamil poetry. This collection is considered part of the Sangam literature and dated approximately between 100 BCE and 200 CE. A series of eighteen major anthologies, it contains the Eight Anthologies (Ettuthokai) and the Ten Idylls (Pattupattu). The songs in the Eighteen Greater Texts anthology are set in the Akaval style.

The Eighteen Greater Texts anthology contains 2,381 poems including the ten larger works belonging to the Ten Idylls collection. These poems are attributed to 473 poets. Sixteen of the 473 poets are responsible for 1,177 of the 2,279 poems for which the name of the author is known. In all, 102 of the poems are anonymous. Notably, the pathirruppathu collection exclusively collects poetry from the Cheral kings (from Kerala), whereas the other collections contain a mix of poetry patronized by diverse Tamil kings.

== Anthology ==
There is no information available on when these poems were collected or on the identity of the anthologist. These poems have passed through four stages of evolution. The poems were created by the bardic authors between 100 BCE and 200 CE. The poems were collected into the various anthologies. Colophons preserved with some of the works provide information about their transmission and compilation.

== See also ==
- Eighteen Lesser Texts
- Tamil literature
- List of historic Indian texts
