= Ten Idylls =

Anthology of ten long Tamil poems

The Ten Idylls, known as Pattuppāṭṭu (Tamil: பத்துப்பாட்டு) or Ten Lays, is an anthology of ten longer poems in the Sangam literature – the earliest known Tamil literature. They range between about 100 and 800 lines, and the collection includes the celebrated Nakkīrar's Tirumurukāṟṟuppaṭai (lit. "Guide to Lord Murukan"). The collection was termed as "Ten Idylls" during the colonial era, though this title is considered "very incorrect" by Kamil Zvelebil – a scholar of Tamil literature and history. He suggests "Ten Lays" as the more apt title. Five of these ten ancient poems are lyrical, narrative bardic guides (arruppatai) by which poets directed other bards to the patrons of arts such as kings and chieftains. The others are guides to religious devotion (Murugan) and to major towns, sometimes mixed with akam- or puram-genre poetry.

The Pattuppāṭṭu collection is a later dated collection, with its earliest layer composed sometime between 2nd and 3rd century CE, the middle between 2nd and 4th century, while the last layer sometime between 3rd and 5th century CE.

== The collection ==
According to Zvelebil, the Pattuppāṭṭu compilation is as follows:

Ten Lays or Ten Idylls
Poem	Poem title's meaning	Author	Dedication / Focus	Lines in poems	Meter
Tirumurukāṟṟuppaṭai	"Guide to Lord Murugan"	Nakkīrar	Murugan	312	Akaval
Poruṇarāṟṟuppaṭai	"Guide for the war bards"	Mutattamakkanniyar	Karikal	248	Akaval, some vanci
Ciṟupāṇāṟṟuppaṭai	"Guide to bards with small lutes"	Narrattanar	Nalliyakkotan	296	Akaval
Perumpāṇāṟṟuppaṭai	"Guide to bards with large lutes"	Uruttiran Kannanar	Tontaiman Ilantiraiyan	500	Akaval
Mullaippāṭṭu	"Song about the forest (life)"	Nappitanar	Anonymous	103	Akaval
Maturaikkāñci	"Reflection on Maturai"	Mankuti Marutanar	Netunceliyan	782	Vanci, some akaval
Neṭunalvāṭai	"Good long northern wind"	Nakkirar	Netunceliyan	188	Akaval
Kuṟiñcippāṭṭu	"Song about the hills"	Kapilar	Anonymous	261	Akaval
Paṭṭiṉappālai	"Poem about the separation and the city"	Uruttiran Kannanar	Karikal	301	Vanci (153), akaval (138)
Malaipaṭukaṭām	"Poem of the sound pertaining to the mountains"	Perunkunrur, Perunkaucikanar	Nannan	583 (Note: Zvelebil states it has 583 lines. Other scholars such as Fred Clothey state that the Malaipaṭukaṭām has many more lines. According to Chellaih, the poem has 763 lines.)	Akaval

== Inscriptions ==
Two Shaivite Hindu temple inscriptions have been discovered in Tamil Nadu which allude to and quote lines from the Pattuppāṭṭu collection. The first found in one of the inscriptions at Veerateeswarar temple is dated 1012 CE and attributed to Rajaraja I. The inscription is in the form of an Pattuppāṭṭu arruppatai in the same meter as those found in Pattuppāṭṭu, and alludes to the poet Kapilar. The second inscription is found in Rishabeshwarar temple in Chengam. Its author and patron are unknown, but palaeographically from the 12th-century Chola period. The inscription quotes lines from this collection and mentions the title Mali-katam-pattu (an anagram of Malaipaṭukaṭām). These inscription show that the collection of these poems were an integral part of the Shaiva tradition literature and revered in the context of their temples.

== Publication ==
U. V. Swaminatha Iyer rediscovered the palm-leaf manuscripts of the Pattuppāṭṭu along with other Sangam literature in Shaiva monasteries during the late 19th century. The Ten Idylls were published in 1889. Over time, additional manuscripts – suggesting some early rediscoveries were partially damaged and incomplete – were discovered in temples, monasteries and private collections in India. Eva Wilden has compiled and published a catalog of important manuscripts of Pattuppāṭṭu preserved in major libraries.

== Translations ==
- Pattupattu – Ten Tamil Idylls by J. V. Chellaih (1946)
- Ancient Tamil Classic Pattuppattu in English (The Ten Tamil Idylls) by A. Dakshinamurthy (2012)

== See also ==
- Hindu texts
- Sangam literature
