= Kuṟuntokai =

Classical, Sangam era, Tamil poetic anthology

Kuṟuntokai (Tamil: குறுந்தொகை, meaning the collection of short (ones)) is a classical Tamil poetic work and traditionally the second of the Eight Anthologies (Ettuthokai) in the Sangam literature. The collection belongs to the akam (love) category, and each poem consists of 4 to 8 lines each (except poem 307 and 391 which have 9 lines). The Sangam literature structure suggests that the original compilation had 400 poems, but the surviving Kuruntokai manuscripts have 402 poems. According to Takanobu Takahashi – a Tamil literature scholar, these poems were likely composed between 100 CE and 300 CE based on the linguistics, style and dating of the authors. Kamil Zvelebil, a Tamil literature and history scholar, states that the majority of the poems in the Kuruntokai were likely composed between the 1st century BCE and the 2nd century CE. The Kuruntokai manuscript colophon states that it was compiled by Purikko (உரை), however nothing is known about this compiler or the patron.

The Kuruntokai poems are credited to 205 ancient poets. Of these, according to Kamil Zvelebil, about 30 poets names are of North Indian roots (Indo-Aryan) and rest are of Dravidian roots. The poems include Sanskrit loan words, contain 27 allusions to historical events and there are 10 borrowings from this work into the two famed post-Sangam Tamil works: Tirukkural and Silappatikaram.

== Translations ==
- Translated to English by Professor A. Dakshinamurthy as 'Kuruntokai– An Anthology of Classical Tamil Poetry'
- Translated to English by Dr.Jayanthasri Balakrishnan. It shall be noted that she was awarded doctorate in the early days of career for her study in the English renderings of the text.
- Translated to Assamese as 'Kurundoheir Kabita' by Bijoy Sankar Barman

== Example ==
A poem from Kuruntokai is the famous Red earth and pouring rain by the Sangam age poet Sembula Peyaneerar.

யாயும் ஞாயும் யாரா கியரோ
எந்தையும் நுந்தையும் எம்முறைக் கேளிர்
யானும் நீயும் எவ்வழி யறிதும்
செம்புலப் பெயனீர் போல
அன்புடை நெஞ்சம் தாங்கலந் தனவே.

- குறுந்தொகை 40, செம்புலப் பெயனீரார், குறிஞ்சித் திணை – தலைவன் தலைவியிடம் சொன்னது

Translation:

What is my mother to yours?
How is my father related to yours?
Although you and I knew not each other in any way
just as red earth and pouring rain:
the love-filled hearts merged.

- Kurunthokai 40, Red earth and pouring rain, Kurinji Thinai – What the hero said to the heroine, about their love

This poem is the verse 40 in the Kuruntokai anthology. The image of "red earth and pouring rain" evokes pictures of the first monsoon rains falling on the red-earthed hills typical of the Tamil lands to mingle with the dry, parched soil forming a cool, damp clay, and of the flowers blooming in the rain. The mood created is that of lovers, clandestinely meeting in the hills, their hearts waking suddenly, unexpectedly, to each other.

A second level of meaning is created by the imagery of progression. The poem opens with the possible bonds of friendship, and then kinship, between the parents. Then, it moves to bonds formed by two people learning and getting to know each other. From these abstractions, it comes to concreteness with the picture of red earth in the rain, drawing a parallel with the lover's journey from aloneness to union.

Finally, there is the image of the kurinji flower itself. Though never mentioned in the poem, it is nonetheless present as a fundamental part of a landscape of hills. A kurinji flower only blooms once in twelve years, the period associated in Tamil tradition with the coming of a girl to sexual maturity. Unspoken, but present, in the poem through the image of the flower is a sense of a woman awakening to herself and to union.

== In popular culture ==
The influence of Kuruntokai can be seen in contemporary Tamil movies. The 40th poem has been used in the song Narumagaye in Iruvar and in the song Yaayum in Sagaa which was itself a remake of the song Yaayum from the Singapore Tamil drama Kshatriyan. The very first poem of Kuruntokai was vigorously referred to in the composing of song Senthoora in Bogan.

In Kochadaiyaan (2014), the song Idhyam contains several reference from 18th and 38th poem of Kuruntokai.

Recent usage is the song Nallai Allai in Katru Veliyidai (2017) film directed by Maniratnam which was inspired by the 47th poem authored by Neduvennilavinār.

== See also ==
- Eight Anthologies
- Eighteen Greater Texts
- Sangam literature
