= Naṟṟiṇai =

Classical work of Tamil literature

Natrinai (Tamil: நற்றிணை meaning excellent tinai) is a classical work of Tamil literature, and traditionally the first of the Eight Anthologies (Ettuthokai) in Sangam literature. The collection – sometimes spelled as Natrinai or Narrinai – contains both akam (love) and puram (war, public life) category poems. The anthology includes 400 poems, mainly consisting of 9 to 12 lines, with a few ranging from 8 to 13 lines. According to Takanobu Takahashi, a Tamil literature scholar, the Natrinai poems were likely composed between 100–300 CE, based on linguistic features, style, and the dating of their authors. Kamil Zvelebil, another scholar of Tamil literature and history, dates some poems to the 1st century BCE. According to its manuscript colophon, Natrinai was compiled under the patronage of a Pandyan king named Pannatu Tanta Pantiyan Maran Valuti, though the compiler remains anonymous.

The poems are attributed to 175 ancient poets. Two of the poems are credited to the patron king. According to Zvelebil, the collection includes a few Sanskrit loanwords and makes 59 references to historical events. Several lines were later borrowed into renowned post-Sangam Tamil works such as the Tirukkural, Silappatikaram, and Manimekalai. The Tamil legend of Kannagi (or Kannaki), who tore off her breast in protest of her husband's wrongful execution, appears in Natrinai 312.

== Translations ==
The text was translated by A. Dakshinamurthy and published by the International Institute of Tamil Studies, Chennai in 2000.
