= Akanaṉūṟu =

Work of classical Tamil literature

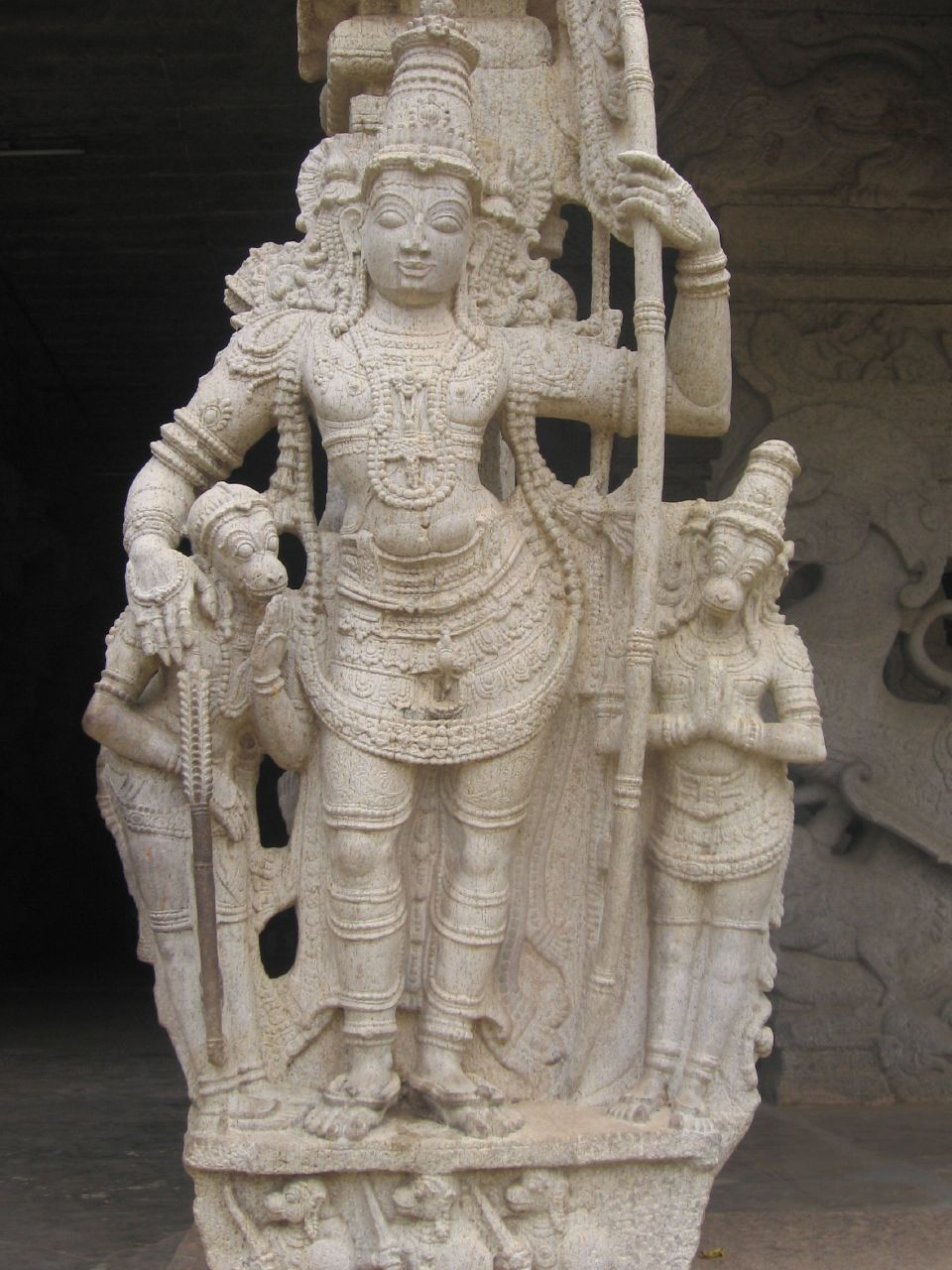
Man-size sculpture of Sri Rama in Srivaikuntanathan Perumal temple located in Tamil Nadu

The Akananuru (Tamil: அகநானூறு, Akanāṉūṟu, literally "four hundred [poems] in the akam genre"), sometimes called Nedunthokai (lit. "anthology of long poems"), is a classical Tamil poetic work and one of the Eight Anthologies (Ettuthokai) in the Sangam literature. It is a collection of 400 love poems composed by 144 poets, except three poems which are by anonymous author(s). The poems range between 13 and 31 lines, and are long enough to include more details of the subject, episode and its context. According to Kamil Zvelebil – a Tamil literature and history scholar, they are "one of the most valuable collections" from ancient Tamil history perspective.

The Akananuru anthology is notable for its mathematical arrangement: the odd number poems are dedicated to palai (arid landscape); poem number ten and its multiples (10, 20, 30, etc., up to 400) are neytal (coastal landscape); poems bearing number 2 and then in increments of 6 followed by 4 (that is number 8, 12, 18, 22, 28, etc.) belong to the kuṟiñci (mountainous landscape); poems bearing number 4 and then in increments of 10 (14, 24, 34, 44, etc.) are mullai (pastoral forests); poems with number 6 and then in increments of 10 (16, 26, 36, etc.) are marutam (riverine farmlands). The anthology was compiled by Uruttiracanman, the son of Maturai Uppurikuti Kilan under the patronage of the Pandyan king Ukkiraperuvaluti. The Akananuru poems offer many valuable cultural insights as well as historically significant evidence and allusions. For example, poem 69, 281 and 375 mention the Maurya Empire, poems 251 and 265 allude to the Nandas, the poem 149 mentions Greek-Romans (Yavanas) as trading gold for pepper through Muziris – an ancient Kerala port near Kochi, and a number of poems echo the Hindu puranic legends about Parasurama, Rama, Krishna and others.

According to Kamil Zvelebil – a scholar of Tamil literature and history, a few poems in the Akananuru were probably composed sometime between 1st century BCE and 2nd century CE, the middle layer between 2nd and 4th century CE, while the last layers were completed sometime between 3rd and 5th century CE. Other names for Akananuru include Ahappattu, Ahananuru, and Agananuru.

== Authors ==
As many as 145 poets are said to have contributed to Akananuru collection. Perunthevanaar, who translated the Mahabharatham into Tamil, is one of the authors. Rudrasarman compiled this anthology at the behest of the Pandya king Ukkiraperuvazhuthi.

== Ramayana Reference ==
The Akanāṉūṟu has a reference to the Ramayana in poem 70. The poem places a triumphant Rama at Dhanushkodi, sitting under a Banyan tree, involved in some secret discussions, when the birds are chirping away. This seems to indicate that the story of the Ramayana was familiar in the Tamil lands before the Kamba Ramayanam of the 12th century.

(Sri Rama's Victory)
Now, the dinsome village is wrapped up in silence
Like unto the banyan tree of many a stilt root
From the branches of which birds chirped ceaselessly
And which the triumphant Rama stilled
With a show of his hand,
That he might discuss in peace secret matters.
At the hoary Tanushkoti upon the shore —
The town of the great Pandyas,
The wielders of victorious spears –,
A town where women would collect blooms of neytal
With rounded stems
Which would blossom amidst green foliage
In the watery fields, hard by the shore,
Where the fresh and golden blossoms of Nalal
And punnai trees shed their pollen
And make picturesque the sand —-,
To adorn themselves on festival days.
—Akananuru: Palai 70, Translated by A. Dakshinamurthy

== Krishna leela Reference ==
The Akananuru mentions Various Vishnu avatharams such as Parasurama, Rama, Krishna and others. According to Alf Hiltebeitel – an Indian Religions and Sanskrit Epics scholar, the Akanaṉūṟu has the earliest known mentions of some stories such as "Krishna stealing sarees of Gopis" which is found later in north Indian literature, making it probable that some of the ideas from Tamil Hindu scholars inspired the Sanskrit scholars in the north and the Bhagavata Purana, or vice versa. However the text Harivamsa which is complex, containing layers that go back to the 1st or 2nd centuries BCE, Consists the parts of Krishna Playing with Gopis and stealing sarees.

== Date ==
The Akananuru poems were likely composed later in the Sangam period than other akam poetry based on the linguistic evidence, the introduction of mathematical arrangement, and given the mention of overseas trade and north Indian dynasties. According to Takanobu Takahashi, the Akananuru poems were composed over several centuries, likely from 1st to 3rd century CE. Other scholars such as Vaiyapuri Pillai chronologically place the Akanaṉūṟu after the Narrinai and Kuṟuntokai anthologies. According to Kamil Zvelebil, except for a few Akananuru poems such as 10, 35, 140 which were probably completed between 1st century BCE and 2nd century CE, while few poems are believed to be composed around the late 2nd century BCE based on the mentions of the Maurya and the Nanda empire. Most of the Akananuru was likely composed sometime between the 2nd and 5th century CE.

== Poetic characteristics ==
Aganaṉūṟu book comes under the Agam category in its subject matter. The poems of this anthology are of the Akaval meter. Akananuru contains 401 stanzas and is divided into three sections

1. Kalintruyanainirai (களிற்றுயானைநிறை), 121 stanzas
2. Manimidaipavalam (மணிமிடைபவளம்), 180 stanzas
3. Nittilakkovai (நித்திலக்கோவை), 100 stanzas

== English Translations ==
Bharathidasan University has published a full translation of all the 400 songs by A. Dakshinamurthy in 3 volumes in 1999:

(The heroine's companion consoles her friend at the advent of the rainy season)

The rumbling clouds winged with lightning
Poured amain big drops of rain and augured the rainy season;
Buds with pointed tips have sprouted in the jasmine vines;
The buds of Illam and the green trunk Kondrai have unfolded soft;
The stags, their black and big horns like twisted iron
Rushed up toward the pebbled pits filled with water
And leap out jubilantly having slaked their thirst;
The wide expansive Earth is now free
From all agonies of the summer heat
And the forest looks exceedingly sweet;
Behold there O friend of choicest bangles!
Our hero of the hilly track will be coming eftsoon,
Driving fast his ornate chariot drawn by the steeds
With waving plumes and trimmed manes
When the stiffly tugged reins
Will sound like the strumming of Yal.
As he drives, he has the chariot bells tied up
So as not to disturb the union of bees
That live on the pollen of the blossoms in the bushes.
He rushes onward thinking all along of your great beauty.
O friend whose fragrance is like unto the blossoming Kantal
On the mountain, tall and huge, east of Urantai of dinsome festivity!
—Akananuru: Mullai 4, Translated by A. Dakshinamurthy

== See also ==
- Eight Anthologies
- Eighteen Greater Texts
- Sangam literature
