= Lina (disambiguation) =

Lina is a female given name, surname and nickname.

Lina may also refer to:

- 468 Lina, a main belt asteroid that was named after the family housemaid of the discoverer
- LINA (software), enables users to run applications compiled for Linux under Windows and Mac OS X
- Linear A, an ancient writing system with ISO 15924 code Lina
- Lina (American singer), American R&B singer
- Lina (entertainer), South Korean singer and musical theatre actress
- Lina gård Swedish estate
- Liga Nacional de Fútbol Profesional de Honduras, premier Honduran association football league

== See also ==
- Li Na (disambiguation), name of some Chinese people
- Linna (disambiguation)
- St. Lina
- POI v Lina
- Lina's sunbird
- Enantia lina
- Apa Lină
