= Ay Andiran =

Early historic south Indian ruler

- Ruler of the Ays; One of Last seven great patrons
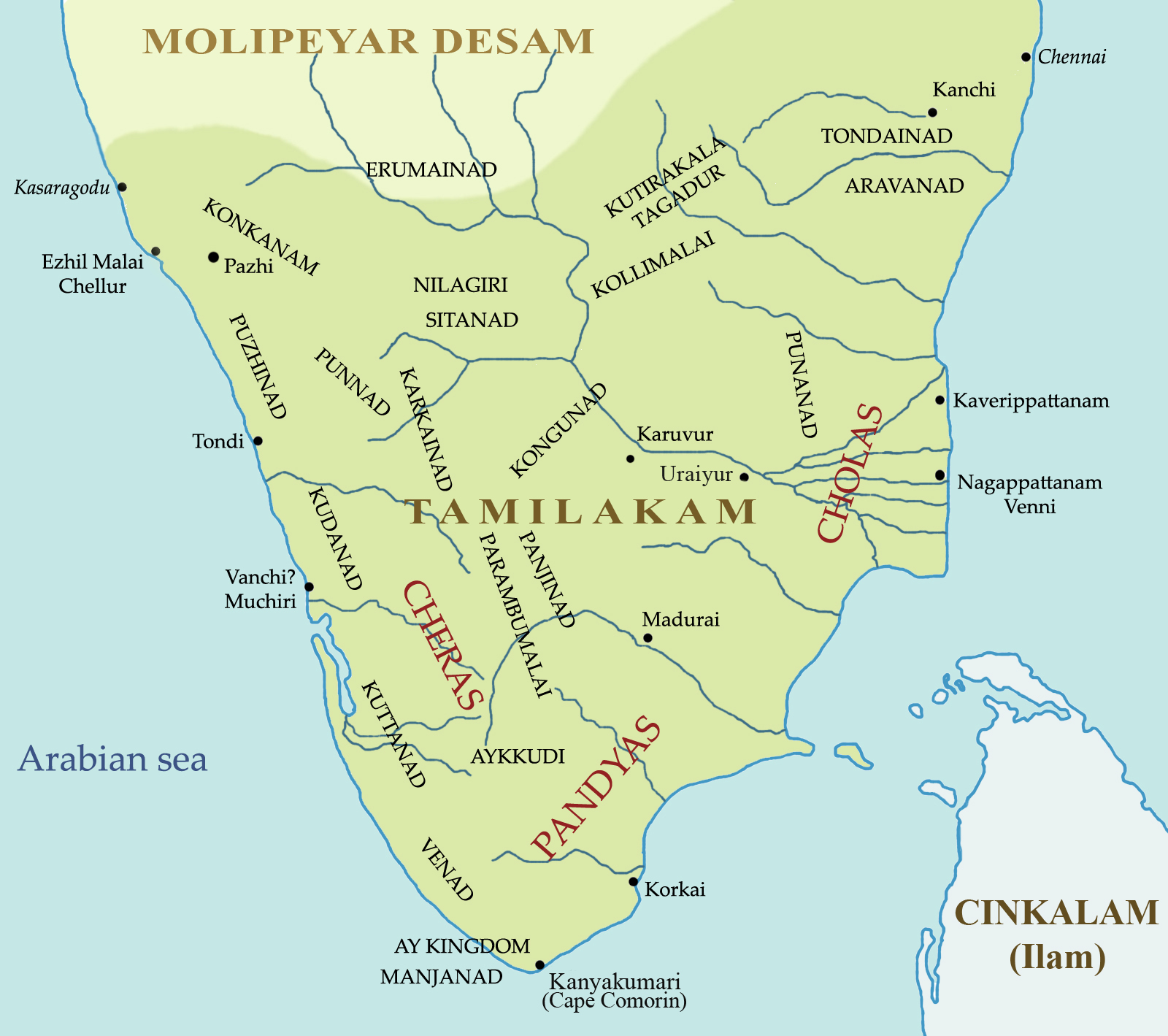
- Reign: fl. 2nd century AD
- House: Ay dynasty

Ay Andiran (fl. 2nd century AD) was a velir or hill chieftain of the Ay dynasty who ruled over the Pothigai Hills and the surrounding regions, including the south-western Malabar Coast, of the Tamil country in southern India during the early historic period. He was an elder contemporary of the Chera ruler Anthuvan Cheral (dated to c. 140 CE).

In the Sangam Literature (the early historic Tamil corpus), particularly in Purananuru (quatrain 128) and Kurunthokai (quatrain 84), he is mentioned as the Lord of the Pothigai Hills (or the Pothiyil-malai) in the Western Ghats. His headquarters was probably located at Aykudi in the Western Ghats. He is extolled in Sangam poetry for his benevolence toward poets, musicians, and dancing girls and is counted among the Last Seven Great Patrons (Kadai Ezhu Vallal) .

== Reign ==
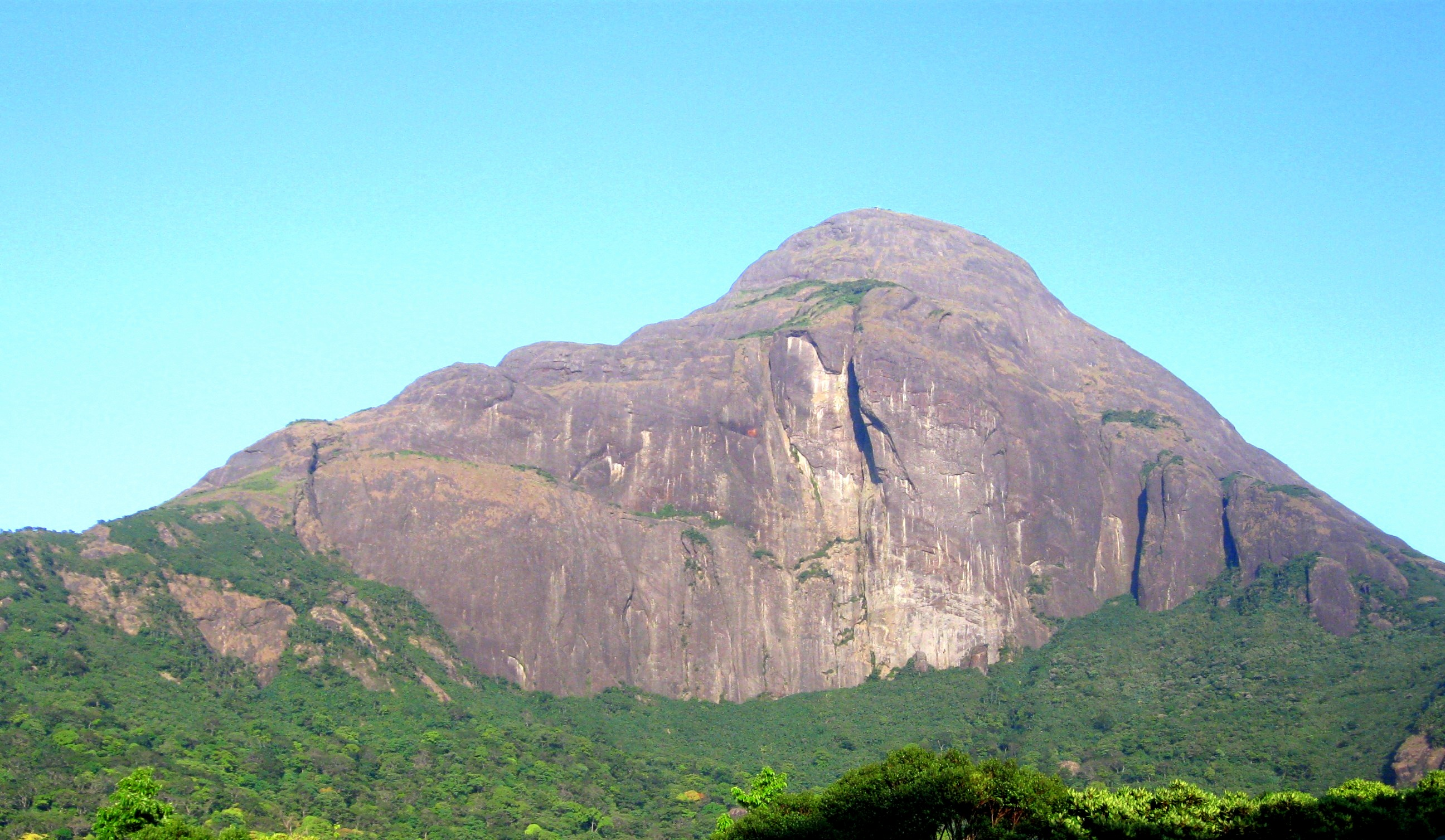
Pothigai Hills

In Sangam Literature, Ay Andiran is portrayed as a ruler who held dominion over the Pothigai Hills in the southern stretches of the Western Ghats — densely forested and rich in elephants — which he employed extensively in warfare. The luxurious "palace" of Ay Andiran is also described in Purananuru (quatrain 127).

Poems praising Andiran, composed by the poet Uraiyur Eniseri Mudamosiyar, feature in Purananuru (quatrain 127-135 and 241). He is also mentioned by poets such as Paranar (Akananuru 152 and 198), Mosi Kiran (Kurunthokai 84), Kavirippumpattinam Karikkannar (Natrinai 237), Umathur Kizhar Parangotranar (Akananuru 69), Thuraiyur Odai Kizhar (Purananuru 136), and in Sirupanatruppadai (lines 96-99). In Akananuru (quatrain 15), his name appears alongside other minor Tamil rulers such as Nannan, Nalli, Pindan, and Thitthan Veliyan.

=== Battle against the Kongu rulers ===
Purananuru (quatrain 129-130) mentions the battles Andiran fought against the rulers of the Kongu country (present-day western Tamil Nadu). The Kongars (the people of the Kongu country) are described as launching an attack on Andiran's territory with a large force of spearmen. The poems recount that Andiran deployed his elephant corps, defeated the invaders, and drove them back toward "the western sea".

== Patronage ==
Andiran is celebrated as one of the Last Seven Great Patrons (Kadai Ezhu Vallal) in the Sangam Collections such as Sirupanatruppadai and Purananuru. He extended generous patronage to poets and singers in his court, rewarding them with elephants, horses, and chariots. The poet Mosiyar's songs repeatedly praise the wealth of Andiran's land and his acts of generosity.

On one occasion, a "blue naga" is said to have visited Andiran and gifted him a fine cloth. The naga explained that he had obtained the cloth through penance and that whoever wore it would be blessed with prosperity and long life. Believing it improper for a mortal to retain a divine gift, Andiran accepted the cloth as a gesture of respect but later dedicated it to the god Shiva (the Al-mara-selvan) at a temple.

== Death ==
The death of Ay Andiran is mentioned by poets Kuttuvan Kiranar and Mosiyar in Purananuru (quatrains 240 and 241; respectively). Kiranar records that Andiran’s wives immolated themselves on his funeral pyre.

== Succession ==
Ay Titiyan, also known as Podiyil Chelvan, may have succeeded Ay Andiran as the Ay chief. The exact identity of Andiran's successor has not been well established, but in Sangam literature Titiyan is referred to as his successor.
