= Nalli =

Nalli may refer to:

- Nalî (1800–?), Kurdish poet
- Nalli (ruler), a velir king of ancient Tamil country
- Nalli (surname), a last name
- Nalli, Sattur, a village in Sattur taluk, India
- Nalli (wardrobe store), an Indian wardrobe store and silk saree emporium

== See also ==
- Nali (disambiguation)
