= Ashwini Kumar Upadhyay v. Union of India =

2020 Supreme Court case about Places of Worship Act

- Court: Supreme Court of India
- Full case name: Ashwini Kumar Upadhyay vs. Union of India & Ors.
- Started: 2020
- Citation: WP (Civil) No. 1246 of 2020

Case history
- Related action: 2019 Supreme Court verdict on Ayodhya dispute

Court membership
- Judges sitting: Sanjiv Khanna (Chief Justice), K. V. Viswanathan, P. V. Sanjay Kumar

Laws applied
- Constitution of India, Places of Worship (Special Provisions) Act, 1991

Ashwini Kumar Upadhyay v. Union of India, WP (Civil) 1246/2020, also known as the Places of Worship Act case, is an ongoing litigation before the Supreme Court of India examining the constitutional validity of the Places of Worship Act, 1991, which prohibits the conversion of any place of worship and provides for the maintenance of the religious character of any place of worship. The lead petition, filed by advocate and BJP leader Ashwini Kumar Upadhyay, challenges the Sections 2–4 of the act arguing that the law infringes on religious freedom and constitutional secularism. The case has significant implications for several ongoing disputes over religious sites in India, including the Gyanvapi mosque in Varanasi and the Shahi Eidgah mosque in Mathura.

== Background ==
The Places of Worship (Special Provisions) Act, 1991, was enacted by the P. V. Narasimha Rao government during the peak of the Ram Janmabhoomi movement. The Act's stated objective was to freeze the status of all places of worship as they were on 15 August 1947, and to prevent future disputes over their religious character. Section 3 of the Act bars the conversion of a place of worship of any religious denomination into a place of worship of a different religious denomination. Section 4 declares that the religious character of a place of worship shall continue to be the same as it was on the date of India's independence. The only exception made in the Act, under Section 5, was for the Ram Janmabhoomi-Babri Masjid site in Ayodhya. In its 2019 verdict on the Ayodhya dispute, a five-judge Constitution Bench of the Supreme Court, while awarding the disputed site for the construction of a Ram temple, had commented on the 1991 Act. The Court stated that the Act "is a legislative instrument designed to protect the secular features of the Indian polity, which is one of the basic features of the Constitution."

== Legal challenge and arguments ==
In June 2020, Ashwini Kumar Upadhyay filed a writ petition challenging Sections 2, 3, and 4 of the Places of Worship Act, 1991, with several other similar petitions subsequently filed and tagged with the main case. The petitioners argue that the Act infringes on the fundamental rights to equality (Article 14), non-discrimination (Article 15), and freedom of religion (Articles 25 and 26). They further contend that the Act creates an unconstitutional bar on judicial review, which is a basic feature of the Constitution, by preventing courts from hearing claims over places of worship converted before 1947. The challenge also targets the choice of 15 August 1947 as an "arbitrary and irrational" cut-off date, which petitioners claim retroactively validates historical wrongs committed against their religious sites. The petitions also question the Parliament of India's legislative competence to make laws on "pilgrimages", a subject on the State List of the Constitution's Seventh Schedule, and assert that the Act violates secularism by creating an exception for the Ayodhya dispute while denying similar recourse to other communities.

=== Proceedings ===
The Supreme Court issued notice to the Government of India on the petition in March 2021. Since then, the case has been heard by multiple benches. The Union government has repeatedly sought extensions to file a "comprehensive" counter-affidavit detailing its stance on the law, but as of early 2025, it had not yet done so. Several political parties and Muslim organizations, including the Jamiat Ulema-e-Hind and the All India Majlis-e-Ittehadul Muslimeen, have intervened in the case, supporting the Act and arguing that it is essential for maintaining communal harmony. In January 2024, a bench headed by Chief Justice D. Y. Chandrachud referred the pleas to a three-judge bench. In subsequent hearings, the court expressed displeasure at the filing of numerous new petitions and intervention applications, with the Chief Justice stating, "We cannot keep these petitions pending endlessly. There has to be an end to this." The court has indicated it will only entertain applications that raise new legal grounds.

== Significance and implications ==
The case is highly anticipated due to its far-reaching implications. A decision to strike down the Act or dilute its provisions could enable further litigation aimed at reclaiming religious sites across the country, similar to the Ayodhya dispute. Proponents of the Act argue that its repeal would lead to widespread communal conflict and disturb social harmony. Conversely, those challenging the Act argue that it denies justice and perpetuates historical wrongs. The case is seen as a major test for the constitutional principles of secularism, equality, and judicial review in India. The government's prolonged delay in clarifying its official stance has also been a significant point of discussion.
