= Ay dynasty =

Dynasty from southern India

- Capital: Podiyil Hills or the Aykudi (early historic); Vizhinjam (medieval)
- Government: Chieftaincy (early historic); Monarchy (medieval)
Succeeded by
Venad (historical region)
- Today part of: Kerala; Tamil Nadu

Ay dynasty (transliteration: Āy, IPA: [aːj]), also known as Kupaka in medieval period, (Note: The title "Kupaka" (Attingal; in Malayalam) was later used to denote the ruler of Venad, the successor state to the Ay kingdom in south India.) was an Tamil dynasty which controlled the south-western tip of South India, from the early historic period up to the medieval period. The clan traditionally held sway over the port of Vizhinjam, the fertile region of Nanjinad, and southern parts of the spice-producing Western Ghat mountains. The Ays were traditionally subject to the Pandya rulers of Madurai.

The Ay formed one of the major rulers of early historic Kerala, along with the Cheras of central Kerala and the rulers of Ezhimalai in the north. Greek geographer Claudius Ptolemy (2nd century CE) described the "Aioi" territory as extending from the Baris (Pamba) to Cape Comorin (Kanyakumari). The elephant was the emblem of the early historic Ay rulers.

The Ay kingdom, whose ancient rulers could, at that time, be considered among the several "political chiefs", functioned as a buffer state between the powerful Pandyas/Cholas and the Cheras (Kerala) during the medieval period. A number of kings such as Chadayan Karunanthan (c. 788/89 CE), Karunandatakkan "Srivallabha" (r. c. 856/57 – 884 CE), and Vikramaditya "Varaguna" (r. c. 884 – 911/920 CE) figure as the Ay chiefs of the port of Vizhinjam. Shifts in allegiance between the Pandyas and Cheras persisted, with the Ay rulers adopting Pandya surnames, yet they refrained from using Pandya regnal years in their inscriptions, signalling their continued autonomy despite their affiliation. Historians assume that the Ay were a leading power in south Kerala till c. 10th century CE.

== Origins ==
The medieval Ay lineage claimed its origins from the Velir Hill-Princes of the same name (the Ays) from early historic (pre-Pallava) Tamilakam. Members of the Ay family of the Podiyil Hills (the Aykudi) were likley related to the early historic Cheras of central Kerala.

Sri Padmanabhaswamy was the tutelary deity of the medieval Ay family and the earlier Velir Ays.

The medieval Ay claimed that they belonged to the Ayar lineage (Parthivapuram Grant and Paliyam Copper Plates). This claim was advanced by the later rulers of Venad and Travancore and the Pillai-Pāri family. The Velir whom the Ays claim lineage from, are also described as having come to the Tamilakam from Thuvārampātti along with Agastya in the early 2nd millennium BC. This is theorised by historians such as Iravatham Mahadevan to contain memories of early migrations of Harrapan people post the period of Harrapan decline.

=== Relation to Travancore Royal Family & other Noble houses ===
It is speculated that after the decline of the Ays, some branches of the Ay family moved their headquarters to Thiruvalla and settled in the vicinity of Kadapra (Niranam). They seem to have appeared in the 12th and 13th centuries as the Chirayavay branch, claiming descent from the "Yadu Kula", and ruled near Thiruvalla with Athanthuruthi as their headquarters.Another prominent line of Ays of Parthivapuram moved to Tirukoilur merging into the Malaiyaman Pillai-Pari house. In the second half of the 13th century, the Chirayavay branch merged with the Kizhperur branch of the Venad family. A branch of the Ay family, which had established itself at Thrippappur, also appears to have later merged with the Kizhperur house.

== History ==
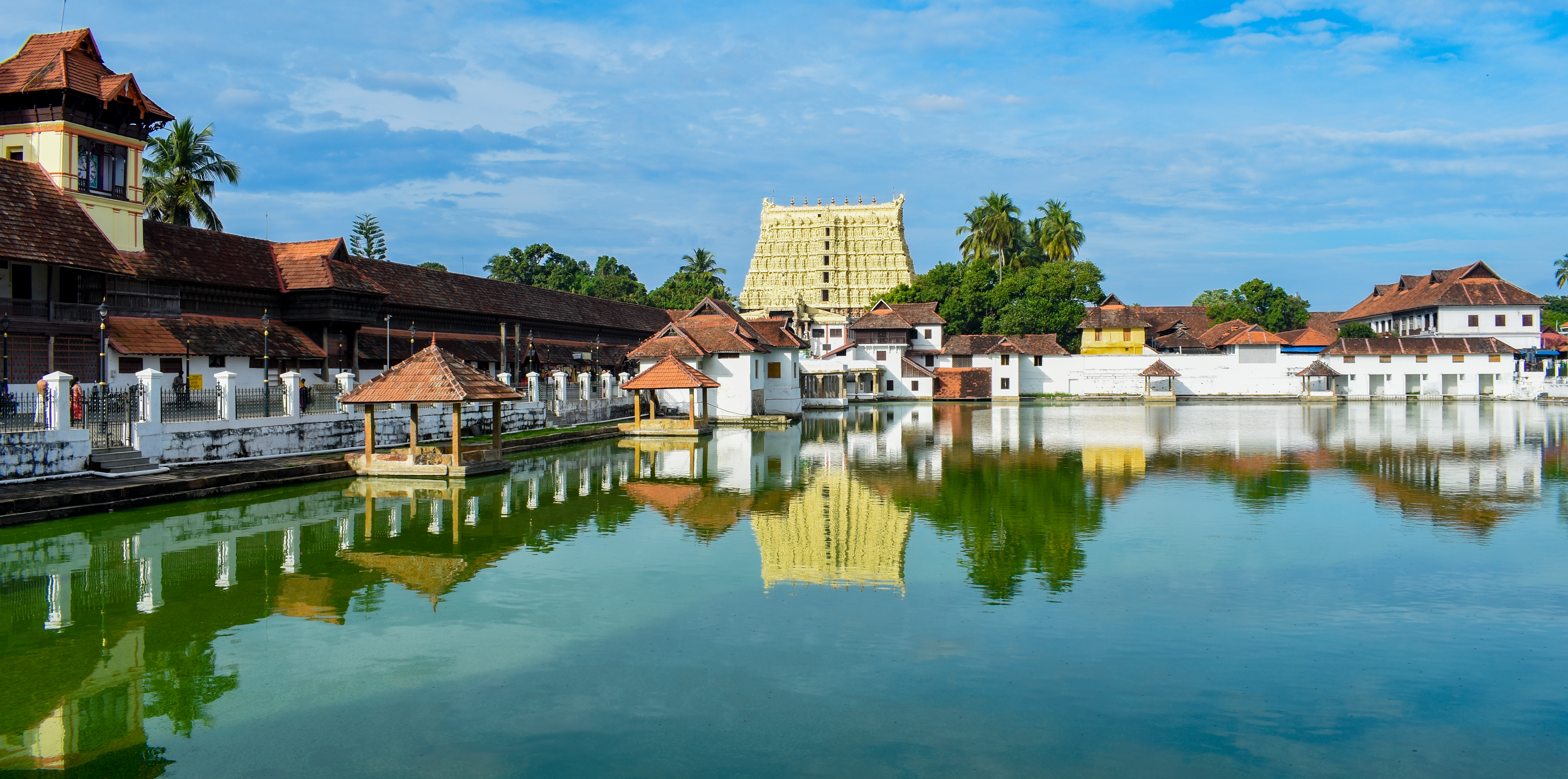
Sri Padmanabhaswamy was the tutelary deity of the medieval Ay family

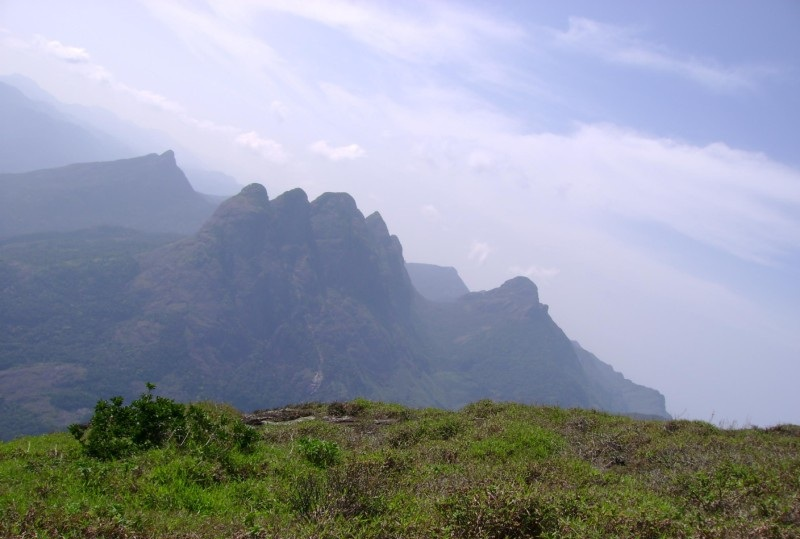
Podiyil Hills (the Aykudi)

The Ay clan were one of the major Princely families of the Velir house of early historic Tamilakam. Members of the Ay family, of the Podiyil Hills or the Aykudi, were related to the early historic Cheras of central Kerala/western Tamilakam. In ancient Tamil literature, they are represented as falling under the influence of the Pandyas at certain times and under the Chera sphere of control at others. Towards the close of the early historic period, Pandya supremacy might have extended to the Ay territory (through it is likely that the Ay gained their independence during the Kalabhra period).

=== Ay chieftains of early historic south India ===
A number of Ay (Ay-Vel) Princes, notably Ay Andiran, Ay Titiyan, and Ay Atiyan were mentioned in the Sangam Corpus circa 650BC-300CE..These rulers were extremely wealthy and were renowned for their charity, morality & generosity. In their possession were numerous elephants, palaces, chariots, and horses, and their powerful control over the mountains of the southernmost section of the Western Ghats, including the prominent Podiyil Hill.

Ay Andiran is praised by early Tamil poets such as Uraiyur Enicheri Muda Mochiyar, Turaiyur Odaikizhar, and Kuttuvan Kiranar in the Purananuru. He is described there as the "Lord of the Podiyil Malai", and is said to have defeated the Kongu chief and driven him as far as the Sea. Andiran was an elder & contemporary of the famous Chera ruler Antuvan Cheral, dated to around c. 140 CE. Ay Titiyan, also known as Podiyil Chelvan, is praised by Paranar and Bhuta Pandya (the Pandya ruler) in the Akananuru, and it appears that he served as a vassal of Bhuta Pandya. Ay Atiyan, the successor of Ay Titiyan, is mentioned by Paranar and Madurai Kanakkayanar in the Akananuru; these poets also note that Podiyil Mala, the Ay stronghold, later became the property of Pachupun Pandya ("the Azhakiya Pandya"), the successor of Bhuta Pandya. An Ay ruler also participated in the famous battle of Talai-yalankanam, in which the Pandya chief Nedum Chezhiyan defeated several of his enemies.

Originally, the entire region of Venad, (Vel Nadu) meaning "the country of the Vel people or Velir ", who were the parent house of the to the Ay dynasty. This formed part of the larger Ay-Vel territory, and members of the Ay family served as Princes & Kings of this Vel country.

Queen Veliyan Venmal Nallini, originally an Ay Princess, was the wife of the renowned Chera ruler, Emperor Utiyan Cheralatan. Another prominent figure, Veliyan Venman Ay Eyinan, either the brother or the uncle of Venmal was among the premier warriors assembled by the famous Chera ruler Perum Cheral Irumporai (c. 190 CE) to oppose Nannan of Ezhimalai (fl. c. 180 CE) in the well-known battle of Pazhi, Venman Ay Eyinan is married to a Malaiyaman dynasty Princess, whose descendant is Yennadhi Kannan. Eyinan, who had once shared a friendship with Nannan, is said to have fallen during the course of the battle while fighting against certain Minjili or Njimili.

=== As medieval political chiefs ===
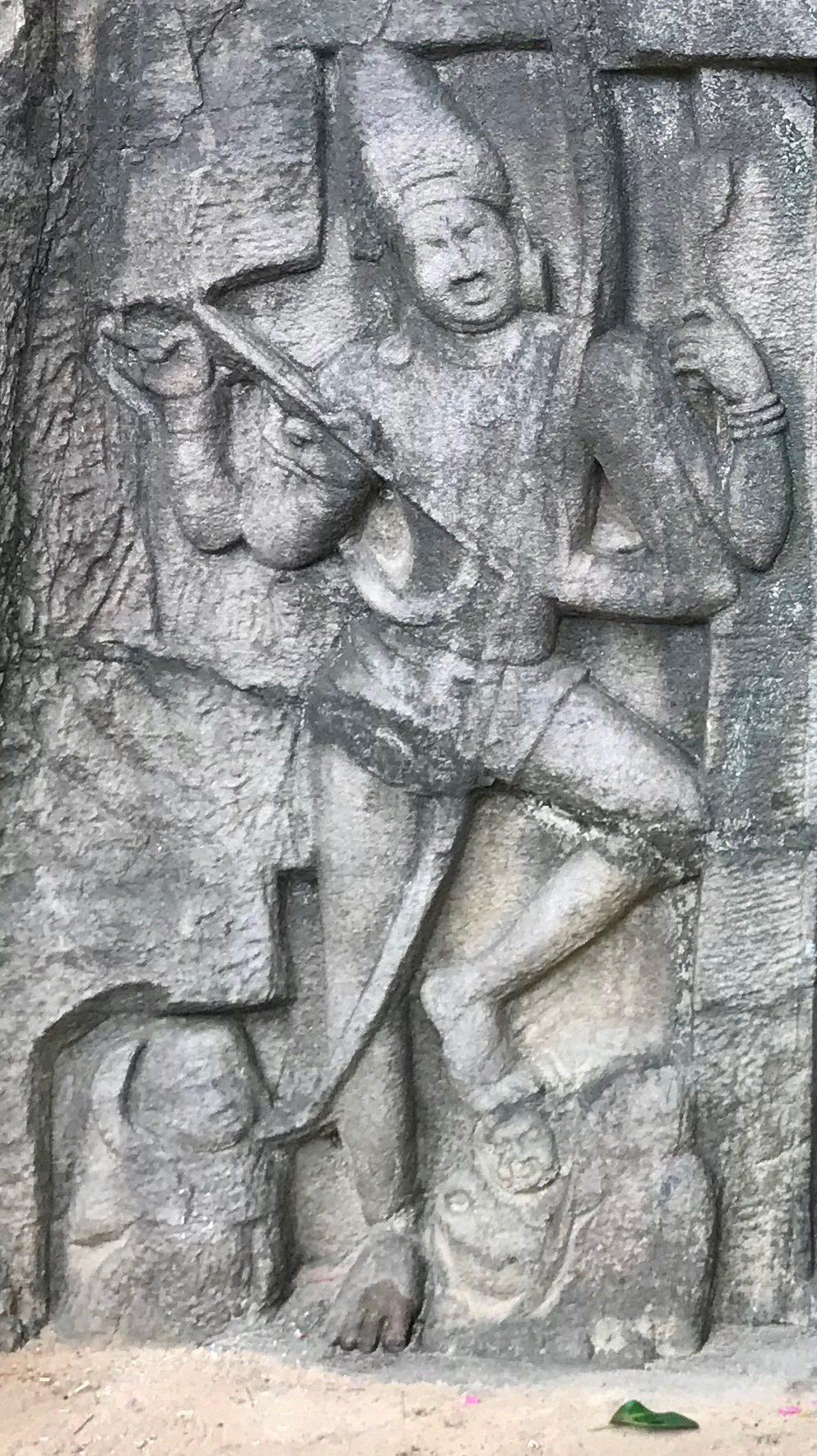
Siva as "Tripurantaka" in Vizhinjam Cave Temple.

The Ay rulers of early medieval south India were among several Princes & "semi-sovereign" kings who acknowledged the authority of major dynasties such as the Cheras or the Pandyasalong with the Mushikas or the Ezhimala rulers of northern Kerala, although some of the Ays ruled independent principalities and kingdoms.

The Ays notably traced their lineage back to the early historic period. Their ancient Velir ancestry distinguished them from other Princely & noble families in the Kerala region, who were typically of more recent origin or had been "nominated" by the medieval Cheras. However, shifts in allegiance between the Pandyas and the Cheras persisted. Although the Ay rulers adopted Pandya royal surnames such as "Srivallabha" and "Varaguna", they did not employ Pandya regnal years in their inscriptions, indicating a degree of autonomy despite the association.

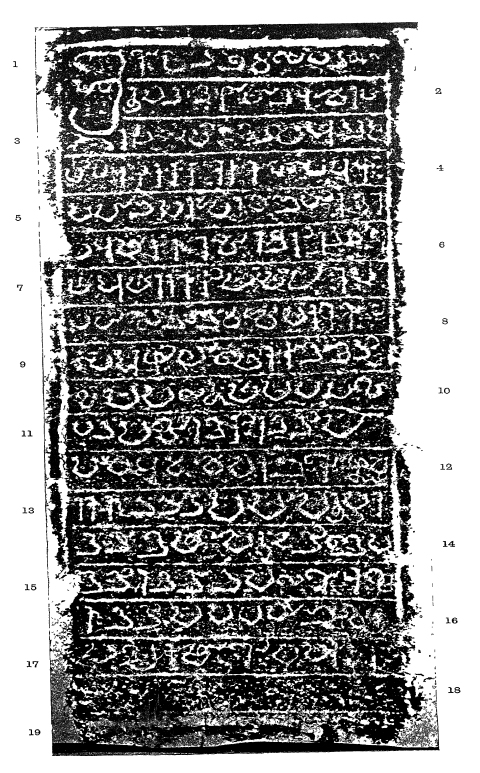
Trivandrum Museum Stone Inscription of Maran Chadayan (latter half of the 8th century)

Inscriptional evidence indicates that renewed Pandya incursions into the southern Kerala began in the mid-8th century CE. Around 765 CE, Pandya king Jatila Paranthaka/Nedum "Maran" Chadayan Varaguna I (r. 765–815 CE) notably sacked the Ay port of Vizhinjam by defeating the Vel King (the "Vel Mannan", who might have been related to the Ay family) and took possession of the Ay-Vel country ("the fertile country along with its magnificent treasures") (Madras Museum Plates of Jatila Parantaka, 17th regnal year). This event is perhaps also remembered in the Velvikkudi plates (3rd regnal year, Nedum Chadayan) as "the suppression of the rebellious Ay-Vel" (or at the battle of "nattukkurumbu").

The Pandya foray into southern Kerala may have drawn the medieval Chera rulers into the conflict, leading to a prolonged Pandya–Ay/Chera struggle. It is recorded that the Pandya king "Maran Chadayan" Jatila Paranthaka destroyed a fort at Aruviyoor (identified with Aruvikkarai near Thalakulam) by defeating Ay ruler Chadayan Karunanthan of "Malai Nadu" in 788/789 CE (dated to 23rd regnal year, Kalukumalai inscription). In 792 CE (27th regnal year, Jatila Paranthaka), the Chera warriors (the Cheramanar Padai) are seen fighting for a fort at Vizhinjam and at Karaikkotta (identified with Karaikkodu near Thalakulam) against a commander of Maran Chadayan (Trivandrum Museum Stone Inscription of Maran Chadayan).

By the 9th century CE, as a result of the encroachments of the Pandyas and the medieval Chera rulers, the ancient Ay territory was partitioned into two portions. Venad (or the Country of the Vel People), with its headquarters at Kollam, came under influence of the medieval Chera rulers of Kerala while the Ay kingdom, or what remained of it, based at Vizhinjam, came under the influence of the Pandya ruler Srimara Srivallabha (r. 815–862). This corroborated by the Larger Cinnamanur Plates, which record a victory of king Srivallabha at the port of Vizhinjam. Karunanthadakkkan "Srivallabha" (r. c. 856/57–884), who served as the Ay vassal under Srimara Srivallabha, is particularly noted for founding the Parthivapuram Salai.

Srimara Srivallabha was succeeded on the Pandya throne by Varaguna II (r. 862–885 CE). The Ay kings of Vizhinjam continued as vassals of the Pandyas, as indicated by the Pandya surname ("Varaguna") borne by king Vikramaditya (r. c. 884–911/920 CE).

The Pandyas were defeated in the "great battle of Sripurambiyam" around 885 CE. The considerable influence of the Chera rulers in the Ay country following this battle is evident in two records discovered from the region. The first is an inscription of Kizhan Adikal Ravi Neeli, queen of the Chera ruler Vijayaraga, preserved at Tirunandikkara, a Shiva temple located in the Ay country. The second is the Paliyam copper plates, which record large land grants made in c. 898 CE by the Ay ruler Vikramaditya "Varaguna" to a Buddhist vihara in the Chera Perumal kingdom.

The later years of Vikramaditya's reign may have coincided with the Chola conquest of the Pandya country under king Parantaka I (c. 910 AD). It is therefore likely that the Ays were liberated from Pandya overlordship during this period. Inscriptions of Parantaka I (907 — 955 AD) have been found at Kuttalam (24th and 36th regnal year) and at Suchindram (40th regnal year) within the Ay country.

== Legacy ==
In general, the influence of the Kerala rulers — such as the chieftains of Venad, who owed allegiance to the medieval Chera rulers seems to have extended into the southern Ay territory in the 10th century CE. By the early 11th century, the entire region, including the port of Vizhinjam and Cape Comorin, had come under the control of the imperial Cholas. The Senur inscription of emperor Rajaraja I, dated to 1005 AD, notably mentions only the ruler of Kollam (i. e., Venad) in southern Kerala.

There is a possibility that the Venad chieftains, following the Chola raids, attempted to recapture the old Ay region. Emperor Rajadhiraja claims to have "confined the undaunted king of Venadu [back] to the Che[ra]natu [from the Ay country]... and liberated the [Ay?] king of Kupaka... and put on a fresh garland of Vanchi flowers after the capturing Kantalur Salai while the strong Villavan [the Chera king] hid himself in terror inside the jungle" (an event dated to c. 1018/19 CE).

A branch of the Ay family, which had established itself at Thrippappur and exercised control over the Padmanabhaswamy Temple, later appears to have merged with the Kizhperur house, the ruling lineage of Venad.

== Major medieval Ay grants ==
Major medieval Ay grants
Grant name	Date	Summary	Image
Karunanthadakkan "Srivallabha" (r. c. 856/57–884 CE)
Parthivapuram Grant (Trivandrum Huzur Office Plates or the "Huzur Office Plates of Kokkarunandadakkar")	Regnal year 9 = 865/66 CE (Ilamkulam; Narayanan, 1972); Regnal year 9 = 869 CE (Krishnan, 1989)	Tamil (ending portion in Sanskrit).; Establishment of Parthasarathy Vishnu Temple, Parthivapuram.; Establishment of Parthivapuram Salai with the temple. Mentions the 'Rules of Parthivapuram Salai'.; Calls the king a member of the 'Nanda and Yadava family'.	Parthivapuram Grant
Perumpaludur Vishnu temple inscription (Trivandrum)	Regnal year 10	Vattezhuthu script.	
Thiruvidaikkodu inscription I	Regnal year 14 = 870 CE (Narayanan, 1972)	Tamil (Vattezhuthu); A private donation to the Thiruvidaikkodu Shiva temple.	Tiruvidaikkodu inscription I
Thiruvidaikkodu inscription II	Regnal year 22 = 878/79 CE (Narayanan, 1972)	Tamil (Vattezhuthu); Donation to the Thiruvidaikkodu Shiva temple by Karunanthadakkkan Srivallabha.	
Vikramaditya "Varaguna" (r. c. 884–911/920 CE)
Thirupparappu Plates	9th century CE	Mentions king Karunanthadakkkan.	Thirupparappu Plates
Thirunandikkarai (Trivandrum Huzur Office Plates)	Regnal year 8 = 892 CE (Narayanan, 1972)	Tamil (Tamil script with Grantha).; Murukan Chendi as the Ay-kula Mahadevi.; Donation of land by Vikramaditya to Murukan Chendi.	Thirunandikkarai Inscription
Paliyam Copper Plates	Regnal year 15 = 898 CE (Revised from 925 AD, Narayanan, 1972)	A large land donation to a Buddhist vihara in central Kerala by Vikramaditya Varaguna.	Paliyam Copper Plates
Chitaral inscription	Regnal year 28	Donative inscription.	

== See also ==
- Vizhinjam
- Pandya dynasty
- Chera dynasty
