= Lavanya =

Lavanya may refer to:

- Lavanya (name), an Indian feminine given name
- Lavanya (TV series), a 2004 Indian television series
- Lavanya (actress) (born 1979), Indian actress
- Lavanya (film), a 1951 Indian Tamil-language film
- Lavanya suicide case, 2022 suicide in India
- Lavanya-sundari, a character in the 11th-century Indian story collection Shringara-manjari-katha

== See also ==
- Lavani, Indian music genre
