= Vikramaditya Varaguna =

- King of the Ays
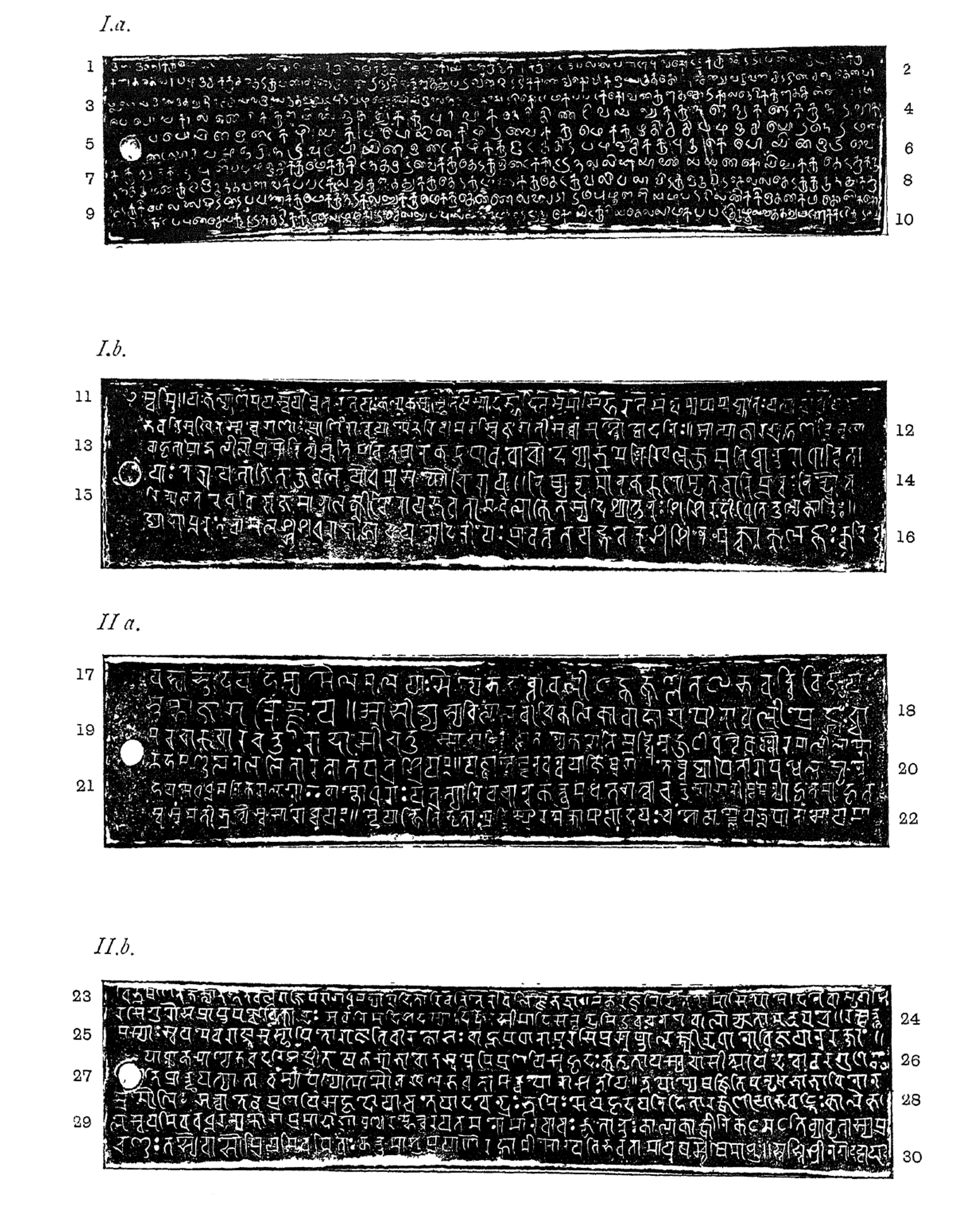
- Paliyam Copper Plates (898 AD)
- Reign: c. 884―911/20 AD
- Predecessor: Karunantadakkan Srivallabha (c. 856/57―884 AD)
- Spouse: Ay-Kula Mahadevi
- House: Ay dynasty
- Religion: Hinduism

Vikramaditya (r. c. 884—911/912 AD or 920 AD) — better known as Vikramaditya "Varaguna"— was the last historically attested ruler of the Ay dynasty in south India. His surname or title indicates that he was a vassal of the Pandya ruler Varaguna II (r. 862—885 AD).

Vikramaditya is described as the ruler of the port of Vizhinjam. He was the immediate successor of Karunanthadakkan (r. c. 856/57–884 AD), the Ay ruler associated with the Parthasarathy Vishnu Temple. The religious pluralism of the Ay rulers during this period is demonstrated by Vikramaditya's various endowments — not only to Hindu temples, but also to a Buddhist vihara in central Kerala and to Jain temples.

The act of donation (898 AD) to a Buddhist vihara outside the Ay country (southern Kerala) is considered as a symbol of friendly attitude towards the medieval Chera rulers of Kerala (after the fall of the Pandyas in the battle of Sripurambiyan in c. 885 AD). Later years of Vikramaditya's reign coincided with the Chola conquest of the Pandya country under king Parantaka (in 910 AD). It is likely that the Ays were thus liberated from the Pandya rule.

== Sources ==
1. Thirupparappu Plates — donation/associated with Thirupparappu Shiva Temple.
2. Thirunandikkarai Plates (regnal year 8 = 892 AD) — donation to Thirunandikkarai Temple by Murukan Chendi or "Ay-kula Mahadevi", the daughter of "Thenganadu Kizhavan".
3. Paliyam Copper Plates (898 AD)
4. Chitharal inscription (regnal year 28 = 911/12 AD) — donation by Kunanthangi Kurattikal, the disciple of Perayakkudi Arattanemi Bhatarar, to the Thiruchanattu Malai Bhatariyar Jain Temple.

Certain "Varaguna" — may be Vikramaditya — the disciple of Thirucharanattu Pattini Bhatarar appears as a donor in an inscription discovered from the temple of Thiruchanattu Malai in Chitharal.

== Paliyam Copper Plates ==
=== Date of Paliyam Copper Plates ===
The currently accepted date of the Paliyam Copper Plates was fixed by historian M. G. S. Narayanan. According to the plates, the grant was issued on a Thursday, in the Solar month of Makara and the Lunar month of Pushya when the star was Mrigasira [on a Sukladwadasi day; falling in the year after the 15th regnal year of "Varaguna"].

Three dates are suitable for the astronomical data contained in the plates.

- 868 AD - suggested by Gopinatha Rao - historically untenable (within the regnal period of the preceding Ay ruler Karunanthadakkkan).
- 925 AD - suggested by Elamkulam P. N. Kunjan Pillai - Outside the regnal period of Pandya king Varaguna II (r. 862—885 AD).
- 898 AD - Currently accepted date (M. G. S. Narayanan) - Within the regnal period of Pandya king Varaguna II.

=== Content ===
The Paliyam Copper Plates refer to the Ay ruler by his Pandya title, "Varaguna", and do not mention the given name "Vikramaditya". The ruler was distinguished from the Pandya ruler of the same name (Varaguna II) on the basis of the reference to the [dynasty of] Vrishni Kula, and the Lord of Vizhinjam.

The inscription is bilingual — composed in Tamil and in Sanskrit using the Nagari script.

According to these plates, in 898 AD, Vikramaditya made a donation of certain lands in the Ay country to the deity of Srimulavasa Buddhist vihara (somewhere in central Kerala, in the kingdom of the medieval Cheras).

- Paliyam Copper Plates open with three Sanskrit slokas in praise of Soudhodani (Buddha), Dharmasangha (Dharma) and Avalokitesvara.
- Describe Varaguna as the "Lord of Vizhinjam" and a member of the "Vrisni Race".
- Show arrangements made to protect the plot (land) handed over to the Srimulavasa vihara. It is tentatively concluded that the king had appointed Vira Goda, a member of the Chera family, to protect the plot.
- Contain request to the king's descendants to "uphold dharma" and protect the land of donation.
- Contain general appeal to all people to turn to "acts of benevolence".
- Tamil portions show the details - such as boundaries - of the plot donated.
