= Lavanda =

Lavanda may refer to:

- Lavanda, Crimea, rural settlement in Crimea
- Lavanda, a unit of the Internal Troops of Ukraine
- "Lavada" (song), a 1985 song by Sofia Rotaru

== See also ==
- Lavanya (name)
- Lavandula
