= Nali =

Nali may refer to:

- Nalî (1797–1869), Kurdish poet
- Náli, a Dwarf of J. R. R. Tolkien's Middle-earth legendarium
- Nali, a dwarf of Norse mythology
- Nali, an alien race in the video game Unreal
- Nali language, an Oceanic language of Papua New Guinea
- Mirza Nali (1784–1860), Mughal crown prince
- Nali Sauce, Malawian hot sauce made from Bird Eye Chilli
- Nali, Iran, village in Sistan and Baluchestan Province, Iran
- Nali (town) (那丽镇), in Qinnan District, Qinzhou, Guangxi, China
- Nali, nickname of the Austrian composer HK Gruber
- Nali, first solo studio album of the Italian singer-songwriter Annalisa
- Nali, a subunit of the Bigha, used for land measurement

== See also ==
- Nalli (disambiguation)
- Li Na (disambiguation), several people also known as Na Li
