= Lavanya (name) =

Lavanya is an Indian feminine given name of Sanskrit origin in use in India, Bangladesh, parts of Pakistan and Nepal. Notable people with this name include the following:

- Lavanya (actress) (born 1979), Indian actress
- Lavanya Bhardwaj (born 1984), Indian actor and model
- Lavanya Nalli, Indian businesswoman
- Lavanya Rajamani (born 1973), Indian lawyer, author and professor
- Lavanya Sundararaman, Indian singer
- Lavanya Tripathi (born 1990), Indian model, actress and dancer

== See also ==
- Lavanya (disambiguation)
- LaTanya, given name
- Lavanda (disambiguation)
