= Ashwini Upadhyay =

Indian politician and lawyer (born 1975)

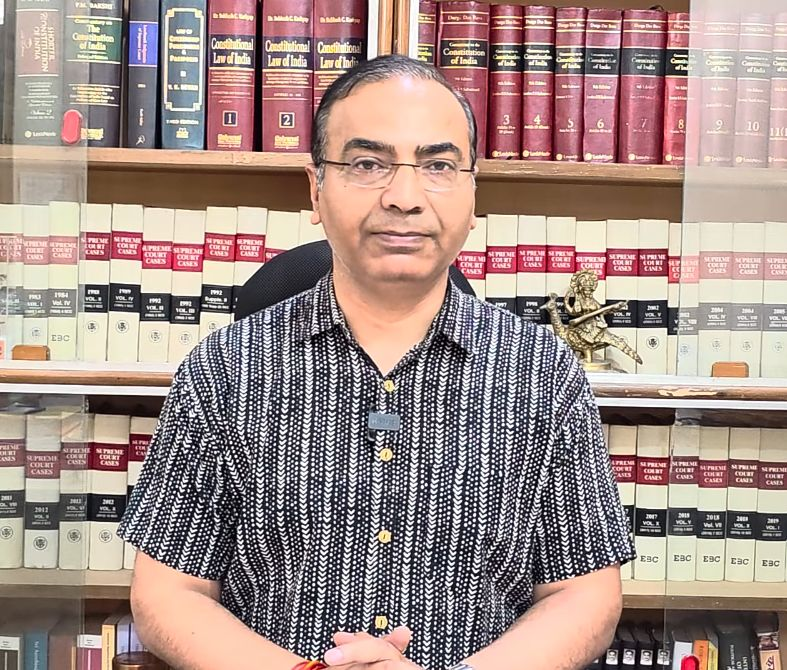
- Ashwini Upadhyay in 2025
- Born: 17 March 1975 (age 51); Prayagraj
- Occupations: politician and lawyer
- Years active: 2011
- Known for: known for filing Public Interest Litigations (PILs)

Ashwini Kumar Upadhyay is a politician and lawyer at the Supreme Court of India and a leader of the Bharatiya Janata Party Delhi unit. In 2011, he quit his job to join Anna Hazare's anti-corruption movement and subsequently joined the newly formed the Aam Aadmi Party of which he was one of the founding members. He is known for filing Public Interest Litigations (PILs).

== Early life and education ==
Upadhyay was born on 17 March 1975 in Prayagraj, Uttar Pradesh. He studied at government school in the city. His first degree and career was in electrical engineering. In 2002 he acquired a law degree from Chaudhary Charan Singh University.

== Public interest litigations ==
Upadhyay is known for regularly filing PILs on a wide range of issues. He has been called the PIL Man of India and has a unique distinction of filing over 50 PILs in a span of 5 years. The Supreme Court has expressed dissatisfaction with his filing PILs on "everything under the sun", telling him that many of these issues should be resolved through the government and not the courts.

Upadhyay has also helped other political leaders raise political issues through PILs. In June 2018, he helped Delhi MLA Kapil Mishra file a PIL against CM Arvind Kejriwal for his low attendance in the assembly and functioning of the house. Through his PIL in August 2021, he has been instrumental in ensuring no criminal cases against MPs and MLAs are withdrawn without the permission of the High Court of the concerned state.

=== Politics and anti corruption ===
Continuing his pursuit for the Janlokpal movement, in 2018 Upadhyay filed a PIL regarding state level appointment for the Lokayukta for which the Supreme Court took note and asked for explanation from 12 states and union territories. He has filed several PILs pertaining to electoral processes. One such PIL seeks Election Commission to restrict parties and candidates whose election has been nullified or declared void from participating in fresh polls. Another PIL seeks the disqualification of candidates who seek votes in the name of caste, religion, community. Further in another PIL by Upadhyay prepared in collaboration with Advocate Vijay Hansaria, he seeks the appointment of special courts to prosecute corrupt political leaders. A PIL by Upadhyay asked for making the manifestoes of political parties as legally enforceable documents. In January 2022, Upadhyay filed a petition to deregister parties that do not file details of criminal activities of their candidates. In 2018 he filed a PIL seeking a cap of Rs 2000 for donations to political parties. AFter this filing, the Supreme Court reprimanded Upadhyay for meaningless PILs, warning him of a ban if this trend continued.

=== Women and family ===
On family issues, Upadhyay filed PIL seeking a Uniform Divorce Law for women. In another one he seeks the Supreme Court to ban the practice of polygamy and nikah halala in the Muslim community. In May 2021, he filed a PIL for a two child policy. He sought the introduction of population control law and also made MOHFW a party to this PIL.

Challenging the RTE act, Upadhyay also filed petition demanding a common curriculum for madarssas and vedic schools. In 2019, he filed a petition for the protection of non-naga ethnicities in the commercial town of Dimapur following the ILP system. In July 2022, Upadhyay filed a PIL through his son for implementation of common dress code across the schools in the country.

=== Social ===
Upadhyay has challenged certain sections 2,3 and 4 of the Places of Worship Act 1991. In February 2022, following the suicide of a school girl in Tamil Nadu alleging pressure to convert to Christianity, Upadhyay filed a PIL to regulate deceptive religious conversions. In March 2022, Upadhyay made a plea in the Supreme Court for identifying minorities at state level. This meant the Hindu community would be eligible for minority status in at least 10 states of India. In April 2022, Upadhyaya filed a plea in Delhi HC challenging the constitutional validity of the Wakf Board.

== Politics ==
Upadhyay, an active member of the Anna Hazare anti-corruption movement, was one of the founder members of the newly launched Aam Aadmi party in November 2012 following the Janlokpal movement. In March 2014, he sent a list of questions to party chief Arvind Kejriwal seeking clarity on several issues of concern including ticket distribution and funding from Ford foundation. In April 2014, he accused Kejriwal of diverting from the 'real issues' and forming a secret alliance with the Congress party while positing to be rival to them publicly. Upadhyay also claimed people close to Ford foundation were given election tickets. He even went on to accuse Kejriwal of being a CIA agent. AAP denied the allegations and expelled Upadhyay over involvement in anti party activities.

Subsequently, in November 2014, he joined the BJP along with several other AAP members. Upadhyay cited the influence of PM Narendra Modi and his vision for the nation as the reason for joining the BJP.

In 2016, he wrote a letter to Delhi CM to ban the sale of alcohol in the state.

Upadhyay has been actively pursuing the cause of population control legislation for which he has met several BJP and RSS leaders explaining that no constitutional amendment was required for introducing the population control bill.

In August 2021, Upadhyay was arrested for his role in the anti-Muslim slogans at a Jantar Mantar protest in favor of a consistent legal code he organized, where the crowd shouted slogans in favor of violence against Muslims. He denied any connection to the slogans, and was released on bail the next day, with the court citing insufficient evidence against him and his lack of flight risk.

== Personal life ==
He is married to Neeta Upadhyay and together they have two sons.
