= Śālā =

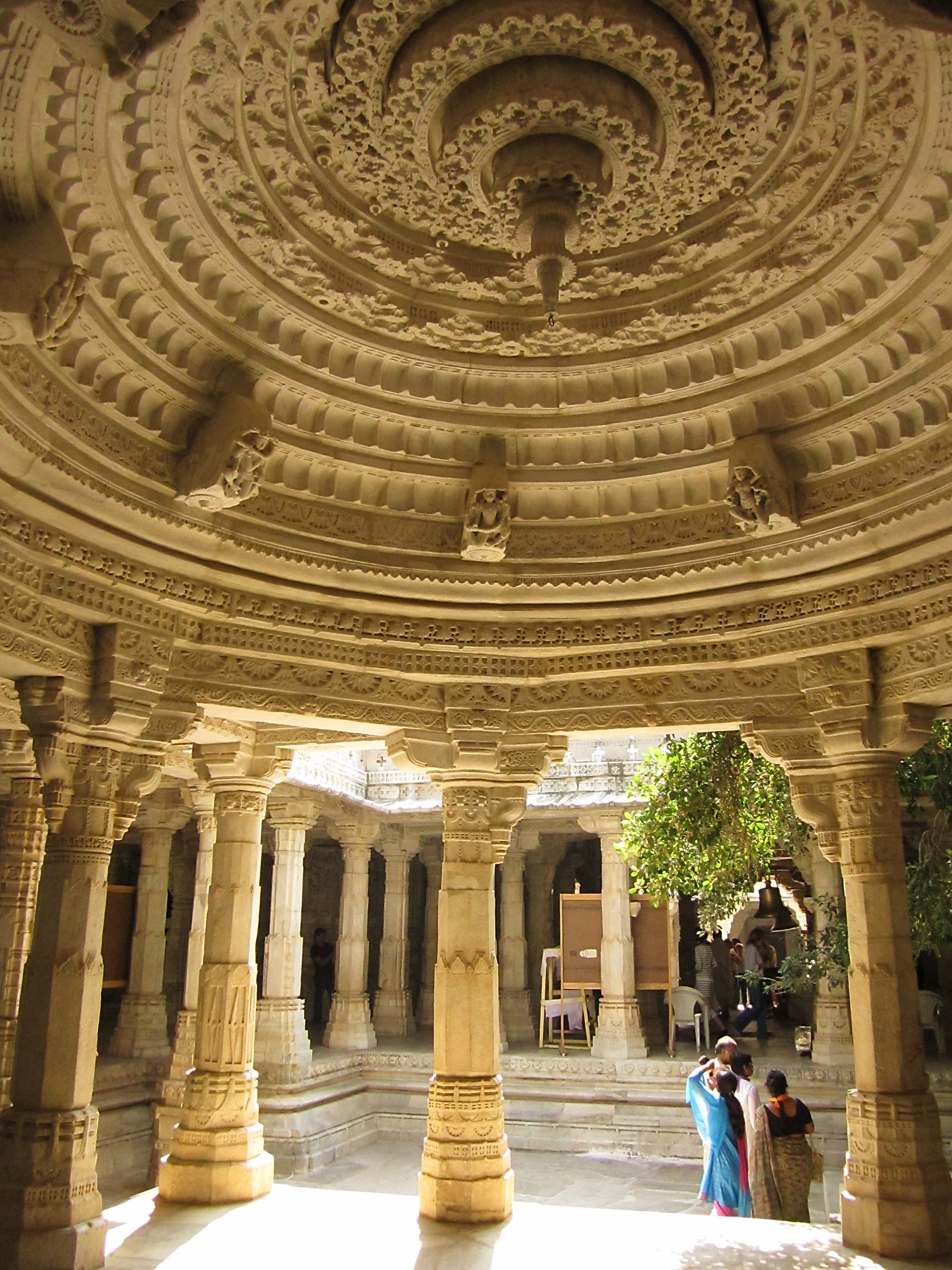
A covered pavilion (mandapa) is a type of Śālā in Indian architecture, and the term Sala also means pavilion in Vedic architecture found in Thailand and southeast Asia. Above: A mandapa for visitors in front of Ranakpur Jain Temple, Rajasthan.

A śālā (Shala) is a Sanskrit term that means any "house, space, covered pavilion or enclosure" in Indian architecture. In other contexts śālā – also spelled calai or salai in South India – means Vedic Gurukulas or a college of higher studies and supported by local population and wealthy patrons. In the early Buddhist literature of India, śālā means a "hut, cell, hall, pavilion or shed" as in Vedic śālā (pavilion for Vedic recitation), Aggiśālā (hall with a fire), Paniyaśālā (water room).

== Etymology ==
The word śālā (Skt: शाला) appears extensively in the Vedic literature, such as verse 3.12.1, 5.31.5 and others of Atharva Veda, verse 1.2.3.1 of Taittirīya Brāhmaṇa, and 1.1.3 of the Mundaka Upanishad. Its proper use in classical Sanskrit is included in various verses such as 6.2.102 and 6.2.121 of the Astadhyayi of Panini.

The term śālā appears in early Buddhist texts in the sense of "house", "room" or "hall". For example, the Samyutta Nikaya in section 4.210–214 (36) states that the Buddha sermon began in a gilana-sālā, which means "room or hall with sick people" (a nursing hall or a room where people arrive with illness) in the context of a monastery. This implies that by the time of the Buddha – c. 5th century BCE, monasteries with "halls or rooms" with medical role already existed in ancient India, and the term shala was being used in this context for the Buddha's companions to use the term to remember his sermon.

In the Shilpa Sastras such as Manasara, it refers to any house or mansion or palace, as well as hall or space formed by the walls, mandapam or shrine within a temple. It is also one of 64 types of temple architectures envisioned in Hindu texts such as the Agni Purana. Śālā or shala is also used as a prefix or suffix, similar to Pali literature of Buddhism. Thus it may appear as goshala (cow shed), pakashala (kitchen), dharmashala (resting house), danashala (hall for charitable donations). The same word also refers to the sala tree, a valuable timber tree used to construct homes and other buildings.

The term śālā appears as suffix to other words with the meaning of "house" or "room" in many texts of the 1st millennium, those authored by early Indian authors as well as by travelers to India. For example, Xuanzang – the Chinese pilgrim to India describes many "Punya-śālās" (houses of goodness, merit, charity) in his 629 CE memoir. He mentions these śālā in Takka (Punjab) and other north Indian places such as near the Deva temples of Haridwar at the mouth of river Ganges and eight Deva temples in Mulasthanapura. These, recorded Xuanzang, served the poor and the unfortunate, providing them food, clothing and medicine, also welcoming travelers and the destitute. So common were these, he wrote, that "travelers [like him] were never badly off."

== Description ==
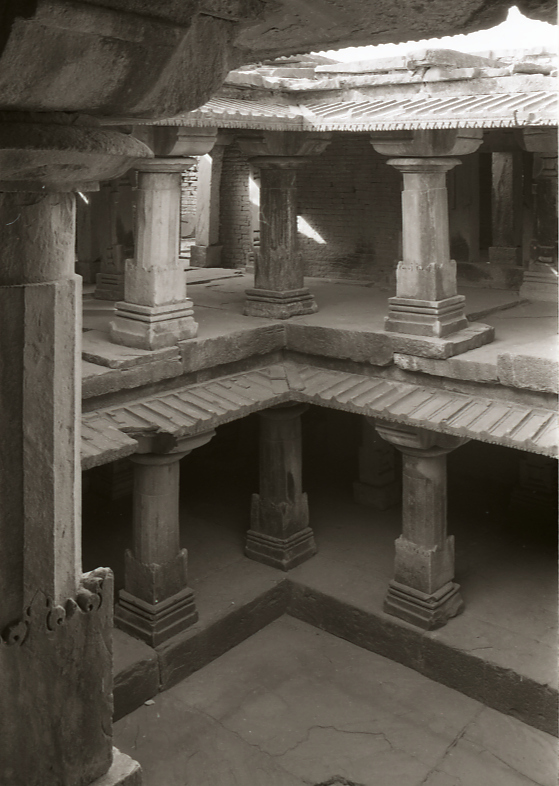
9th century monastery ruins at Kadwaha with shalas surrounding the courtyard.

The chapter 7 of the Matsya Purana describes śālá to be inspired by a tree (śāl), providing the inspiration for a house or covered space to the primitive humans. The tree roots inspired him to make a foundation, the trunk for vertical pillars, the sakha (branches with canopy) for rooms, and foliage inspired him to use thatch and leaves for roof.

Śālā evolved to additionally mean education centers. In South India, the term was spelled as salai or calai and referred to boarding colleges where students were fed and received education in the Vedas or other religious traditions, military arts and other subjects. According to Hartmut Scharfe, these schools were attached to many Hindu and Jain temples in the 1st millennium CE, and sometimes they were alternatively referred to by other terms such as a kalari (focusing on military arts) or ghatika (Vedic studies).

Many inscriptions refers to such sala or salai or calai as schools supported by wealthy donors or kings or the daily donations of devotees visiting the temple. For example, the Huzur Office Plates of south Kerala include a major inscription from 866 CE of the Ay Dynasty Hindu king Karunantadakkan who sponsored a Vishnu temple with a salai for Vedic studies for ninety five students and scholars. The donations and local villages in Parthivapuram (spelled Parthivasekharapuram in the inscription) supported the Parthasarathy temple, Parthivapuram, the boarding and feeding costs of the students (called cattar or chattra) and college staff.

The Talagunda pillar inscription dated to 455–470 CE mentions a śālá for higher education in Kanchipuram, where the founder of Kadamba dynasty (Karnataka) goes for higher Vedic studies. The Sendalai inscription and many Chola era inscriptions mention Kandalur-salai where military and weapon arts were taught, which no longer exists and is believed to probably have been in Vizhingam or Thiruvananthapuram. The Chera rulers supported the Tiruvallur salai and Muzhikulam salai in the 9th and 10th-century CE. The 11th-century Tirumukkuddal Inscription of Virarajendra – the largest known inscription in Tamil Nadu covering about 540 square feet (50 m^{2}) – is found on the inner wall of Venketesaperumal (Vishnu) temple, about 25 kilometers east of Kanchipuram. It provides details of the annual state financing and operations of a Rigvedic, Yajurvedic and Panchratra boarding salai (college) for 60 students, a hostel, a hospital (atular-salai) with 15 beds, and local community's festival celebrations all managed by the temple. (Note: The school run by Venketesaperumal temple was neither an exception nor the largest in South India. Historical records, particularly copper plate and stone inscriptions, suggest there were many. Within what is now Tamil Nadu, competing with the Tirumukkuddal salai, Hindu temples operating larger Sanskrit colleges covering the Vedas, language, and a diverse range of sastra and agama subjects existed in Ennayiram and Tribhuvani. However, these lack the kind of extensive and detailed Tirumukkuddal inscription on the school, hostel and hospital found at the Venketesaperumal temple.)

There are numerous such inscriptions about journey to or grants for schools (sala) and temples in India from the 4th-century CE onwards, states Hartmut Scharfe. These Hindu and Jain inscriptions in South India and North India (for example Rajasthan) discuss these schools with the words chatra (छात्र), cata, catta or chattirar which means a student.

The chapters 150 and 151 of the Kuvalayamala – the Jain text in Sanskrit dated to about 778 CE by Uddyotana Suri of Jalor (Rajasthan) describes a Vijayanagari with a matha (monastery) and sala attached to a temple where students from distant lands would enroll. These student, states Suri, learned painting, singing, musical arts, dancing, drama, archery, fighting with swords, debating, grammar and various subjects related to Hindu and Buddhist philosophies (Nyaya, Mimamsa, Lokayatika, Baudha).

In contemporary usage, any hall or pavilion is a śālá, such as one used for yoga practice or an event or a social gathering.

== See also ==
- Battle of Kandalur Salai
