= Nalli (surname) =

Nalli is a surname that occurs in two distinct locations:

- Lazio, Italy
- Vizianagaram district, Andhra Pradesh, India

== List of people with this surname ==
- Anthony Nalli, Canadian television producer
- Lavanya Nalli, Indian businesswoman
- Pia Nalli (1886–1964), Italian mathematician
- Reen Nalli (born 1951), American music executive
