= Li Na (disambiguation) =

Li Na (李娜, born 1982) is a former Chinese professional tennis player.

Li Na may also refer to:

- Li Na (Tang dynasty) (李纳, 758–792), general
- Li Na (daughter of Mao Zedong) (李讷, born 1940), daughter of Mao Zedong
- Li Na (singer) (李娜, born 1963), Chinese singer
- Li Na (fencer) (李娜, born 1981), Chinese fencer
- Li Na (cyclist) (李娜, born 1982), Chinese 2002 world champion in keirin track cycle racing
- Li Na (diver) (李娜, born 1984), Chinese diver who won a gold and silver medal at the 2000 Summer Olympics
- Na Li (黎娜), Chinese and American electrical engineer and applied mathematician

== See also ==
- Lee Na-eun (이나은, 李娜恩)
- Lina (disambiguation)
- Nali (disambiguation)
