= Lina gård =

Coordinates: 59.2158°N 17.6025°E

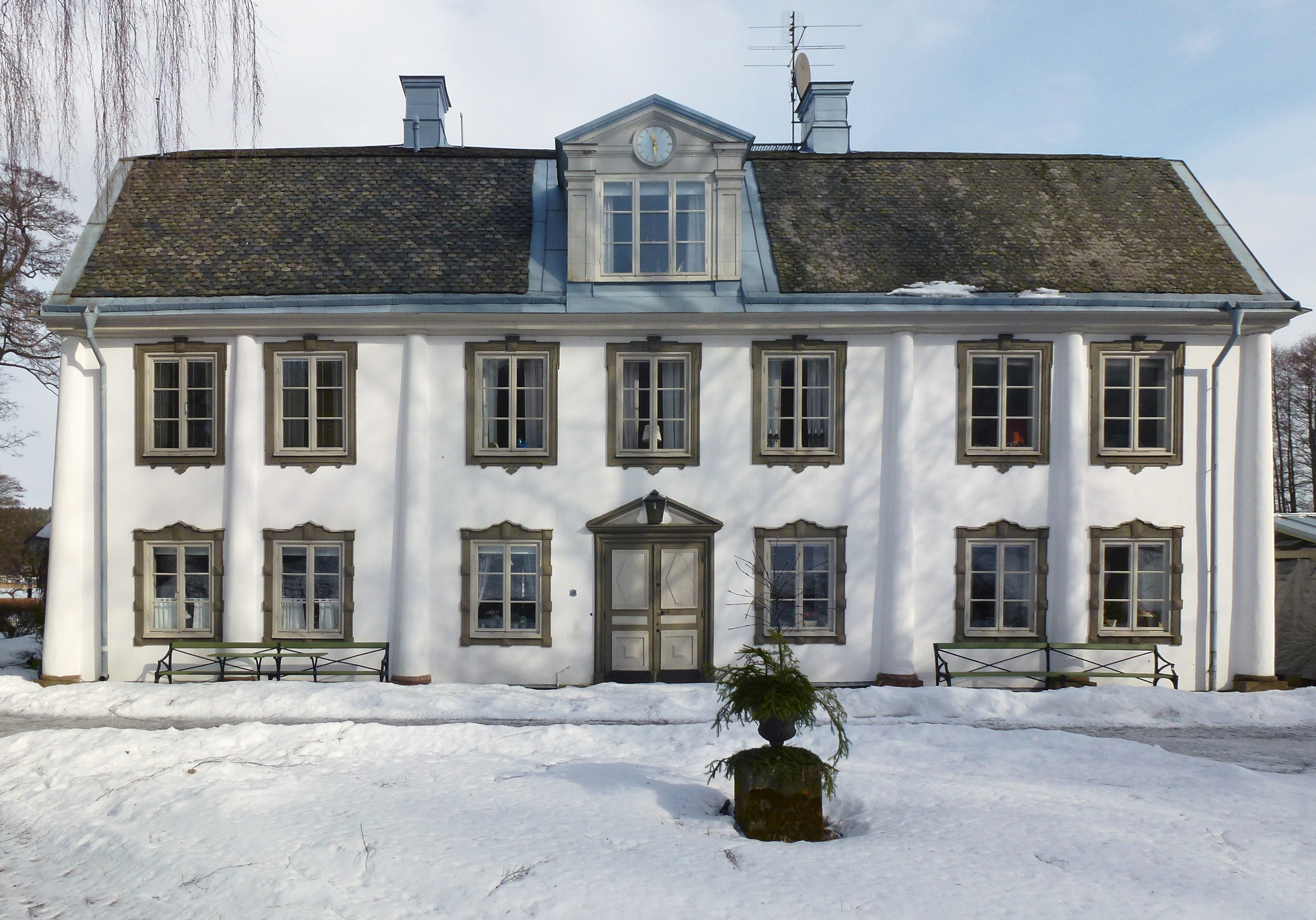
Lina gård manor house (2013)

Lina gård is an estate located at Linasundet in Södertälje, Stockholm County, Sweden.

== History ==
The property which is one of the oldest in Södermanland are referred to already in 1276 and was owned by Gustaf Lilliecrona and Johan von Engeström. Gillis Bildt (1820–1894) acquired the property in 1861. The estate remained within members of the Bildt family until 1905 when it was acquired by Kiholm Aktiebolag which operated Lina Brickworks (Lina tegelbruk). The brick works operated until 1974, when the mill was closed down. The plant was demolished in 2005.
