= Lavanda, Crimea =

Lavanda Лаванда
- Rural settlement
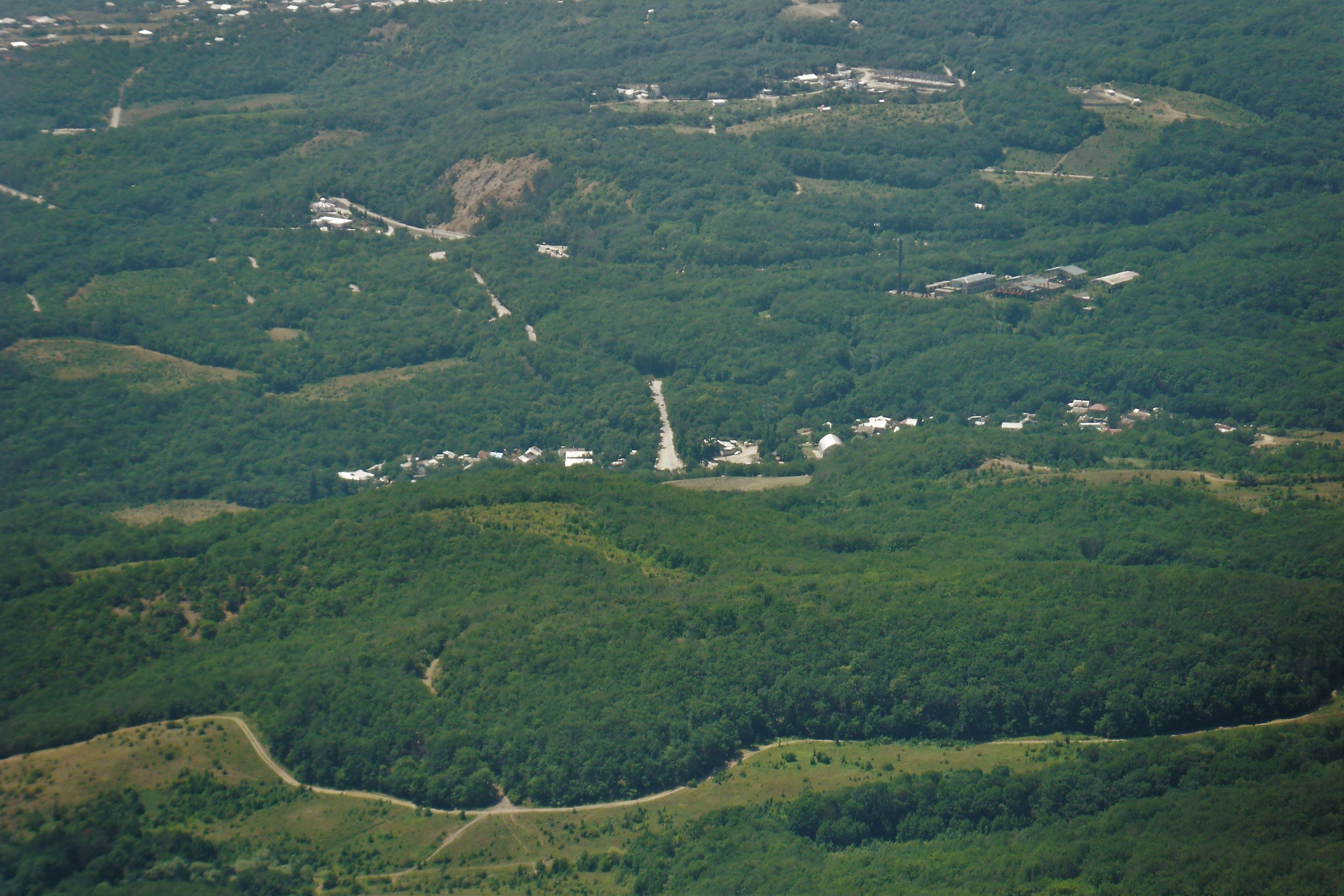
- View of Lavanda from above.
- Interactive map of Lavanda
- Location of Lavanda in Crimea
- Coordinates: 44°44′37″N 34°22′16″E
- Country: Ukraine
- Province: Autonomous Republic of Crimea
- District: Yalta Raion
- Municipality: Alushta Municipality

Area
  - Total: 1.2 km^{2} (0.46 sq mi)
- Elevation: 460 m (1,510 ft)

Population (2014)
  - Total: 206
  - Density: 170/km^{2} (440/sq mi)
- Time zone: UTC+4 (MSK)
- Postal code: 98530
- Area code: +380 6560
- Website: http://rada.gov.ua/

Lavanda (Ukrainian: Лаванда; Russian: Лаванда) is a rural settlement in the Alushta Municipality of the Autonomous Republic of Crimea, a territory recognized by a majority of countries as part of Ukraine and annexed by Russia as the Republic of Crimea. The word literally means "lavender."

Lavanda is located on Crimea's southern shore at an elevation of 460 metres (1,510 ft). It is administratively subordinate to the Luchyste Village Council. Its population was 177 in the 2001 Ukrainian census. Current population: Population: 206 (2014 Census). The M18 highway runs near the settlement.
