= Nalli (ruler) =

Ruler in ancient Tamil country

Nalli was a Velir ruler who ruled the Kandeera country and surrounding regions in ancient Tamilakam during the Sangam period. He is extolled for his benevolence, and is mentioned as one of the kadai elu vallal (last seven great patrons) in Tamil literature.

== Territory ==
Nalli was a velir ruler in ancient Tamilakam during the Sangam period. He ruled over the hill country of Kandeera (ta) and the surrounding regions in the Kongu region of the ancient Tamil country.

== Reign ==
The Sangam literature gives some details of Nalli's reign. Ettuthokai text Kurunthokai describes him as having a powerful army of chariots. Another Sangam text Purananuru narrates his victory over other Velir kings in various battles.

== Patronage ==
Nalli is mentioned as one of the kadai elu vallal (last seven great patrons) in Sangam literature such as Sirupanaatruppadai, and Purananuru. Sangam poetess Avvaiyar also lists him as one of the great patrons in one of her poems. Sirupanaatruppadai describes that he patronised many poets, and singers in his court, and usually showered them with various gifts. He has been singed upon by various Sangam poets such as Vanparanar (ta), Kakaipadiniyar (ta), and Perunthalai Sathanar (ta).

Vanparanar narrates an incident from Nalli's lifetime. When Nalli went for hunting in the forests, he came across a tired ascetic wandering in the forests. He gave the ascetic food and water, and later, on knowing about his poverty, he donated the jewels he was wearing. The ascetic had no knowledge that Nalli was the king of the country, and blessed him. Kakaipadiniyar narrates that Nalli maintained many cows in his country. In a reference to this, she describes the ghee obtained from the milk of these cows. Perunthalai Sathanar describes Nalli's benevolence and his patronage of poets while narrating an incident involving Nalli's brother Ilankandeeran.
