= Places of Worship (Special Provisions) Act, 1991 =

1991 Act of the Parliament of India

- Citation: Act No. 42 of 1991

Summary
- An Act to prohibit conversion of any place of worship and to provide for the maintenance of the religious character of any place of worship as it existed on the 15th day of August, 1947, and for matters connected therewith or incidental thereto.
- Status: In force

The Places of Worship (Special Provisions) Act, 1991 seeks to maintain and protect the religious character of places of worship in India. The full text of the code is available online through India Code: Digital Repository of Laws. It may be downloaded in the PDF format through the website of the Ministry of Home Affairs.

The Act of 1991 opens with the statement: "An Act to prohibit conversion of any place of worship and to provide for the maintenance of the religious character of any place of worship as it existed on the 15th day of August, 1947, and for matters connected therewith or incidental thereto."

== Sections ==
The act has the following sections:

- Section 1. Short title, extent and commencement.
- Section 2. Definitions.
- Section 3. Bar of conversion of places of worship.
- Section 4. Declaration as to the religious character of certain places of worship and bar of jurisdiction of courts, etc.
- Section 5. Act not to apply to Ram Janma Bhumi-Babri Masjid.
- Section 6. Punishment for contravention of section 3.
- Section 7. Act to override other enactments.
- Section 8. Repealed.

This section repeals earlier iterations of the act.

== Petitions ==
In 2019, The Supreme Court five-judge constitution bench made the following observation which weakened the act: "Historical wrongs cannot be remedied by the people taking the law into their hands."

In 2021, the Supreme Court judgment had impacts on the Places of Worship Act.

In 2022, the division bench of the Supreme Court of India, led by the Chief Justice of India D.Y. Chandrachud, accepted a petition challenging the constitutional validity of the Places of Worship (Special Provisions) Act, 1991. On November 14, 2022, a bench headed by the chief justice and Justice J. B. Pardiwala gave the Solicitor General Tushar Mehta more time to file an affidavit, as it clubbed together petitions filed by several people including former BJP MP Subramanian Swamy and advocate Ashwini Upadhyay, who had filed his plea on March 12, 2021.
