= Thalakulam =

Neighbourhood in Kanyakumari district, Tamil Nadu, India

- city
- Location in Tamil Nadu, India
- Coordinates: 8°18′30″N 77°31′59″E
- Country: India
- State: Tamil Nadu
- District: Kanniyakumari

Languages
  - Official: Tamil
- Time zone: UTC+5:30 (IST)
- Postal code: 629802

Thalakulam is a village situated on Kanniyakumari district in the Indian state of Tamil Nadu. Padmanabhapuram, Karungal, Nagercoil and Thirunainar kurichi are the nearby Cities to Thalakulam.The village is the birthplace of Velu Thampi Dalawa

== Demographics ==
Both Tamil and Malayalam speaking people are living here.

== Educational institution ==
- Bishop Agniswamy College Of Education
- Athithiya Matric H.S.S
- Govt High School Thalakulam

== Police Stations near Thalakulam ==
- Eraniel Police Station
- Mondaikadu Police Station
- Manavalakurichi Police Station
