= Nali, Iran =

Nali نالي
- Village
- Location within Iran
- Coordinates: 27°33′56″N 61°05′57″E
- Country: Iran
- Province: Sistan and Baluchestan
- County: Khash
- Bakhsh: Irandegan
- Rural District: Kahnuk

Population (2006)
  - Total: 123
- Time zone: UTC+3:30 (IRST)
  - Summer (DST): UTC+4:30 (IRDT)

Nali (Persian: نالي, also Romanized as Nālī) is a village in Kahnuk Rural District, Irandegan District, Khash County, Sistan and Baluchestan Province, Iran. At the 2006 census, its population was 123, in 26 families.
