= Parthasarathy temple, Parthivapuram =

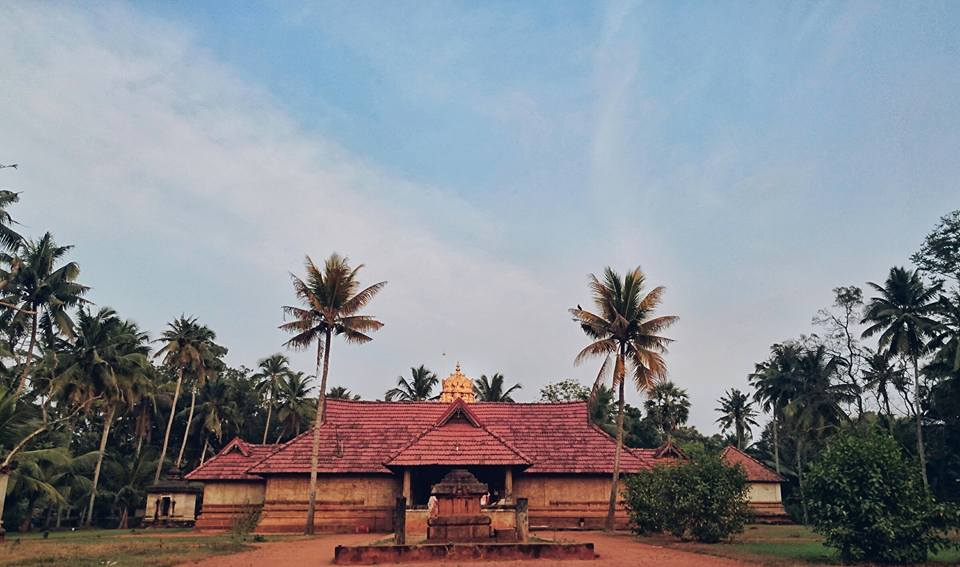

- Location in Tamil Nadu

Religion
- Affiliation: Hinduism
- District: Kanyakumari
- Deity: Vishnu

Location
- Location: Parthivapuram
- State: Tamil Nadu
- Country: India
- Coordinates: 8°16′31″N 77°10′14″E

Architecture
- Type: Tamil architecture, Square plan, Tritala Vimana
- Creator: Karunandadakkan (Ay dynasty)
- Completed: 869 CE

Parthasarathy Temple, also spelled Parthasarathi Temple, is a 9th-century Hindu temple dedicated to Vishnu in Kanyakumari district of Tamil Nadu, India. Spread over 2.5 acres, the temple is notable for the extensive records about it that have been discovered in Huzur Plates of Kollam. The inscriptions on these plates describe how the temple was built along with a salai (boarding school) for 95 students to study the Vedas and other subjects in the Taittiriya, Talavakara and Bhavishya śākhas.

The temple has a square plan from adhisthana to its sikhara for the main shrine as well as smaller shrines in the compound. The main temple illustrates a tritala vimana with a Garuda namaskara mandapa in front. Inside the main temple is a raised mukha-mandapa that connects to the garbhagriha (sanctum). Around the sanction is an open pradakshina-patha (circumambulation path), which is surrounded by walls and a raised platform with rooms. Outside is spacious courtyards and smaller shrines. The Vimana is in Chola style, while the temple layout reflects the early Kerala Hindu temple architecture.

The temple is maintained by the Archaeological Survey of India, Thrissur circle. It is a protected monument.

== Location ==
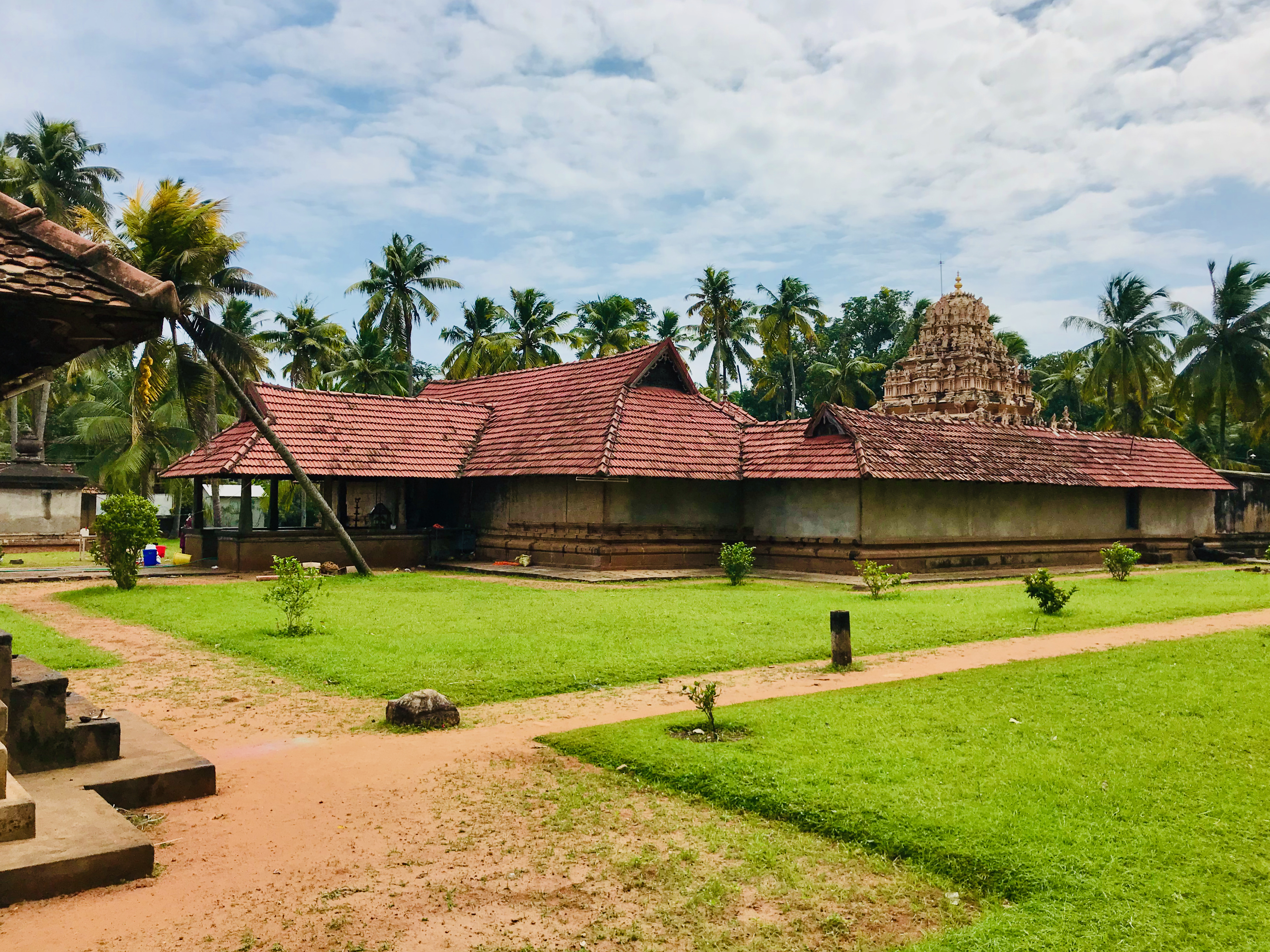
Parthasarathy Temple, Parthivapuram

The Parthasarathy temple is located in the village of Parthivapuram (Tamil Nadu), about 50 kilometers northwest of Kanyakumari, Tamil Nadu and 50 kilometers southeast of Thiruvananthapuram – the capital of Kerala. It is along Highway 179, east of the Thamiraparani river.

== History ==
The temple was built by the Ay king Karunandadakkan. His Huzur inscription, dated to 28 April 869 CE, records the construction of the temple of "Vishnu-bhattarakar" and the naming of the place as Parthiva-shekhara-puram, now shortened to Parthiva-puram. The temple site was originally called Ulakkudi-vilai, and comprised cultivated fields. It was a part of Pashungalam (present-day Painkulam or Paingulam, located south of Parthivapuram). The land originally belonged to the sabhai ("assembly") of Munchirai, and the king took it from them in exchange for land at another place.

According to the inscription, the temple was consecrated with an image of Vishnu on the Kali day 1449087, on the fifteenth day of the king's ninth regnal year. Archaeologist T.A. Gopinatha Rao (1910) calculated this date as 22 June 857 CE, but K.G. Krishnan (1989) corrected this to 869 CE.

The inscription mentions that the king also established a school (śalai) of Vedic studies at the site (see below). The school was modeled after the school at Kandalur, and had 95 students.

A 923 CE inscription found in front of the temple records gifts to the temple, by Panchavan Brahmadhiraja alias Kumaran Narayanan. The donor was probably a high-ranking office in the Pandya administration (possibly that of king Rajasimha). The first gift was that of two perpetually-burning lamps, and was maintained by Kannan Manikkan and Pagan-Chivindravan, who were in-charge of the 14 buffaloes that provided the fuel (presumably clarified butter) for the lamps. The second gift was that of paddy for feeding students. The inscription also states that the donor arranged for a capital amount to provide for the repairs to the temple: a local potter named Kaman Chengodan and other men from his extended family were required to maintain major parts of the temple out of the interest accruing from this capital.

According to Epigraphia Indica Volume 42 (1989), this 923 CE inscription is the earliest known record dated in the Kollam Era. The era was mainly used in the Kerala region, and the village was a part of Kerala before it was transferred to Tamil Nadu. Although the inscription does not mention the name of the era it is dated in, there are strong reasons for believing that it is dated in the Kollam Era. The inscription is written in Sanskrit and Tamil languages, which are inscribed in Grantha and Vatteluttu scripts.

Another 10th century inscription (dated before 940 CE) discovered at the temple, in Tamil language and Vatteluttu is dated to the reign of Para-kesari-varman Virasholap-perumangadigal, who is identified with Parantaka I alias Virachola.

== Architecture ==
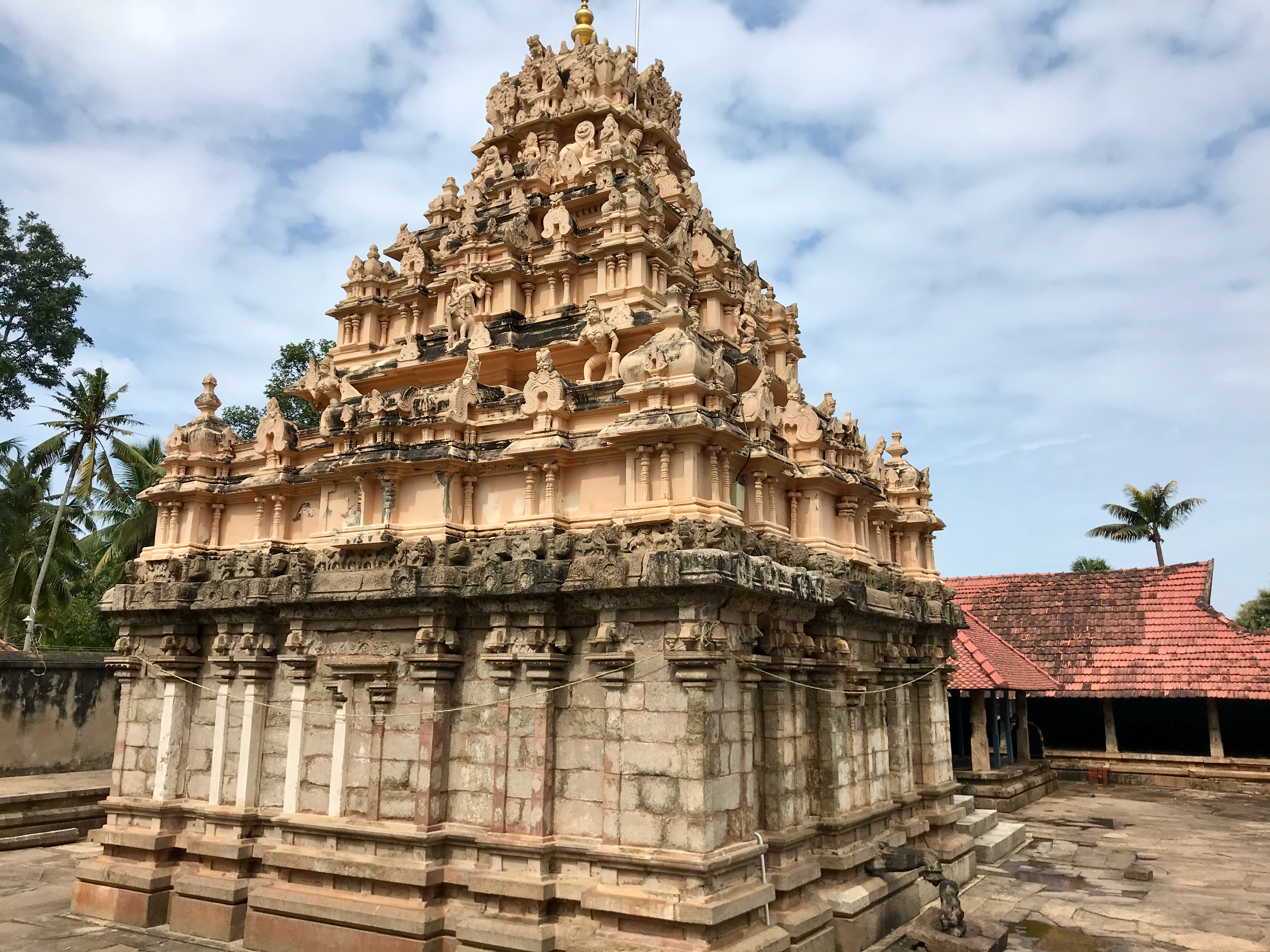
A view of the Parthasarathy Temple sanctum from the circumambulation path

The temple architecture illustrates the tritala-vimana of Hindu temple architecture. It has a square plan from adhishthana (platform) to its sikhara (top crown) with a metallic kalasha. The main temple opens to the west, while the smaller shrines outside in the compound facing the main temple open west, south and north.

The main temple is a mix of bricks and stone. All its talas (levels of the tapering spire above the sanctum) are of bricks, and they include the architectural features such kutas, panjaras and salas found in Hindu temples of South India. The second tala above the sanctum include four deities: Brahma on the north side, Indra on east, Dakshinamurti (Shaiva) on the south as is typical in Hindu temples, and Narasimha (half lion - half man avatar of Vishnu) on west. The square plan architecture of the shikhara has a nasika at each cardinal direction. The sanctum's platform is made of granite and is moulded. The temple walls is built of laterite blocks, but over time the application of lime somewhat hides it. The simha mala and the kapota is also made from granite, unusual for temples so far in southern peninsula. The walls are decorated with makara-torana ornaments.

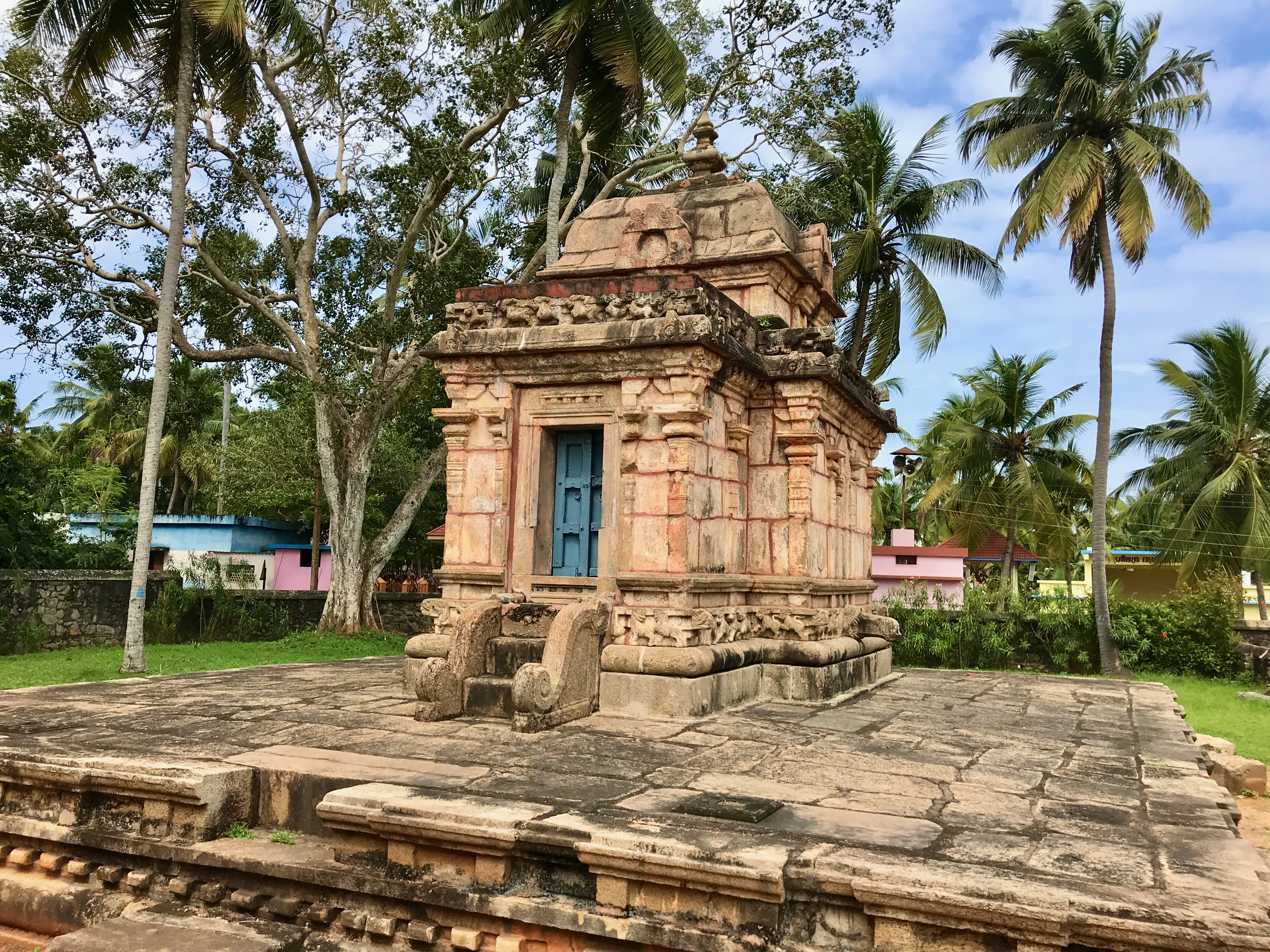
One of the six smaller shrines in the temple compound.

Beyond the square sanctum with Vishnu inside, the temple features a mukha-mandapa (main pavilion) allowing devotees to enter from three directions, a portico with a few steps, and a namaskara-mandapa with Garuda. According to Sircar, some of the elements in portico and mandapa are likely later additions in the 15th or 16th-century. These restorations or additions have preserved the original temple's classical sandhara vimana architecture, relatively common in much of Kerala.

The smaller shrines are also from the 9th-century, and they have statues in them. These are similar to most Hindu temples where all three major traditions – Vaishnava, Shaiva and Shakti – are revered together. The smaller shrines are dedicated to Krishna, Shiva, Bhagavati (Shakti), Dakshinamurti, and Shasta.

The temple compound stones and the base mouldings feature minor inscriptions, with one that mentions a "Vira Chola" – likely Virarajendra. These record a donation of silver image and of gifts to the temples by merchants and wealthy patrons.

== Vedic school ==
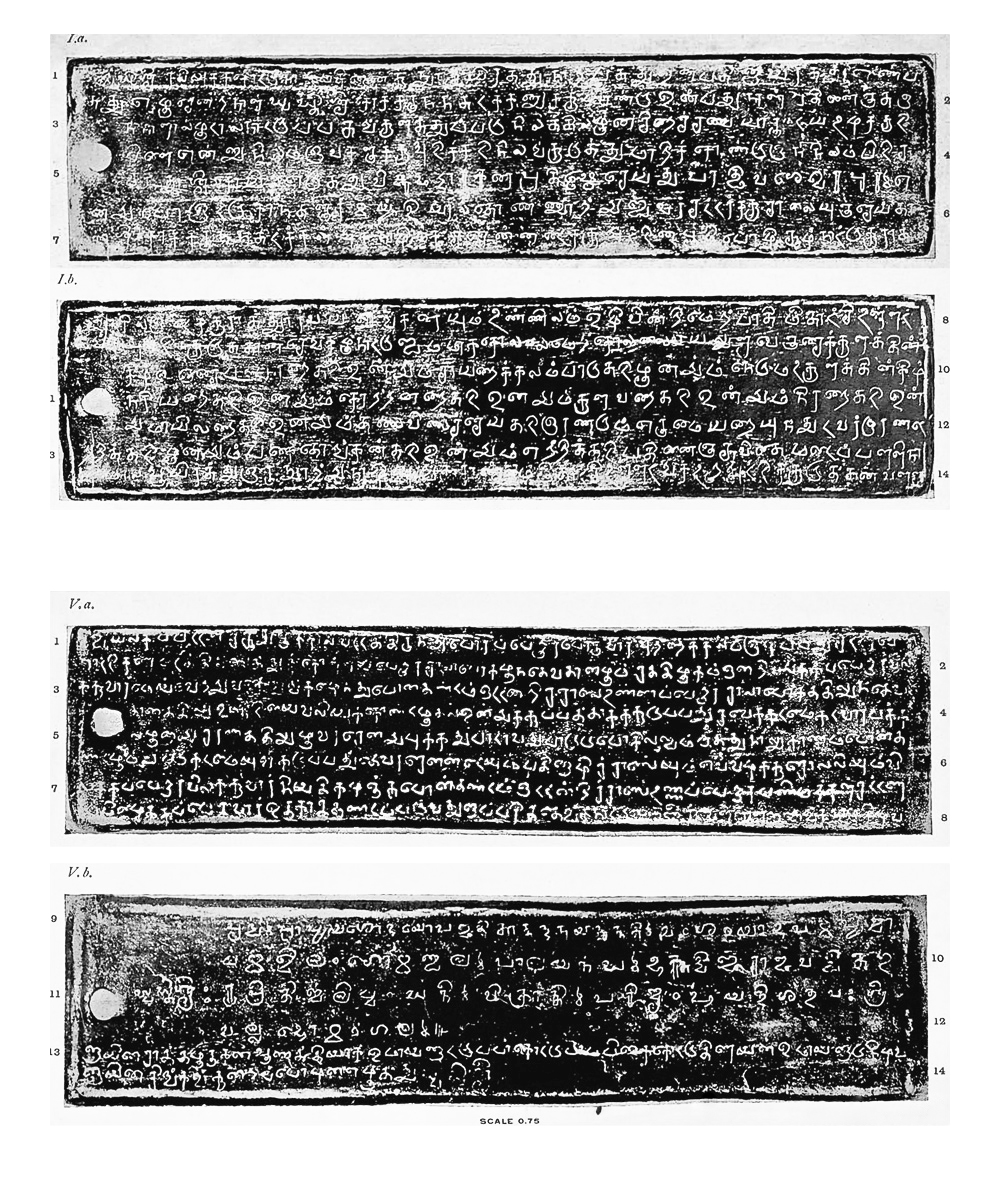
Two of five 9th-century inscription plates in Tamil and Sanskrit about the school of higher studies at Parthasarathi temple.

The Parthasarathy Temple at Parthivapuram is notable for the detailed description about the history, motivation, construction and scope of the temple in the copper plate inscriptions among the Huzur Plates of Kollam (s 42), also called the Palayam sasanam. These plates were piled in an almirah and ignored through the early 20th-century. T.A. Gopinath Rao found them, translated and understood their significance, then published them to scholarly audience.

Only 5 of the copper plates have survived, and they are inscribed on both sides. The language and script is Tamil on 9 of the 10 faces, and it is Sanskrit in Grantha script on the last face. The first plate mentions that the land was purchased or exchanged for in-kind land by the king over time for the temple and school from the farming community of Minchirai (now about 2 kilometers of the temple location). Then the temple and salai (boarding school) for 95 sattars (Skt: chatra, students) were built. According to Jayadevan, this aspect of temple and school construction as recorded by the Ay king is notable and suggests that the farming community in Travancore region of India had highly developed land rights in the 9th-century. The king respected those rights.

The king announces a land grant for the college in the first plate. The second and third plates state that the temple will maintain a sacred perpetual lamp, a garden with gardener, temple musicians, assigns temple servants to maintain the temple and school at state expense, and provides resources of annual seven day community festival in the month of Panguni ending in a chariot procession to bathe the Vishnu statue in nearby river. The fourth plate calls upon the communities in the kingdom to protect and support the temple, the school and its students.

The fourth and fifth plates provide the Vedic and related studies focus and constitution for the school:

- it will host 45 students for higher studies in Paviliya-Bahv-rc (Bhavisya) sakha studies (Note: This is one of the Rigveda sakha.)
- it will host 36 students for higher studies in Taittiriya sakha studies (Note: This is one of the Yajurveda sakha.)
- it will host 14 students for higher studies in Talavakara sakha studies (Note: This is one of the Samaveda sakha, the Jaiminiyas.)
- the hostel and school expenses will be paid in part from the taxes collected from the following villages: Omayanadu, Singulunadu, Mudalanadu, Padaippanadu and Valluvanad
- it states that no visitor, no staff and no student will interfere in the daily operations of the temple and school
- it lists the rules of conduct for temple and school servants and teachers
- it lists the rules for selection and admission for students, and their behavior while at school; for example, it states that five senior students or teachers must test the candidate's ability to recite fluent Sanskrit and examples of Vedic passages; the students should not possess or carry weapons inside the school; the students should not keep female companions or concubines inside the school; minor infractions by the student would lead to fines and loss of meals in the school

The temple illustrates and follows the guidelines given in the Hindu text Karanagamma. It states that temples dedicated to worship of deities should serve many more social purposes, such as including and managing schools. These include the teaching elementary studies and alphabet, to higher studies for chatra such as the various Vedic philosophies. This was not the only temple with such a school, states T.A. Gopinath Rao – a Sanskrit scholar known for his many books on Hindu iconography and temples. Rao states that inscriptions evidence points to similar schools in 9th-century Kanyakumari, called Srivallabhapperunjalai, another in the temple at Tiruvorriyur. In other parts of Tamil Nadu, the Tirumukkuddal Inscription of Virarajendra in Venketesaperumal (Vishnu) temple provides very detailed inscription about a Vishnu temple whose Jananatha mandapa operated and managed a Vedic school for 95 students, a 15-bed hospital and a hostel. These schools were supported by a combination of state financing, wealthy donors and the daily food and others donations of the Vishnu devotees.

== Preservation ==
The Parthasarathy temple, Parthivapuram is an ASI protected heritage monument and is managed by the Thrissur circle, Kerala.

== Gallery ==
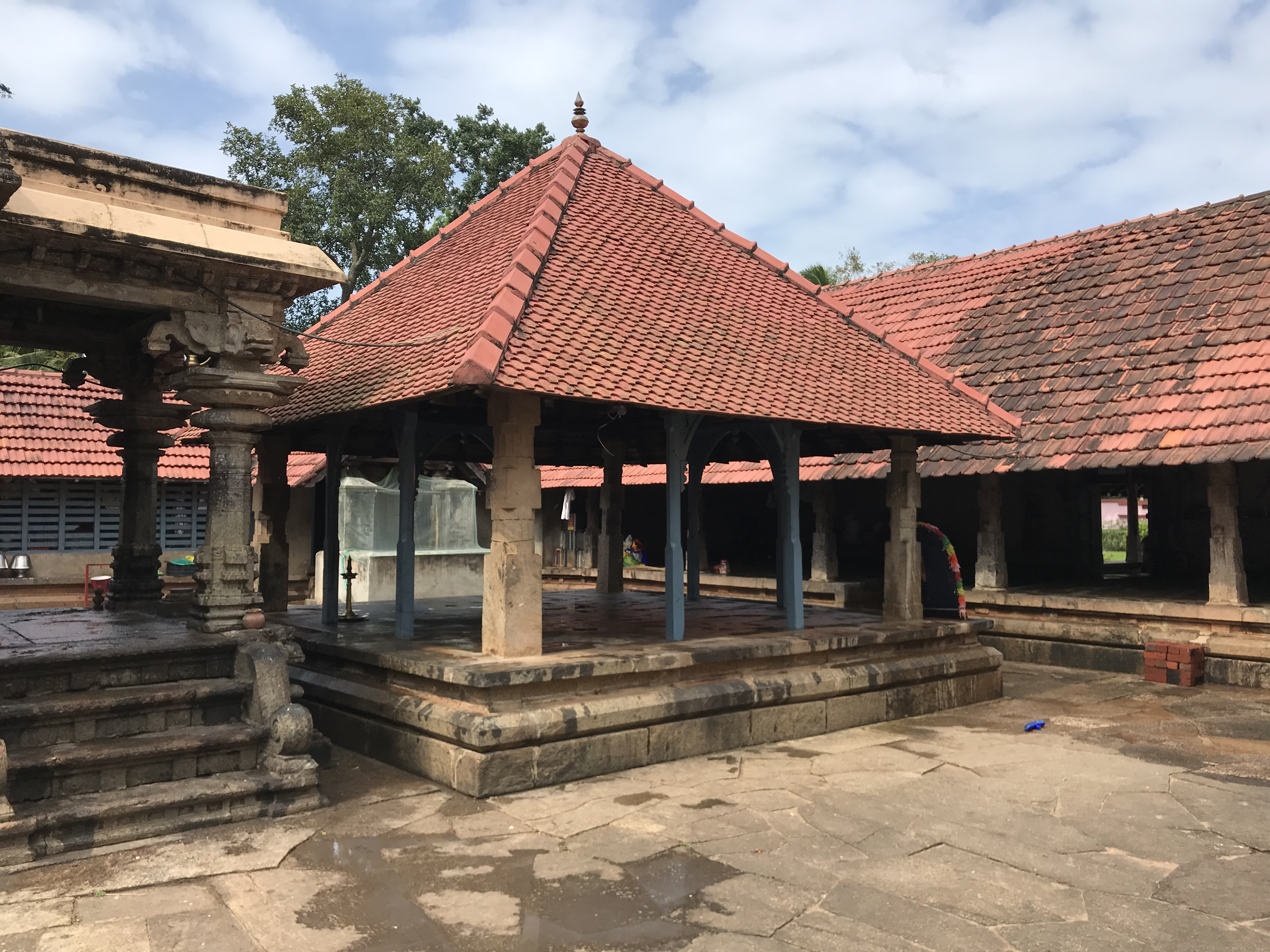
A mandapa in the main temple

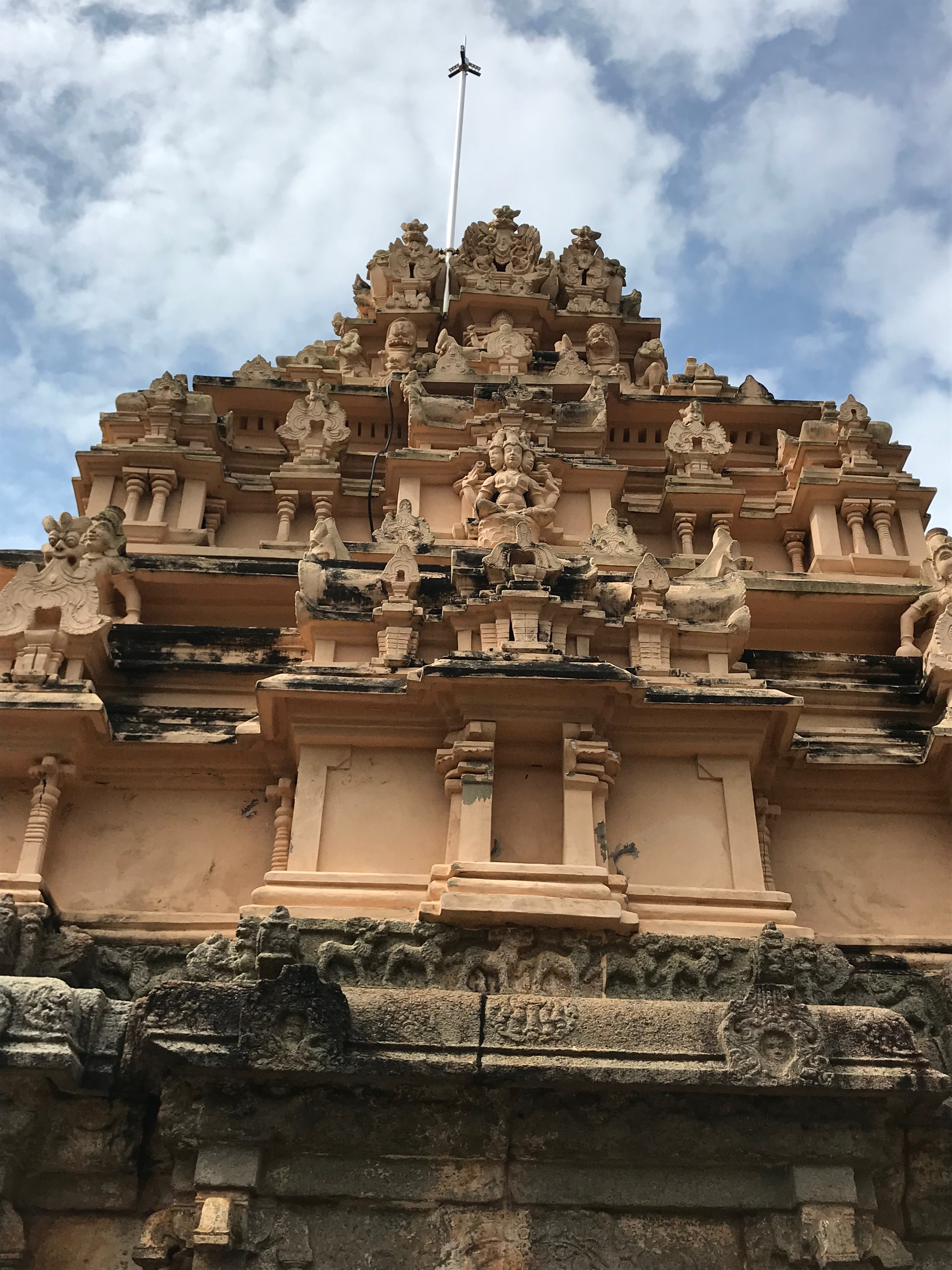
Brahma on the second tala of Vimana
