= POI v Lina =

POI v The Person Known as "Lina"
- Court: High Court (Queen's Bench)
- Full case name: POI v The Person Known as "Lina"
- Decided: 13 January 2011
- Citation: [2011] EWHC 25 (QB)

Court membership
- Judge sitting: Tugendhat J

POI v The Person Known as "Lina" ([2011] EWHC 25(QB)) was a 2011 privacy case in which an injunction was granted restraining the publication of photographs. The case also involved blackmail and because of this the claimant was granted anonymity.

== See also ==
- DFT v TFD
