= Lavanya Nalli =

Indian businesswoman

Lavanya Nalli is an Indian businesswoman. She is vice-chairman of her family's business, the Nalli Group of Companies, which manufactures saris.

== Education ==
Nalli has an engineering degree in computer science at Anna University in Chennai She is a graduate from Harvard Business School.

== Career ==
After graduation, Nalli moved to Chicago and took a job with McKinsey & Company from 2011 to 2013.

In 2014 Nalli returned to India and joined Myntra.com where she was vice president for revenue and shopping experience.
