= Ciṟupāṇāṟṟuppaṭai =

Ancient Tamil poem

Ciṟupāṇāṟṟuppaṭai (Tamil: சிறுபாணாற்றுப்படை, lit. "guide for bards with the small lute") is an ancient Tamil poem, likely the last composed in the Pattuppattu anthology of the Sangam literature. It contains 296 lines in the akaval meter. (Note: According to other scholars such as Chelliah, the poem has 352 lines.) It is one of five arruppatai genre poems and was a guide to other bards seeking a patron for their art. The main hero honored in the poem is Nalliyakkotan, but the poem reverentially mentions an additional seven minor chieftains and three kings. The poem is dated to sometime between the late 3rd century CE and 5th century CE by Kamil Zvelebil – a Tamil literature scholar.

The Ciṟupāṇāṟṟuppaṭai poem, also referred to as Sirupanattrupadai, is named after sirupanar – a class of minstrels who sang their bards while playing a small yal (yazh, lute). The poem's subject is a band of bards and their womenfolk who meet the author, and he guides them in the form of this poem. The guidance mentions a series of cities and villages the troupe must pass through on their journey to the Nalliyakkotan's palace. In this list are included Maturai – the capital of Pandyas, Uranthai – the capital of Cholas, and Vanci – the capital of Cheras. Other coastal and inland towns are also mentioned, including Eyilpattinam and Velur.

== Content ==
The relatively short poem is a condensed guide and source of information about society and culture of several ancient kingdoms and different rulers. The poem's vivid description of a bard's poverty before he found a patron is "rather powerful", states Zvelebil:

In the ruined kitchen lay the barking bitch
That whelped of late with bent cared brood too young
To open their eyes, that suck not the milkless teats
Upon the earth piled up by ants that swarm
On the walls, on which the roof had fallen down,
Sprout mushrooms hollow. There that day the wife
Of the drummer with a lean and slender waist
And bangled wrists whom cruel hunger gnawed
Did saltless cook the herb her sharp nails plucked
From refuse heaps, and made a meal of it
With poor relations, having closed the door
Ashamed to be so seen by prying folk
Such poverty was then by him removed

— Cirupanarruppatai 175–187, Translator: JV Cheliah

Similarly striking is the poet's detailed painting of a woman's body with words in lines 14–40, with antati phrases some of which are also found in earlier Sangam poems.

This poem uses "the sun being orbited by planets" as an analogy in the lines below displaying the heliocentric understanding of the planetary system by Tamil people circa. 3rd century CE.

Figuring what you like, he will
serve you unlimited quantities
of desired foods with hospitality,
in golden bowls that shine in a
way that disrespects the blazing,
tender-rayed sun surrounded by
planets, in the shining, bright sky.

— Cirupanarruppatai 242–245, Translator: Vaidehi Herbert

The poem mentions a treatise on food named after Bhima, one of the Pandava brothers in the epic Mahabharata. The description that follows includes both vegetarian and non-vegetarian food. Brahmin villages are mentioned, as is the worship of Murugan. The Sirupanattrupadai deploys a garland of similes, a Tamil poetic technique called malaiyuvamai. The poem is an important guide to ancient music traditions among Tamil people, states Venkata Subramanyam.

== See also ==
- Eighteen Greater Texts
- Sangam literature
