= Thanjavur student suicide case =

2022 suicide

Lavanya Muruganantham
- Died: 19 January 2022 (aged 17); Thanjavur, Tamil Nadu, India
- Cause of death: Suicide by poisoning
- Occupation: Student

In January 2022, 17-year-old student Lavanya Muruganantham committed suicide in the Thanjavur district of Tamil Nadu, India. Her parents alleged that the student was forced to do work by the warden, after she allegedly refused to convert to Christianity. The investigation was transferred by the Madras High court to the Central Bureau of Investigation, due to lapses on the part of the state police in conducting the investigation.

== Incident ==
Lavanya Muruganantham was a 17-year-old student of Sacred Heart Girls Higher Secondary School, a recognized minority school administered by Franciscan Missionaries of Mary in Thanjavur district of Tamil Nadu.

On 9 January 2022, Lavanya consumed pesticide in an attempt to kill herself. After she was taken to a hospital, she regained consciousness. She died on 19 January 2022.

== Investigation ==
After Lavanya's death the hostel warden was arrested by the police under the Juvenile Justice (Care and Protection of Children) Act, 2015, on charges of abatement to suicide. Police have interrogated 50 people connected to Lavanya.

The school have denied any wrongdoing in the case. The girl's parents alleged that they had not seriously considered their complaints of their daughter being pressured to convert.

Senior police officer in Thanjavur, Ravali Priya Gandhapuneni, said that the police had recorded Lavanya's complaint, statement and dying declaration in front of the Judicial Magistrate. Lavanya did not speak about religious conversion while recording her statements. The parents of the girl also did not allege religious conversion. She noted that the police had also started investigation on the allegations of conversion.

Police were also searching for the person who filmed the video shared on social media to verify the authenticity of the shared video and the motives of the person in releasing the video. According to the police officer, revealing the identity of a minor girl is a violation of law.

=== Tamil Nadu Child Rights Watch ===
Tamil Nadu Child Rights Watch (TNCRW) along with Right to Education Forum – Tamil Nadu, Campaign Against Child Labour – Tamil Nadu and Shout for Freedom had set up a fact finding team headed by an Advocate. The team was to submit its report after meeting Lavanya's family members, Department of School Education officials, school authorities, classmates and the representatives of local government. The team reported that the alleged religious conversion angle in the death was 'fabricated and being politicised'.

TNCRW's team found that the alleged religious conversion angle in the death was 'fabricated and being politicised'. The fact finding team had inquired with the public and the village panchayat members about the claims of religious conversion. They found that the management did not use words related to religious conversion. The team believed that the environment at home and hostel to have caused Lavanya's suicide. The report also noted that the school management and hostel management did not address the psychological issues faced by the student, nor did they try to solve it by discussing the issues with her parents.

== Court proceedings ==
The parents of the girl approached the Madras High Court on 21 January asking for a CBI investigation. On 31 January, upholding the plea from Lavanya's parents the Madras High Court ordered the case to be transferred to the Central Bureau of Investigation for further investigation.

On 14 February 2022, the Supreme Court hearing the plea of Tamil Nadu government challenging the Madras High Court judgement, refused to intervene with the High court judgement.

== Politics ==
South China Morning Post reported that the far-right Hindu groups in the region often accused the health care and educational institutions run by the Christian organisations of proselytising.

The opposition NDA alliance partner, Bharatiya Janata Party (BJP) announced that it will set up a committee for investigating the allegations of coerced conversion. K. Annamalai, the president of Tamil Nadu wing of BJP was leading the political campaign that focused on the death of the girl. Annamalai had shared Lavanya's video on his Twitter profile.

Chief Minister of Tamil Nadu M. K. Stalin accused the BJP of doing communal politics over the incident.

On 28 January, a group of the villagers from different religions of Michaelpatti village submitted petitions to Thanjavur Collector alleging that "vested interests" were attempting to disrupt the religious harmony of their village using the incident of Lavanya's death. Their village of 800 families following Christianity, Hinduism and Islam lived amicably since five generations. So far no one had attempted to convert the villagers into another religion, neither in the village nor in the school. They demanded that independent committees created by the political parties and religious organizations be prevented from conducting investigations in their village. The girl's father too petitioned the Collector, seeking action against school authorities for "forcing his daughter to end her life."

The parent-teachers association president, residents, parents of students and alumni of the school, where Lavanya studied, submitted their separate petition to the Collector, seeking protection for the School. They stated that since the death, some political parties and religious outfits were carrying out a "smear campaign" against the school and teachers. In their petition, action against these parties and outfits was sought.

Members of the minority groups in Karur lodged a legal complaint against the state BJP president K. Annamalai at Thanthonimalai police station accusing him of making attempts to disturb the religious harmony. The Police did not immediately, file an FIR on the complaint.

The accused hostel keeper was released on bail on 13 February 2022. She was greeted by DMK's Trichy East Assembly member Inigo S. Irudayaraj, and presented with a shawl and garland. Iruthayaraj stated that she had worked in the rural areas for the education of poor children. He added, "Justice will prevail. We will continue to work for religious harmony."

== Unverified video ==
After her death, an unverified video was shared in the social media captured by Vishwa Hindu Parishad's Ariyalur District Secretary, in which Lavanya is seen alleging that she was forced into chores related to cleaning, maintenance and administration of the hostel. The video suggested that Lavanya was being pressured to become Christian.

Three more videos were later leaked. The Hindu reported that the second video of Lavanya appeared to have been shot while Lavanya was undergoing treatment at the hospital. The video purportedly showed that Lavanya had attempted suicide as she was unable to concentrate in studies due to the non-academic work she had to do in the hostel. The video did not mention religious conversion. She identified herself in one video by providing personal information. In another video, she explained about the chores she was made to do in school, and in another, she talked about her stepmother.

The videos were first investigated by the police and the case heard in the Madurai bench of the Madras High court.
