= Vēl Pāri =

Ruler of Parambu nadu in ancient Tamil country

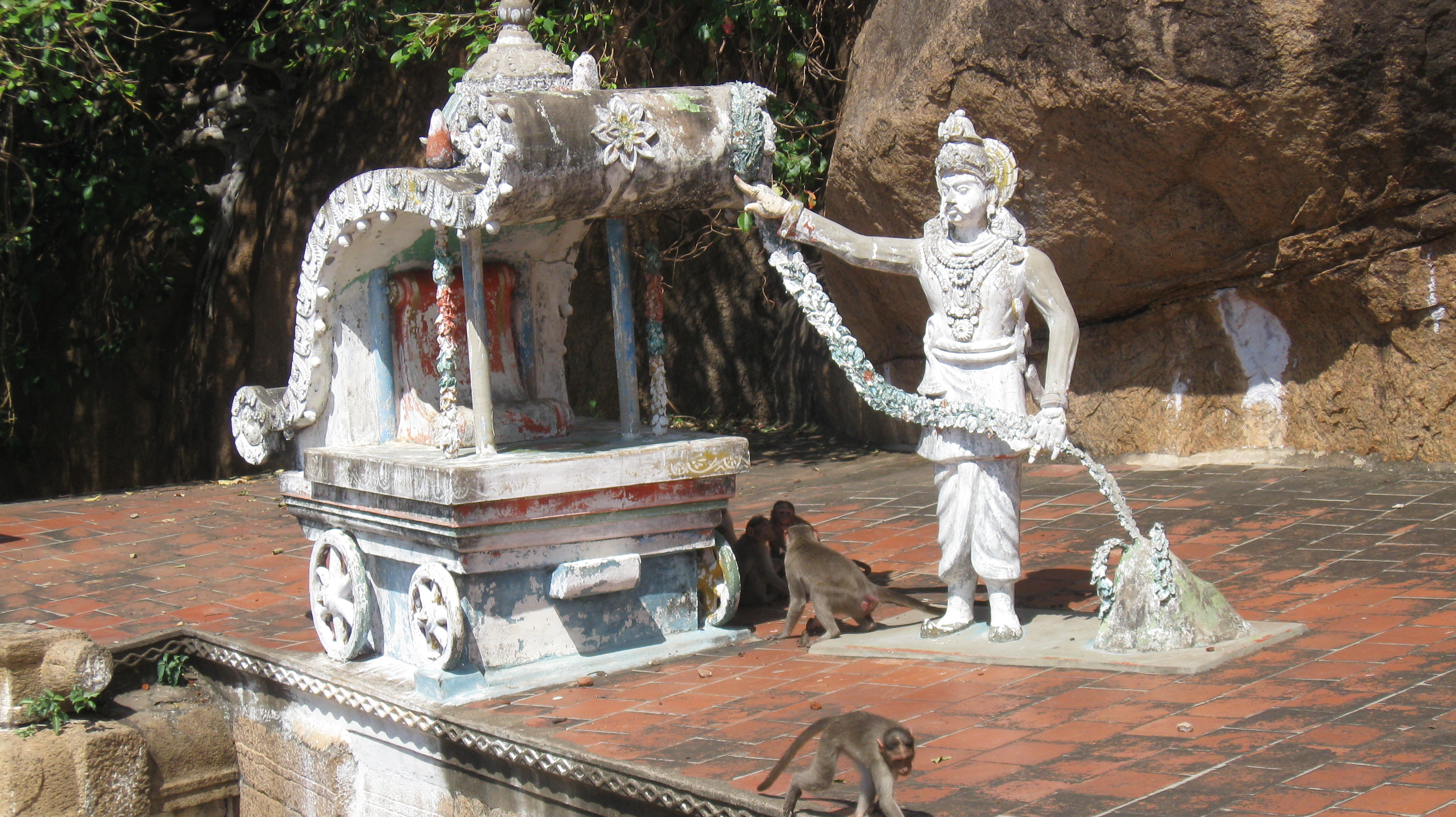
A statue of Paari giving away his chariot to a climber plant

Vēḷ Pari was a velir ruler who ruled Parambu nadu and surrounding regions in ancient Tamilakam during the Sangam period. He was the patron and friend of poet Kabilar and is extolled for his benevolence, patronage of art and literature. He is remembered as one of the kadai elu vallal (literally meaning, the last seven great patrons) in Tamil literature.

== Ascension and rule ==
Pāri is described as the master of the hill country of Parambu Nadu and held sway over 300 prosperous villages. Parambu Nadu consisted of parts of modern-day Tamil Nadu and Kerala stretching from Piranmalai in Sivaganga district in Tamil Nadu to Nedungadi in Palakkad district in Kerala. Poet Kabilar was his close friend and lifelong companion. Pari patronized various forms of art, literature and bards in his court. Kabilar states in song 107 of Purananooru:

Again and again they call out his name: "Pāri! Pāri"! Thus do poets with skilled tongues all praise one man.
Yet Pāri is not alone: there is also the rain to nourish this earth.

Pari was noted for his generosity and is described as one of the kadai ezhu vallalgal (last seven great patrons). He is described in Sangam literature as "mullaiku ther koduthaan Pari" (one who gave his chariot to a climber plant). He was so generous that he gave away his chariot to a climber plant when he saw that it was struggling to grow without a suitable support.

== Siege and death ==
The three crowned kings of Tamilakam– Cheras, Cholas and Pandyas expanded their kingdoms ruthlessly and turned their attention towards independent velir kings, turning them into subordinates or eliminating them and assimilating their kingdoms. They laid siege to the Parambu country. However, Pari was garrisoned atop the hill, and refused to give in. The war dragged for months and his people sustained on various forest produce. Kabilar approached the kings and asked them to turn back describing his patron Pari as an unconquerable warrior (excerpt from Purananooru song 109, 110 and 111):

You may think Pāri's mountain is easy to conquer. Even though the three of you with your gigantic royal drums lay siege to it..Like the sky is his mountain. Like the stars in the sky are its springs. Even though your elephants are tied to every tree, your chariots spread through every field, you will not take it by fighting. He will not surrender it by the sword. But here: I know how you can win it. If you play little lutes, their strings of rubbed twine, have your dancing women come behind with thick, fragrant hair, and go to him dancing and singing, and ask him to donate it, he will give you his mountain and his whole land.

"Even if the three of you

with your murderous armies unite,Parampu will be difficult to seize.There are three hundred villages in the cool, fine Parampu country. All the villages were gifted by him to those who asked. But if you go singing, you can win us and Pāri.

You will also get his mountain!"

"Pitiful is his huge dark mountain!It would be difficult to conquer it withspears, even by brave kings,but easier to win if a female drummergoes singing with her kohl-lined eyes,dark like blue waterlily blossoms."

—

Pari's enemies plotted against him, and planned to kill him. When Kabilar was out of the country, they took advantage of the situation. Knowing Pari's generosity towards poets, they sent some of the soldiers as poets to Pari. Pari was later killed by them through treachery. Purananooru, song (112) on the description of his death by his daughters:

That day in that white moonlight, we had our father, and no one could take the hill. This day in this white moonlight, kings with drums beating victory, have taken over our hill, and we have no father.

== Family and succession ==
Pari and his wife Aadhini had two daughters, Angavai and Sangavai. Kabilar become their guardian after Pari's death and the three of them left Parambu country. Kabilar unsuccessfully approached various velir kings to find grooms. Kabilar later killed himself by vadakirrutal, one of the Tamil ways of committing suicide. Later, poetess Avvaiyar took care of them and married them successfully to the descendants of Malaiyamaan Thirumudi Kaari. The princely Pillai-Pari family of Nungambakkam estate, who belong to the Ay and Velir linage, claim descent from Vel Pari's daughter Sangavai.

== Legacy ==
Pariyur ("place of Pāri") or Parapuri near Gobichettipalayam in Tamil Nadu is named after Pāri. After Pāri was defeated, the place was deserted towards the end of thirteenth century A.D. and people migrated to settle down in neighboring areas what became the modern day town of Gobichettipalayam. Pariyur has four temples dedicated to various Gods namely, Pariyur Kondathu Kaliamman Temple, Amarapaneeswarar Temple, Aadhinarayana Perumal Temple and Angaalamman Temple.

== In popular culture ==
- Veera Yuga Nayagan Velpari by S. Venkatesan is a fictional novel set around the life of Vel Pari.
