= Nanjagoundenpalayam =

Nanjagoundampalayam
- suburb
- Location in Tamil Nadu, India Nanjagoundampalayam (India)
- Coordinates: 11°27′13″N 77°26′18″E
- Country: India
- State: Tamil Nadu
- District: Erode

Population (2001)
  - Total: 3,000

Languages
  - Official: Tamil
- Time zone: UTC+5:30 (IST)
- PIN: 638453
- Telephone code: 04285
- Vehicle registration: TN 36

Nanjagoundampalayam or Pariyur Nanjagoundenpalayam is a suburb which forms a part of Gobichettipalayam urban agglomeration in Tamil Nadu. The majority of the village comes under the jurisdiction of Gobichettipalayam Municipality while some parts are governed by the Pariyur village panchayat. As the naming suggests, the population is dominated by the Kongu Vellalar or Gounder community. Pariyur forms a part of the boundary of Nanjagoundenpalayam where the famous Pariyur Kondathu Kaliamman temple is situated.
