= Hippalus =

Ancient Greek sailor

Hippalus is credited by the Periplus of the Erythreaen Sea as the first to discover the passage from the Red Sea to India over the Indian Ocean

Hippalus (Ancient Greek: Ἵππαλος) was a Greek navigator and merchant who probably lived in the 1st century BCE. He is sometimes conjectured to have been the captain of the Greek explorer Eudoxus of Cyzicus' ship.

== Use of monsoon ==
The writer of the 1st-century CE Periplus of the Erythraean Sea credited Hippalus with discovering the direct route from the Red Sea to Tamilakam over the Indian Ocean by plotting the scheme of the sea and the correct location of the trade ports along the Indian coast. Pliny the Elder claimed that Hippalus discovered not the route, but the monsoon wind also called Hippalus (the south-west monsoon wind). Most historians have tried to reconcile the reports by stating that knowledge of the monsoon winds was necessary to use the direct route, but the historian André Tchernia explains that Pliny's connection between the wind and the navigator was based on common pronunciation: in the Hellenistic era the name of the wind was written as Hypalus, only in Roman times the spelling Hippalus came into use. The wind had already been known in Hellenistic times and had before been used by Himyarite (Southern Arabian Semites) and Indian sailors to cross the Indian Ocean.

=== Significance ===
To understand the importance of Hippalus' discovery we have to know that before him Greek geographers thought that the Indian coast stretched from west to east. Hippalus was probably the first (in the West) to recognize the north–south direction of India's west coast. Only someone who has this insight will think crossing the Arabian Sea might be a faster way to south India than following the coastline.

The use of Hippalus' direct route greatly contributed to the prosperity of trade contacts between the Roman province of Aegyptus and India from the 1st century BCE onwards. From Red Sea ports like Berenice large ships crossed the Arabian Sea to the Malabar coast and Muziris port, Tamil kingdoms of the Pandyas, Cholas and Cheras in present-day Kerala and Tamil Nadu.

== Legacy in science and literature ==
In 1935, a crater on the Moon was named after the navigator.

Hippalus is also a prominent character in L. Sprague de Camp's 1969 novel about Eudoxus, The Golden Wind. He is also mentioned in the Tamil novel Veera Yuga Nayagan Velpari
