= Last seven great patrons =

Group of seven kings from ancient Tamilagam

Last seven great patrons (Tamil: Kadai ezhu vallal) are a group of seven kings from ancient Tamilagam mentioned in the Sangam literature. These kings were noted for their generosity and charitable deeds.

== Literature ==
There are seven kings who are mentioned as the last seven great patrons in the Pattuppattu text Sirupanaatruppadai. It is dated to sometime between the late 3rd century CE and 5th century CE, and the stanza is attributed to Nattatranar. A poem by Perumchittiranar from the Sangam literary work Purananuru also lists the seven great patrons and their deeds. Dated to between 2nd and 5th century CE, it is part of the Ettuthogai texts. Sangam poet Avvaiyar also lists them in one of her poems. There are also mentions of lists of first and middle seven great patrons in the Sangam literature.

== Patrons ==
The seven patrons mentioned in the literature are described as amongst the most generous of the kings. These kings were regional monarchs known as velir, who ruled small kingdoms under the larger triumvirate of Cheras, Cholas, and Pandyas. During the sangam period, poets and scholars generally sung praises on the rulers, who in turn bestowed them with gifts. Amongst the various patrons, these seven were described as the greatest amongst them by the poets.

In Sirupanaatruppadai, Nattatranar lists them as Pegan, Pari, Kari, Aay, Adigan, Nalli, and Ori. Avvaiyar also lists the same seven as Perumchittiranar, but in a different order. Perumchittiranar lists the seven kings as Pari, Ori, Malayan Kari, Elini, Pegan, Aay, and Nalli in Purananuru. Six of the names are common across the lists with the only name being different is Elini in Perumchittiranar and Avvaiyar's list, and Adigan in Nattatranar's list. Based on the description and timeline, both the names have been attributed to the same king from Athiyaman clan.

=== Pegan ===
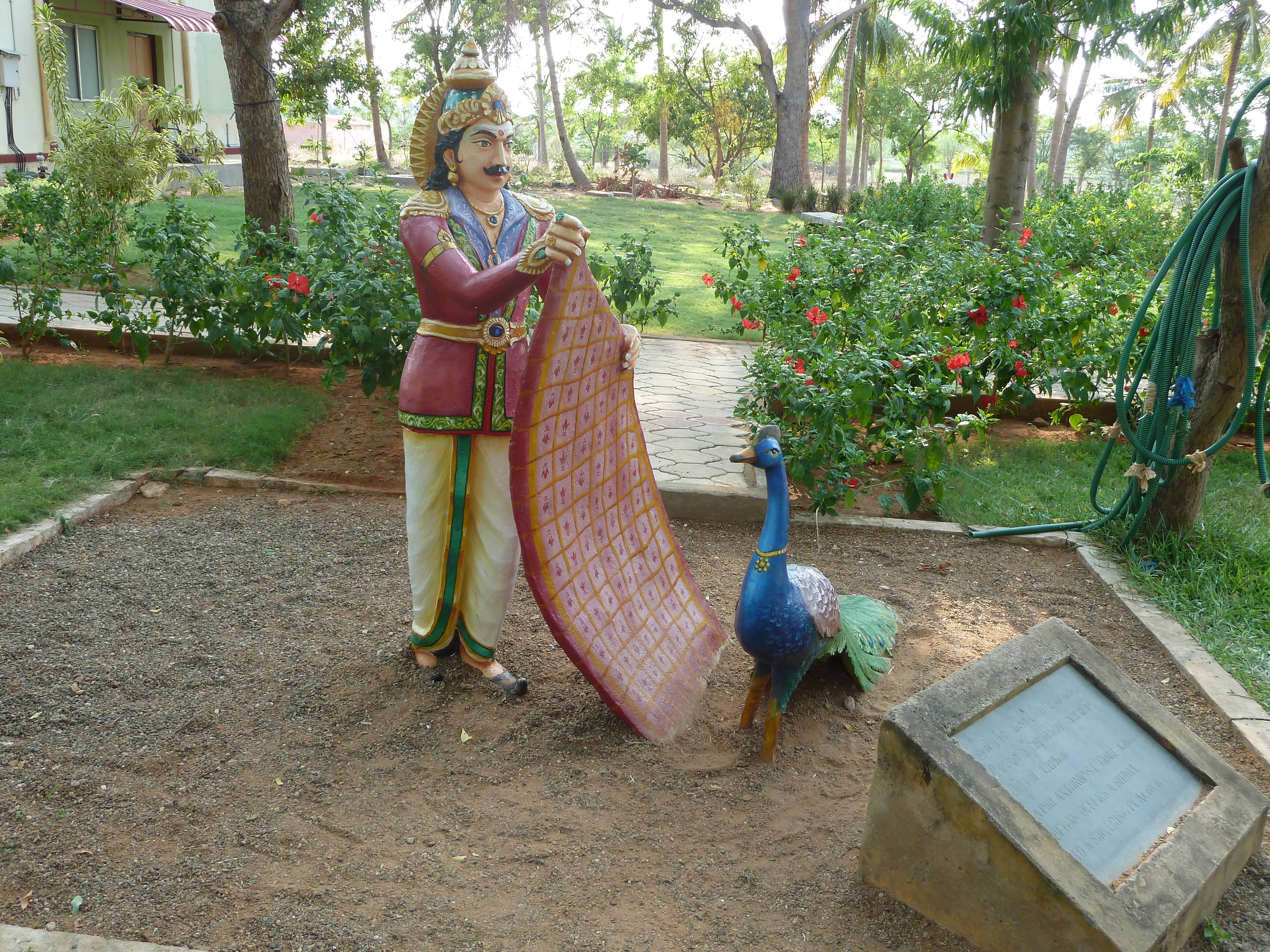
Pegan blanketing a peacock

Pegan was the lord of the aviyar clan, who ruled over the hill country of Palani Hills. He was a contemporary of Tamil poets Kabilar, and Paranar. Once Pegan saw a male peafowl displaying its elaborate tail feathers. He presumed the bird's actions to be the result of shivering because of cold weather. He took his upper garment and wrapped it as a blanked around the bird to protect it from cold.

=== Kari ===
Kari belonged to the Malayaman clan and ruled over with his capital at Thirukovilur. He had a horse, also named Kari, which helped him win multiple battles. He is described as bestowing poets with riches and gifts like rainfall including his mount. He lost to Athiyaman in battle, and defeated Ori.

=== Pari ===
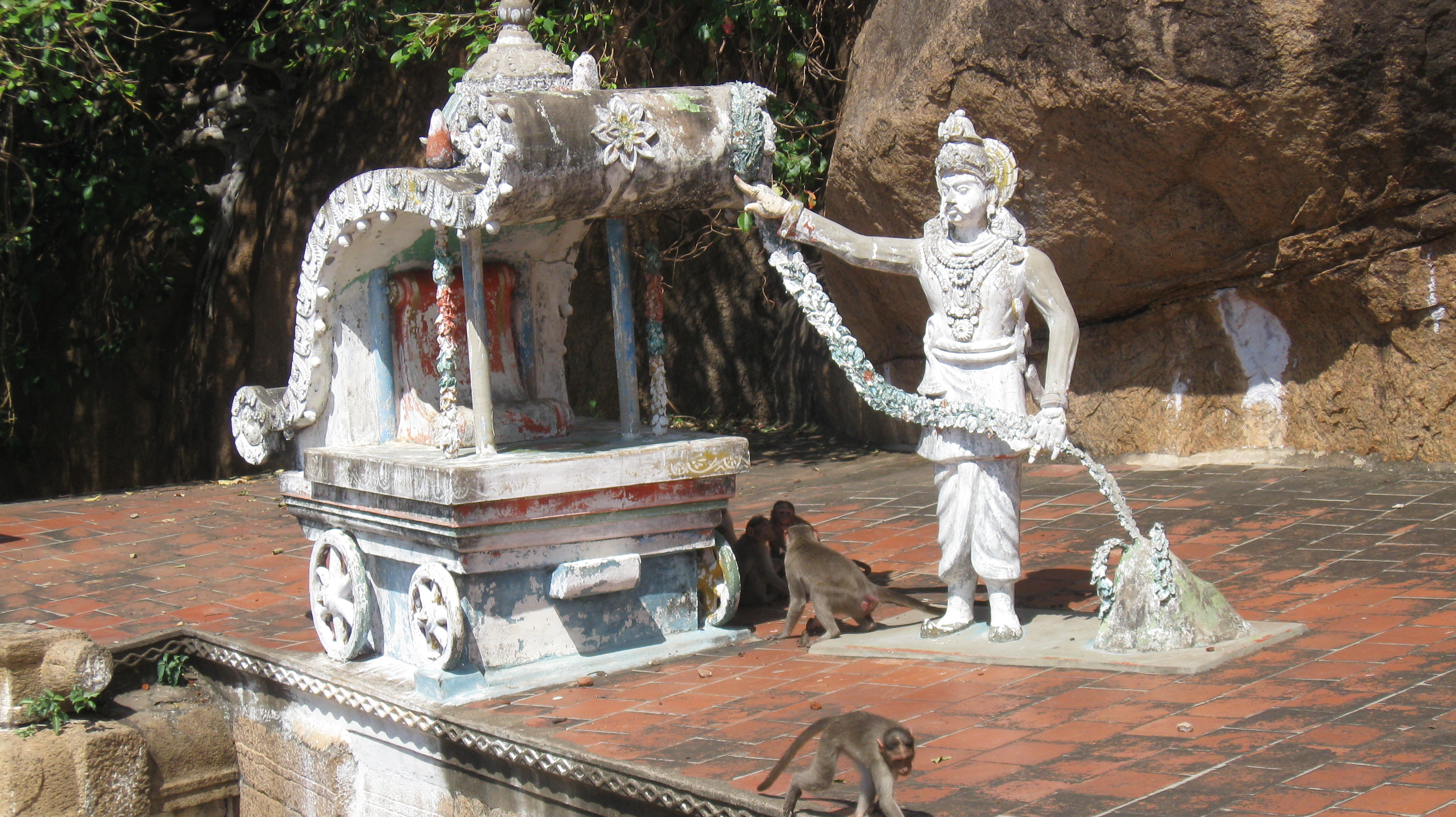
Pari giving his chariot to support a climber plant

Pari was the ruler of Parambu country, and patron of poet Kabilar. Once when Pari was traveling along country side, he noticed a jasmine vine struggling for support. He immediately disembarked from his chariot, and offered it as a support for the plant.

=== Ay Andiran ===
Ay Andiran ruled over the Pothigai hills with his capital at Aaykudi. His deeds have been sung in poems by Mosiyar. He had the habit of donating elephants to the poets and needy. An ascetic once donated Aay a divine snake skin garment, which purportedly gave prosperity and good health. However, Aay did not care for material things, and donated the garment to lord Shiva.

=== Athiyaman ===
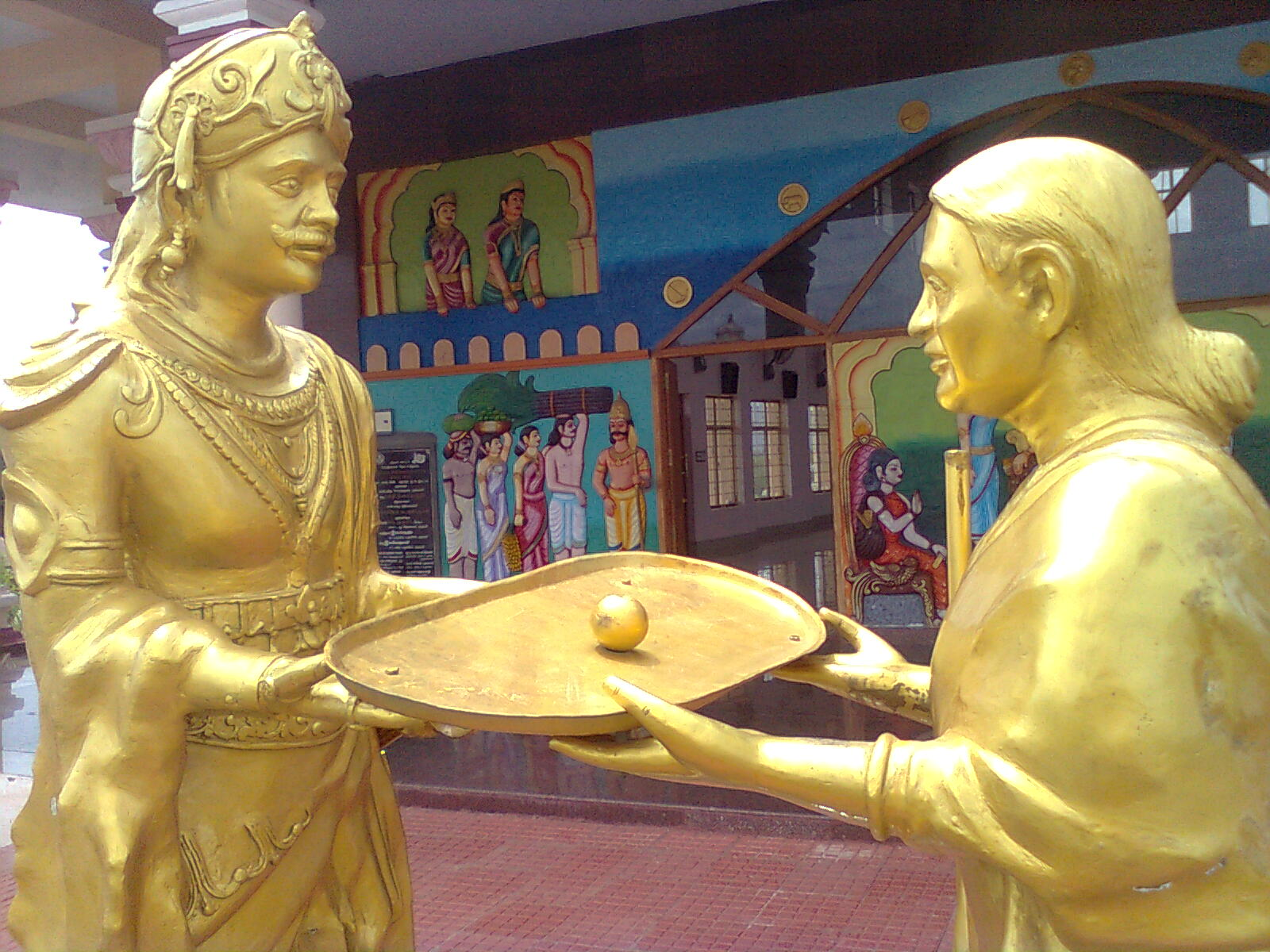
Athiyaman giving the fruit to Avvaiyar

Athiyaman was the ruler of Mazhanadu, and was the contemporary of poet Avvaiyar. There was an Indian gooseberry tree in the forests of Kanchamalai in Athiyaman's realm. The fruit of the tree was purported to have medicinal effects, and bestowed longer and healthier lifespan for those who consume it. The tree did not bear any fruit for a long time, and ultimately bore one single fruit which ripened. However, instead of consuming the fruit himself, he gave the fruit to Avvaiyar and stated that she was more befitting of the fruit due to her literary service.

=== Ori ===
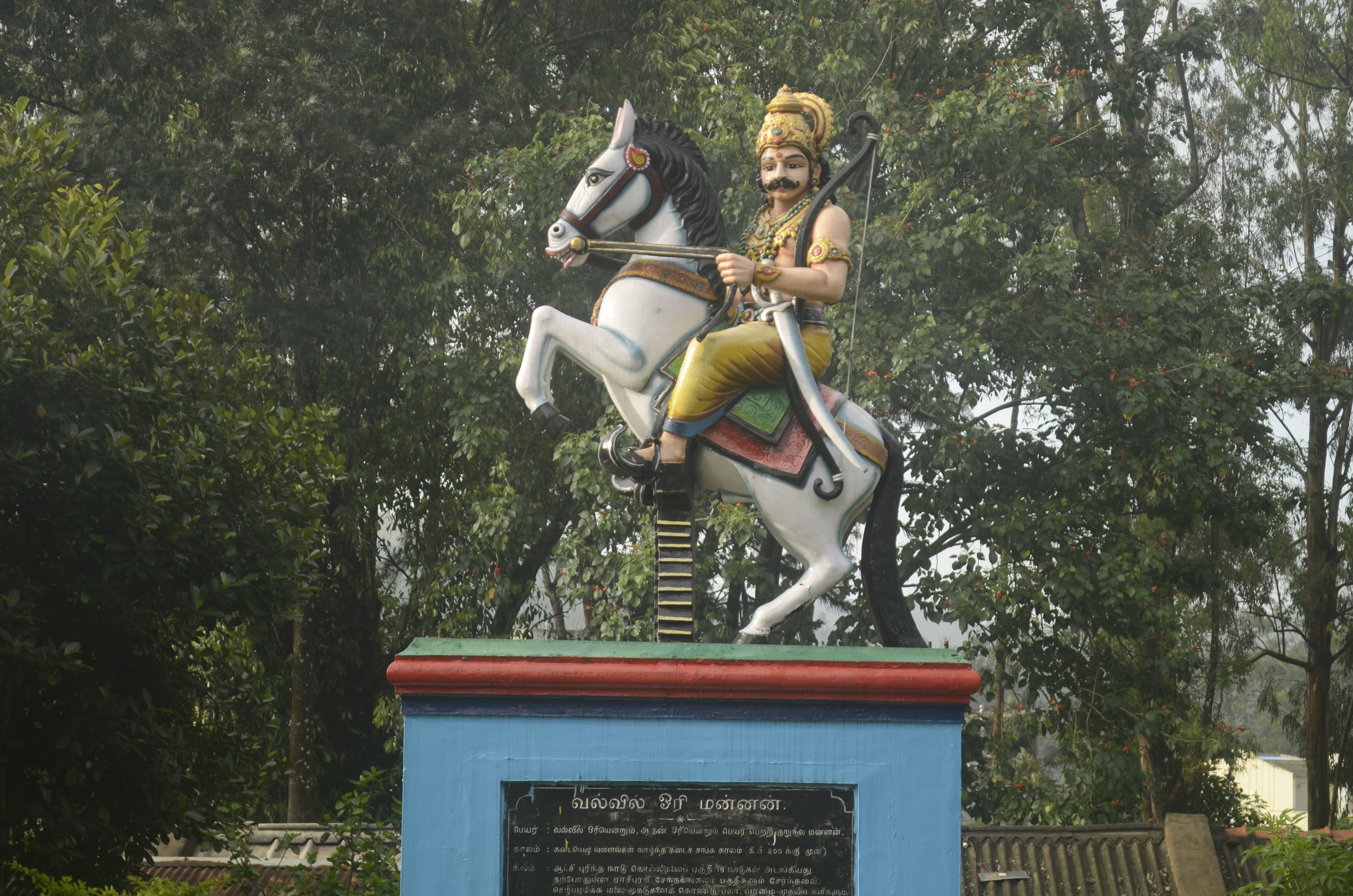
Ori on his horse

Ori was the ruler of Kolli Hills, and was known for his skill in archery. Paranar details his archery skills, and his donations to the hill people. He was also known for his generosity in granting gifts to poets, and the needy. After defeating Kari in multiple battles, he was finally killed by Kari with the help of the Cheras.

=== Nalli ===
Nalli is described as the ruler of Kandeera country. His deeds have been described by Paranar and Perunthalai Sathanar. He has been described to help people irrespective of class and caste. He maintained a lot of cows.
