= Chinna Anuppanadi =

Anuppanadi Anuppunari
- Social Services Team
- Location in Tamil Nadu, India
- Coordinates: 9°53′19″N 78°8′36″E
- Country: India
- State: Tamil Nadu
- District: Madurai

Population (2001)
  - Total: 15,415

Languages
  - Official: Tamil
- Time zone: UTC+5:30 (IST)

Anuppanadi is a census town in Madurai district in the state of Tamil Nadu, India.

== Demographics ==
As of 2001 India census, Chinna Anuppanadi had a population of 15,415. Males constitute 51% of the population and females 49%. Chinna Anuppanadi has an average literacy rate of 70%, higher than the national average of 59.5%; with male literacy of 77% and female literacy of 63%. 11% of the population is under 6 years of age.

== Politics ==
It is part of the Madurai (Lok Sabha constituency). S. Venkatesan also known as Su. Venkatesan from CPI(M) is the Member of Parliament, Lok Sabha, after his election in the 2019 Indian general election.
