= Veera Yuga Nayagan Velpari =

2018 novel by Su. Venkatesan

- Author: Su. Venkatesan
- Original title: வீரயுக நாயகன் வேள்பாரி
- Cover artist: Maniam Selvam
- Language: Tamil
- Subject: Vēl Pāri
- Genre: Historical fiction
- Publisher: Vikatan publishers, Chennai
- Publication date: 29 December 2018
- Pages: 1,408

Veera Yuga Nayagan Velpari is a Tamil language historical fiction novel written by Tamil writer Su. Venkatesan, first serialized in the Tamil weekly magazine Ananda Vikatan from 2016 to 2018 for 111 weeks. The novel reimagines the life of Vēl Pāri, a velir ruler of Parambu Nadu during the Sangam period (circa 3rd century BCE) in ancient Tamilakam. Celebrated as one of the "Last seven great patrons" in Tamil literature, Pari is known for his benevolence, patronage of arts, and resistance against the powerful Chera, Chola and Pandya kingdoms. The novel blends historical facts with fictional storytelling, offering a portrayal of Tamil culture, warfare, and societal dynamics. The illustration for the book was done by Manian Selvam.

== Synopsis ==
The book narrates the story of Vēḷ Pari, a benevolent and courageous ruler of Parambu Nadu, a region spanning parts of modern-day Tamil Nadu and Kerala. Known for his patronage of arts and resistance against the dominant Chera, Chola, and Pandya kingdoms, Pari is depicted as a multifaceted figure. Volume 1, often referred to as "The Making of a Warrior", covers Velpari's early life, while Volume 2, "Epic Battles and Legacy", focuses on his military campaigns against the three major kingdoms.

=== Volume 1 ===
The Making of a Warrior traces Velpari's early years, detailing his upbringing, training, and the challenges that shape him into a formidable warrior. It provides insights into the geography, lifestyle, and traditions of the velir race, including their food culture, medicinal practices, and romantic entanglements.

=== Volume 2 ===
Epic Battles and Legacy focuses on Velpari's leadership in battles against the combined forces of the Chera, Chola, and Pandya kingdoms. It highlights his strategic brilliance and bravery, detailing significant events such as the deaths of his companions Thisaivezar and Thekkan, the capture of Neelan during a women's gathering for Myla, and a climactic assault on Parambu Nadu triggered by the violation of war rules. Velpari employs unconventional tactics, such as using insects as a night time strategy. The narrative also explores the political and social dynamics that led to the alliance against Velpari.

The story blends historical facts with fiction, emphasizing Velpari's legacy as a tribal chieftain who stood against exploitation. It incorporates elements from Sangam literature, such as the sacrifice of Kapilar, Pari's poet friend, as referenced in the Purananuru.

== Main characters ==
The central figure is Vēḷ Pari (Velpari). Other important characters include:

- Kapilar, a poet and close friend of Pari, a prolific poet of Sangam literature
- Myla, a strong female character involved in plot developments
- Neelan, whose capture triggers major events
- Thisaivezar and Thekkan, warriors
- Parambu, leading a controversial final assault
- Kalamban, an opponent in an honest fight with Pari

== Key themes ==
Venkatesan has said that he set out to revive the lost book Kabilam, written by the Tamil poet Kapilar, and that he "re-imagined Pari the way Kabilar would have possibly done it". He frames the novel as a way to bring bringing Sangam-era Tamil culture to modern readers, allowing indigenous Tamil stories to compete with Western media. He describes Pari not only as a generous ruler but also as a tribal chieftain who stood against exploitation by the dominant powers of his time. In the novel, he says, he expresses themes of valor, kindness, resistance against powerful kingdoms, and the conflict between nature and human greed.

The scholar G. Anitha argues that, in the novel, the Tamil language is inseparable from the Parambu people's way of life.

== Publication history ==
The novel first serialized in the Tamil weekly magazine Ananda Vikatan from 2016 to 2018 for 111 weeks. It was the first fictional work in four decades to run for over 100 installments. At the end of 2018, it was republished as a two-volume book by Vikatan Publishers. The book has sold over one lakh copies in Tamil. A function was organised in July 2025 to celebrate this milestone which was graced by Rajinikanth, Gopinath Chandran, S. Shankar and others.

== Adaptation ==
Tamil filmmaker Shankar has announced plans to adapt this book into a three-part film, with script work completed as of January 2025. Shankar, who holds the copyright, has warned filmmakers against unauthorized use of the novel's scenes, emphasizing the need to respect creators' rights. This warning was reportedly prompted by similarities observed in the trailer of the film Devara: Part 1 (2024), though no specific legal action has been confirmed.
