= Vaiyāvik Kōpperum Pēkan =

Tamil king

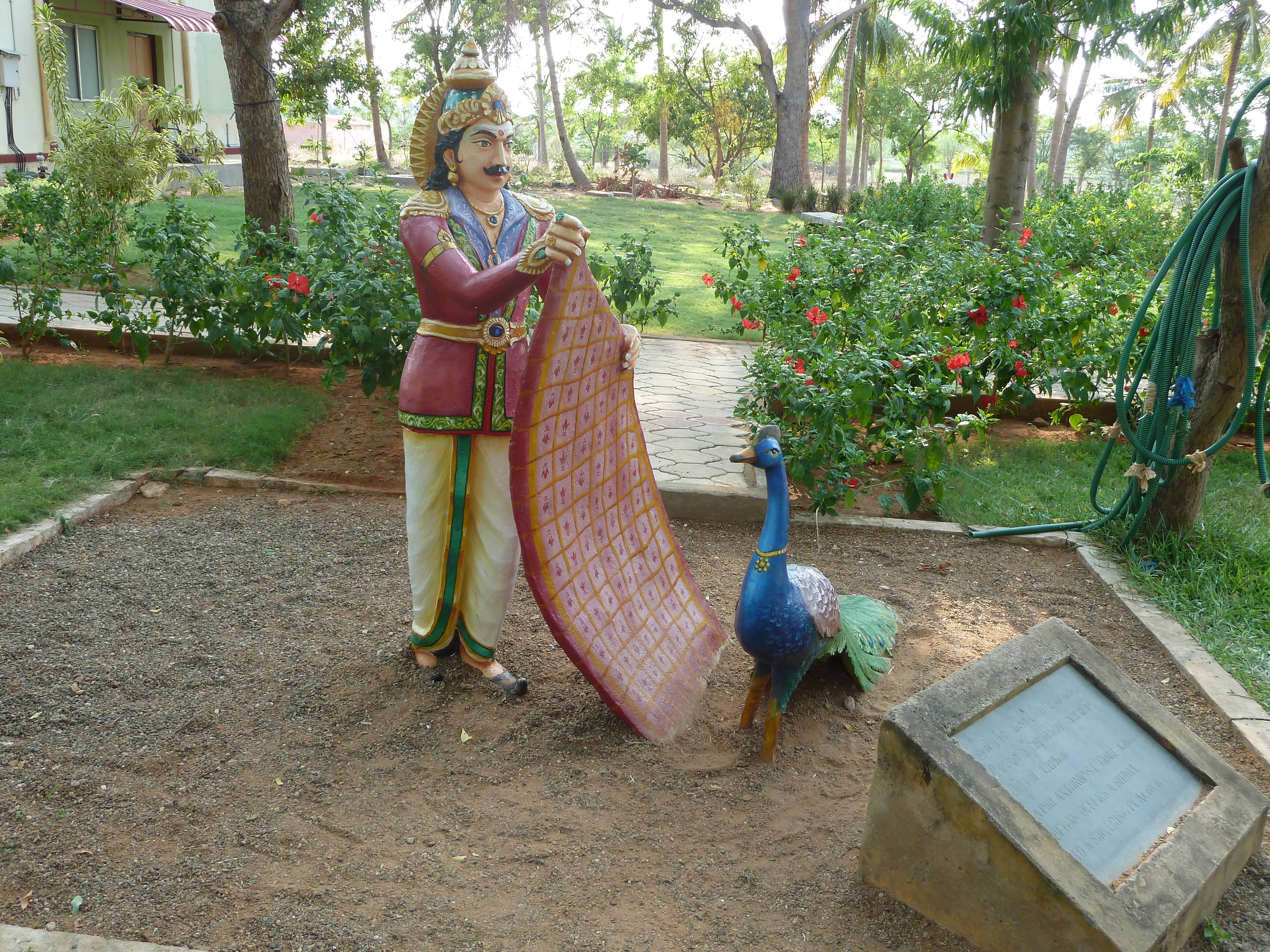
Vaiyāvik Kōpperum Pegan giving blanket to peacock

Vaiyāvik Kōpperum Pēgan was a Tamil Vēlir king and one of the kadai ezhu vallal of arts and literature during the Sangam era. He was the lord of the Āviyar clan of Vēls, a contemporary of poet Paranar, and was known for his lavish gifts and kindness. The Āviyar line of Vēls ruled over the area around Palani hills and bore the title Vēl Āvi.

== An act of kindness ==
According to tradition, once when Pēkan was going around his country, he sees a peacock shivering in the rain and cloaks it with his gold laced silk robe; (Purananuru, song 145 of Paranar):

With your elephants in rut, with your proud horses, with your fame that does not fade,
Pēkan, you who gave your cloak to the dark mindless peacock, because it was shivering in the cold.

== Squanderer of wealth but a warrior nevertheless ==
Pēkan was a patron of not only bards but was known to bestow lavish gifts on just about anyone who visited his court. This incited his court poet Paranar who mocks that his patron was ignorant to the point of being foolish when it came to giving away gifts but at the same time was not so ignorant in battle; (Purananuru-song 142):

Like the clouds who form part of an endless family
raining down on the dry reservoirs, on the wide fields,
even on arid salt flats than where they might be useful,
with his elephants in rut, war anklets on his feet,
this is Pēkan! Ignorant though he is of how to grant gifts,
marching against an enemy army, no ignorance marches with him

== Infidelity ==
Pēkan was a philanderer and was unfaithful towards his virtuous wife who is often compared to Kannaki, the goddess pattini of Silapathikaram. He indulges in dancing women in Nallur(near present day Tuticorin in Tamil Nadu) and abandons his wife at which point the latter seeks the help of various poets to bring him back home. Even though he was king, the poets rally behind his wife and question his actions while urging him to return home:

- Purananuru, an excerpt of song (143) by Kapilar:

..Pēkan of the swift horses! You who rage in war! You who generously grant gifts!
Who may that poor woman be?..where I praised you and sang of your mountain,
she was there, not able to hold back a fierce flowing of tears.

- Purananuru, an excerpt of song (145) by Paranar:

..I come to you not because I am hungry, not because of the burden of my family!
But the gift for which I beg is that tonight you may mount your chariot strung with bells and free her of the anguish she lives with,
and for that I sing "May those who love mercy act with justice!".

- Purananuru, an excerpt of song (146) by AricilKilār:

We don't want your wealth! We don't want your precious gems!
Pēkan, who kills in battle! If you would show me your favour and give me a gift..
..then lord! hitch the horses to your towering chariot of great speed,
so that upon that pitiful young woman..wasting away with gnawing grief, a sight of suffering,
they may with sweet smoke perfume the hair lush as the tail of a peacock and then lifted by the wind.

- Purananuru, an excerpt of song (147) by PerunkunrurKilār:

..you should grant me the gift of yourself setting out today,
so that the woman beautifully dark with eyes,
that are cold and proud and are streaked with red lines..
..may have her hair..decorated with fresh flowers,
she who was standing in solitude yesterday beside your house,
listening to the sound of sweet monsoon,
O! King of the Āviyārs

Even though tradition paints a rosy picture that Pēkan finally came to his senses, in reality there is no evidence that the king corrected his erring ways and returned to his virtuous queen.

== See also ==
- Purananuru
