= Mannukketha Ponnu =

- Title card
- Directed by: Ramarajan
- Written by: Ramarajan
- Produced by: P. S. V Hariharan
- Starring: Pandiyan; Ilavarasi
- Cinematography: K. S. Selvaraj
- Edited by: R. Bhaskaran; Krishnamurthy
- Music by: Gangai Amaran
- Production company: P. S. V. Pictures
- Release date: 8 February 1985
- Running time: 129 minutes
- Country: India
- Language: Tamil

Mannukketha Ponnu (transl. Down-to-earth girl) is a 1985 Indian Tamil-language drama film, directed by Ramarajan in his directorial debut and produced by P. S. V. Hariharan. The film stars Pandiyan and Ilavarasi, with Goundamani, Senthil, Vinu Chakravarthy, Gandhimathi and Kovai Sarala in supporting roles. It was released on 8 February 1985.

== Plot ==
A man is very loyal towards his master who has also raised him. When his master's daughter returns to the village, the two fall in love after initial hiccups

== Cast ==
- Pandiyan as Marudhan
- Ilavarasi as Bhaggiyam
- Goundamani as Vishamurukki Veluchami
- Senthil as Ammavasai
- Vinu Chakravarthy as Bhaggiyam's father
- Gandhimathi as Bhaggiyam's mother
- Chandrasekhar
- Kovai Sarala as Thenmozhi
- Pasi Sathya as Villager
- K. K. Soundar as Villager
- Pasi Narayanan as Villager
- T. K. S. Natarajan as Patient of Veluchami
- Vellai Subbaiah as Patient of Veluchami
- Idichapuli Selvaraj as Station Master

Guest appearances

- Nizhalgal Ravi as Military
- Nalini as Janaki

== Production ==
The filming including the song "Anandham Indru" was held at a village Nanjagoundenpalayam near Gobichettipalayam.

== Soundtrack ==
Music was composed by Gangai Amaran.

Title	Singer(s)	Duration
"Poongatre Antha Ponne"	Malaysia Vasudevan, P. Susheela	4:28
"Anandham Indru"	K. J. Yesudas, Vani Jairam	4:20
"Vethalai Madichu"	Gangai Amaran, S. P. Sailaja	4:22
"Alli Pookalle"	Vani Jairam	4:29
"Enna Patti Kettu"	Ilaiyaraaja and Chorus	3:34

== Reception ==
Jayamanmadhan (a duo) of Kalki wrote the plot reminded them of films like Kizhakke Pogum Rail and Puthiya Vaarpugal and felt Pandiyan and Ilavarasi were there because the film needed a hero and heroine. The duo however praised Gangai Amaran's music, Goundamani's comedy and acting of Chandrasekar and concluded there is youthfulness and songs with humming but the others are plain old.
