= Nagavakulam =

Naganakulam naganakulam
- city
- Location in Tamil Nadu, India
- Coordinates: 9°57′46″N 78°08′21″E
- Country: India
- State: Tamil Nadu
- District: Madurai

Population (2001)
  - Total: 17,579

Languages
  - Official: Tamil
- Time zone: UTC+5:30 (IST)

Naganakulam is a town in Madurai District in the Indian state of Tamil Nadu.

== Demographics ==
As of 2001 India census, Naganakulam had a population of 17,579. Males constitute 51% of the population and females 49%. Naganakulam has an average literacy rate of 80%, higher than the national average of 59.5%: male literacy is 83%, and female literacy is 77%. In Naganakulam, 7% of the population is under 6 years of age.

== Politics ==
It is part of the Madurai (Lok Sabha constituency). S. Venkatesan also known as Su. Venkatesan from CPI(M) is the Member of Parliament, Lok Sabha, after his election in the 2019 Indian general election.
