= Athiyamān Nedumān Añci =

Velir king

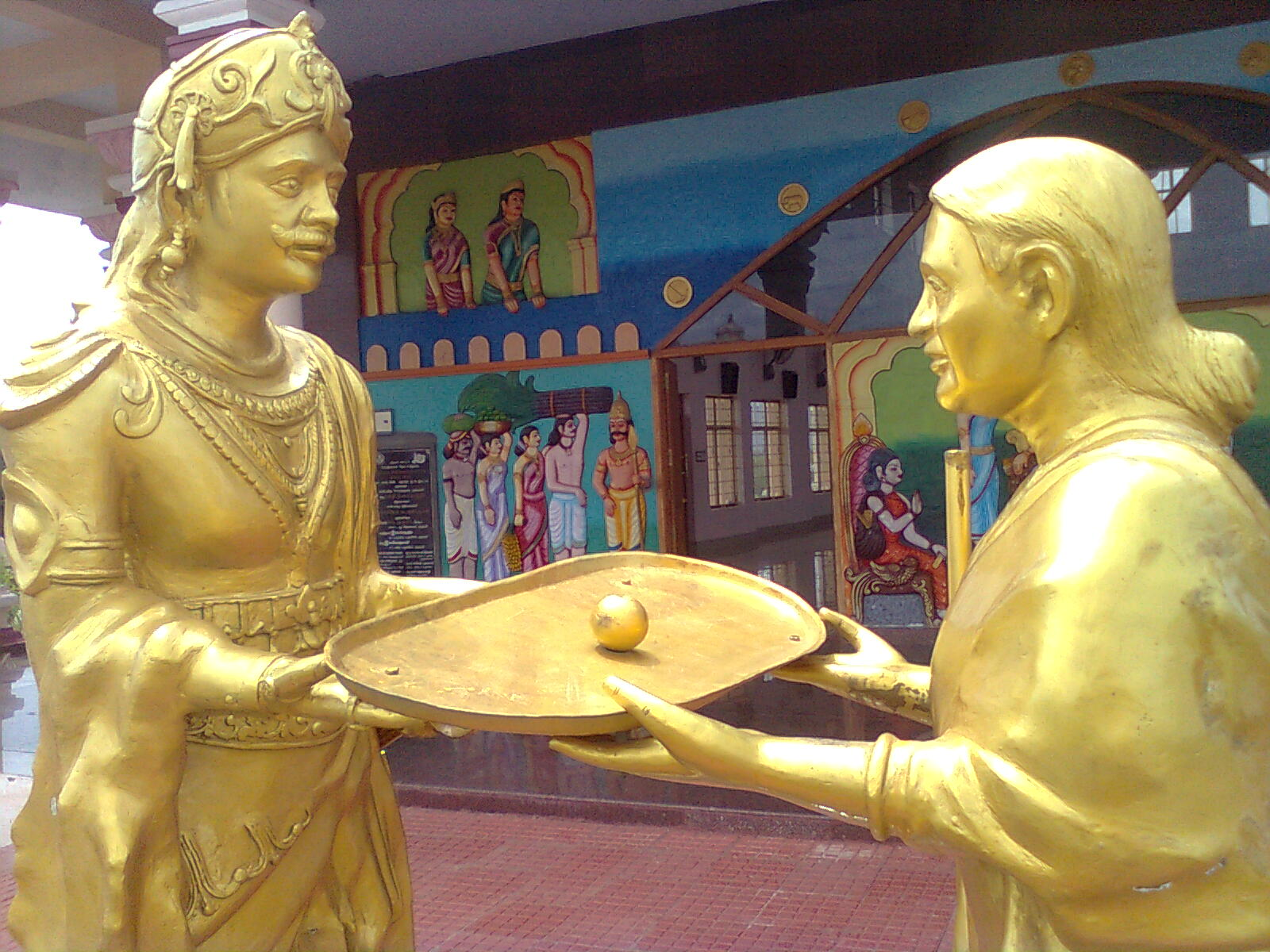
- Athiyaman Neduman Anci giving gift to Avvaiyar
- Reign: c. 1st century CE
- Born: Anci
- Issue: Athiyamaṉ Pokuṭṭeḻiṉi
- Dynasty: Athiyaman

Athiyaman Neduman Anci was one of the velir kings of the Sangam period who ruled the Mazhanadu region. Belonging to the Athiyaman clan, he was the contemporary and the patron of poet Avvaiyar. He ruled over the area encompassing present day Dharmapuri, Krishnagiri, and Salem with the capital at Tagadur. They were one of the kadai ezhu vallal (last seven great patrons) of the ancient Tamil country.

== Patron of Avvaiyar ==
When poet Avvaiyar visited the court of Athiyamān Nedumān Añci, he liked her so much that he deliberately delayed in giving her gifts to prolong her stay. The poet at first not realizing the game, got angry and condemned him and then later when she realized the true motive, became so fond him that she decided to stay and became his close friend. On another occasion, he gave her a rare gooseberry(nelli in Tamil) that was considered to improve one's life expectancy.

== A warrior ==
Avvaiyar described her patron as a hardened warrior, Purananuru, song 87:

Enemies! take care,
when you enter the field of battle,
Among us is a warrior, who is like a chariot wheel,
made painstakingly by a carpenter,
who tosses off eight chariots in a day!

In 118 CE, another king Malaiyamān Thirumudi Kāri of the Kadai ezhu vallal waged war on Thagadur against Athiyamān Nedumān Añci. It was an attempt fuelled by his longtime desire to become an emperor equivalent in power to the Cholas. After a fierce battle, Kāri lost Kovalur to Athiyamān and only regained it much later after Peruncheral Irumporai sacked Tagadur.

== Friendship with the Cholas ==
Athiyamān Nedumān Añci lived in one of the most turbulent periods and was looking at an imminent invasion by the Cheras and the Cholas. He sent Avvaiyar as an envoy to the court of Ilantiraiyan of Kanchi who was a viceroy of the Chola sovereign and later allied himself with the latter to deter the Chera king. Avvaiyar was given a grand welcome by Tondaimān who then went on to proudly show her his archery. Though impressed, Avvaiyar refused to give up her patron by subtly hinting that the king's weapons sparkled as they were probably never used whereas the arsenal of her patron were all worn out as they had seen numerous wars.

== Valiant opponent of Peruñcēral Irumporai ==
But this congregation of Nedumān Añci with the Chola and Pandya did not deter the Chera emperor, Peruñcēral Irumporai who finally arrived and sacked Tagadur. In spite of his small army, Nedumān Añci, led from the front and valiantly went down fighting in the battle field. AricilKilār, the war bard of Peruñcēral Irumporai, paid due homage to the opponent of his patron as he eulogised his king in Tagadur-Yāttarai.

Upon his death, a distressed Avvaiyar sang a number of elegies:

- an excerpt from Purananuru, song 235:

If he had a little liquor, he would give it to us
Where is he now?
..if he had even a little rice, he shared it in many plates
Where is he now?
..He gave us all the flesh on the bones
Where is he now?
Wherever spear and arrows flew, he was there
Where is he now?
..father, mainstay, king
Where is he now?.

- an excerpt from Purananuru, song 231:

..The fame of our sun-like king
his white umbrellas
cool as the moon
will not blacken
will not die!

== Inscriptions ==
A good number of inscriptions in Jambai in Tirukkoyilur taluk have been discovered which help us identify the Satyaputras of the Ashoka's edicts:

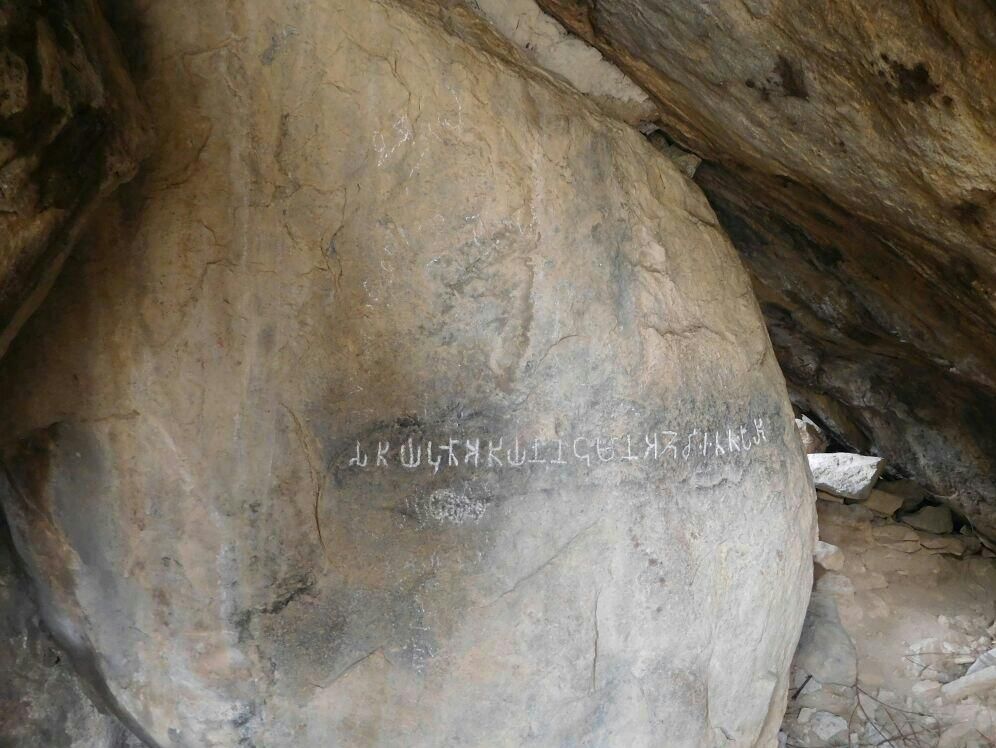
Tamil Inscription at Jambai, Tirukovilur, Tamil Nadu

Satyaputō Athiyan Nedumān Añji itta Pali

The abode given by Athiyan Nedumān Añji, the Satyaputō

These put to rest any speculation regarding the identity of Satyaputras as being non-Tamil and goes on to show the greatness of this line as they are mentioned on par with the other three Tamil kingdoms.
