= Mazhanadu =

Mazhanadu Mazhavarnadu
- Geographical area
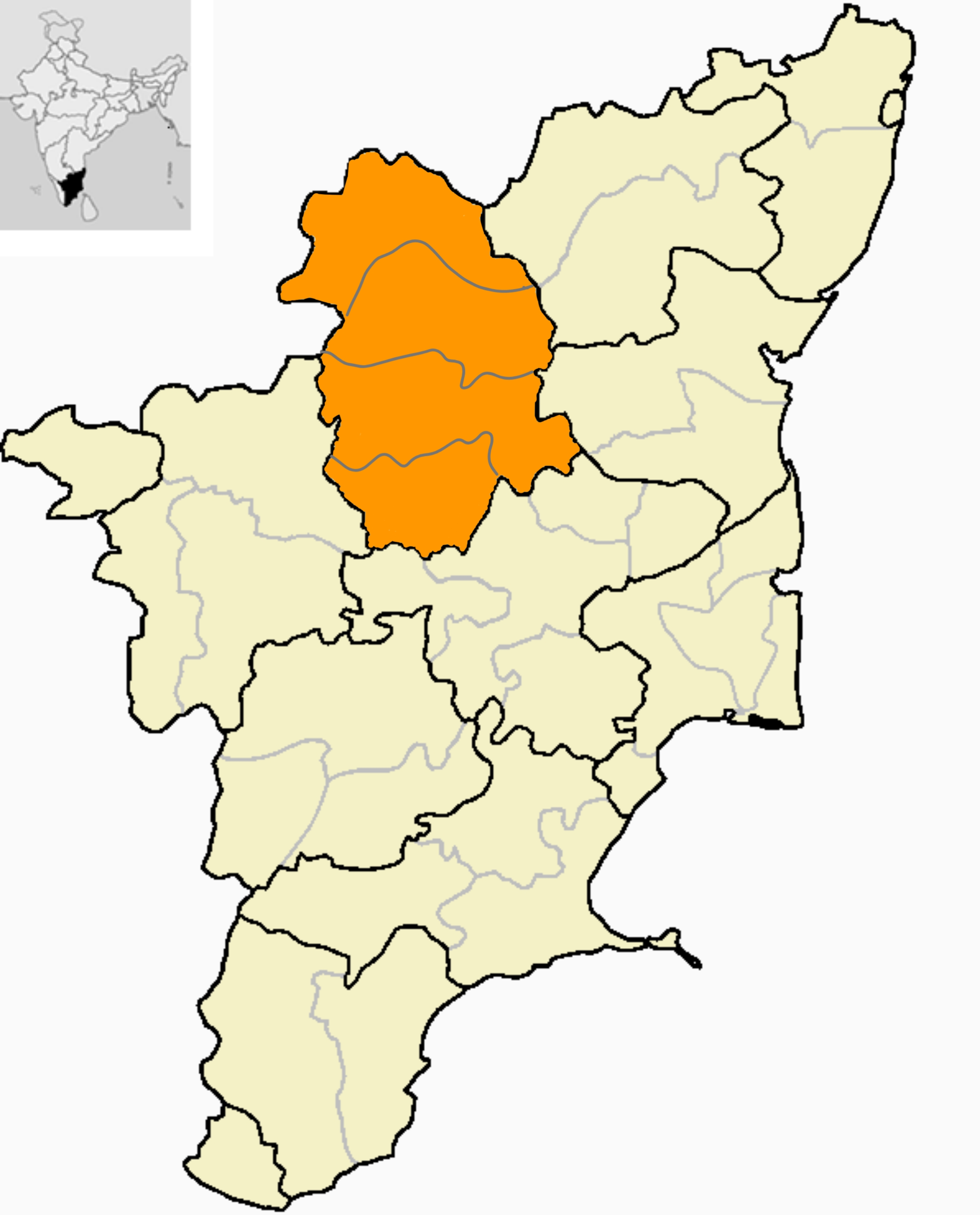
- Salem, Tamil Nadu, largest metropolitan city in the region.
- Nickname: Steel City
- Country: India
- State: Tamil Nadu
- Region: Mazhanadu
- Covering districts: Dharmapuri, Krishnagiri
- Largest City: Salem

Government
  - Body: Government of Tamil Nadu, Government of India

Population (2011)
  - Total: 8,595,309
  - Density: 472/km^{2} (1,220/sq mi)

Languages
  - Official: Tamil
- Time zone: UTC+5:30 (IST)
- PIN: 620-636xxx
- Vehicle registration: TN 24, TN 27, TN 28, TN 29, TN 30, TN 34, TN 45, TN 46, TN 48, TN 52, TN 54, TN 61, TN 70, TN 77, TN 88, TN 90, TN 93

Mazhanadu is a region between Tondai Nadu and Karnataka, formerly known as Mazhavarnadu. This region was owned by the Chera Dynasty. It includes the Districts of Salem, Namakkal, Dharmapuri and Krishnagiri. In the ancient sangam age this region was ruled by Mazhavar King Kolli Mazhavan. Famous Sangam poet Avvaiyar had cordial relations with the Mazhavar chieftains like Athiyamān Nedumān Añci of Thagadoor and Valvil Ori of Kollimalai. Mazhanadu was divided into two major divisions, namely Mel-Mazhanadu (Western Mazhanadu) and Keezh-Mazhanadu (Eastern-Mazhanadu). Keezh-Mazhanadu was once ruled by Kolli Mazhavan and his successors, and was well known for its water resources. It was mentioned in a Tamil poem.

== Demographics and Geography ==
The table below lists geographic and demographic parameters for districts that constitute Mazhanadu.

S.No.	Districts	Headquarters	Established	Area (km^{2})	Population (2011 Census)	Population density (/km^{2})
1	Salem	Salem	1 November 1956	5,205	3,482,056	669
2	Dharmapuri	Dharmapuri	2 October 1965	4,497.77	1,506,843	335
3	Namakkal	Namakkal	1 January 1997	3363	1,726,601	513
4	Krishnagiri	Krishnagiri	9 February 2004	5,143	1,879,809	366
