= Valvil Ori =

- King of Kolli Hills
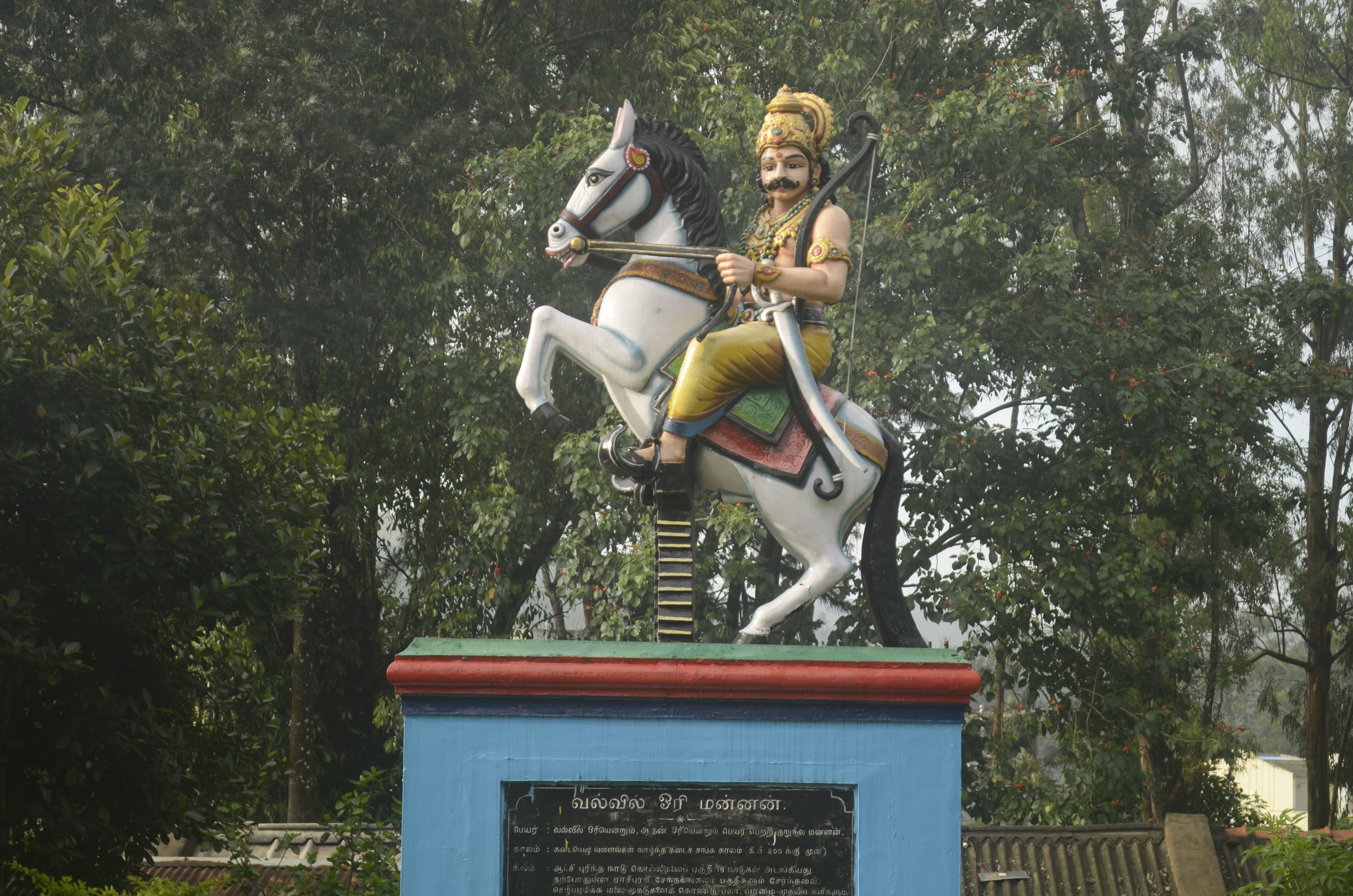
- A statue of Valvil Ori
- Reign: Unknown - c.120 CE
- Successor: Perum Cheral Irumporai (by annexation)
- Died: c.120 CE; Kolli Hills (probably) (in present-day Namakkal/Tiruchirappalli districts, Tamil Nadu, India)

Valvil Ori was a Tamil king and skilled archer, who ruled Kolli Hills region in present day Tamil Nadu. He is named as one of the kadai ezhu vallal (last seven great patrons) in Sangam literature. Politically he aligned with the Cholas and fought against the Cheras and Malaiyaman Thirumudi Kari. Legend claims that he was defeated and killed by Kari of the beautiful spear, the lord of Mullur, who then gave Kolli hills to the Cheras. Kari was later killed by the Chola king Killivalavan. Sangam poetry states that he shot an elephant, a tiger, a deer, a wild boar, and a monitor Lizard in a single shot. Regional variations include other animals, like sparrows and finches.

== Quotes ==
"He was widely famed for his skill in killing, the one who shoots with his strong bow.

His perfectly shot arrow killed a tiger with gaping mouth, dropped a spotted stag with hollow horns, felled a boar with head like mortar, and embedded in a monitor lizard in a nearby deep hole. Who is the archer who shoots with such skill? He does not look like a murderer. With a pearl strand on his proud chest, he looks like a man with great wealth. Is it Ŏri, lord of the richly yielding mountain with waterfalls on its slopes, or was it someone else? I said, "Viralis, I will sing, you spread clay on the mula drum, pluck the strings of your yal, play the trumpet that is open at one end like an elephant's trunk, beat the ellari drum, strike the akuli drum, softly hit the pathalai drum on its single eye, and place in my hand the black rod that foretells the future," and I approached him. We sang twenty one themes of songs before him in the manner in which they should be sung, and addressed him as "King!" for which he was embarrassed since it was his title. We told him that we go to different countries and have seen no hunter who can be compared to him.

Without asking us for what we wanted, he gave us boiled fatty meat of deer that been killed in hunt and toddy that was like melted cow ghee. And right there, in that wasteland, he gave us fine, faultless gold mixed with heaps of sapphires from his mountain, the lord of majestic Kolli Mountain which has caves in its summits, who desires victories, and gives without holding anything back."

— Vanparanar , Purananuru - 152

"Athan Ori, who never ceases to wage murderous battles … gives each day elephants with adornments.”

— Purananuru - 153, Vanparanar.
