= Harveypatti =

City in Madurai, India

- city
- Location in Tamil Nadu, India
- Coordinates: 9°52′48″N 78°03′33″E
- Country: India
- State: Tamil Nadu
- District: Madurai

Population (2001)
  - Total: 8,135

Languages
  - Official: Tamil
- Time zone: UTC+5:30 (IST)

Harveypatti is a panchayat town in Madurai district in the Indian state of Tamil Nadu.

== Demographics ==
As of 2001 India census, Harveypatti had a population of 8135. Males constitute 50% of the population and females 50%. Harveypatti has an average literacy rate of 83%, higher than the national average of 59.5%: male literacy is 87%, and female literacy is 79%. In Harveypatti, 10% of the population is under 6 years of age. People In This Town Is More Traditional And Have More Respect To Other Religions. It Is Main Area Of Madurai Constitution. In Politics this Area plays Major Part Of Voting.

== Politics ==
It is a part of the Madurai (Lok Sabha constituency). S. Venkatesan also known as Su. Venkatesan from CPI(M) is the Member of Parliament, Lok Sabha, after his election in the 2019 Indian general election.
