= Malaiyamān Thirumudi Kāri =

Tamil king

Malaiyamān Thirumudi Kāri was a Tamil king of a royal house clan of the Malaiyamān dynasty. He is one of kadai ezhu vallal (last seven patrons), known for his generosity. The Malaiyamān chiefs ruled over the Thirukovilur area also known as Kovalur. it was ruled by kovalar kings.It was a strategically important region located on southern the banks of the Pennar river and en route from west coast to the east coast via Arikamedu in ancient Tamilakkam. Thirumudi Kari rose to become a powerful emperor in Tamilakkam before he was killed by the early Chola king Killivalavan.

== Battles ==
According to Nattrinai it's described Malaiyaman kari Valour at mullur town against Aryan invaders:

"If she succeeds, what is the use of many of

us being together? We’ll be like the Aryan invaders who ran away in fear from the very famous Mullur town, when attacked by Malaiyaman Kari with a bright sword and

an army with spears of no match "

— Natrinai - 170

Defeat against Athiyaman

In 118 CE, he waged war on Thagadoor against the famous Athiyamān Nedumān Añci. It was an attempt fuelled by his longtime desire to become an emperor equivalent in power to the Cholas. After a fierce battle, Kāri would lose Kovalur to Athiyamān and would only regain it much later after Peruncheral Irumporai sacks Tagadur.

Victory against Ōri

In 120 CE, the Chera king Paalai paadiya Perum Cheral Irumporrai sought his strategic help in the conquest of Kollimalai. Kaari agreed to conquer Kollimalai for the Chera and it was agreed that the Chera should on his behalf invade Thagadoor in order to avenge his earlier defeat. This strange pact was due to the strategically important easy access points favouring the Chera and Kaari in the case of Thagadoor and Kollimalai respectively. Kāri defeated and killed Ōri, another king and took Kolli Hills. In turn the Chera undertook the march of Thagadoor, which is memorialized in the Thagadoor Yaaththirai of Sangam literature.

== Turn of events ==
Thus with the help of the Chera, Kaari was climbing on the ladder to become an emperor. He began to overshadow the Chola King Killi Valavan. This prompted the Chola king to check Kaari's growth with an invasion on Thirukkoiloor. The battles were fierce, but Kaari was determined to win or die. As a result, the Cholas lost 10,000 soldiers in the first five days of the war. But on the sixth day the Malaiyamaan princes, Kaari's three-year-old twin sons, were caught by the intruding Chola spies, giving the Cholas an edge. Killi Valavan began dictating terms and Kaari was forced to venture into the enemy campsite, where he was caught and killed immediately.

The Chola king planned to crush the two princes by walking an elephant over them, but by the timely intervention of poet Kōvūr Kizhār, he changed his mind.

- excerpt from Purananuru song 46 by Kōvūr Kizhār:

You were born into the line of him who relieved the pain of a dove..
..They are children, still wearing their hair unoiled,
and when they see the elephant they forget their tears.
Then confused, they look around the field and feel terror, they never imagined.

The boys were raised with the patronage of the emperor and served as generals of the Chola army under Killi and his son Rasasuyam Vaetta Peru Nal Killi. After the death of Vēl Pāri, another king, poet Kapilar takes the daughters of the former and leaves them in the care of Brahmins. Later poet Auvaiyar takes them and marries them to Deiveegan of the Malaiyaman family.

== Kadai ezhu vallal ==
Malayamaan Thirumudi Kaari is considered one of the seven greatest "bestowers" of the last Sangam era – the Kadai Ezhu Vallalgal . The people of his time considered him the most modest of kings. Nobody left empty-handed after paying a visit to him and the visitor who came on barefoot would usually return mounted on a horse or an elephant of his choice. He called himself not a king but a "rightful servant of his beloved people".

- excerpt from Purananuru, song 123 by Kapilar:

Anyone, if he drinks toddy in the morning
and gets happily drunk by the time he holds court,
can give away chariots.
But Malaiyan whose good fame never lessens,
gives without getting drunk more tall ornamented chariots
than there are drops in the clouds
that form over the rich Mullūr mountain

Modesty

During peacetime, the king of Mulloor and Thirukkoiloor would usually start his daily routine in the paddy (nel), saamai and thinai fields working with his plough and sickle. He was strong and said to be so kind-hearted that he would rather plough his fields by hand than to trouble bulls to work for him.

In one story about Kaari, the Tamil poet and saint Avvaiyaar II happened to pass by his field on course a long journey. Kaari quickly recognized the tired "mother" and without introducing himself requested that she look after his field for a few minutes and help herself to his rations in the meantime, so that he could go to a nearby pond to fetch some water. The king was away for long during which time the saint ate well and fell asleep. When sun rose the next day, Kaari returned to the field to find old mother angry. Kaari revealed his identity and explained that since she was a great friend of Athiyamaan of Thagadoor, who was his archrival, he feared she would not agree if he asked her to rest in his land. So he had to make her stay awhile and bestow his land with her saintly presence. Avvaiyaar, flattered, blessed his country with perennial prosperity.

== From inscriptions and literature ==
There are a lot of inscriptions available about various chiefs from the Malaiyaman family. They mostly suffixed the title Chēdirāyan to the name of the reigning Chola king whom they served. For example, we have Vikramasola Chēdirāyan and his son Vikramasola Kovalarayan, Kulottungasola Chēdirāyan etc. They were rulers of Miladu and also bore titles such as Milad-udaiyan meaning lord of Miladu, Maladu-mannar or king of the inhabitants of hills, Malaiya-manattarkukku arasar or the king of inhabitants of the great country of hills or Malayarayar. Miladu or Maladu is a very pure Tamil form of Malainadu or the hill country. Meyporunayanar, a Chēdi king from Tirukovalur is mentioned in the Periyapuranam. Another important person from the same line was Pillai Perumāl Chēdirāyan, a contemporary of poet Kambar.

We have a lot of chiefs of the Malaiyaman family making donations to temples in and around Tirukoyilur. For example, we find that Kulothunga Chola II gifted some lands for the puja at the local Vishnu temple at the request of Kulottungasola Chēdirāyan(ARE 124 of 1900). We have another chief called Rajendra Chola Chēdirāyan making donations to the temple(ARE 388 of 1909) in Tirukkoyilur. Yet another chief, Malaiyan Chēdirāyan endowed one vēli of land to the temple at Somasikiranur.

== Notes ==
Preceded by Vēlmagan Malaiyan	King of Mulloor; 106C.E.–122C.E	Succeeded by Malaiyamaan Thirumudikkilli and Thaervann Malaiyan
