= Pariyur Kondathu Kaliamman Temple =

Temple in Tamil Nadu, India

Kondathu Kaliamman Temple
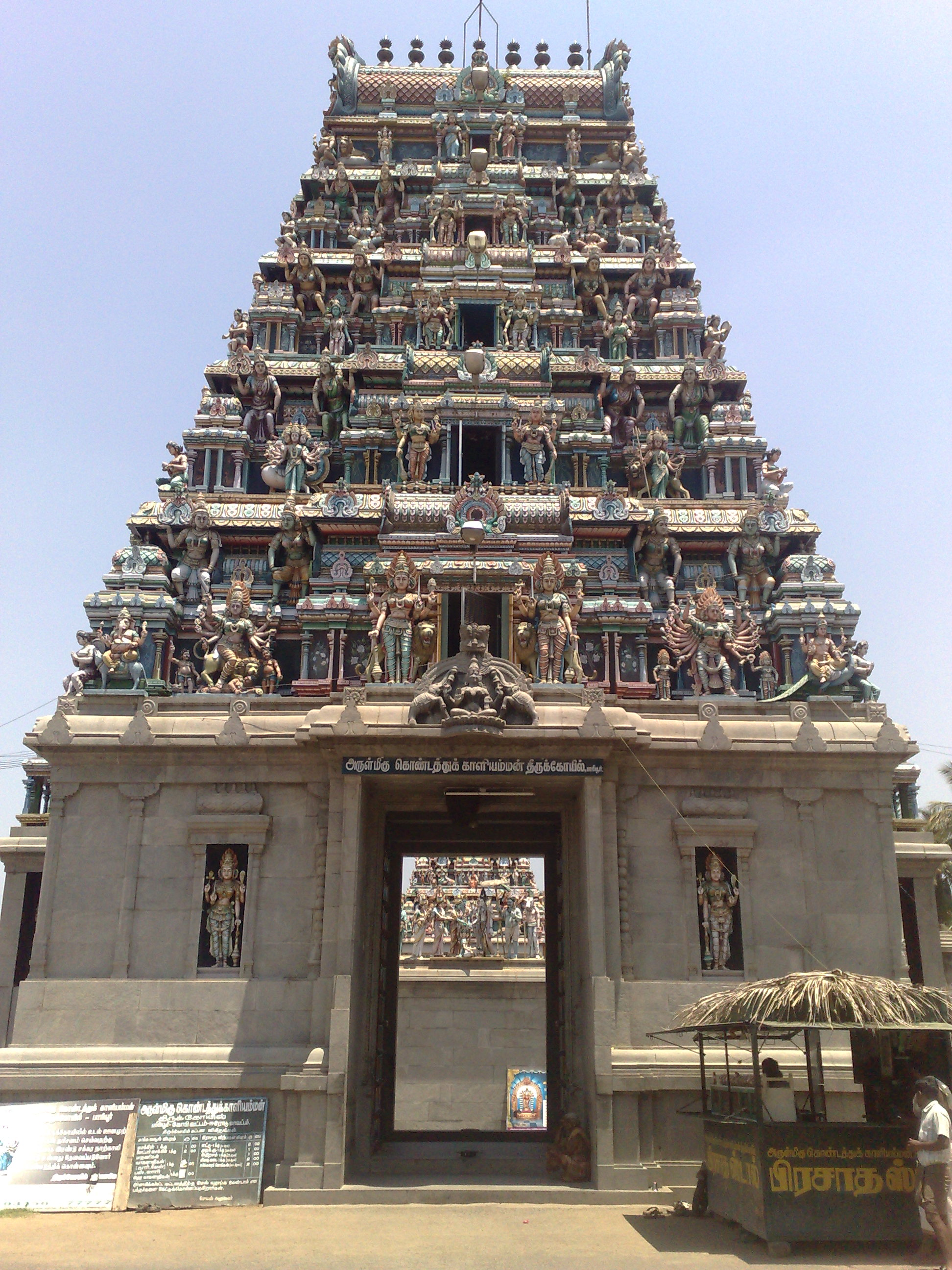
- Main Gopuram

- Location within Tamil Nadu

Religion
- Affiliation: Hinduism
- District: Erode
- Deity: Arulmigu Kondathu Kali
- Festivals: Car Festival, Pongal, Navaratri

Location
- Location: Pariyur, Gobichettipalayam
- State: Tamil Nadu
- Country: India
- Coordinates: 11°28′39″N 77°27′22″E

Architecture
- Type: Dravidian architecture

Website
- www.pariyurkondathukaliamman.tnhrce.in

Kondathu Kaliamman Temple is an Amman temple located at Pariyur near Gobichettipalayam in Tamil Nadu, India. There are other temples, namely Sri Amarapaneeswarar Temple, Sri Adinarayana Perumal Temple and Sri Angalamman Temple nearby.

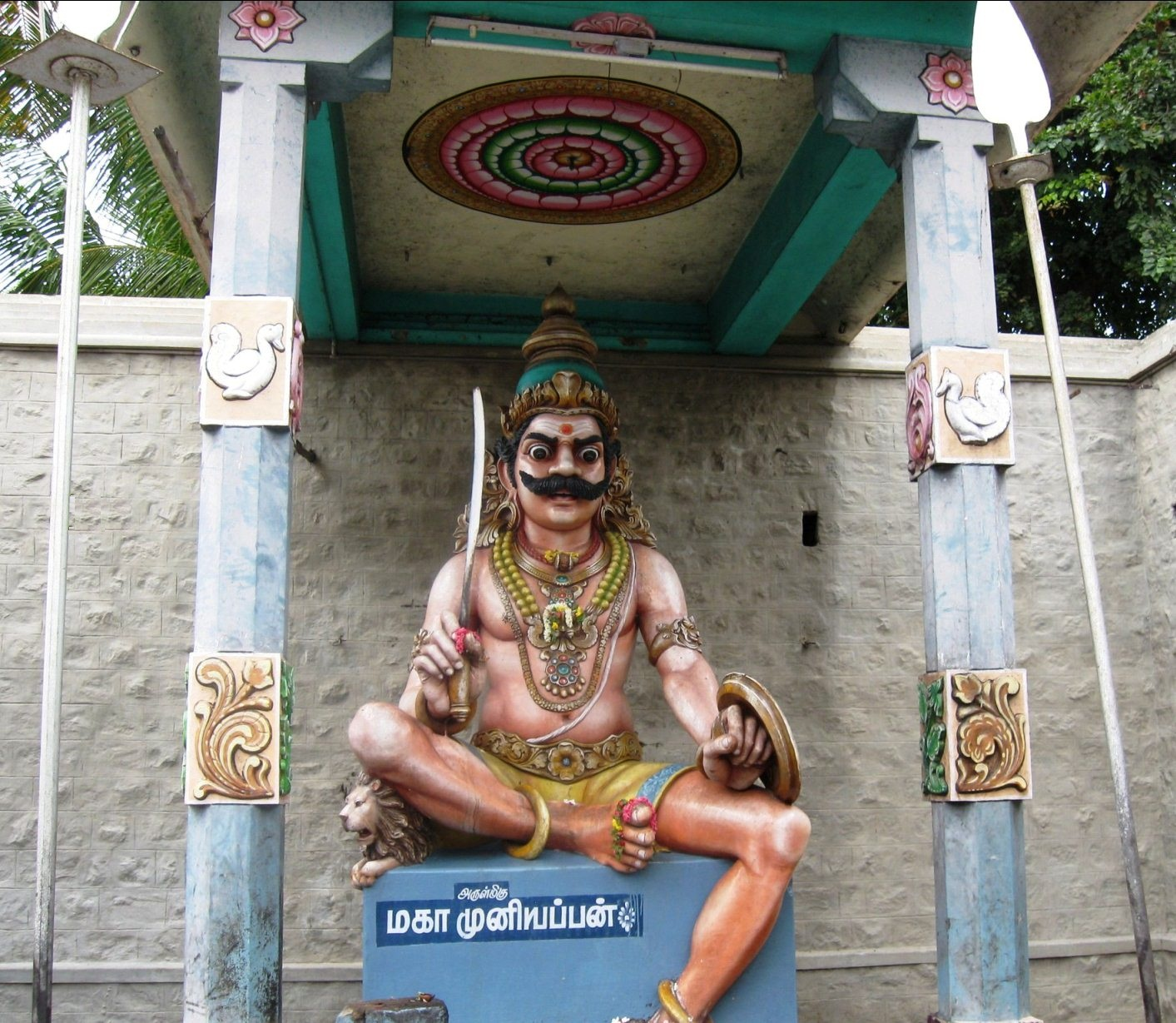
Sri Maha Muniappan

== History ==
The history of the temple dates centuries back. The exact date of establishment is unknown and the current temple was built in the mid 1950s. The place was previously known as Azhagapuri or Parapuri and the name Pariyur came from 'Pari' 'oor' meaning, 'place ruled by Pari'. Vēl Pāri was a great king who is considered in Tamil literature as one of the Kadai ēzhu vallal (literally meaning, the last of the seven great patrons). Arulmigu Kondathu Kaliamman is a powerful Goddess who was the deity responsible for the prosperity of the country ruled by Pari.

== Architecture ==
The Amman temple has a five-storey main Gopuram at the South corner and an outer mandapam covering the inner sanctum made of black marble. There are intricate carvings on the pillars of the temple including a ball shaped of single stone inside the lion's mouth. The lion is considered the main vahana (vehicle) of the Goddess. The goddess facing north wears a crown of fire and is seen stamping a demon under her feet. Rudra is believed to be on the head of the Goddess. The temple also has shrines dedicated to Siddhi Vinayagar, Sri Pon Kaliamman and Kannimar. There is a colossal statue of Sri Maha Muniappan, who is regarded as the savior against fear and evil apart from granting boons for bearing children. The divine ropes offered to Sri Maha Muniappan and Sri Kondathu Kali are considered to provide protection against evil and ill health. Apart from this, there are deities of Kaval Deivam (Guardian Deities), Brahma and other Gods/Goddess. Inside the temple, one can see the statues of Brammahi, Maheshwari, Gowmari, Vaishnavi, Mahendri and Chamundi. There is an urchavar statue normally referred to as 'Chinna Amman' which is the miniature of the main Goddess.

== Schedule and Puja ==
The temple is open from 6 am to 1 pm and from 4 pm to 8 pm. Abisegam and Puja is performed thrice daily on a normal day at 5.00 am, 11.00 am and at 5.00 pm. Archanai is performed all the time and Prasadham can be got from a stall dedicated to it.

== Special practices ==
To decide on things, people around the area ask the decision of the Goddess through a special practice known as "Vaaku Kettal" (வாக்கு கேட்டல்). They keep flowers on both the sides of the Goddess Kaliamman and the decision depends upon the flower which falls from the statue. The Goddess is specially dressed in sandal paste or turmeric paste during festivities.

== Fairs and festivals ==
The famous 'Fire Walking Ceremony' (Kundam) is held during January every year. The kundam is 40 feet in length and lakhs visit the temple during this ceremony. The annual car festival is celebrated during that with grandeur. This temple attracts a large gathering from the surrounding places all the time. The annual festival lasts for about a month. It starts with 'poochatuthal' which marks the beginning of the festival period. About two weeks after that comes a Monday when Amman is decorated in a sandal armour (santhana kaapu). A day after that Pongal is kept to honour the Goddess and ladies carry a sweet called 'pachai maavu' to be presented to the Goddess. The famous Kundam takes place the next day (Thursday) followed by the car festival the following day (Friday). On the next day, the Goddess starts on a week-long visit to the surrounding areas in a muthu palakku or pushpa palakku (caravan of flowers). The people of the surrounding areas receive the Goddess with prayer and offerings. Then finally she returns to the temple and the festival is complete. During the festival, a lot of people visit the temple to offer their prayers. A lot of temporary shops and others come up during this period synonymous with fairs in India.

The other festivals celebrated include Navaratri when the Amman poses in nine forms, Chithirai Kani (Tamil New Year), Ambu Sevai (demonstration of Goddess killing a demon), Pongal, Adi Perukku, Pongal and other Hindu festivals. Kudu Muzhukku or Kumbhabhishekam is performed once in 12 years. A midday free meal is provided to the poor in accordance with the chief minister's free anna dhaanam project. The goddess is taken for a procession on a golden chariot, around the temple premises every evening. There are two large temple cars which are taken for procession during the annual festivities. The temple cars are usually used for the procession during the festival times. A Golden armor or 'Kavacha' is also being made for the Goddess.

Because of cultural and religious importance, people prefer Pariyur for marriages. There is a marriage hall which was constructed newly at a cost of over 60 lakhs.

== Filmography ==
The temple is famous for the films that were shot here. Many Tamil and Malayalam films have been shot in and around the temple.
