= Pariyur =

Panchayat village in India

- Panchayat village
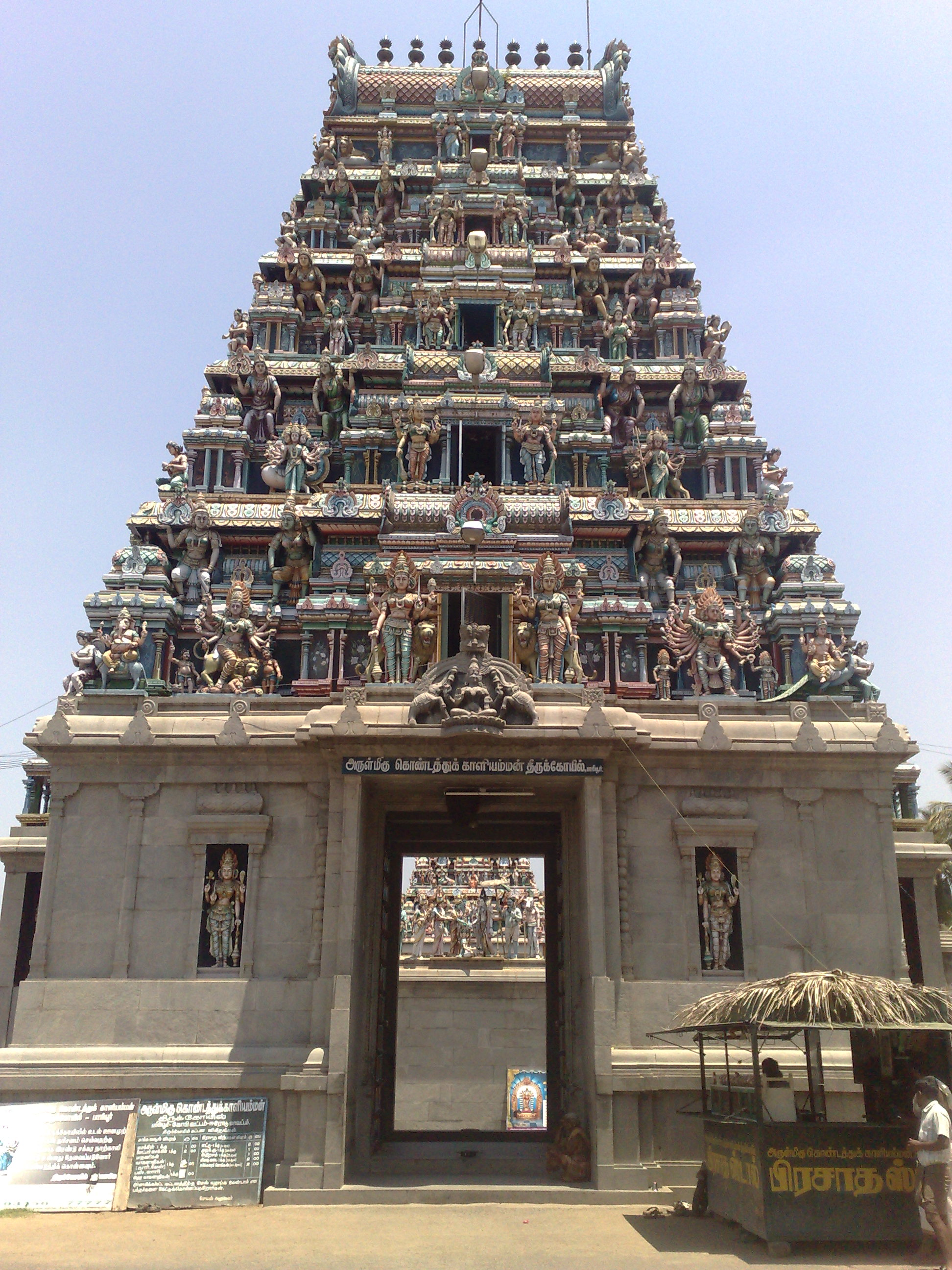
- Pariyur Kondathu Kaliamman Temple

- Location within Tamil Nadu
- Coordinates: 11°28′39″N 77°27′22″E
- Country: India
- State: Tamil Nadu
- Region: Coimbatore
- District: Erode District

Government
  - Body: GMC

Languages
  - Official: Tamil
- Time zone: UTC+5:30 (IST)
- PIN: 638476
- Telephone code: 91(04285)
- Vehicle registration: TN 36
- Literacy: 74%
- Lok Sabha constituency: Tiruppur
- Vidhan Sabha constituency: Gobichettipalayam

Pariyur is a panchayat village near Gobichettipalayam in Erode District of Tamil Nadu state, India, about 3 km from Gobichettipalayam.

Pariyur Kondathu Kaliamman Temple is in Pariyur, about 3 km from Gobichettipalayam, where a 'Fire-Walking Ceremony' (Kundam) is held every January.

== Sources ==
- https://web.archive.org/web/20130614095321/http://pariyurkondathukaliamman.org/
- https://web.archive.org/web/20131109105313/http://www.pachaimalai.in/Eng/pariyur.htm
- https://temple.dinamalar.com/en/new_en.php?id=773
