= Su. Venkatesan =

Indian writer and politician (born 1970)

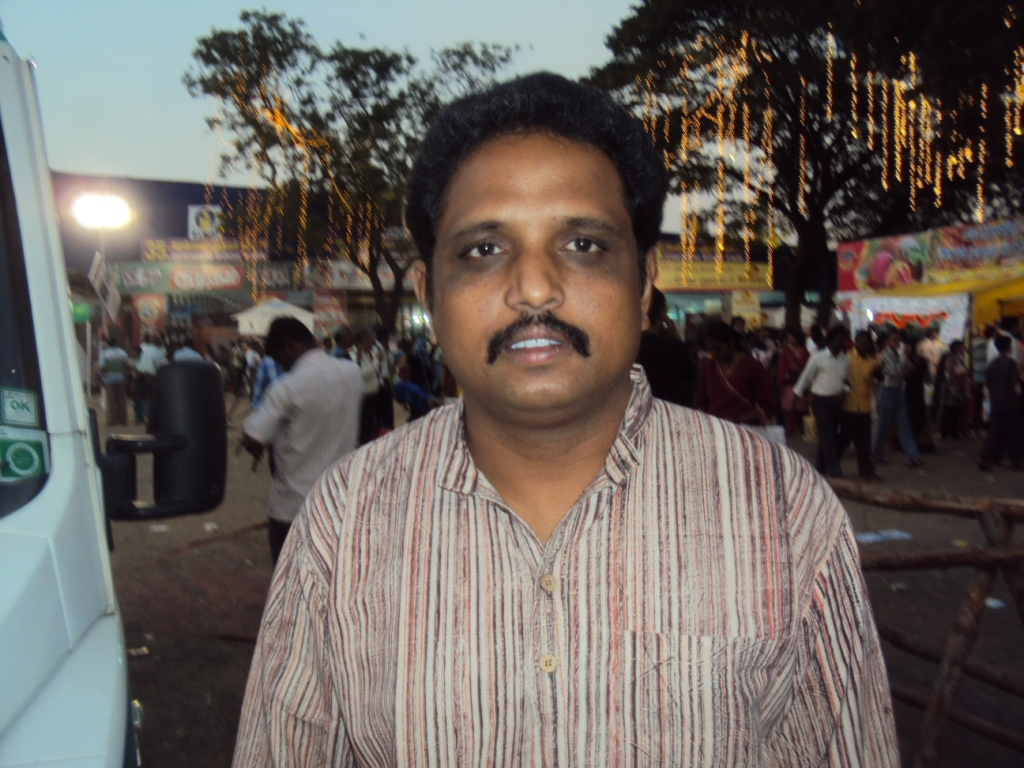
- Venkatesan in 2012

Member of Parliament, Lok Sabha
- Incumbent
- Assumed office 18 June 2019
- Preceded by: R. Gopalakrishnan
- Constituency: Madurai

President, Tamil Nadu Progressive Writers and Artists Association
- In office 24 June 2018 – 15 August 2022
- Preceded by: S. Tamilselvan
- Succeeded by: Madukkur Ramalingam

General secretary, Tamil Nadu Progressive Writers and Artists Association
- In office 18 September 2011 – 24 June 2018
- Preceded by: S. Tamilselvan
- Succeeded by: Aadhavan Dheetchanya

Personal details
- Born: 16 March 1970 (age 56) Harveypatti, Madurai, Tamil Nadu, India
- Party: Communist Party of India (Marxist)
- Education: Mannar Thirumalai Naicker College
- Occupation: Writer; politician
- Awards: Sahitya Akademi Award (2011)

Su. Venkatesan (born 16 March 1970) is an Indian writer from Tamil Nadu and a Tamil Nadu State Committee member of the Marxist Communist Party of India. He is the state honorary president of the Tamil Nadu Progressive Writers and Artists Association.

== Writing ==
Venkatesan received the Sahitya Akademi Award for his 2008 novel, Kaavalkottam, which serves as the basis of the 2012 film Aravaan. His second novel, Veera Yuga Nayagan Velpari (2018), was serialised in the magazine Ananda Vikatan. He is the general secretary of the Tamil Nadu Progressive Writers and Artists Association.

== Politics ==
Venkatesan joined the Marxist Communist Party of India and is a Member of Parliament in Madurai.

== Bibliography ==
Title	Year of publication
Kaavalkottam	2008
Veera Yuga Nayagan Velpari	2019

== Filmography ==
Year	Title	Story	Writer	Producer
2012	Aravaan	Yes	Yes	No
2025	Game Changer	No	Yes	No

== Elections contested and positions held ==
Year	Constituency	Result	Vote percentage	Opposition candidate	Opposition party	Opposition vote percentage
2019	Madurai	Won	44.20%	V. V. R. Raj Satyen	AIADMK	30.42%

Year	Positions
2019	Elected to 17th Lok Sabha
2019-2024	Member, Consultative Committee, Ministry of Railways; Member, Standing Committee, Ministry of Human Resource Development; Member, Standing Committee, Minister of Youth Affairs and Sports; Member, Standing Committee, Minister for Women and Child Development
2019	Co-chairperson, Madurai Airport Advisory Committee

== Rewards and recognition ==
Award	Year	Remarks
Vikatan Awards	2008	For Kaavallottam
Sahitya Akademi Award	2011	For Kaavallottam
Tamilan Awards – Promising Stars	2012	For best literary contribution
Iyal Award	2019	Lifetime Achievement from the Tamil Literary Garden, Canada
Best International Tamil Work Award	2020	From the Tan Sri K.R. Soma Language and Literary Foundation, Malaysia

== See also ==
- List of Sahitya Akademi Award winners for Tamil
- List of Indian writers
- List of Tamil-language writers
