= Purananuru =

Work of classical Tamil literature

The Purananuru (Puṟanāṉūṟu, literally "four hundred [poems] in the genre puram"), sometimes called Puram or Purappattu, is a classical Tamil poetic work and traditionally the last of the Eight Anthologies (Ettuthokai) in the Sangam literature. It is a collection of 400 heroic poems about kings, wars and public life, of which two are lost and a few have survived into the modern age in fragments. The collected poems were composed by 157 poets, of which 14 were anonymous and at least 10 were women. This anthology has been variously dated between 1st century BCE and 5th century CE, with Kamil Zvelebil, a Tamil literature scholar, dating predominantly all of the poems of Purananuru sometime between 2nd and 5th century CE. Nevertheless, few poems are dated to the period of 1st century BCE.

The Purananuru anthology is diverse. Of its 400 poems, 138 praise 43 kings – 18 from the Chera dynasty, 13 Chola dynasty kings, and 12 Early Pandya dynasty kings. Another 141 poems praise 48 chieftains. These panegyric poems recite their heroic deeds, as well as another 109 poems that recount deeds of anonymous heroes, likely of older Tamil oral tradition. Some of the poems are gnomic in nature, which have attracted unrealistic attempts to read an ethical message, states Zvelebil. The poetry largely focuses on war, means of war such as horses, heroic deeds, widowhood, hardships, impermanence, and other effects of wars between kingdoms based along the rivers Kaveri, Periyar and Vaigai.

The Purananuru is the most important Tamil corpus of Sangam era courtly poems, and it has been a source of information on the political and social history of ancient Tamil Nadu. According to Hart and Heifetz, the Purananuru provides a view of the Tamil society before large-scale Indo-Aryan influences affected it. The life of the Tamils of this era revolved around the king, emphasized the purity of women and placed limitations on the rights of widows. Further, the compilation suggests that the ancient Tamils had a caste system called kuti. The anthology is almost entirely a secular treatise on the ancient Tamil thought on kingship, the constant state of wars within old Tamil-speaking regions, the bravery of heroes and the ferocious nature of this violence. According to Amritha Shenoy, the Purananuru poems eulogize war and describe "loyalty, courage, honor" as the virtues of warriors. In contrast, Sivaraja Pillai cautions that the historical and literary value of Purananuru poems may be limited because the poems were not a perfect work of art but one of compulsion from impoverished poets too eager to praise one king or another, seeking patrons through exaggeration and flattery rather than objectivity.

The Purananuru poems use words, phrases, and metaphors, including references to the Himalayas of "immeasurable heights", Shiva, Vishnu, the four Vedas, the Ramayana, rivers, and other aspects.

== Anthology ==
Among the eight Sangam anthologies, Purananuru and Pathitrupathu are concerned with life outside family – kings, wars, greatness, generosity, ethics and philosophy. While Pathitrupathu is limited to the glory of Chera kings in 108 verses, Purananuru contains an assortment of themes in 397 poems. Of the original 400 poems, two have been lost, and some poems miss several lines.

== Structure and content ==
There are 400 poems in Purananuru including the invocation poem. Each poem measures anywhere between 4 and 40 lines. Poems 267 and 268 are lost, and some of the poems exist only in fragments. The author of 14 poems remains unknown. The remaining poems were written by 157 poets. Of the poets who wrote these poems, there are men and women, kings and paupers. The oldest book of annotations found so far has annotations and commentary on the first 266 poems. The commentator Nachinarkiniyar, of the eleventh–twelfth century Tamil Nadu, has written a complete commentary on all the poems.

=== Subject matter ===
King is the soul

Not food is the soul of life
Nor water is the life's soul
It is the king
who is the life of this wide expanse of the earth
Therefore
this is the duty of the kings
with armies stocked with mighty spears:
To know:
I am the soul!

— Purananuru 186, Translator: Kamil Zvelebil

The Purananuru poems deal with the puram aspect of the Sangam literature, that is war, politics and public life. Many poems praise kings and chieftains. Some of the poems are in the form of elegies in tribute to a fallen hero. These poems exhibit outpourings of affection and emotions. Purananuru is notable for three features: the king and his believed powers over the climate and environment (rains, sunshine, successful crops), the ancient Tamil belief in the power of women's purity, namely karpu (chastity), Belief in establishing righteousness by performing Yagams and considering Brahmins pure for their recitation of the holy Four Vedas and the ancient system of caste (kuti, kudi) that existed in Tamil kingdoms.

According to Hart and Heifetz, the Purananuru content is organized in the following way (poem sequence number in brackets):

- Invocation to Shiva (1)
- Praise of kings (2-64)
- Death of the king, messengers, bards, bragging king, captive treatment, odds, speed of war, warriors, singing poets, poor poet and generous kings (65-173)
- Ethical and moral poems (182-195)
- Kings who were not generous to poets (196–211)
- Death of kings, helplessness of widows, youth versus old age, cattle raids, memorial stone, drinking, combat (213–282)
- War (283–314)
- Kings who were generous to the poor (315–335)
- Impermanence of life, the inevitability of death (336–367)
- Low-caste drummer asking king for gifts (368–400)

=== Authors ===
The collected poems were composed by 157 poets, of which 14 were anonymous and at least 10 were women poets. Some of the authors of the poems, such as Kapilar and Nakkirar, have also written poems that are part of other anthologies.

=== Structure ===
There seems to be some definite structure to the order of the poems in Purananuru. The poems at the beginning of the book deal with the three major kings Chola, Chera and Pandya of ancient Tamil Nadu. The middle portion is on the lesser kings and the Velir chieftains, who were feudatories of these three major kingdoms, with a short intervening section (poems 182–195) of didactic poems. The final portion deals with the general scenery of war and the effect of warfare. The final portion of the text explains the aftermath of the war and dead scenes. Some parts of the text mention kingdoms trying to stop the war by sending a Brahmin as an envoy to the war field, the Brahmin utters a few words to the warriors in the camp which stops the war.

=== Landscapes ===
Just as the akam (subjective) poems are classified into seven thinais or landscapes based on the mood of the poem, the Tamil prosodical tradition mentioned in the ancient Tamil grammatical treatise Tolkappiyam also classifies puram (objective) poems into seven thinais based on the subject of the poems. These are vetchi, when the king provokes war by attacking and stealing the cattle of his enemy; vanchi, when the king invades the enemy territory; uzhingai, when the king lays a siege of the enemy's fortress; thumbai, when the two armies meet on a battlefield; vaakai, when the king is victorious; paataan, when the poet praises the king on his victory; and kanchi, when the poet sings on the fragility of human life.

The Purananuru does not, however, follow this system. The colophons accompanying each poem name a total of eleven thinais. From the subject matter of the poems they accompany, each can be said to represent the following themes:

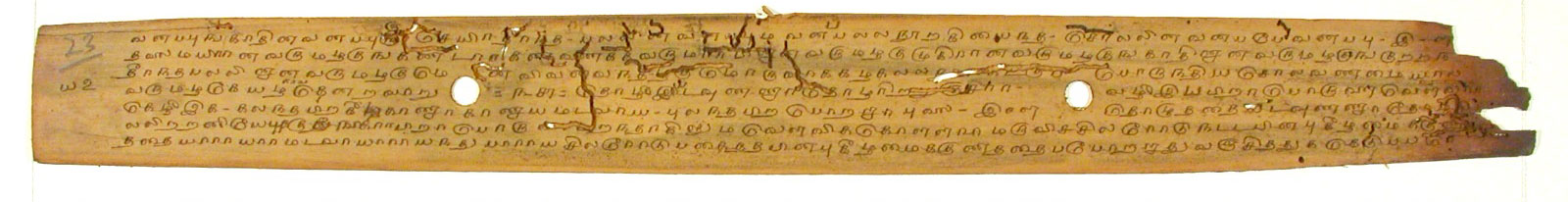
A palm leaf manuscript with ancient Tamil text

- Vetchi
- Karanthai
- Vanchi
- Nochchi
- Thumpai
- Vaakai
- Kanchi
- Paadaan
- Kaikkilai
- Perunthinai
- Pothuviyal

The Kaikkilai and Perunthinai are traditionally associated with akam poetry. In Purananuru, they occur in the context of the familiar puram landscape of warfare. Thus songs 83, 84 and 85 are classified as belonging to the kaikkilai thinai, which denotes unrequited love, and describe a noblewoman's love for King Cholan Poravai Kopperunarkilli. Similarly, songs 143 to 147 are classified as perunthinai or perunkilai thinai, which denotes unsuitable love, and deal with King Pekan's abandonment of his wife.

Pothuviyal is described in commentaries as a general thinai used for poems that cannot be classified in any other manner but, in the context of Purananuru, is used almost exclusively for didactic verse and elegies or laments for dead heroes.

== Quotes ==
Purananuru Verse - 312, describes the duties of a young man in warfare:

"It is my foremost duty to bear and raise him; it is his father's duty to make him a noble man; it is the duty of the blacksmith to forge and give him a spear; it is the duty of the king to teach him good behavior, and it is the duty of the young man to fight in harsh wars with his bright sword, killing enemy elephants and coming back."

— Ponmudiyar , Purananuru -312

=== Realism ===
Purananuru songs exhibit a unique realism and immediacy not frequently found in classical literature. The nature and the subject of the poems indicate that poets did not write these poems on events that happened years prior, rather they wrote (or sang) them on impulse in situ. Some of the poems are conversational in which the poet pleads, begs, chides or praises the king. One such example is poem 46. The poet Kovur Kizhaar addresses the Chola king Killivalavan to save the lives of the children of a defeated enemy who are about to be executed by being trampled under an elephant. The poet says, "... O king, you belong to the heritage of kings who sliced their own flesh to save the life of a pigeon, look at these children; they are so naïve of their plight that they have stopped crying to look at the swinging trunk of the elephant in amusement. Have pity on them..." The almost impressionistic picture the poem paints cannot be anything but by someone who is witness to the events present in the poem. Many other poems also suggest that Cholas come from a heritage who sliced their own flesh to save the life of a pigeon. Such mentions make scholars debate that Cholas have claimed them selfs as the descendants of King Shibi Chakravarthy – a legendary hero who self-sacrifices his body for saving a dove's life.

The second poem by Mudinagarayar addresses the Chera king Uthayan Cheralaathan and praises him hyperbolically for his claimed feeding the armies at the mythical Kurukshetra War of the legendary Mahabharata epic.

== Historical source ==
Each Purananuru poem has a colophon attached to it giving the authorship and subject matter of the poem, the name of the king or chieftain to whom the poem relates and the occasion which called forth the eulogy are also found.

It is from these colophons and rarely from the texts of the poems themselves, that the names of many kings and chieftains and the poets patronised by them are gathered. The task of reducing these names to an ordered scheme in which the different generations of contemporaries can be marked off one another has not been easy. To add to the confusion, some historians have even denounced these colophons as later additions and untrustworthy as historical documents.

A careful study of the synchronisation between the kings, chieftains and the poets suggested by these colophons indicates that this body of literature reflects occurrences within a period of four or five continuous generations at the most, a period of 120 or 150 years. Any attempt at extracting a systematic chronology and data from these poems should take into consideration the casual nature of these poems and the wide difference between the purposes of the anthologist who collected these poems and the historian's attempts to arrive at a continuous history.

There have been unsuccessful attempts at dating the poems of Purananuru based on the mention of the Mahabharata war. A more reliable source for the period of these poems is based on the mentions one finds on the foreign trade and presence of Greek and Roman merchants in the port of Musiri (poem 343), which gives a date of between 200 BCE to 150 CE for the period of these poems. This is further strengthened by the mention of a reference to Ramayana in poem 378, and a reference to Maurya in poem 175, which indicates a late date of about 187 BCE. A combination of these two considerations would indicate a composition date range during the 2nd century BCE.

== Reference to death and rituals ==
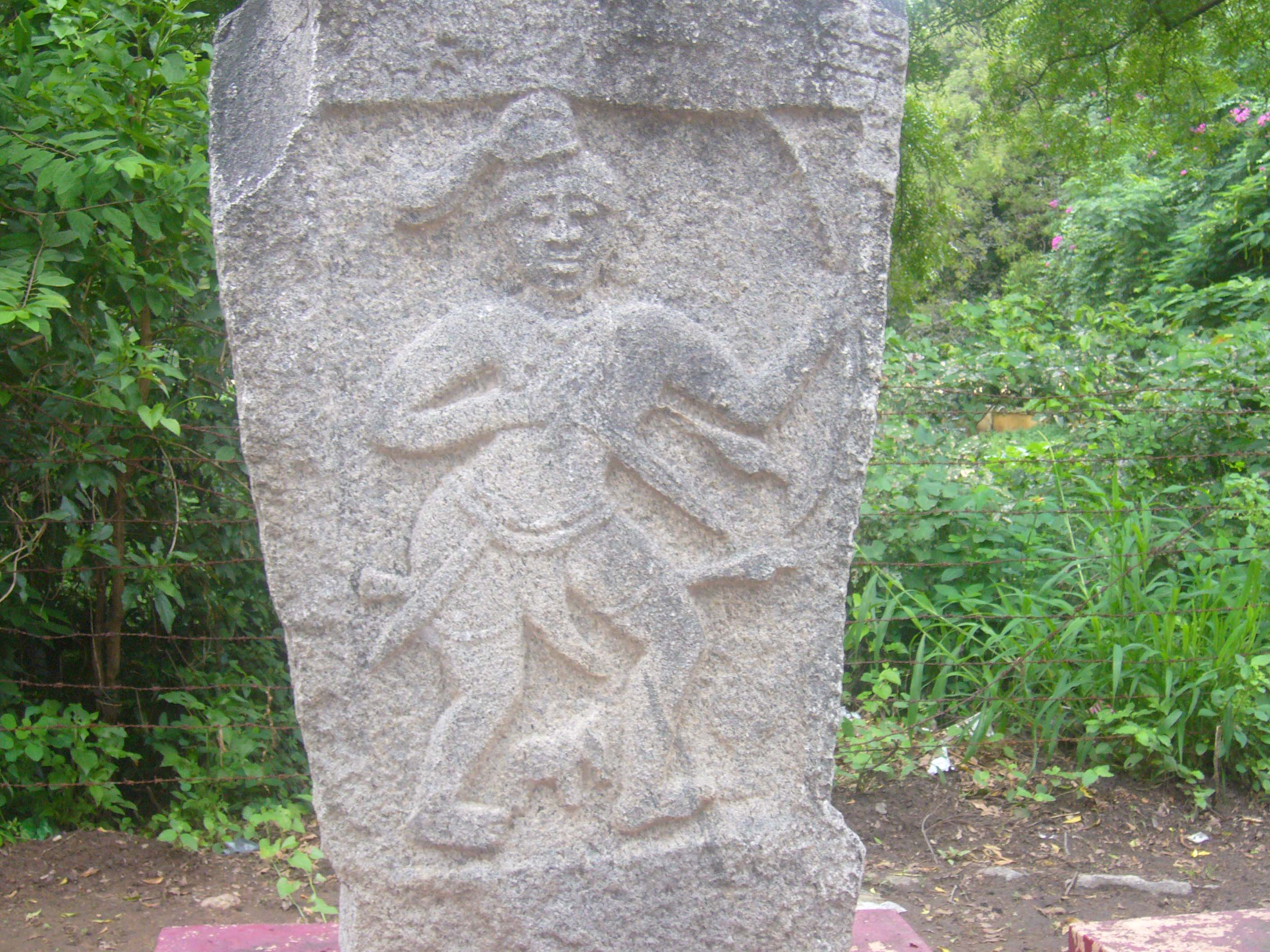
Erection of a Nadukal (hero stone) to honour fallen heroes is one of the cultural practices mentioned repeatedly in Purananuru.

According to Hart and Heifetz, several poems in Purananuru talk about the God of Death, the death of kings, the helplessness of widows, youth versus old age, memorial stones and death rituals. After the death of a king the people and poets scold the god of death who takes the life of the generous kings, women beat their breasts and their bangles break into pieces. According to several poems mention that people were commonly burnt in the cremation ground, Tamils also believed in re-birth and only good deeds would lead them to a better life in their next birth. It also claims that Indra who holds the Vajrayudam welcomes the soul of a Great king Ay Andiran as he did good deeds. There are several mentions of pinda offered to the corpse and later burnt, after all the rituals they plant a Naṭukal for the king and decorate it. Naṭukal are memorial stones dedicated to the honorable death of a hero in battle. Naṭukal has several mentions in this text and explains when was it erected. After a great King or warrior dies his body is burnt, and then they erect a hero stone for him as a memorial. Avvaiyar in poem 232 describes the Naṭukal of Athiyamān Nedumān Añci, it is decorated with peacock feathers and toddy is kept nearby.

Example: Situation in Cermeation ground

Across it spreads the jungle. Upon it thick spurge grows.
There in broad daylight the owls cry out and demon women open
their mouths wide. The cremation fires glow and clouds
of smoke cover that fearful burning ground. Hot, white
ashes on the earth littered with bones are quenched by tears
of lovers, weeping, their hearts full of longing.
It has seen the back of every human being, all the people
living in this world as they go away,
but no one has ever seen it turn its back and go away.

Purananuru poem 156 Translated by George L. Hart

== Publishing in modern times ==
U. V. Swaminatha Iyer (1855–1942) resurrected the first three epics and Sangam literature from the appalling neglect and wanton destruction of centuries. He reprinted the literature present in the palm leaf form to paper books. He published Purananuru for the first time in 1894. Ramaswami Mudaliar, a Tamil scholar, first gave him the palm leaves of Civaka Cintamani to study. Being the first time, Swaminatha Iyer had to face many difficulties in terms of interpreting, finding the missing leaves, textual errors and unfamiliar terms. He went on tiring journeys to remote villages in search of the missing manuscripts. After years of toil, he published Civaka Cintamani in book form in 1887, followed by Silappatikaram in 1892 and Purananuru in 1894. Along with the text, he added abundant commentary and explanatory notes of terms, textual variations and approaches to explaining the context.

== Samples ==
யாதும் ஊரே; யாவரும் கேளிர்;
தீதும் நன்றும் பிறர் தர வாரா;
நோதலும் தணிதலும் அவற்றோரன்ன;
சாதலும் புதுவது அன்றே; வாழ்தல்
இனிது என மகிழ்ந்தன்றும் இலமே; முனிவின்,
இன்னாது என்றலும் இலமே; 'மின்னொடு
வானம் தண் துளி தலை இ, ஆனாது
கல் பொருது இரங்கும் மல்லல் பேர் யாற்று
நீர் வழிப்படூஉம் புணை போல், ஆர் உயிர்
முறை வழிப்படூஉம்' என்பது திறவோர்
காட்சியின் தெளிந்தனம் ஆகலின், மாட்சியின்
பெரியோரை வியத்தலும் இலமே;
சிறியோரை இகழ்தல் அதனினும் இலமே.

கணியன் பூங்குன்றன், புறநானூறு, 192

The Sages To us all towns are one, all men our kin,
Life's good comes not from others' gifts, nor ill,
Man's pains and pain's relief are from within,
Death's no new thing, nor do our bosoms thrill
When joyous life seems like a luscious draught.
When grieved, we patient suffer; for, we deem
This much-praised life of ours a fragile raft
Borne down the waters of some mountain stream
That o'er huge boulders roaring seeks the plain
Tho' storms with lightning's flash from darkened skies.
Descend, the raft goes on as fates ordain.
Thus have we seen in visions of the wise!
We marvel not at the greatness of the great;
Still less despise we men of low estate.

Kaniyan Pungundranar, Purananuru, 192
(Translated by G.U.Pope, 1906)

இனி நினைந்து இரக்கம் ஆகின்று: திணி மணல்
செய்வுறு பாவைக்குக் கொய் பூத் தைஇ,
தண் கயம் ஆடும் மகளிரொடு கை பிணைந்து,
தழுவுவழித் தழீஇ, தூங்குவழித் தூங்கி,
மறை எனல் அறியா மாயம் இல் ஆயமொடு
உயர் சினை மருதத் துறை உறத் தாழ்ந்து,
நீர் நணிப் படி கோடு ஏறி, சீர் மிக,
கரையவர் மருள, திரைஅகம் பிதிர,
நெடு நீர்க் குட்டத்துத் துடுமெனப் பாய்ந்து,
குளித்து மணல் கொண்ட கல்லா இளமை
அளிதோதானே! யாண்டு உண்டு கொல்லோ
தொடித் தலை விழுத் தண்டு ஊன்றி, நடுக்குற்று,
இரும் இடை மிடைந்த சில சொல்
பெரு மூதாளரேம் ஆகிய எமக்கே?

தொடித்தலை விழுத்தண்டினார், புறநானூறு, 243

The Instability of Youth "I muse of YOUTH! the tender sadness still
returns! In sport I moulded shapes of river sand,
plucked flowers to wreathe around the mimic forms:
in the cool tank I bathed, hand linked in hand,
with little maidens, dancing as they danced!
A band of innocents, we knew no guile.
I plunged beneath th' o'erspreading myrtle's shade,
where trees that wafted fragrance lined the shore;
then I climbed the branch that overhung the stream
while those upon the bank stood wondering;
I threw the waters round, and headlong plunged
dived deep beneath the stream, and rose,
my hands filled with the sand that lay beneath!
Such was my youth unlesson'd. 'Tis too sad!
Those days of youth, ah! whither have they fled?
I now with trembling hands, grasping my staff,
panting for breath, gasp few and feeble words.
And I am worn and OLD!"

Thodithalai Vizhuthandinar, Purananuru, 243
(Translated by G. U. Pope, 1906)

..
நீயே வடபால் முனிவன் தடவினுள் தோன்றிச்
செம்பு புனைந்து இயற்றிய சேண் நெடும் புரிசை
உவரா ஈகைத் துவரை யாண்டு
நாற்பத்தொன்பது வழிமுறை வந்த
வேளிருள் வேளே விறல் போர் அண்ணல்,
தார் அணி யானைச் சேட்டு இருங்கோவே!
ஆண்கடன் உடைமையின் பாண்கடன் ஆற்றிய
ஒலியற் கண்ணிப் புலிகடிமாஅல்!
..

Excerpts of புறநானூறு 201,
பாடியவர்: கபிலர், பாடப்பட்டோன்: இருங்கோவேள்,
திணை: பாடாண், துறை: பரிசில்

..
Irunkovel "You, whose ancestors appeared out of the sacrificial fire-pit of a northern sage
who ruled Tuvarai that contained huge forts made of copper
you whose lineage goes back 49 generations
Oh king who is victorious in battles
Oh great Irunkovel! who possesses garlanded elephants
Its time to man up to you responsibilities and your duties to poets
Oh Pulikadimal wearing a thick garland!
..

Excerpts of Purananuru, 201, Poet: Kapilar, Chief who was sung: Irunkovel

== See also ==
- Eight Anthologies
- Eighteen Greater Texts
- Sangam literature
