= Rulers of the Chera dynasty =

List of rulers of the Chera dynasty

The Rulers of the Chera dynasty can be

- Rulers of early historic Chera polity
- Medieval Chera rulers
  - Chera rulers from Vanchi Karur (Karur)
  - Chera rulers from Mahodayapuram (Kodungallur)
  - Chera rulers of Thagadur (Dharmapuri)

== Rulers of early historic Chera polity ==
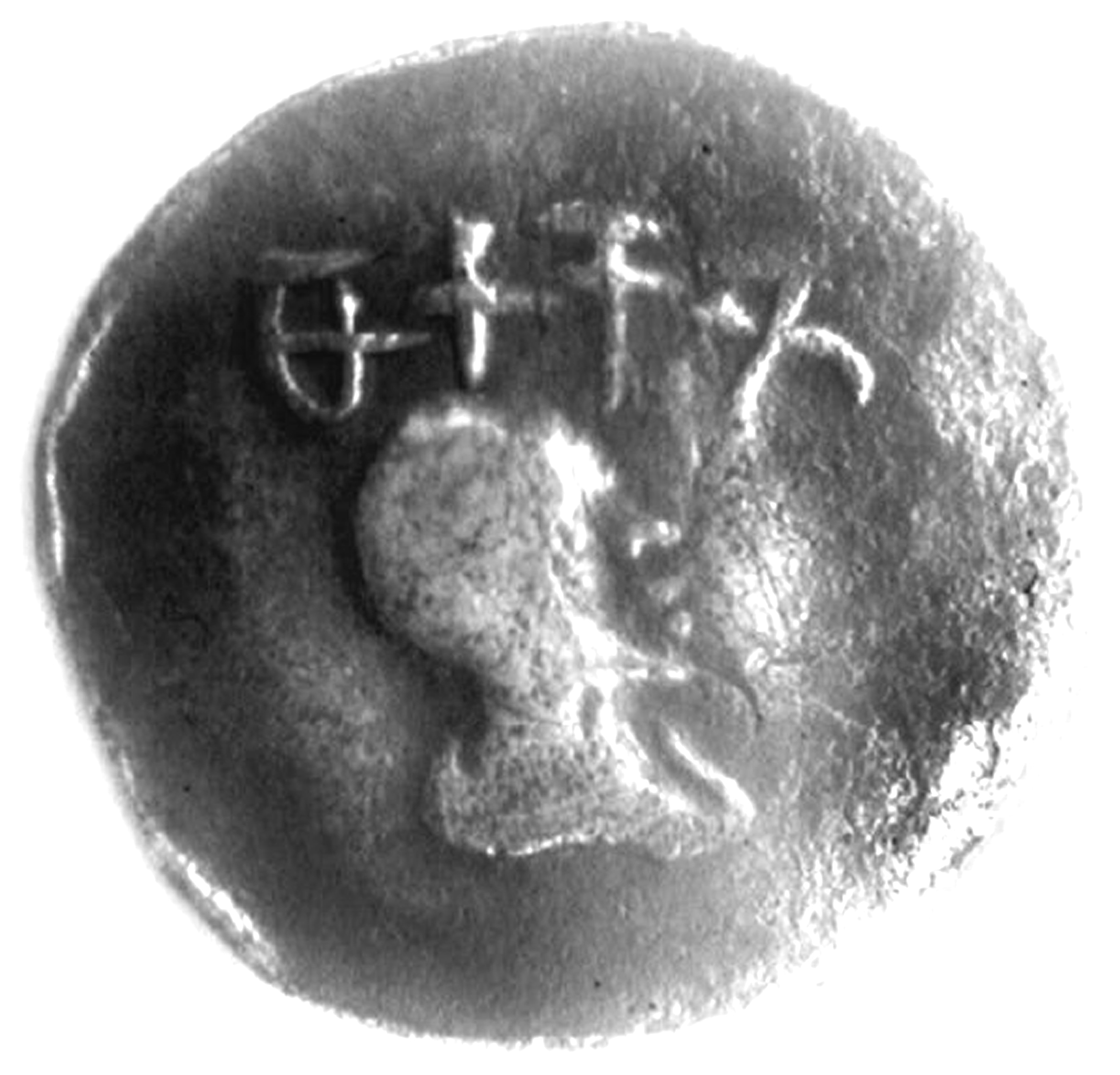
A Chera coin with legend "Makkothai"

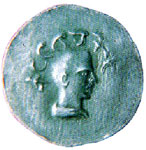
A Chera coin with legend "Kuttuvan Kothai"

=== From early historic inscriptions ===
- Ko Athan Chel Irumporai (Chelva Kadungo Vazhi Athan)
- Perum Kadungon (Perum Cheral Irumporai)
- Kadungon Ilam Kadungo (Ilam Cheral Irumporai)
- Kadummiputhra Chera
- Ko Athan (?)

=== From early historic coins ===
- Makkothai
- Kuttuvan Kothai
- Kolippurai
- Kol-Irumporaiy

=== Cheras from early Tamil poems ===
Chera rulers from the decades of Pathitrupathu Collection.

1. (missing)
2. Imayavaramban Nedum Cheral Athan
3. Palyanai Chel Kezhu Kuttuvan
4. Narmudi Cheral
5. Chenguttuvan
6. Adu Kottu Pattu Cheral Athan
7. Chelva Kadungo Vazhi Athan
8. Tagadur Erinta Perum Cheral Irumporai
9. Kudakko Ilam Cheral Irumporai
10. (missing)

Muchiri-Karur branch (around Muchiri)	Karur branch (Kongu area)	
	Clan or line name: Porai or Irumporai	
Imayavaramban Nedum Cheral Athan	Anthuvan	
Palyanai Chel Kezhu Kuttuvan	Chelva Kadungo Vazhi Athan	Ko Athan Chel Irumporai
Narmudi Cheral	Tagadur Erinta Perum Cheral Irumporai	Perum Kadungon
Chenguttuvan	Kudakko Ilam Cheral Irumporai	Kadungon Ilam Kadungo
Adu Kottu Pattu Cheral Athan		

The following Cheras are knowns other early Tamil collections (some of the names are re-duplications).

- Vanavaramban Uthiyan Cheral Athan
- Kudakko Nedum Cheral Athan
- Kadalottiya Vel Kezhu Kuttuvan
- Perum Cheral Athan
- Ko Kothai Marpan
- Cheraman Vanchan
- Anthuvan Cheral Irumporai
- "Yanaikatchai" Mantharam Cheral Irumporai
- Kanaikkal Irumporai
- Kudakko Cheral Irumporai
- Karuvur Eriya Ol-val Ko Perum Cheral Irumporai
- Palai Padiya Perum Kadungo
- Cheraman Ma Vengo
- Kuttuvan Kothai
- Kottambalathu Thunchiya Makkothai
- Kottambalathu Thunchiya Cheraman
- Kadungo Valia Athan

== Medieval Chera rulers ==
=== Chera rulers from Karur (Kongu Cheras) ===
- Ravi Goda ("Ravi")
- Kantan
- Kantan Ravi
- Kantan Vira Narayana
- Ravi Kantan "Vira Chola"
- Vira Goda
- Vira Chola Kalimurkka
- Kalimurkka Vikrama Chola
- Vira Kerala Amara Bhujanga Deva
  - Amara Bhujanga Deva
- Vira Kerala
  - Vira Kerala ("thennavar muvar")
  - "Minavan" Vira Kerala
- Kerala Kesari Adhirajaraja Deva

=== Chera rulers from Mahodayapuram (Kodungallur) ===
- Sthanu Ravi Kulasekhara
  - Kulasekhara Alvar
  - Kulasekhara Varma
- Rama Rajasekhara
  - Cheraman Perumal Nayanar
- Vijayaraga
- Goda Goda
- Kerala Kesari
- Goda Ravi
- Indu/Indesvara Goda
- Bhaskara Ravi Manukuladitya
- Ravi Goda
- Rajasimha
- Raja Raja
- Ravi Rama
  - Rama Rajaditya
- Aditya Goda Ranaditya
- Rama Kulasekhara

=== Chera rulers from Thagadur (Dharmapuri) ===
- Rajaraja Adigaman Vagan
- Rajarajadevan Vitukathazhakiya Perumal
