= Chera dynasty =

Dynasty in ancient South India

- c. 3rd century BCE–c. 5th century CE
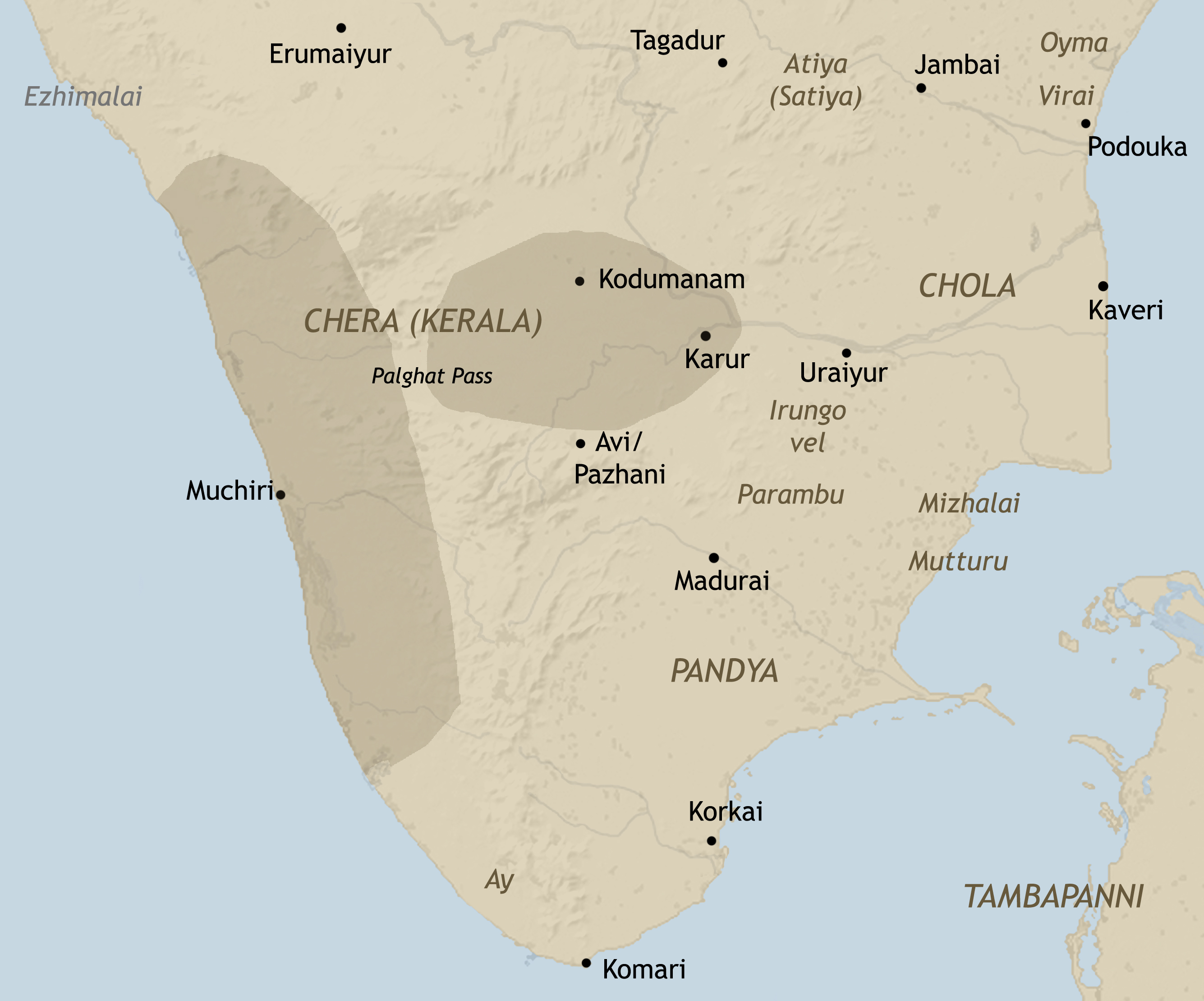
- Approximate extent of Chera influence in early historic south India (Gurukkal, 2002)
- Capital: Vanchi (Karur/Karuvur); Muchiri (Vanchi); Thondi
- Official languages: Old Tamil
- Religion: Hinduism; Jainism; Buddhism
- Government: Monarchy (rudimentary state)
- History
  - Established: c. 3rd century BCE
  - Disestablished: c. 5th century CE
- Today part of: Kerala; Tamil Nadu

The Chera dynasty (or Cēra, IPA: [t͡ʃeːɾɐ]), also known as Keralaputra, Kedalaputho, from the early historic or the Sangam period in southern India, ruled over parts of present-day states Kerala and Tamil Nadu. The Cheras, known as one of the mu-ventar (the Three Crowned Kings) of Tamilakam (the Tamil country) alongside the Cholas and Pandyas, have been documented as early as the third century BCE. The Chera country was geographically well placed at the tip of the Indian peninsula to profit from maritime trade via the extensive Indian Ocean networks. Exchange of spices, especially black pepper, with Middle Eastern or Graeco-Roman merchants is attested to in several sources. Chera influence extended over central Kerala and western Tamil Nadu until the end of the early historic period in southern India.

The Cheras of the early historical period (c. second century BCE – c. third/fifth century CE) had their capital in interior Tamil country (Vanchi-Karuvur or Karur, the Kongu country), and ports/capitals at Muchiri-Vanchi (Muziris) and Thondi (Tyndis) on the Indian Ocean coast of Kerala. They also controlled Palakkad Gap and the Noyyal River valley, the principal trade route between the Malabar Coast and eastern Tamil Nadu. The bow and arrow, or just the bow, was the traditional dynastic emblem of the Chera family.

The major pre-Pallava polities of southern India — ruled by the Cheras, Pandyas, and Cholas — appear to have displayed a rudimentary state structure. Early Tamil literature, known as the Sangam texts, and extensive classical Graeco-Roman accounts are the major sources of information about the early historic Cheras. Other corroborative sources for the Cheras include Tamil-Brahmi inscriptions, silver portrait coins with Tamil-Brahmi legends, and copper coins depicting the Chera symbols of the bow and the arrow on the reverse. With the close of the early historical period, between the third and fifth centuries CE, the Cheras witnessed a substantial decline in power.

"Kadal Pirakottiya" Chenkuttuvan, the most celebrated Chera ruler of early Tamil literature, is famous for the traditions surrounding Kannaki, the principal character of the Tamil epic poem Chilappathikaram. Several medieval dynasties, such as the Cheras of Karur (Kongu country), Satiyaputra Cheras of Thagadur, and the Chera "Perumals" of Mahodayapuram (Kerala) claimed descent from the early historic Chera rulers. The ruling lineage of the kingdom of Venad, the Kulasekharas, was also known as the "Chera dynasty".

== Etymology ==
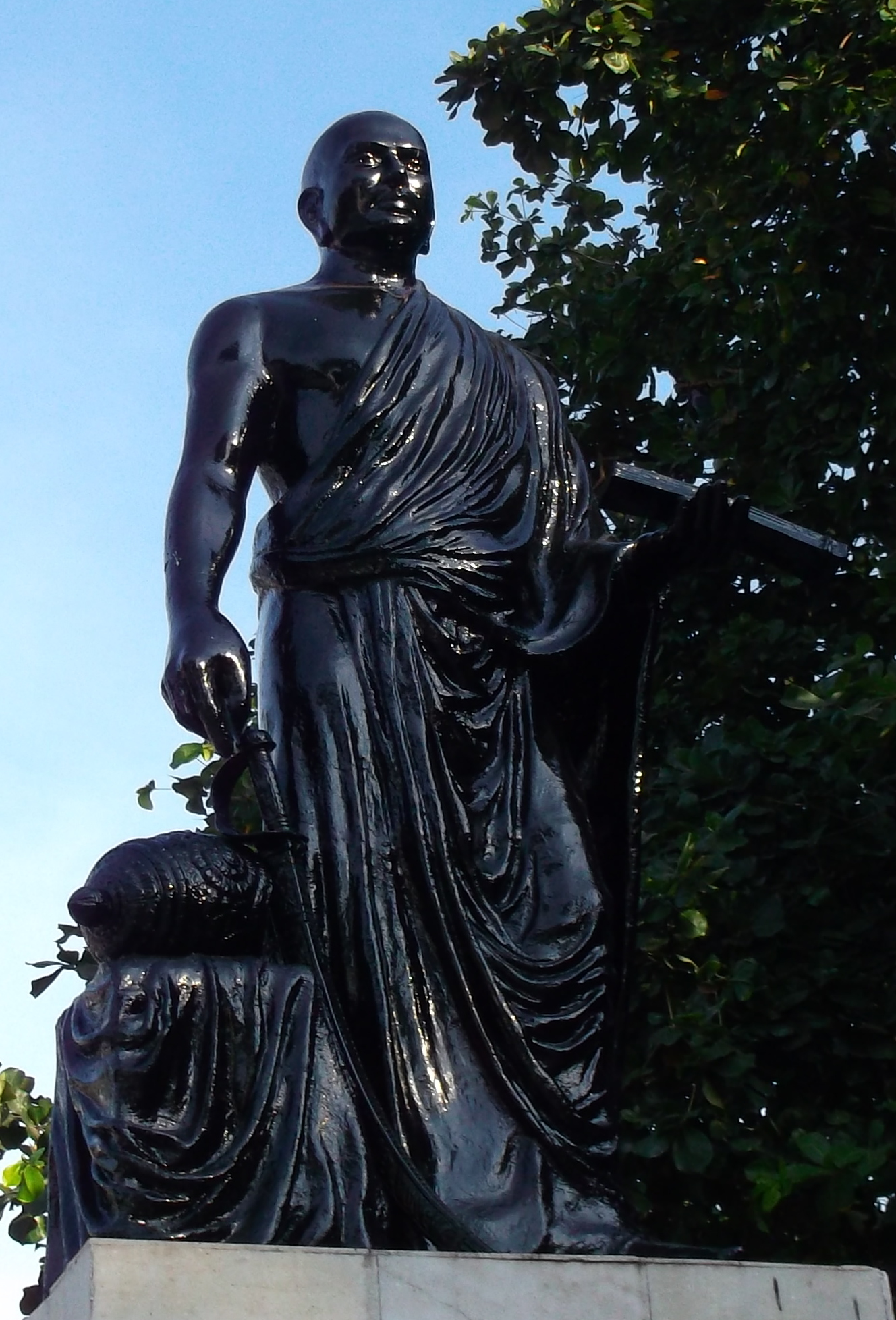
Ilango Adigal, a 2nd-century Chera prince and Jain monk, is credited with composing the Tamil epic Silappatikaram.

The Tamil title "Chera", along with its variants such as "Cheraman" and "Cheralar/Cheral", and its various Indo-Aryan equivalents like "Kedalaputho" or "Kerala", refers to the ruling dynasty or family, the people, and the geographical region(s) associated with them. The title "Cheraman" is generally believed to be a shortened form of the phrase "Cheramakan", which is also considered the original root of the phrase "Keralaputras".

The etymology of the term "Chera" remains a subject of debate among historians.

- The ancient Tamil term "Cheralam" likely means "mountain range", suggesting a connection to the mountainous geography of Kerala or the Malabar Coast.
- It has also been suggested that the word "Chera" derives from the Tamil term "cherppu", meaning "seashore" (the Malabar Coast).

A number of additional theories have also been proposed in historical studies.

It may seem that the title Chera is derived from the Malayalam word "keram" (meaning "coconut palm"). However, the term "keram" itself is believed to have originated from the name Kerala. Alternatively, some suggest that "keram" is simply a shortened form of the Sanskrit word "narikela", meaning "coconut tree".

=== Variations of the term Chera ===
The Cheras are cited in ancient non-Tamil sources under different forms of the names "Chera" or "Cheraman". For the first time, they are mentioned as "Kedalaputo" in the edicts of the Maurya emperor Asoka (third century BCE).

Pliny the Elder (1st century CE), author of Natural History, and Claudius Ptolemy (2nd century CE), the astronomer and mathematician, referred to the Cheras of southern India as "Kaelobotros" and "Kerobottros", respectively. The Periplus Maris Erythraei, an early Greek manual of sailing directions written in the 1st century CE, refers to the Cheras as "Keprobotras". These Graeco-Roman names are probably corruptions of the Indo-Aryan term "Kedala Puto/Kerala Putra".

== Sources ==
Irumporai Cheras from Pugalur inscription

Arunattarmalai, Velayudhampalayam (Pugalur)

- Athan Che[ra]l Irumporai/Irumpurai
- Perum Kadungon
- Kadungon Ilam Kadungo

— Mahadevan, I. (2003). pp. 117–119.

=== External sources ===
The Cheras are referred to as "Kedalaputo" (related to Sanskrit: "Kerala Putra") in the edicts of the Maurya emperor Asoka (third century BCE). Brief references to the Keralas occur in the works of Katyayana (c. third-to-fourth centuries BCE), the philosopher Patanjali (c. second century BCE or fifth century CE), and the Maurya statesman and philosopher Kautilya or Chanakya (c. third-to-fourth century BCE). However, the Sanskrit grammarian Panini (c. sixth-to-fifth centuries BCE) does not mention the Keralas.

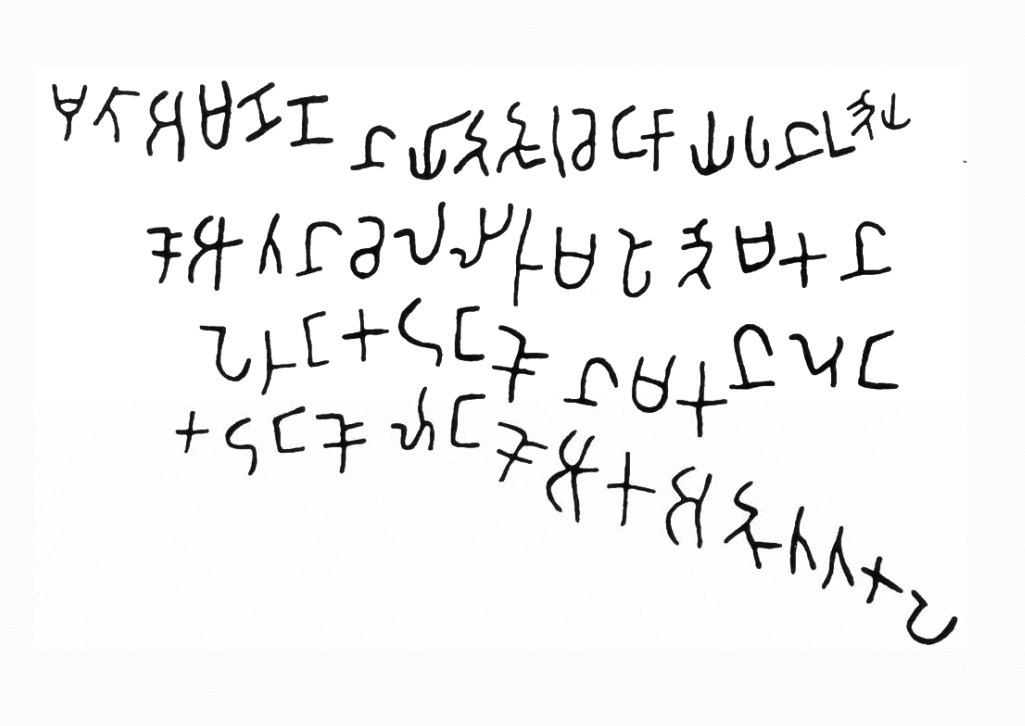
Brahmi inscription from Pugalur, near Karur, recording Chera royal grants to a Jain monk.

The earliest Graeco-Roman accounts referring to the Cheras appear in the works of Pliny the Elder (author of the celebrated Natural History) in the first century CE, in the Periplus Maris Erythraei (an early Greek manual of sailing directions, first century CE), and in the writings of Claudius Ptolemy (the astronomer-mathematician, and geographer of Greek descent who flourished in Alexandria) in the second century CE.

=== Epigraphical sources ===
Archaeologists have discovered both epigraphic and numismatic evidence for the early Cheras.

- Two almost identical Tamil-Brahmi inscriptions discovered from Pugalur near Karur (c. second century CE; Arunattarmalai, Velayudhampalayam) describe three generations of Chera rulers. They record the construction of a rock shelter for Chenkayapan, a Jain monk, on the investiture of Kadungon Ilam Kadungo, son of Perum Kadungon, and the grandson of king Athan Che[ra]l Irumporai/Irumpurai.A potsherd with the graffiti "Irumpurai" was discovered at Kumarikal Palayam, Tiruppur, in April, 2025.
- A short Tamil-Brahmi engraving containing the word Chera ("Katummi Puta Cera"; Kadummi Putra Chera) was discovered at the Edakkal Caves in the Western Ghats (c. third century CE; Wayanad). Another short graffiti from the same location (Edakkal) reads "Ko Athan", possibly referring to a different Chera ruler (c. third century CE).
- Additional Tamil-Brahmi inscriptions can be found in locations such as Kodumanal, Aiyamalai, and Arachalur.

=== Excavation at Karur and Pattanam ===
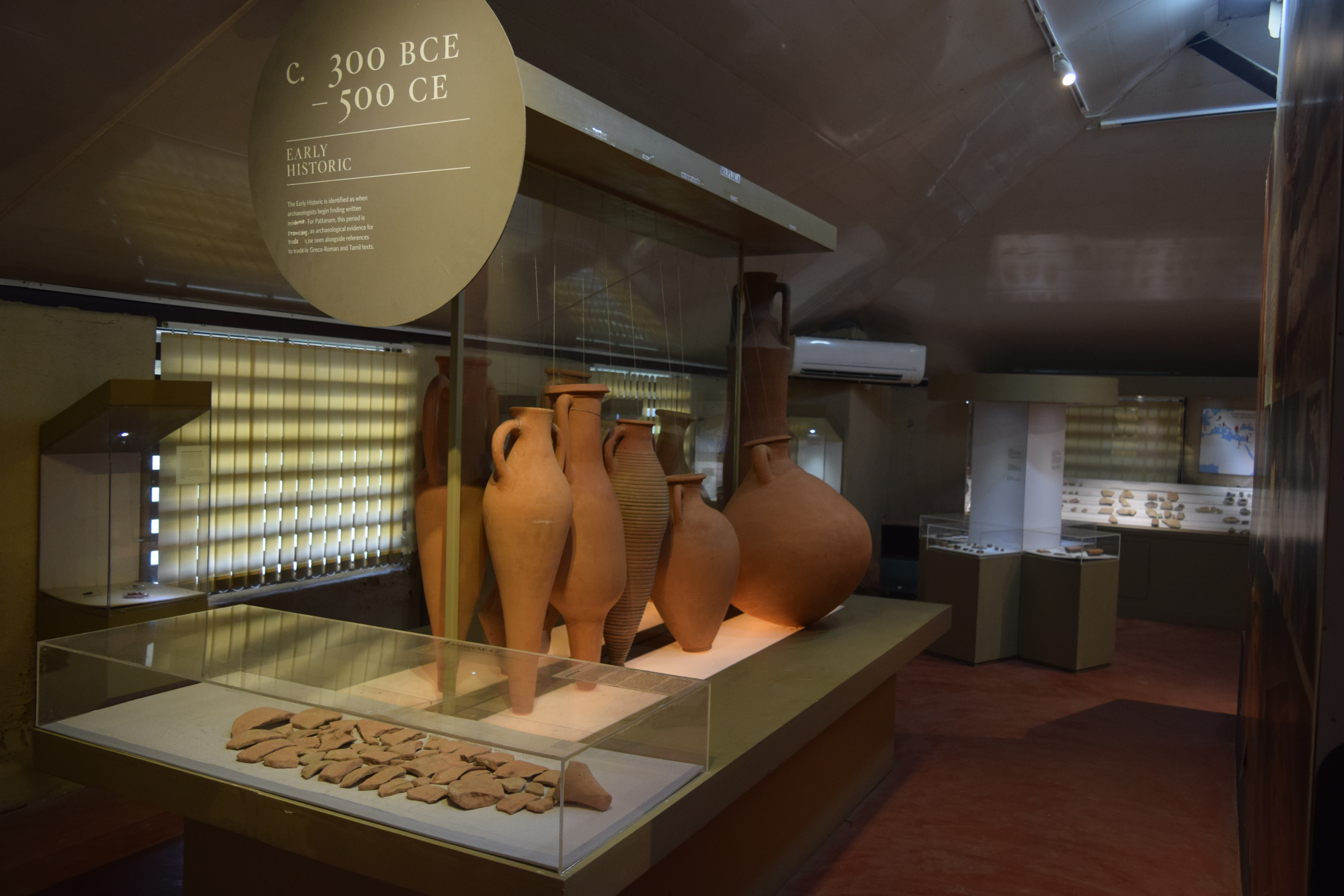
Amphorae sherds found at Pattnanam excavation site (Kerala).

Archaeological discoveries confirm modern Karur, or Vanchi/Karuvur, the early historic Chera capital on the Amaravati River, as a major political, and economic centre of ancient south India. It was an important centre of craft production, especially jewel making, and inland trade. Excavations at Karur have yielded huge quantities of copper coins with Chera symbols such as the bow and arrow, and pieces of Roman amphorae. Vellavur, near Karur, and the Amaravati river bed are noted for the presence large quantities of Roman coins. Pugalur, noted for the rare Chera donative inscription in Tamil-Brahmi, is located around 10 miles north of Karur, on the south bank of the Kaveri River. An ancient trade route, from ports such as Muchiri and Thondi on the Kerala Coast through the Palghat Gap, along the Noyyal river, through Kodumanal, to Karur in interior Tamil Nadu can also be traced using extensive archaeological evidence.

Historians have yet to precisely locate Muziris, known in Tamil as Muchiri, the foremost port in the Chera kingdom and a capital on the Malabar Coast. However, archaeological excavations at Pattanam near Kochi increasingly suggest its identification with this location. Pattanam is notable for the remains of a brick-lined wharf made of laterite granules, lime, and clay. Other discoveries include amphora sherds, terra sigillata, carnelian intaglios, and fragments of Roman glass. Roman coins have been discovered in large numbers from central Kerala and the Coimbatore-Karur region (Kottayam-Kannur, Valluvally, Iyyal, Vellalur and Kattankanni)

=== Numismatic discoveries ===
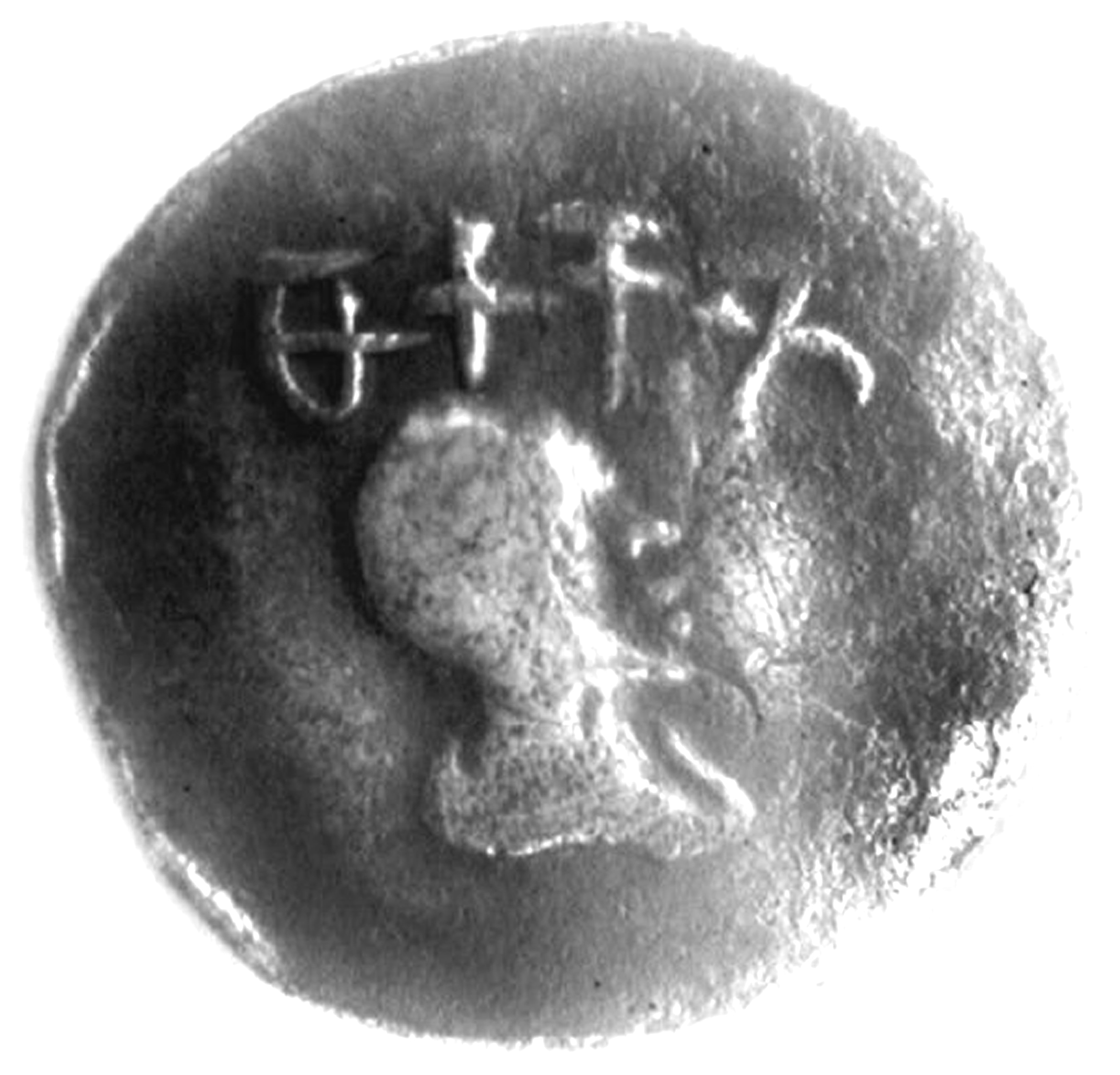
A Chera coin with legend "Makkotai"

Dynastic coins, primarily recovered from the bed of the Amaravati River in central Tamil Nadu, provide valuable historical insights into this period. Often found as surface or stray discoveries or held in private collections, these coins mainly consist of punch-marked designs. Typically square in shape and made of copper, its alloys, or silver, they frequently feature a bow and arrow—the traditional emblem of the Cheras—on the obverse, sometimes accompanied by a legend. Silver punch-marked coins, imitating imperial Maurya coins and bearing a Chera bow on the reverse, have also been reported. Bronze dies for minting punch-marked coins were discovered in the riverbed in Karur (indicating the presence of a Chera mint there). Additionally, hundreds of copper coins attributed to the Cheras have been excavated at Pattanam, Cochin, in central Kerala. It is also known that the Cheras counter-struck silver Roman coins.

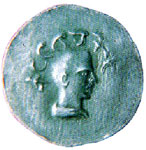
A Chera coin with legend "Kuttuvan Kotai"

Other major discoveries from central Tamil country include several silver portrait coins, such as one featuring a portrait with the Tamil-Brahmi legend "Makkotai" above it, found in the Krishna riverbed near Karur, and another with a portrait and the legend "Kuttuvan Kotai" above it. Both of these impure silver coins are tentatively dated to around the first century CE or slightly later. The reverse sides of both coins are blank. Impure silver coins bearing the Chera legends "Kollippurai"/"Kollipporai" and "Kol-Irumporai" have also been discovered at Karur. A silver coin depicting a person wearing a Roman-style bristled-crown helmet was also found in the Amaravati riverbed in Karur; its reverse side features a bow and arrow, the traditional symbol of the Chera family.

A macro analysis of the Makkotai coin reveals strong similarities to contemporary Roman silver coins, and the portrait coins are generally considered imitations of Roman coinage. The legends, representing the names or titles of Chera rulers, are typically inscribed in Tamil-Brahmi characters on the obverse, while the reverse often features a bow and arrow symbol. Evidence of an alliance between the Cheras and the Cholas is seen in a joint coin, which displays the Chola tiger on the obverse and the Chera bow and arrow on the reverse. Additionally, Lakshmi-type coins, possibly of Sri Lankan origin, have been discovered at Karur.

== Political history from Tamil sources ==
A large body of Tamil works from the c. second century BCE to third century CE, collectively known as the Sangam (Academy) Literature, describes a number of Chera, Chola, and Pandya rulers. These praise-filled poetic eulogies often glorify the rulers' accomplishments and virtues, perhaps serving to legitimize their political power.

Among these, the most important sources for the Cheras are the Pathitrupathu, the Agananuru and the Purananuru. The Pathitrupattu, the fourth book in the Ettuthokai Anthology, mentions several rulers (and possible heirs-apparents) of the Chera family. Each Chera is praised in ten songs sung by a court poet. The title Pathitrupathu indicates that there were ten texts, each consisting of a decad of lyrics; however, two of these have not yet been discovered. Additionally, the collection has not yet been worked into a connected history and settled chronology.

=== Gajabahu-Chenguttuvan synchronism ===
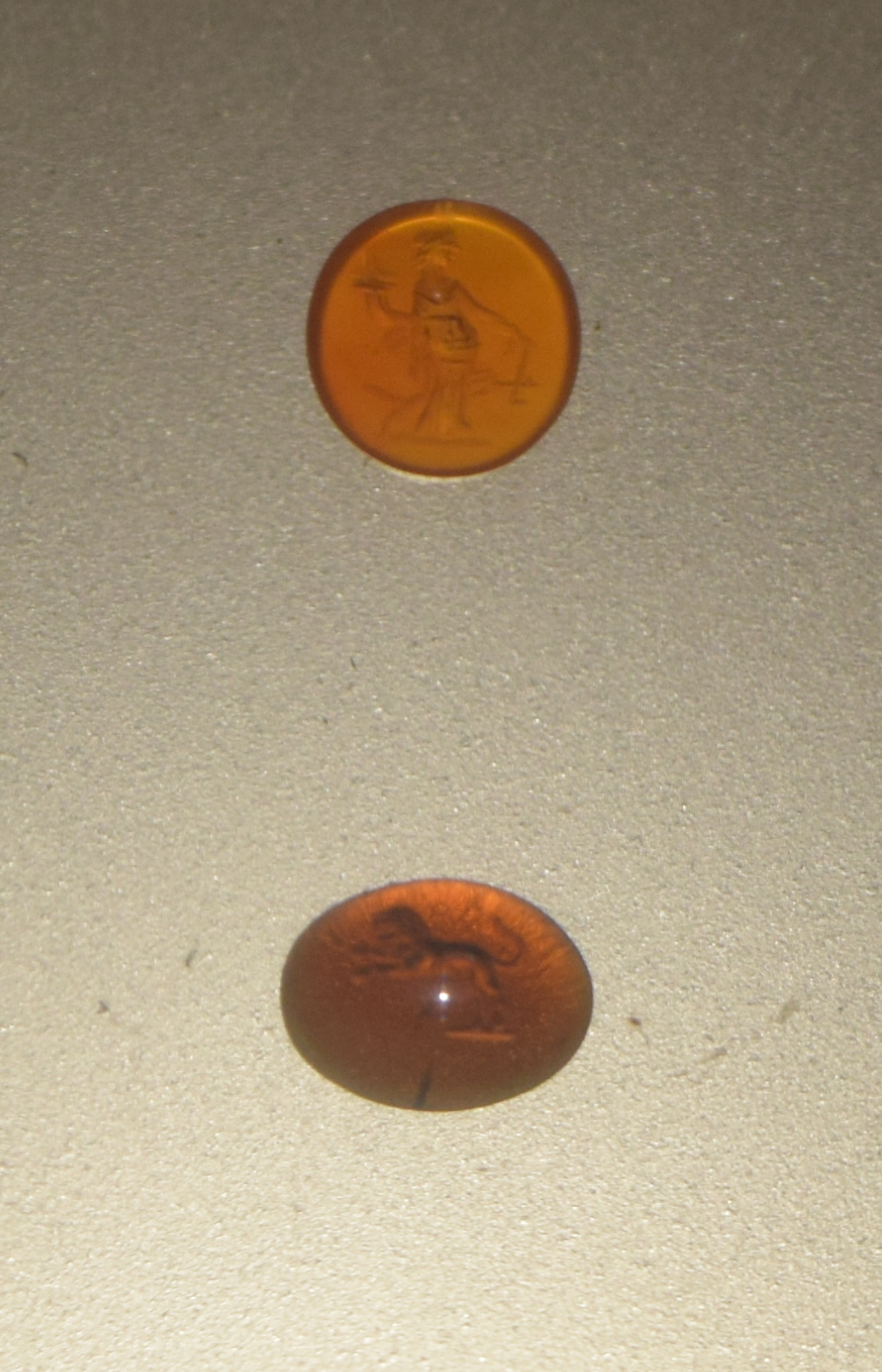
Carnelian Intaglio from Malabar Coast.

The events described in the early Tamil texts, or the Sangam Literature, are dated to around the first or second centuries CE based on the Gajabahu-Chenguttuvan synchronism, which is derived from certain verses in the Tamil epic poem Silappathikaram. Despite its reliance on a number of conjectures, this method is considered a sheet anchor for dating early historic south India. Complementary archaeological (and epigraphical) evidence broadly seems to support the Gajabahu chronology.

Ilango Adigal, the author of Silappathikaram, describes the renowned Chera ruler Chenguttuvan, a central figure in the epic, as his elder brother. He also mentions Chenguttuvan's consecration of a temple for the goddess Pattini (Kannaki) at Vanchi (the Chera capital on the Malabar Coast). According to the poem, a king named Gajabahu—identified with Gajabahu, a second-century ruler of Sri Lanka—was among those present at the Pattini temple consecration at Vanchi. Based on this context, Chenguttuvan and the other Chera rulers can be dated to either the first or the last quarter of the second century CE.

Chera rulers (Pathitrupattu Decad and Poet) from the Pathitrupattu Collection
Western Branch (Muchiri-Vanchi; central Kerala)
Uthiyan Cheralathan (c. 130 CE)
Uthiyan Cheralathan is generally considered the earliest recorded ruler of the Western Branch of the Chera family and is thought to be the possible hero of the lost first decade of the Pathitrupathu Collection. According to the Purananuru, he bore the royal title "Vanavarampan" (the Beloved of the Gods). The Purananuru and Agananuru describe him as the Chera ruler who hosted the great feast ("the Perum Chotru") for both the Pandavas and the Kauravas during the Kurukshetra War of the Mahabharata.
Nedum Cheralathan (Decad II, Kannanar) (c. 155 CE)
Nedum Cheralathan, the son of Uthiyan Cheralathan, was known by the title "Imayavarampan". He was praised for subduing "Seven Crowned Kings", earning him the renowned title "Adhiraja". Poet Kannanar extols his conquests, noting that he defeated enemies from Kumari (Cape Comorin) to the Himalaya Mountains and even carved the Chera Bow Emblem on the Himalayas.

Among his greatest adversaries was the "Kadambu" clan (based on an "island"; probably along the Malabar Coast), whom he defeated in a battle after "crossing" the sea. Nedum Cheralathan is also credited with a victory over the Yavanas — probably Graeco-Roman navigators — on the Malabar coast. He captured several of them and, as punishment, poured hot ghee on their heads. However, he later released them in exchange for a heavy ransom consisting of diamonds, other precious stones, and intricately crafted vessels.

Nedum Cheralathan is sometimes identified with "Kudakko" Nedum Cheralathan, who was killed in battle against a Chola ruler.

Palyanai Chel Kelu Kuttuvan (Decad III, Palai Kauthamanar) (c. 155 - 165 CE)
Palyanai Chel Kelu Kuttuvan, the son of Uthiyan Cheralathan (and younger brother of Nedum Cheralathan), is credited with conquering "Kongar Nadu" (the country of the Kongar people, corresponding to the Kongu country; western Tamil Nadu). He is also described as the Lord of Puzhi Nadu, the Cheruppu, and the Aiyirai Hills.

Sources also mention that his headquarters was located at the mouth of the present-day Periyar River on the Malabar Coast.

"Kalankaikanni" Narmudi Cheral (Decad IV, Kappiyattukku Kappiyanar) (c. 180 - 190 CE)
Narmudi Cheral, the son of Nedum Cheralathan, is remembered for leading an expedition against Neduman Anji, the Adigaiman/Satyaputra chieftain of Thagadur (Dharmapuri, in northern Tamil Nadu).

He also defeated and killed Nannan, the ruler of Ezhimala, in the battle of "Kadambin Peruvayil" (or "Vakai Perunthurai").

"Kadal Pirakottiya" Chenguttuvan (Decad V, Paranar) (c. 180 CE)
"Kadal Pirakottiya" Chenguttuvan is identified with "Kadalottiya" Vel Kelu Kuttuvan. He was a son of Nedum Cheralathan.

During his reign, the Chera territory encompassed the Malabar Coast (present-day Kerala) and the interior Kongu country (western Tamil Nadu). He is described as the Lord of the Kudavar people (that is, of Kudanadu) and as the Kuttuvan (the Lord of the Kuttuvar people)

Chenguttuvan successfully intervened in a succession dispute in the Chola kingdom, placing his relative Killi on the Chola throne. Killi's rivals were defeated in the battle of "Vayil or "Neri-Vayil". Records also mention that he won a major victory at "Viyalur" (perhaps in the Ezhimala country of northern Kerala, against its traditional ruler Nannan). The panegyric to the fifth decade describes Chenkuttuvan as "the king feared by the northerners", who wanted to take a sacred stone for the idol of the goddess Pattini. He also destroyed Kodukur, likely located in the Kongu country, and is also said to have slain an "Arya king" (to obtain stone for the idol of the goddess Kannaki).

Chenguttuvan is prominently mentioned in the Chilappathikaram, the Tamil epic poem composed by Ilanko Adikal.

"Adu Kottu Pattu" Cheralathan (Decad VI, Kakkai Padiniyar Nachellaiyar) (c. 180 - 190 CE)
"Adu Kottu Pattu" Cheralathan, a son of Nedum Cheralathan and brother of Narmudi Cheral, succeeded "Kadal Pirakottiya" Chenguttuvan.

He is said to have controlled the port of Naravu (in northern Kerala; on the Malabar Coast). He is probably identical with the Perum Cheralathan who fought against the Chola ruler Karikala at the battle of Venni. In this battle, Cheralathan was wounded on the back by Karikala. Unable to endure the disgrace, he committed ritual suicide through slow starvation.

Irumporai or Porai Branch (Vanchi-Karuvur; western Tamil Nadu)
Chelva Kadumko Vali Athan (Decad VII, Kapilar) (c. 165 CE)
Chelva Kadumko Vali Athan, the son of Chera ruler Anthuvan Cheral, is recorded as having controlled the port of Pandar (on the Malabar Coast) and the settlement of Kodumanam (present-day Kodumanal). He defeated the combined armies of the Pandyas and the Cholas. He was the father of Perum Cheral Irumporai and is said to have died at a place called Chikkar Palli.

He is identified with Ko "Athan Che[ra]l Irumporai" mentioned in the Pugalur inscriptions (c. 2nd century CE).

Perum Cheral Irumporai (Decad VIII, Arichil Kizhar) (c. 190 CE)
Perum Cheral Irumporai is renowned for his conquest of the fortified city of Thagadur (present-day Dharmapuri), the stronghold of the Adigaiman-Satyaputra ruler Ezhini/Neduman Anji (who was aided by the Chola and Pandya rulers).

In the later battle of Pazhi, the warriors of Nannan, the ruler of Ezhimala, defeated Neduman Anji, who had previously invaded Nannan's territory on behalf of Perum Cheral Irumporai. Perum Cheral Irumporai is described as "the lord of Puzhi", "the lord of Kolli Hills" and "the Lord of [Poom]Puhar". He is sometimes honored with the title "Kothai Marpa". He was the father of Illam Cheral Irumporai.

He is identified with "Perum Kadungon" mentioned in the Pugalur inscriptions (c. 2nd century CE).

Kudakko Illam Cheral Irumporai (Decad IX, Perunkundur Kizhar) (c. 190 - 215 CE)
"Kudakko" Illam Cheral Irumporai, son of Perum Cheral Irumporai, is said to have defeated the Chola ruler Perum Chola, along Ilam Pazhaiyan Maran and Vicchi, and to have destroyed "five forts". He was known as "Kudakko" or "Lord of the West", as well as "Lord of Thondi", and was described as the master of "Kongar Nadu", "Kuttuvar Nadu", and "Puzhi Nadu".

He is also recorded as a descendant of Nedum Cheralathan.

He is identified with "Kadungon Ilam Kadungo" mentioned in the Pugalur inscriptions (c. 2nd century CE).

Apart from the Chera rulers known from the Pathitrupattu, many more are mentioned in other early Tamil collections, such as the Purananuru. However, some of these names are re-duplications.

"Karuvur Eriya" Ol-val Ko Perum Cheral Irumporai is recorded as ruling from the city of Karuvur (present-day Karur, Tamil Nadu). He was praised by the poet Nariveruttalaiyar. Another ruler is "Kadungo" Valia Athan, while certain "Palai Padiya" Perum Kadungo is also mentioned. Anthuvan Cheral Irumporai (c. 140 CE), the father of Chelva Kadumko Vali Athan (of the seventh decade), is another figure of importance. He was a contemporary of the Chola ruler "Mudittalai" Ko Perunar Killi, whose royal elephant famously wandered into the city of Karuvur.

"Yanaikatchai" Mantharam Cheral Irumporai (c. 215 CE) ruled a vast territory, stretching from the Kolli Hills (near Karur Vanchi) in the east to the ports of Thondi and Mantai on the western coast (central Kerala). He defeated his enemies in a battle at Vilamkil. However, he was later captured by the famous Pandya ruler "Thalaiyalanganam" Nedum Chezhian II (early 3rd century CE), though he managed to escape captivity and successfully regain his lost territories.

Other rulers mentioned include Ko "Kothai Marpa", "Thagdur Erinta" Perum Cheral Irumporai, and Kuttuvan Kodai. "Kudakko" Nedum Cheral Athan and Perum Cheral Athan are also listed. Another notable figure is Kanaikkal Irumporai, who is said to have defeated a chief named "Muvan" and imprisoned him. In an act of brutality, Kanaikkal pulled out the teeth of his prisoner and planted them on the gates of the city of Thondi (on the Malabar Coast). Later, when captured by the Chola ruler Chengannan, Kanaikkal committed suicide by starvation. "Kudakko" Cheral Irumporai is also recorded, along with "Kottambalattu Tunchiya" Makkodai, who is probably identical with the "Kottambalattu Tunchiya" Cheraman mentioned in Akananuru (168). Vanchan and "Kadalottiya" Vel Kelu Kuttuvan are further notable names in the tradition. Finally, Man Venko is remembered as a friend of both the Pandya ruler Ugra Peruvaluti and the Chola ruler "Rajasuyam Vetta" Perunar Killi.

== Geographical extent ==
Recent studies on early historic south Indian history suggest that the three major Tamil rulers – the Pandya, the Chera and the Chola – were customarily based in Madurai, Vanchi-Karuvur (Karur) and Uraiyur (Tiruchirappalli), respectively, in present-day Tamil Nadu. Although these early kingdoms may have emerged in river plains with abundant agricultural resources — such as those of the Tamraparni, Vaigai, and Kaveri rivers — they also established major ports/capitals on the Indian Ocean at Korkai, Muchiri-Vanchi (Muziris), and Puhar (Kaveripumpattinam) respectively.

The Chera country of the early historical (pre-Pallava) period consisted of present-day central Kerala and western Tamil Nadu (the Kongu country). Multiple branches of the Chera family ruled simultaneously in central Kerala, with Muchiri-Vanchi and Thondi as their two regional headquarters—both also being important ports on the Indian Ocean—and in the Kongu country (the Irumporai/Porai branch), with Vanchi-Karur as their capital, an important political and economic center. These collateral branches likely competed for the leadership of the Chera country. The southern tip of Kerala was controlled by the minor Ay dynasty, while the Ezhimala rulers controlled the northern Kerala.

== State formation ==
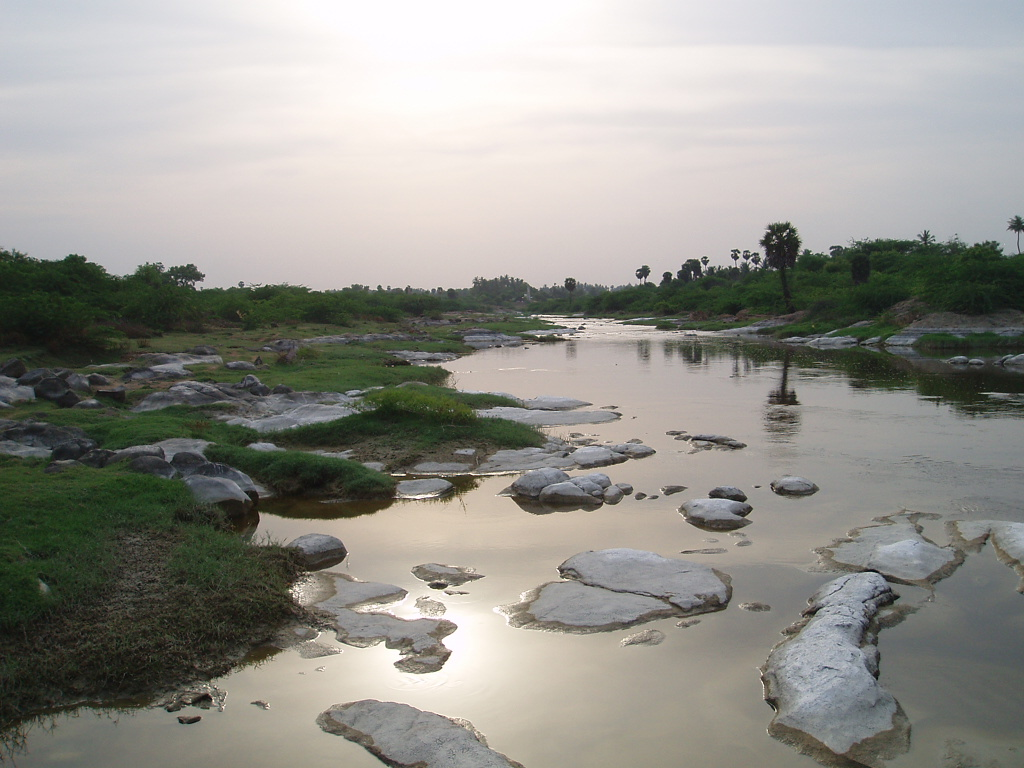
Noyyal River

The nature of political organization in pre-Pallava (early historic) southern India remains a subject of active debate among scholars and historians. A major point of contention is the interpretation of early Tamil poems (or the Sangam Literature) alongside archaeological (and numismatic) evidence. A balanced perspective indicates that the existence of at least a rudimentary state structure in early historic south India cannot be denied.

A school of academics/scholars argues that developments in early historic south India occurred within the framework of a state polity. Supporting this perspective is the presence of Tamil-Brahmi inscriptions, dynastic coin issues (numismatic evidence), refined old Tamil poems (the Sangam Literature), urban centers such as Madurai and Vanchi-Karur (urbanization), specialized crafts, and long-distance trade, particularly maritime commerce. Evidence of differential access to and control over resources can be found in poetic references to rulers bestowing expensive gifts, such as gold coins and precious stones. The traditional rulers were major consumers of luxury goods acquired through Indian Ocean spice trade. They also developed key trading ports, such as Muchiri and Korkai, and imposed rudimentary tolls and customs duties. The Pugalur inscriptions notably refer to the Chera king as "Ko", while princes carried the suffixes "Ko" or "Kon" in their names. Additionally, references to an "investiture ceremony" for the Chera heir apparent perhaps highlight the structured nature of succession.

At the top of the political hierarchy of early historic south India were the three "Crowned Kings", or the Vendars (the Chera, Chola, and Pandya), each distinguished by their royal insignias and emblems of power. Lesser rulers, known as "Velir" chieftains, were likely required to pay tribute to the Vendars. Violent conflicts were a common feature of early historic south Indian politics, as kings and chieftains frequently formed alliances and waged battles against one another.

However, this view is sometimes questioned by scholars such as R. Champakalakshmi. They argue that urbanization in early historic south India did not occur within the framework of a state polity. Instead, this period was characterized by tribal chiefdoms (or, at most, "potential monarchies"). The Vendar rulers exercised only limited control over the rice cultivating agricultural plains and relied primarily on tribute and plunder for their sustenance. There was no regular or extensive system of taxation, nor was there a centralized coercive authority. Political organization was based on communal resource ownership, with production structured around kinship ties. Authority was maintained through various redistributive social relationships, supported by the "predatory accumulation of resources". Here, kinship-based chiefdoms operating on a redistributive system formed the economic structure of ancient south India. Subsistence was largely agro-pastoral, and politics was driven by competition and conflict.

This school of scholars deliberately applies the terms "chiefs" and "chiefdoms" to denote the early historic or pre-Pallava Tamil rulers (the Chera, Chola, and Pandya) and the Tamil polities of south India, respectively.

== Society and culture ==
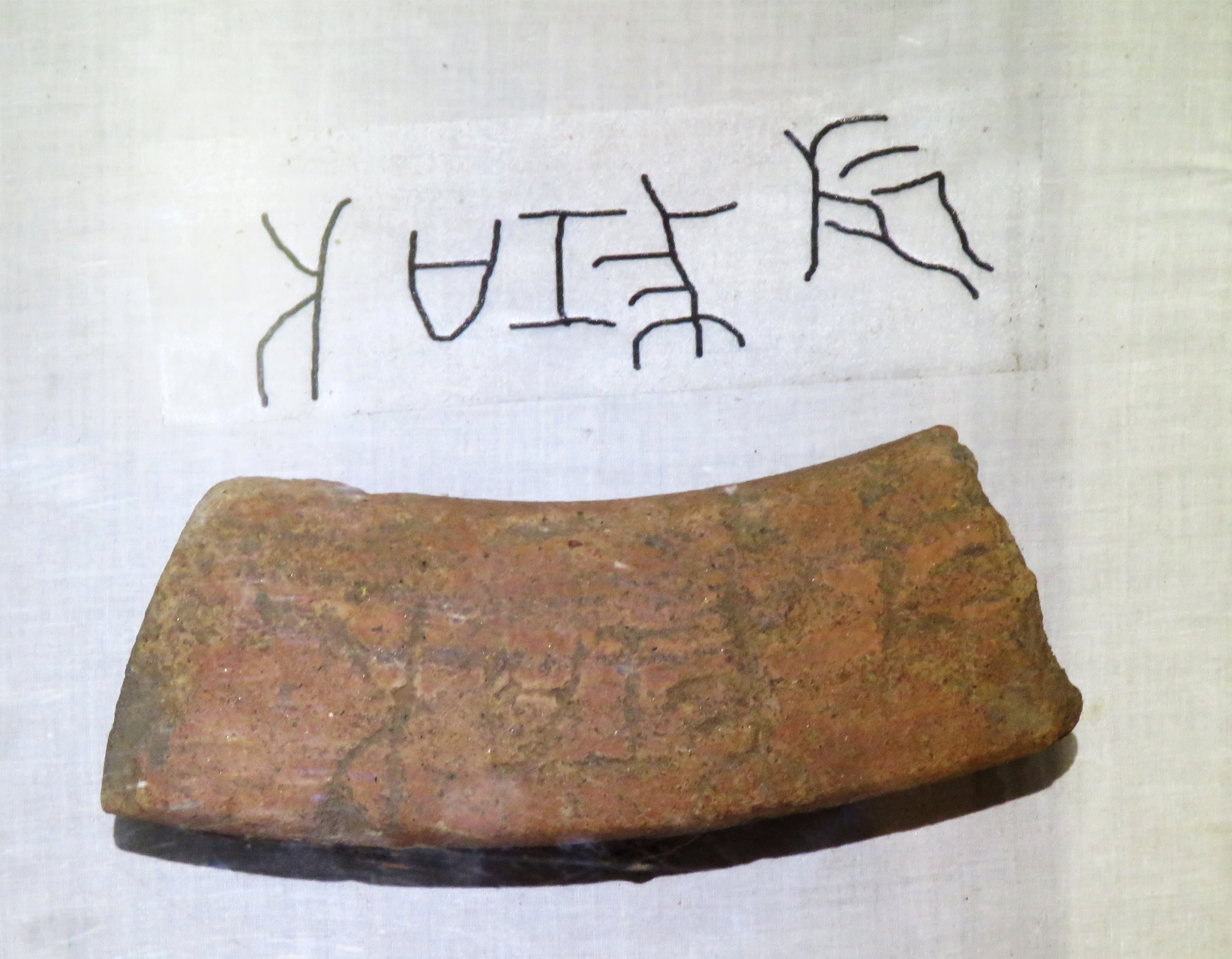
Brahmi Inscription (with graffiti "sramana"), Pattanam

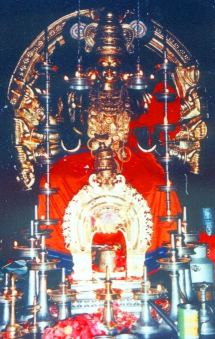
Kodungallur Bhagavathy

The early Tamil texts, or Sangam literature, reflect a society with unique cultural traditions. The surviving Sangam poems often celebrate themes of war and love. The Puram poems praise the valor and generosity of rulers, while the Akam poems express human emotions through associations with specific geographical landscapes.

In general, the literature reflect the southern Indian cultural tradition and some elements of the northern Indian cultural tradition, which by then was coming into contact with the south. Most of the Chera population, like the rest of the Tamil country, probably followed native Dravidian belief systems. Notable was the belief in Ananku, the sacred forces inhabiting various objects, including humans. It was controlled through the performance of specific rites and rituals. Ananku was also believed to manifest in women, with the notion that in chaste women, it remained controlled and possessed auspicious potential. Certain communities were tasked with performing the rites and rituals needed to regulate the ananku. The worship of departed heroes was common in the Tamil country, along with tree worship and different kinds of ancestor worship. The war goddess Korravai was perhaps propitiated with elaborate offerings of meat and toddy. Korravai was later assimilated into the present-day goddess Durga.

Early migrations from northern India brought Jain and Buddhist influences to the southern regions around the 3rd century BCE. While indigenous practices remained the primary tradition for the majority of the population, a smaller segment consisting primarily of migrant communities adhered to Jainism, Buddhism, and Brahmanism.

The varna classification had limited relevance in early Tamil society. The jati system was also not characteristic of this society, especially as reflected in the restrictions on inter-dining and social interaction. However, early Tamil texts refer to a "kudi"-based social classification in early historic south Indian society. The kudis were clan-based descent groups, linked to production and associated with lineage and hereditary occupations.

In the early historic southern India, women were probably accorded high status (in comparison to the medieval period, in southern India), and poets, bards and musicians were held in high regard in society. Early Tamil texts include several references about the lavish patronage of court poets. Professional poets of all genders composed texts praising their patron rulers, for which they were generously rewarded. It is assumed the institution of "sabha" in south-Indian villages for local administration began during the early historic period.

== Economy ==
The Sangam poems indicate that agriculture, fishing, and cattle rearing were widespread in ancient Tamil society. They also highlight the significance of Indian Ocean maritime trade and the practice of iron forging. The initial phase of urbanization in southern India, and the Chera country, is typically linked to the period from the 3rd century BCE to the 3rd century CE.

Some scholars argue that this urbanization was not driven by socio-economic changes but was instead stimulated by external trade. However, historians sometimes find this view difficult to accept, as trade cannot be regarded as an independent factor, separate from socio-economic processes.

=== Spice trade ===
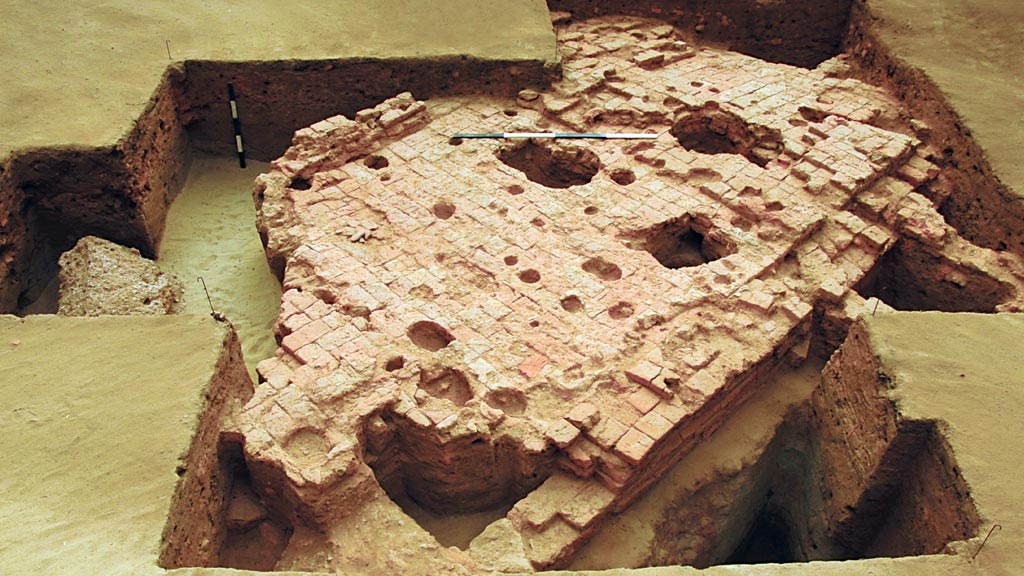
Pattanam archaeological excavations

Mediterranean/Middle East to India Route

Trading relations with merchants from Graeco-Roman world, or the Yavanas, and with northern India provided considerable economic momentum for southern India; the main economic activity was trade across the Indian Ocean. The earliest Graeco-Roman accounts referring to the Cheras are by Pliny the Elder in the first century, in the first-century text Periplus Maris Erythraei, and by Claudius Ptolemy in the second century. The Periplus Maris Erythraei portrays the trade in the territory of Cheras or "Keprobotras" in detail. The port of Muziris, or Muchiri in Tamil, located in the Chera country, was the most-important centre in the Malabar Coast, which according to the Periplus "abounded with large ships of Romans, Arabs and Greeks". Bulk spices, ivory, timber, pearls and gems were exported from Chera country, and southern India, to the Middle East/Mediterranean regions.

Geographical advantages, such as favorable monsoon winds that carried ships directly from Arabia to south India, the abundance of exotic spices in the interior Ghat Mountains and the many rivers connecting the Ghats with the Arabian Sea allowed the Cheras to become a major power in ancient southern India. Trading in spices and other commodities with Middle Eastern/Mediterranean Graeco-Roman navigators was perhaps extant before beginning of the Common Era and was consolidated in the first century CE. In the first century, the Romans conquered Egypt, which probably helped them gain dominance in the Indian Ocean spice trade.

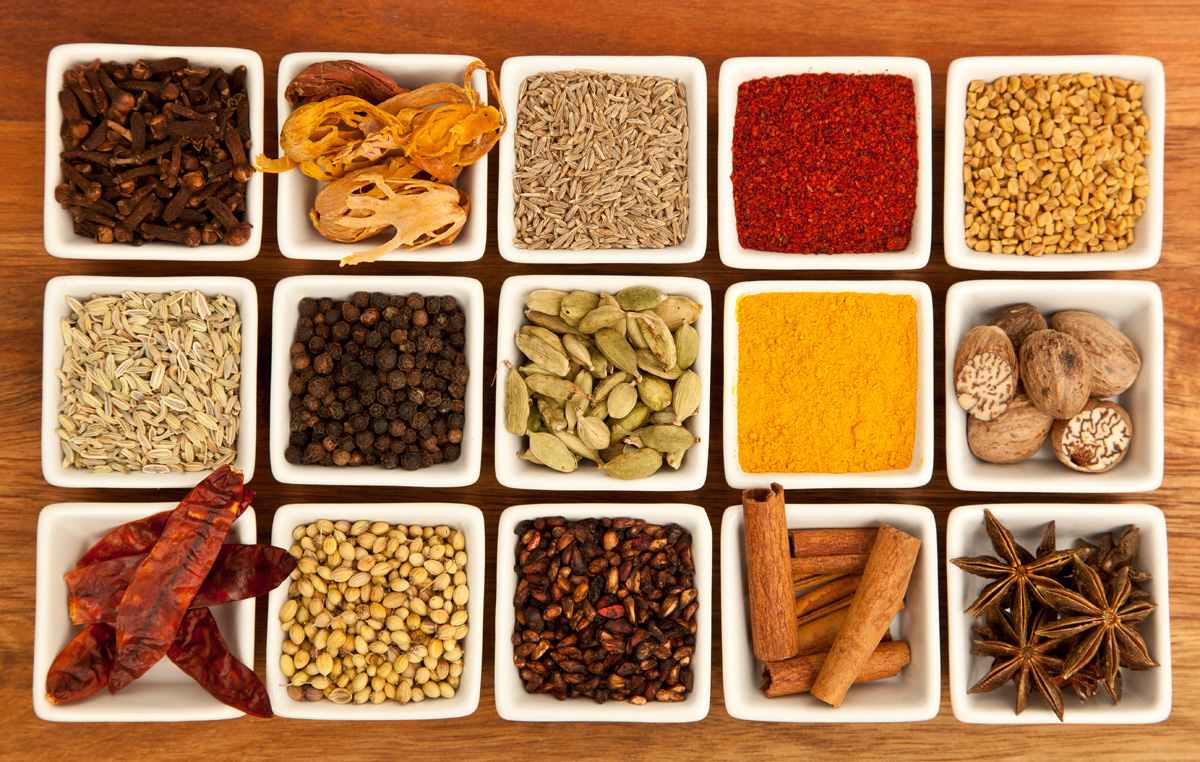
Indian Spices

The Graeco-Romans brought vast amounts of gold in exchange for commodities such as black pepper. The Roman coin hoards that have been found in Kerala and Tamil Nadu provide evidence of this trade. The first-century writer Pliny the Elder lamented "the drain of Roman gold into India and China" for luxuries such as spices, silk and muslin. The Indian Ocean spice trade dwindled with the decline of the Roman empire in the third and fourth centuries, and they were replaced by Chinese and Arab/Middle Eastern navigators.

The nature of the spice trade between the ancient Chera country, and southern India, and the Middle East/Mediterranean regions is disputed. It remains uncertain whether this trade with the Mediterranean world was conducted on equal terms by local rulers and merchants, such as the Cheras and Pandyas. However, early Tamil poems record that these rulers were consumers of luxury goods associated with the Indian Ocean spice trade. They were also involved in long-distance maritime trade, likely by developing ports and imposing rudimentary tolls and customs duties.

=== Iron technology ===
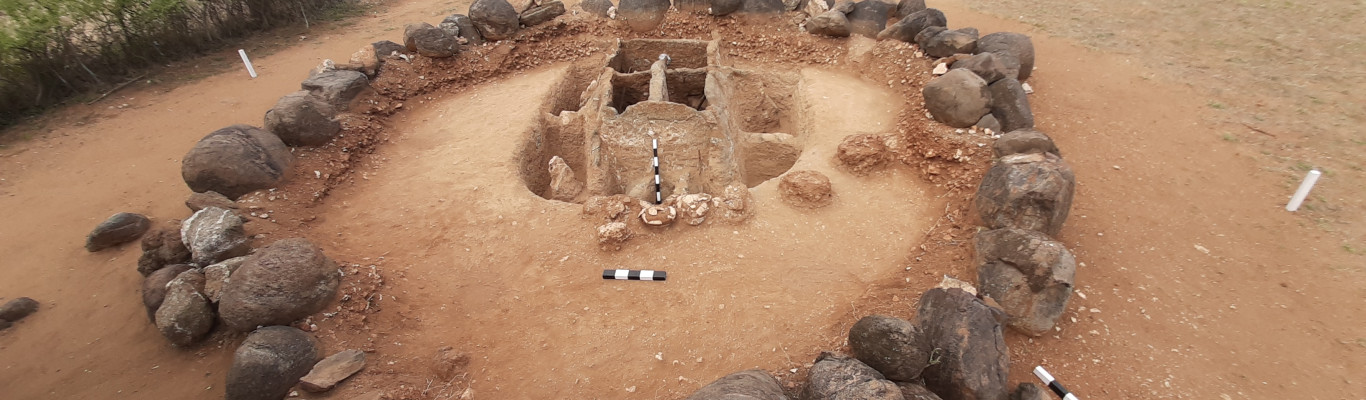
Archaeological excavation, Kodumanal

There are several ancient Tamil, Greek and Roman literary references to high-carbon steel from South Asia. The crucible steel production process probably started in the sixth century BCE in southern India (as evidenced from Kodumanal in Tamil Nadu, Golconda in Telangana, and Karnataka) and Sri Lanka. The Romans called this steel "the finest steel in the world" and referred to it as "Seric". It was perhaps exported to the Middle East/Mediterranean world by c. early 5th century BC.

The steel was exported as cakes of steely iron that were known as "wootz". Wootz steel was produced by heating black magnetite ore in the presence of carbon in a sealed clay crucible inside a charcoal furnace to completely remove slag. An alternative was to smelt the ore to give wrought iron, then heat and hammer it to remove slag. The carbon source was probably bamboo trees and leaves from plants such as avārai (Senna auriculata). The Chinese and Sri Lankans perhaps adopted the production methods of wootz steel from the south Indians by the fifth century BCE.

In Sri Lanka, this early steel-making method employed a unique wind furnace that was driven by the monsoon winds. Production sites from early historic period have been found at Anuradhapura, Tissamaharama and Samanalawewa, as well as imported iron and steel artefacts from Kodumanal in southern India. A c. 2nd century BC Tamil trade guild in Tissamaharama, in the south-east of Sri Lanka, transported some of the oldest iron and steel artefacts and production processes to the island from early historic southern India.

== Legacy ==
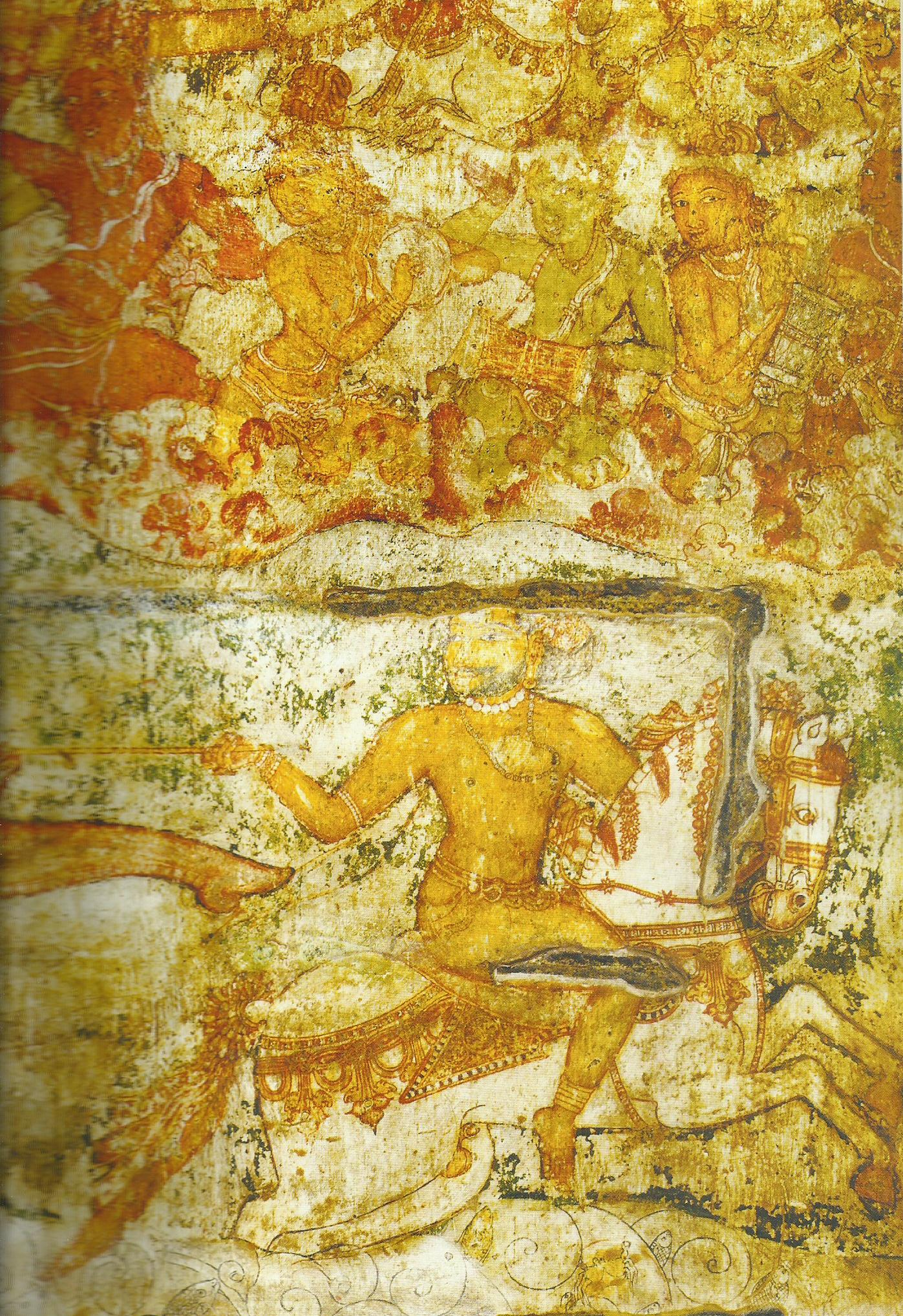
Depiction of Cherman Perumal Nayanar (Brihadisvara Temple, Thanjavur)

After about the fifth century, the influence of the Cheras appears to have declined significantly compared to the early historic period. Comparatively little is known about the Cheras during this time. The Cheras ruling at Vanchi-Karur (present-day Karur) in the Kongu country (western Tamil Nadu), also called the "Keralas", seems to have dominated the former Chera territories, including present-day Kerala, in this period.

The region subsequently experienced the rise of the Kalabhras, followed by Chalukya or Pallava-Pandya domination, and later the ascendancy of the Rashtrakutas and the Cholas. By around the ninth century CE, central Kerala appears to have separated from the larger "Chera/Kerala kingdom" to form the "medieval Chera kingdom of Kerala" (Mahodayapuram). The medieval Cheras maintained a fluctuating relationship with the neighbouring Cholas and Pandyas, alternating between alliance and conflict. In the early eleventh century CE, the Cholas attacked and eventually forced the Chera kingdom into submission, primarily to break its monopoly on the Indian Ocean spice trade (especially pepper) with the Middle East. When the Chera kingdom in Kerala was dissolved in the early 12th century, most of its constituent chiefdoms became independent.

Scholars often identify the Alvar saint Kulasekhara and the Nayanar saint Cherman Perumal (literally "the Chera king") with some of the earliest medieval Chera rulers of Kerala. During this period, the port of Kollam (later Quilon) emerged as a major hub of Indian Ocean trade with the Middle East and Southeast Asia. The Cheras, along with the Pandyas, also made extensive use of the Vattezhuthu script.

It is also recorded that in the late 12th century AD, the Satiyaputra Kerala or Adigaman Chera rulers governed Thagadur (Dharmapuri) in northern Tamil Nadu under the Chola authority. In southern Kerala, the ruling lineage of Venad — the Kulasekharas — was likewise known as the "Chera dynasty" from the 12th century onwards.

== See also ==
- Chola dynasty
- Pandya dynasty
- Pallava dynasty

| Timeline and cultural period | Indus plain (Punjab-Sapta Sindhu-Gujarat) | Gangetic Plain | | | Central India | Southern India |
| Timeline and cultural period | Indus plain (Punjab-Sapta Sindhu-Gujarat) | Upper Gangetic Plain (Ganga-Yamuna doab) | Middle Gangetic Plain | Lower Gangetic Plain | Central India | Southern India |
IRON AGE
| Culture | Late Vedic Period | Late Vedic Period; Painted Grey Ware culture | Late Vedic Period; Northern Black Polished Ware | | Pre-history | |
| 6th century BCE | Gandhara | Kuru-Panchala | Magadha | | Adivasi (tribes) | Assaka |
| Culture | Persian-Greek influences | "Second Urbanisation"; Rise of Shramana movements Jainism - Buddhism - Ājīvika - Yoga | | | Pre-history | |
| 5th century BCE | (Persian conquests) | | Shaishunaga dynasty | | Adivasi (tribes) | Assaka |
| 4th century BCE | (Greek conquests) | Nanda empire | | | | |
HISTORICAL AGE
| Culture | Spread of Buddhism | | | | Pre-history | |
| 3rd century BCE | Maurya Empire | | | | | Satavahana dynasty Sangam period (300 BCE – 200 CE); Early Cholas; Early Pandyan kingdom Cheras |
| Culture | Preclassical Hinduism (Note: Michaels (2004) p.39) - "Hindu Synthesis" (Note: Hiltebeitel (2002)) (ca. 200 BCE - 300 CE) (Note: Michaels (2004) p.39) (Note: Hiltebeitel (2002)); Epics - Puranas - Ramayana - Mahabharata - Bhagavad Gita - Brahma Sutras - Smarta Tradition; Mahayana Buddhism | | | | | |
| 2nd century BCE | Indo-Greek Kingdom | | Shunga Empire; Maha-Meghavahana Dynasty | | | Satavahana dynasty Sangam period (300 BCE – 200 CE); Early Cholas; Early Pandyan kingdom Cheras |
| 1st century BCE | Indo-Greek Kingdom | | Shunga Empire; Maha-Meghavahana Dynasty | | | Satavahana dynasty Sangam period (300 BCE – 200 CE); Early Cholas; Early Pandyan kingdom Cheras |
| 1st century CE | Indo-Scythians; Indo-Parthians | | Kuninda Kingdom | | | Satavahana dynasty Sangam period (300 BCE – 200 CE); Early Cholas; Early Pandyan kingdom Cheras |
| 2nd century | Kushan Empire | | | | | Satavahana dynasty Sangam period (300 BCE – 200 CE); Early Cholas; Early Pandyan kingdom Cheras |
| 3rd century | Kushano-Sasanian Kingdom; Western Satraps | Kushan Empire | | Kamarupa kingdom | Adivasi (tribes) | Satavahana dynasty Sangam period (300 BCE – 200 CE); Early Cholas; Early Pandyan kingdom Cheras |
| Culture | "Golden Age of Hinduism"(ca. CE 320-650) (Note: Michaels (2004) p.40); Puranas - Kural; Co-existence of Hinduism and Buddhism | | | | | |
| 4th century | Kidarites | Gupta Empire; Varman dynasty | | | | Andhra Ikshvakus; Kalabhra dynasty Kadamba Dynasty; Western Ganga Dynasty |
| 5th century | Hephthalite Empire | Alchon Huns | | | | Vishnukundina; Kalabhra dynasty |
| 6th century | Nezak Huns; Kabul Shahi; Maitraka | | | | Adivasi (tribes) | Vishnukundina; Badami Chalukyas; Kalabhra dynasty |
| Culture | Late-Classical Hinduism (ca. CE 650-1100) (Note: Michaels (2004) p.41); Advaita Vedanta - Tantra; Decline of Buddhism in India | | | | | |
| 7th century | Indo-Sassanids | | Vakataka dynasty Empire of Harsha | Mlechchha dynasty | Adivasi (tribes) | Badami Chalukyas; Eastern Chalukyas; Pandyan kingdom (revival); Pallava |
| 7th century | Karkota dynasty | | | | Adivasi (tribes) | |
| 8th century | Kabul Shahi | Pala Empire | | | Adivasi (tribes) | Eastern Chalukyas; Pandyan kingdom Kalachuri |
| 9th century | Gurjara-Pratihara | | | | Adivasi (tribes) | Rashtrakuta Empire; Eastern Chalukyas; Pandyan kingdom Medieval Cholas; Chera Perumals of Makkotai |
| 10th century | Ghaznavids | | | Pala dynasty Kamboja-Pala dynasty | Adivasi (tribes) | Kalyani Chalukyas; Eastern Chalukyas; Medieval Cholas; Chera Perumals of Makkotai; Rashtrakuta |
References and sources for table References Sources: Flood, Gavin D. (1996), An Introduction to Hinduism, Cambridge University Press; Hiltebeitel, Alf (2002), Hinduism. In: Joseph Kitagawa, "The Religious Traditions of Asia: Religion, History, and Culture", Routledge; Michaels, Axel (2004), Hinduism. Past and present, Princeton, New Jersey: Princeton University Press
