= Melemangalam =

Village in Tamil Nadu, India

Melamangalam is a big village in Sivagangai situated near to Okkur. Melamangalam is a village where people of many religions live and has the Church, Temples and Mosque. It is a village more than 300 families live in communion with the brethren.
