= Okkur =

Coordinates: 9°56′39″N 78°30′58″E

Okkur is a village in Sivagangai District, Tamil Nadu, India. The village has a history of over 2000 years. The poet Okkur Maasathiyar wrote of this village during the Sangam period in PuraNanooru. Maasthiyar's memorial tower is located in the village.

== Demographics ==
As per Ministry of Home Affairs, Directorate of Census Operations - Tamil Nadu, Census - 2001, Okkur had a population of 20270. Males constitute 51% of the population and females 49%. Okkur has an average literacy rate of 73.05%, which is higher than the national average of 59.5%. In Okkur, 13.5% of the population is under 6 years of age. The nearest villages of Karungapatti, Melamangalam, O.Pudur, Kulakkattapatti, Piravaloor, Keelapoongudi have hundreds of skilled workers working for middle east, far east countries, Singapore, Malaysia, American continent. Okkur is the native place of Actor, Director, Politician "Ramarajan".

== History ==
The history of Okkur extends back more than 2000 years. This Village was a battle field in Sangam period. Okkur Maasathiyar, a female poet, lived here and she mentioned this village in Puranaanuru. Her poem (poem Number 279 ) describes a brave, courageous mother.

This village is the headquarters of the AAroor vattagai Nadu (now called as AAru kootai nadu). Theivathiru Alagarsamy Ambalam ruled this AAru kootai nadu, a part of Sivagangai zamin, in the 19th century.

== Poem ==
In the chapters on the puRam ( புறம்) topics, the heroism of people in general, and women in particular, occupied a key place. The following is the description of the valour of a woman who lost her brother on the first day and her husband on the second. She dresses up her only son, gives him the spear and sends him to the battle on the third day after hearing the sounds of the bugle:

மேனாள் உற்ற செருவிற்கு இவள் தன்னை யானை எறிந்து களத்து ஒழிந்தனனே நெருநல் உற்ற செருவிற்கு இவள் கொழுநன் பொருநரை விலங்கி ஆண்டுப்பட்டனனே இன்றும், செருப்பறை கேட்டு விருப்புற்று முயங்கி வேல்கைக் கொடுத்து வெளிது விரித்து உடிஇப் பாறுமயிர்க் குடுமி எண்ணெய் நீவி ஒருமகன் அல்லது இல்லோள் செருமுகம் நோக்கிச் செல்கென விடுமே. (புறம், 279)

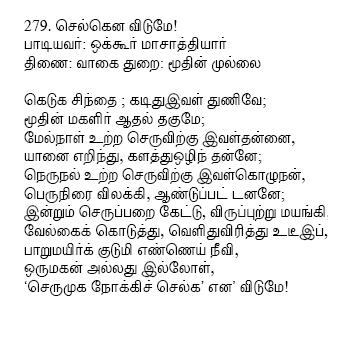
Poem 279

George L. Hart translated purananuru in English.
Book Name:"Four Hundred Songs of War and Wisdom: An Anthology of Poems from Classical Tamil, the Purananuru"

== Economy ==
The economy of the village is primarily agricultural. Some villagers work abroad in places such as Dubai (U.A.E), Kuwait, Qatar, Saudi Arabia, Singapore and Malaysia. But most of them are skilled labors. Some people (<1%) are in good position in these countries. Only a few locals have emigrated to the United States and Europe.
