= Mantharan Cheral Irumporai =

- Yanai Katchai

Chera ruler
- Reign: c. 215 CE or c.141 CE
- House: Chera dynasty

Mantharan Cheral Irumporai (Tamil: மாந்தரன் சேரல் இரும்பொறை, title "Yanai Katchai", fl. c. 215 CE) was a ruler of the Chera dynasty in early historic south India (c. 1st - 4th century CE).

He was a member of the Irumporai/Porai line, a collateral branch of the Chera family, which had its headquarters at Karuvur (Karur) in the interior Tamil country. He is also described as the ruler of Thondi (on the Malabar Coast), the "land the mountain fence protects", and the king of Kuda Nadu.

Mantharan Cheral was a contemporary of the Pandya ruler Nedum Chezhian II (early 3rd century CE). His death was famously portended by a falling star, possibly a comet or meteor.

== Quotes ==
"You protect your vast battle camp feared by your enemies, where young elephants stand tied to their posts, their trunks swaying, with high-stepping strides and ripples of bells, lifted tusks, foreheads like crescent moons, enraged stares, wide feet, huge necks, fragrant musth swarmed by humming

bees as though they are mountains with honey flowing from broken honeycombs, their big heads oozing pus as men with no swords sleep beside them in the shade of a white umbrella hung with garlands like the moon in the sky that emits rays. Roofs are thatched with beautiful sugarcanes and spears of red paddy, splendid as if it were a festival field, a huge, noisy place, where the sounds of pestles are heard and angry warriors perform kuravai dances, wearing fresh thumpai garlands, their golden petals braided with the fronds of tall and swaying palmyra, the uproar as loud as the ocean. O killer king! O ruler of Kolli Mountain! O protector of warriors! You satisfy families of those who come to you, with the tributes that enemy kings bring to you.

O king Chēy who desires victorious! Your glances are like that of an elephant! May you live long, O greatness! O strong king! You have endless wealth and you give without keeping it for yourself so that the eloquent tongues that sang your praises do not have to go to others and sing their praises. I heard that the country protected by Māntharancheral Irumporai is like the world of celestials, and I have come happily to see it. Without tiring, your army stays in other countries. Because you never rest, there is abundant rice in your country."

— Purananuru - 22

"To remove the anguish to Vilangil town,

where women wearing bright bangles play on

verandas of mansions with glittering gems that awe eyes, that are on the long stretches of sand spread like pearls from mature shells, you took to battle with your fast horses and elephants. O Poraiyan! If I sing your praises in full, it will be too long. If I sing in short, I will miss much. Those like me with bewildered hearts cannot sing your glory in full. This is the huge world in which we are born, and we cannot live hating it. We heard you say, “If only Kapilan were alive today, he whose fame was radiant and knowledge immense, he with eloquent tongue, could produce perfect verses in an instant and how wonderful that would be!” Yet, I will sing suitably of your might in battle and how you overwhelmed your enemies."

— Purananuru - 53

== Career ==
Mantharan Cheral is portrayed as a warring ruler in the early Tamil literature (the Sangam Literature). He was hailed as "Yanai Katchai", meaning 'the One with an Eye-sight Like an Elephant'.

In a battle of against the Pandya ruler Nedum Chezhian, Mantharan Cheral was defeated and taken captive. He was brought to the Pandya capital, Madurai. After his court trial there, he was imprisoned in a fort "inside a bamboo forest surrounded by the crocodile lake". The Chera later escaped, "unaided by strength and stratagem", returned to his country and "continued to rule his loving people in peace, plenty and harmony for many more uninterrupted years".

Mantharan Cheral is said to have won a victory at location known as "Vilankil" (Puram 53). In another battle against the Pandya ruler "Rajasuyamvetta" Perunnarkilli, Mantharan Cheral was again defeated (Puram 125).

== Death ==
The poet Kudalur Kizhar, who was present at the death of Mandaran Cheral, states that the king's death was foreshadowed by a falling star (possibly a comet or meteor) seven days prior to the event.

"...after a bright falling star - with a leg erupting backward, appeared in the sky, amidst the Adu (Aries) constellation, from the first leg of a Karthikai starday - past midnight, through to the Anusham starday in the first fortnight of the month of Pankuni (Phalguna), neither moving north nor east, staying aput in solitude as an island, with the North star wandering, the Mulam star rising opposite and passing above it, and the Mrikasirisham star staying low over the port of Thondi, on the seventh day Mantharan Cheral Irumporai died suddenly..."

The brightly visible meteor, which appeared during the months of March and April, might have been Halley's Comet of February–April 141 CE (under Aries across Phalguna).

== Quotes from Purananuru ==
- Purananuru: 20-22
- Purananuru: 229
- Purananuru: 229
- Purananuru: 0,22,32,53 & 229
- Purananuru: 20-22 & 53
- .Purananuru: 20-22
