= Tyndis =

Ancient Indian seaport/harbor-town mentioned in the Graeco-Roman writings

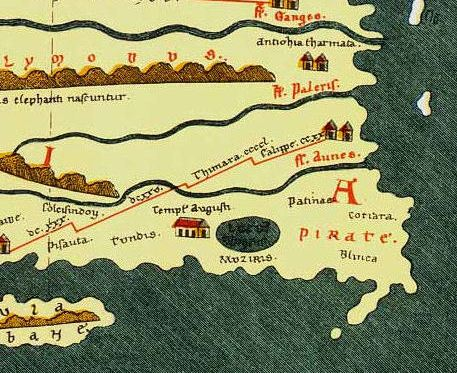
Tondis on Peutinger Table (north of "Templ Augusti" and "Lacus Muziris")

Tyndis (Ancient Greek: Τύνδις, Tamil: Thondi) was an ancient south Indian seaport and harbor-town mentioned in Graeco-Roman writings. It was located about 500 stadia north of the port Muziris (Muchiri), in the country of the Chera rulers. No archaeological evidence of Tyndis has been found.

The Chera rulers of early historic south India (c. 2nd century BCE - c. 3rd century CE) had their headquarters at Vanchi-Karur (Karuvur) in the interior Tamil Nadu and headquarters or ports at Muziris (Vanchi or Muchiri) and Tyndis (Thondi) on the Malabar Coast (present-day Kerala). Early Tamil poems (the Sangam Literature) contain several references to a port named "Thondi" on the Kerala coast in Chera country.

Another town named Thondi, located in the Pandya country on the eastern coast of the peninsula, is also mentioned in early Tamil literature. This town continues to exist under the same name.

== Different variations of the name ==
In Tamil, the term "Thondi" refers to either "a small bay-like landscape" or to the "navel".

Thondi, like Virai or Arikamedu-Virampattinam, is occasionally referred to as "Munthurai", meaning "the port in front [of the town]". It is also called "Kanalam Thondi", meaning "the coastal town with backwater lakes or backwaters with flowers". Tamil poems notably describe it as "valam kezhu", signifying its prosperity, similar to that of Muchiri.

The port of Thondi also had an ananku goddess.

- Periplus of the Erythraean Sea - Tyndis
- Pliny the Elder (Natural History) - Tyndis
- Peutinger Table - Tondis
- Claudius Ptolemy (Geography) - Tyndis

== Sources ==
=== Graeco-Roman descriptions ===
- Periplus of the Erythraean Sea (c. 1st century CE), 54-56, mentions Tyndis as a "village by plain sight from the sea":
  - "Naura and Tyndis, the first ports of trade of Limyrike"
  - "Tyndis, a well known village on the coast, is in the kingdom of Keprobotos..."
  - Tyndis was situated 500 stadia (~92 km) north to Muziris "by river and sea" (meaning the distance included river travel).
- Pliny the Elder (1st century CE) - "the Caelobothras ruled a kingdom extending to Tyndis (on the north-west)".
- By the time Claudius Ptolemy (2nd century) wrote, Tyndis had grown large enough for him to describe it (Geography 7.1.8) as a "town" or "polis".
- The Tabula Peutingeriana locates "Tondis" north of Muziris (north of "Templ Augusti" and "Lacus Muziris").

=== Early Tamil poems ===
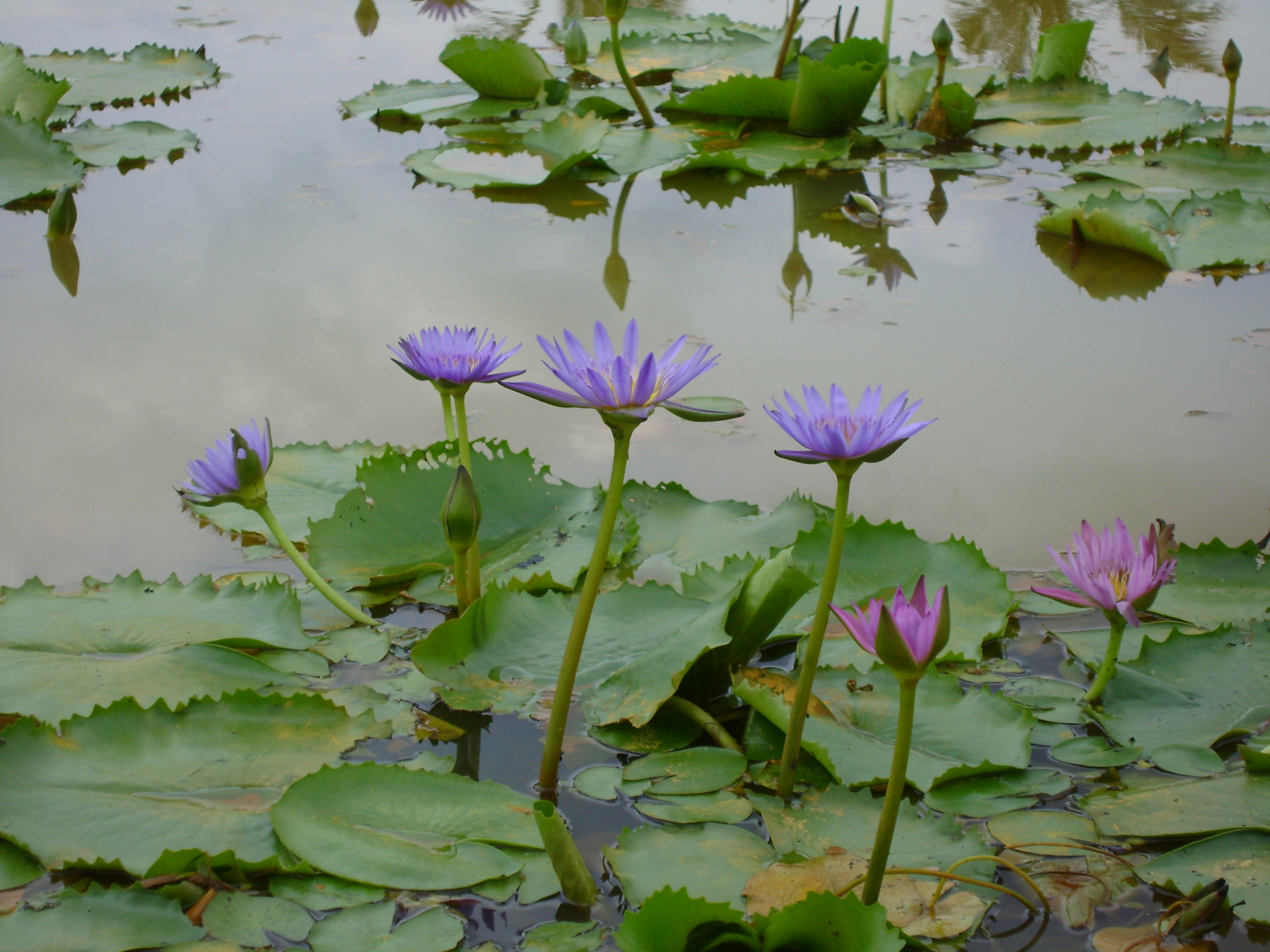
Thondi is described as having backwater lakes with water lily or neythal flowers.

There are several references to a port named Thondi on the Kerala coast in the early Tamil texts (the Sangam Literature). It was under the control of the Chera rulers, probably under the Irumporai collateral branch. The port may have been associated with hinterland trade from the Malabar Coast to the interior Tamil country via the Palghat Gap.

The Chera ruler of Thondi was usually called "Poraiyan". One Chera ruler, notably styled "Thin Ther Poraiyan" or "the Poraiyan with the Strong Chariot", is repeatedly mentioned in early Tamil literature. On some occasions, Chera ruler of Thondi is directly named as "Chenkol Kuttuvan" or Cheraman Ko Kothai Marpan. Early Tamil poems also refer to a palace of the Chera ruler at Thondi. According to these poems, the Chera fixed the tooth of his enemy chieftain "Muvan" on the palace gate. The Chera ruler of Thondi appears to have commanded a contingent of Marava warriors and owned several elephants. He distributed coins to bards and poets and, on one occasion, gifted varudai (mountain) goats from the Deccan region (?) to Brahmin priests.

There is mention of extensive rice or paddy cultivation in the fields in and around Thondi, which is described as a "coastal town" with "backwater lakes" or "backwaters filled with flowers". Early poems also hint at the presence of nearby coconut groves and hills. Thondi was also noted for its fishing and its "neythal" (water lily) flowers. It had a fishing community of Paratavar people.

== Location ==
The location of Muziris (Muchiri) provides clues for identifying Tyndis, which was 500 stadia (~92 km) north of it ("by river and sea"). The exact location of the port remains uncertain. Possible candidates include the following modern sites:

- Kadalundi
  - About 117 km north of Kodungallur.
  - At the mouth of the Chaliyar and Kadalundi rivers.
  - Etymology: Kadal (sea) + Thundi (navel)
  - An open harbour entrance through a channel ~ 12 m deep that does not require dredging.
- Ponnani
  - About 74 km north of Kodungallur.
  - At the mouth of Bharathappuzha river.
  - Located opposite the Palakkad Gap.
- Panthalayini Kollam (Quilandy)

== See also ==
- Muziris
