= George L. Hart =

American linguist, Tamil studies researcher and translator

George Luzerne Hart, III (born c. 1942) is Professor Emeritus of Tamil language at the University of California, Berkeley. His work focuses on the classical Tamil literature and on identifying the relationships between the Tamil and Sanskrit literature. In 2015 the Government of India awarded him the title of Padma Shri, the fourth highest civilian honour.

== Life and career ==
Hart received his PhD in Sanskrit from Harvard University in 1971. He has also studied Latin and Greek as well as several modern European and Indian languages. He taught Sanskrit at the University of Wisconsin–Madison before joining the faculty at the University of California, Berkeley, where he founded the Tamil Department.

Hart is best known for his translations of several Tamil epics into English and for his argument that Tamil is a classical language, a status that the Government of India formally accorded it on 18 September 2004.

Hart is also the author of several Tamil and Sanskrit textbooks.

He is married to Kausalya Hart, who is also a professor and Tamil textbook author.

== Works ==
Books

- The Poems of Ancient Tamil, Their Milieu and Their Sanskrit Counterparts, University of California Press, 1975. ISBN 0-520-02672-1.
- The Relation between Tamil and Classical Sanskrit Literature, Wiesbaden: Otto Harrassowitz, 1976. ISBN 3-447-01785-6.
- Poets of the Tamil Anthologies: Ancient Poems of Love and War, Princeton University Press, 1979. ISBN 0-691-06406-7.
- A Rapid Sanskrit Method, Motilal Banarsidass, 1984. ISBN 81-208-0199-7.
- The Forest Book of the Rāmāyaṇa of Kampan̲, (with Hank Heifetz), University of California Press, 1989. ISBN 0-520-06088-1.
- The Four Hundred Songs of War and Wisdom: An Anthology of Poems from Classical Tamil, the Purananuru. (with Hank Heifetz), Columbia University Press, 1999. ISBN 0-231-11563-6.

Selected articles

- "Early Evidence for Caste in South India", in Hockings (ed), Dimensions of Social Life: Essays in honour of David B. Mandelbaum, Berlin: Mouton Gruyter, 1987, pp. 467–491.

== Views and reception ==
=== Poems of Ancient Tamil ===
Hart's Poems of Ancient Tamil offers a comparative analysis of ancient Tamil poetry (Sangam literature) with reference to the classical Indo-Aryan (Sanskrit and Prakrit) literature. It sets forth a "very convincing argument" that the themes of southern poets were assimilated into the Prakrit and classical Sanskrit poetry, such as Gaha Sattasai and the poetry of Kalidasa. However, there was little influence of the northern literary expression on the Tamil literature. To substantiate this thesis, Hart provides a thorough analysis of the antecedents of the ancient Tamil poetry and its cultural milieu, which focused on controlling sacred power among various social classes, and its reflection in the later literate poetry. Hart points out that the Indo-Aryan poetry, in its borrowing of the Tamil literary elements, lacked the subtlety and sophistication of its Tamil counterparts. Reviewer Lucetta Mowry finds it to be the "beginning of a valuable and important study" of the relation between the two Indic traditions.

This endorsement is contested by the scholar of Middle Indo-Aryan languages K. R. Norman, who finds the comparisons made by Hart between Tamil poems and similar Prakrit poems misleading as they ignore the fact that the Prakrit verses were expected to have two meanings, the obvious meaning as well as a hidden erotic meaning. He also questions Hart's proposition that the arya metre used in Sanskrit and Prakrit poetry is related to the Tamil metre, the dating of the Gaha Sattasai (the main Prakrit work considered by Hart), the neglect of the earlier Middle Indo-Aryan texts, and the idea that the borrowings only happened at the poetic level rather than in the mixed heritage of the Indo-Aryan culture in the north.

Tamil scholar Kamil Zvelebil states that Hart had set before himself "very difficult and even enormous tasks," but he has not succeeded in solving them. According to him, Hart's work involved four key insights: that in ancient Tamilnadu practically everything was filled with sacred forces, that the stress on female chastity was characteristically Tamil, that there are striking parallels between Tamil and Sanskrit-Prakrit poetry, and that the theory of dhvani or 'suggestion' is Dravidian in origin. He finds some of these ideas questionable. However, others are "truly marvellous," e.g., the ones about aṇaṅku, sacred, dangerous power, the female breasts being the seat of aṇaṅku, the different nature of indigenous gods from those of the north, and the idea that all aspects of love between man and woman were animated by the sacred, etc. The over-all thesis of the influence of southern imagery and poetic techniques on the Indo-Aryan poetry such as Sattasai and even Kalidasa are probable and "overwhelmingly convincing." Zvelebil calls the book a "refreshing, original, excellent work of first-class importance."

V. S. Rajam disagrees with Hart’s views on aṇaṅku as female sacred power, calling it oversimplified and reductionist. She states that the term has undergone a semantic shift over time."

Following the publication of The Poems of Ancient Tamil, Hart published an abridged booklet, The Relation between Tamil and Classical Sanskrit Literature, in which he set out his key points. He clarified that his proposal was not of a direct transmission of poetic techniques from the Tamil poetry to Sanskrit, but rather that both of them owed these techniques to a common source, which he placed in the Deccan megalithic cultures. Gaha Sattasai in Maharashtri Prakrit was contemporaneous with the Tamil Sangam poetry and Kalidasa himself had composed very similar poems in Maharashtri Prakrit. The key examples of striking similarities were the messenger poem, the motif of separation of lovers during the monsoon and the comparison of the sound of wind through a bamboo hole to the noise of a flute.

=== Early Evidence for Caste in South India ===
Hart's observations on the features of the early South Indian caste system, which are said to have been independent of the Indo-Aryan varna system, are summarised in Early Evidence for Caste in South India, which has received significant attention from social and cultural historians. According to Chakravarti, the Sangam literature reveals that there was a class of 'low-born' people, such as the Pulaiyar and Paraiyar, who were made to live in separate settlements at a distance from the main villages. They were engaged in occupations such as leather work, washing of clothes and fishing. They were also associated with 'death' and were believed to have the ability to control and isolate sacred power (aṇaṅku), but not the ability to transform it. According to Samuel, the 'low-born' groups, acting as drummers, bards and musicians, were central to maintaining the king's power, allowing him to tap into the ritual power and transform it into auspicious power. Samuel notes, however, that the notion of 'low-born' occupational groups representing ritual power may not be limited to Tamilnadu. Very similar situation persists to this day in Ladakh, Nepal and elsewhere in the Himalayas. Even in north India, the social reality outside the Brahmanical theory might have been similar to the Tamil system.

According to Hart, when the Brahmins from north India arrived in the Tamilnadu, probably around 300 BCE, they offered an alternative source of power through Vedic sacrifices, which was already considered pure and auspicious, and to emphasise the distinction between themselves and the 'low-born' groups, the Brahmins developed conventions quite the opposite of the latter, becoming strict vegetarians and not allowing dogs and chickens into their villages. Through the Brahmins and the Hinduism they brought, the Tamil kings aspired to rise above the endemic warfare and establish stable empires modelled after the Mauryan Empire. Once this was accomplished, Hart states that the 'low-born' groups gradually lost their ritual function, becoming purely occupational groups of low status.

== Awards ==
For The Four Hundred Songs of War and Wisdom, a translation of Purananuru, Hart and his co-author Hank Heifetz were awarded the AAS South Asia Council (SAC) Ramanujan Book Prize.

His Poets of The Tamil Anthologies (1979) was nominated for the American Book Award.

In 2015, Hart was awarded the Padma Shri by the Government of India for his contributions to the study and translation of Indian literature, particularly the Sangam literature of ancient Tamil.

== See also ==
- List of translators into English
