= Kuttuvan Kotai =

Chera ruler

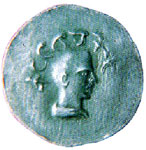
- Kuttuvan Kotai. Legend in Tamil-Brahmi: "Ku-t-tu-va-n Ko-tai"
- House: Chera dynasty

Kuttuvan Kotai (Tamil: குட்டுவன் கோதை), also spelled Kothai/Kodai, was a Chera ruler of early historic (pre-Pallava) south India.

Silver coins bearing a portrait facing right with Tamil-Brahmi legend "Ku-t-tu-va-n Ko-tai" have been discovered from Amaravati riverbed in Karur, central Tamil Nadu. The reverse of the coins are blank. The coin seems to be an imitation of the Roman portrait head coins. Whether these coins were used as a currency in trade transactions is not clear.

Scholars identify Kotai with "Cheraman Kuttuvan Kotai" mentioned in the early Tamil text Purananuru, 54. This Chera is mentioned as Kotai, not as Kuttuvan Kotai, in the body of the poem, but the appended colophon gives the full name "Kuttuvan Kotai". The Chera is eulogized in the Puram by Konattu Ericchalur Matalur/Matalan Madurai Kumarananar (Purananuru). The son of Chera ruler Cenkuttuvan was also referred to as "Kuttuvan Cheral".

Kuttuvan was probably an ancient title for the Chera rulers of south India. Early Tamil texts refer to "Kuttuvar" as a kingship group and "Kuttanatu" as the country of the Kuttuva people. The term Kuttanatu is indicated in the entry in Periplus Maris Erythraei, referring to "Cottonora", ‘where the pepper grows’. The estuarine region Kottayam and Alappuzha districts of Kerala is now known as Kuttanatu.
