= Nedum Cheralathan =

2nd century Chera dynasty ruler in south India

- Imayavarampan ('He whose kingdom had the Himalayas as its boundary'); Adhiraja
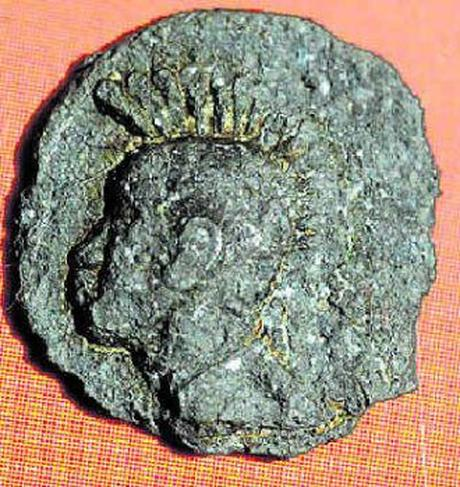
- An early historic Chera coin from south India (with a helmet similar to Roman helmet)

2nd (recorded) Chera ruler
- Reign: fl. c. 155 CE
- Predecessor: Uthiyan Cheralathan
- Spouse: Chola Manakkilli; Padumandevi
- Issue: Chenguttuvan Chera (Vel Kezhu Kuttuvan); Kalankayakkanni Narmudi Cheral; Adu Kottu Pattu Cheralathan
- House: Chera Dynasty
- Father: Uthiyan Cheralathan

Nedum Cheralathan (fl. c. 155 CE, title "Imayavarampan") was a Chera ruler from early historic south India (c. 1st - 4th century CE). He likely belonged to the Muchiri-Karur branch of the Chera dynasty.

Among other things, Nedum Cheralathan was notable for capturing and punishing the Yavanas (a loose term used for Greeks, Romans, Persians, and Arabs) on the Malabar Coast.

== Background ==
Nedum Cheralathan is praised in the Second Ten of Pathitruppathu Collection, composed by poet Kannanar. In return for his work, the poet was generously rewarded with 500 settlements in a region called "Umbar Kadu" (believed to be in present-day Kerala) and a share of the revenue from the thennadu ("the southern country") for 38 years. According to these poems, Nedum Cheralathan ruled the Chera country for 58 years.

Nedum Cheralathan was born to his predecessor, Uthiyan Cheralathan, and his wife Venmal Nallini, the daughter of Veliyan—who is possibly also identified as the father of the Ay chieftain Eyinan. He had three sons: "Kalankayakkanni" Narmudi Cheral, Chenkuttuvan — also known as "Kadalottiya" Vel Kezhu Kuttuvan — and "Adu Kottu Pattu" Cheralathan. Narmudi Cheral and Adu Kottu Pattu Cheralathan were born to Vel Avi Koma[ka]n Paduman Devi, while Chenkuttuvan was born to Manakilli, a royal princess of the Chola dynasty.

== Military achievements ==
Nedum Cheralathan is praised in the early Tamil literature for subduing "seven kings" and carving the Chera bow emblem on the Himalayas, symbolizing his conquest from the northern mountains all the way down to Comorin. He is also said to have won the prestigious title "adhiraja.

One of his notable campaigns was against the Kadambu clan, likely the Kadambas, who were based on an "island" ["iru munnirthuruthi"] on the Malabar Coast (?). Their sacred kadambu tree, which served as a symbol of their clan and was worshipped as a guardian spirit, was uprooted by Nedum Cheralathan after he crossed the sea to defeat them.

Nedum Cheralathan is also credited with a victory over the Yavanas – probably Graeco-Roman navigators – on the Kerala coast. He captured several of them and, as punishment, poured hot ghee on their heads. However, he later released them in exchange for a heavy ransom that included diamonds, other precious stones, and intricately crafted vessels.

=== Identification with Kudakko Nedum Cheralathan ===
Imayavarampan Nedum Cheralathan is sometimes identified with Cheraman "Kudakko Nedum Cheralathan". According to some sources, Cheraman Kudakko Nedum Cheralathan fought a battle against the Chola ruler Velpakradakkai Peruvirar "Perunar" Killi, at a location called "Por" in the Chola country, over an area known as Pamalur. The battle was so intense that both the Chera and Chola kings are said to have perished in the conflict.

== Quotes ==
Akananuru (396) contains the following lines about the Chera ruler Nedum Cheralathan carving his bow emblem on the Himalayas:

"I am afraid I will lose you. Should you leave,

you need to return my beauty, lovely like Vanji city of the victorious Cheran king who attacked with rage the trembling Aryans, captured their king and carved the Chera bow

symbol on the ancient, northern mountains" .

— Akananuru (396), Paranar, Marutham Thinai

Akananuru (127), composed by Mamulanar in the Palai Thinai, also mentions the military achievements of Nedum Cheralathan:

"May you live long, my friend! Your faultless

lover will not stay in another country, where they speak a different language, letting your bright bangles to become loose, and your body to become thin, struggling here each day with sorrow and distress, even if he were given the wealth that King Neduncheralāthan with victory drums, who rode the seas and chopped the sacred kadampam tree of his enemy, and like his ancestors, carved the curved bow symbol on the Himalayas, got as tributes from his enemies fine jewels gold female figurines and diamonds in huge quantities known by the word āmpal, heaped them in his palace yard in Mānthai city, and abandoned them for the land to devour.

He will not stay away another day on the fierce, forked path where uneducated men who wear lovely clusters of delicate, white flowers with red stems from kadampam trees with sturdy trunks, on their tight, curly hair, carry curved bows on their

left side, and are looking for those who travel."

— Akananuru (127), Mamulanar, Palai Thinai

The Pattirupattu collection also mentions the military achievements of Nedum Cheralathan:

"O Cēralātaṉ with an army that is murderous in battle

with a chest with sandal paste [smeared on it], with fiber-filtered toddy, [and] with victorious war [in which] the paṇai drum was made, which sounds by beating after [you] had won, after [you] had been lifted on the golden ornamented neck of [your] flawless elephant with tusks excel in strength, which shines with abundant fresh garlands on [its] chest together with ōṭai ornaments, after [you] had overcome while the bravery of the ones who uttered praises of [other] kings failed, [kings] between the southern Kumari and the famous Imayam where āriyar live where the yaks (kavari) sleep on the slopes dense with kavir-trees

dream about narantam and shiny splashing waterfalls."

— Patirruppattu (The Second Decade:11th Song) - Blood that the Wounds Spew
