= Uthiyan Cheralathan =

Chera Dynasty ruler in south India

- King; Cheraman; Vanavarampan; Perum Chottu

1st (recorded) Chera Ruler
- Monarchy: (unknown exact reign) estimate anywhere from 650 BCE- 300 CE 130 CE (likely)
- Successor: Nedum Cheralathan
- Spouse: Queen Veliyan Nallini
- Issue: Nedum Cheralathan
Regnal name
- Uthiyan Cheralathan
- House: Chera

Uthiyan Cheralathan (c. 130 CE, titles "Vanavarampan" or "Perum Chottu") is the earliest known Chera ruler of early historic south India (c. 1st - 4th century CE), as attested by extant Tamil literary sources (the Sangam Literature). He is widely regarded as the hero of the lost decad of the Pathitruppathu Collection (the First Decad) and the earliest recorded ruler of the western coast branch (Muchiri-Vanchi) of the Chera dynasty.

== Life and career ==
Uthiyan Cheralathan was known by the royal epithet "Vanavarampan", meaning either "One whose Kingdom is Bounded by the Sky" or "Beloved of the Gods". The latter title had previously been adopted by the Maurya emperor Ashoka.

According to early Tamil poems, Uthiyan Cheralathan supplied both rival armies in the epic battle of the Mahabharata with sacred rice (or, alternatively, offered sacrificial rice to his ancestors), earning him the title "Perum Chottu". Notably, the same honor is also claimed by the Pandyas and Cholas. A later Chera ruler, "Kottambalathu Thunchiya" Makkothai, locates Uthiyan Cheralathan's great kitchen (the attil) at a place called "Kuzhumur", possibly in present-day Kerala.

The poetic claim that Uthiyan Cheralathan took part in the happenings of the Mahabharata, identifies him, as he bore the famous title "Perum Chorru" said to having fed the hundred Kaurava and Pandava princes during the Mahabharata war. It is considered that this interpretation seems to take place in different timelines.

Several historical works portray Uthiyan Cheralathan as a warrior who engaged in conflict with a Satavahana ruler. In Ancient Indian History (1988), Madhavan Arjunan Pillai specifically identifies this ruler as Satakarni II, whom he defeated.Pran Nath Chopra, T. K. Ravindran and N. Subrahmanian state that during the reign of Perum Sorru Uthiyan Cheral Adan, the Satavahana ruler Satakarni II invaded the northern marches of Tamilakam and was defeated and driven back by the Five Velirs.

Veliyan Venmal Nallini, daughter of Veliyan, a Princess of the Ay family, was the royal Queen consort of Uthiyan Cheralathan. Uthiyan Cheralathan is sometimes identified with "Cheraman Perum Cheralathan". Perum Cheralathan was the opponent of the Chola ruler Karikala in the battle of Venni. During the battle, he was wounded on the back while leading his warriors. Unable to bear the disgrace, he committed suicide by slow starvation ("Sitting by Facing the North"). It is said that some of his companions also took their own lives, unwilling to be separated from him. The Perum Cheralathan of the battle of Venni is also sometimes identified with "Adu Kottu Pattu" Cheralathan.Uthiyan Cheralathan was succeeded by his son Nedum Cheralathan.

== Quotes ==
"You are king of a country with prosperous towns! The sky is your limit! O Greatness who gave unlimited rice, until those hundred men wearing golden thumpai flower garlands had seized the land and perished in the field fighting furiously against the five whose horses wore swaying plumes!"

— Purananuru (Verse - 2)
