= Ananku (sacred forces) =

Ananku (pronounced Aṇaṅku), according to the early historic Tamil belief system, refers to the sacred forces inhabiting various objects, including humans. It was controlled through the performance of specific rites and rituals. Ananku was also believed to manifest in women, with the notion that in chaste women, it remained controlled and possessed auspicious potential.

Certain communities were tasked with performing the rites and rituals needed to regulate the ananku.

The belief in the ananku is notably attested in the ancient Tamil literature or the Sangam Literature of the early historic period.
