= Kaveri Poompattanatthu Kaari Kannanar =

Poet of the Sangam period

Kārikkannanār, known in full as Kāviripoompattinathu Kārikkannanār (Tamil: காவிரிப்பூம்பட்டினத்துக் காரிக்கண்ணனார்), was a poet of the Sangam period, to whom 10 verses of the Sangam literature have been attributed, including verse 28 of the Tiruvalluva Maalai.

== Biography ==
Hailing from Kaveri Poompattinam (present-day Puhar), Kaari Kannanar was a trader by occupation and has sung in praise of kings Chola Kura Palli Thunjiya Perunthirumavalavan, Pandiyan Ilavanthigai Palli Thunjiya Nanmaran, Pandiyan Velliyambalatthu Thunjiya Peruvaludhi, Aai Aandiran, and Pittan Kottran. He compared the Chola and Pandiya rulers with Lord Vishnu and Balarama. His time was close to that of Uraiyur Marutthuvan Dhamodharanar, Kovoor Kilar, Maadalan Madurai Kumaranar, Aavoor Moolam Kilar, Nakkirar I, and Marudhanila Naganar.

== Contribution to the Sangam literature ==
Kaari Kannanar has written 10 Sangam verses, including 5 in Purananuru (verses 57, 58, 169, 171, and 353), 1 in Kurunthogai (verse 297), 3 in Agananuru (verses 107, 123, and 285), and 1 in Tiruvalluva Maalai (verse 28).

=== Views on Valluvar and the Kural ===
Kaari Kannanar opines about Valluvar and the Kural text thus:

It is no other than Ayan (Brahma) himself, seated on the beautiful lotus-flower, who, assuming the form of Valluvar, has given to the world the truths of the Vēdas, that they may shine without being mixed up with falsehood.

== See also ==
- Sangam literature
- List of Sangam poets
- Tiruvalluva Maalai
