= Kovoor Kilar =

Poet of the Sangam period

Kōvūr Kilār (Tamil: கோவூர் கிழார்) was a poet of the Sangam period, to whom 18 verses of the Sangam literature have been attributed, including verse 38 of the Tiruvalluva Maalai.

== Biography ==
Kovoor Kilar hailed from the town of Kovoor in Sonaadu. He belonged to the Vellalar caste and had friendly relationships with the Chola rulers. He was known for his bold and truthful attitude. He is also known for teaching moral lesson to a king who doubted him as spy. When king Killivalavan tried to trample the people of Malaiyaman by elephant, Kovoor Kilar boldly persuaded him to change his mind and act otherwise. He is believed to be the contemporary of Sangam poets Uraiyur Marutthuvan Dhamodharanar, Madalan Madurai Kumaranar, and Kaveri Poompattanatthu Kaari Kannanar, since these poets, too, have sung on the Chola ruler Kurappalli Thunjiya Perunthirumavalavan. Several historical details can be found in his writings.

== Contribution to the Sangam literature ==
Kovoor Kilar has written 18 Sangam verses, including 1 in Kurunthogai (verse 65), 1 in Natrinai (verse 393), 15 in Purananuru (verses 31–33, 41, 44–47, 68, 70, 308, 373, 382, 386, and 400), and 1 in Tiruvalluva Maalai (verse 38).

== See also ==
- Sangam literature
- List of Sangam poets
- Tiruvalluva Maalai
