= List of Sangam poets =

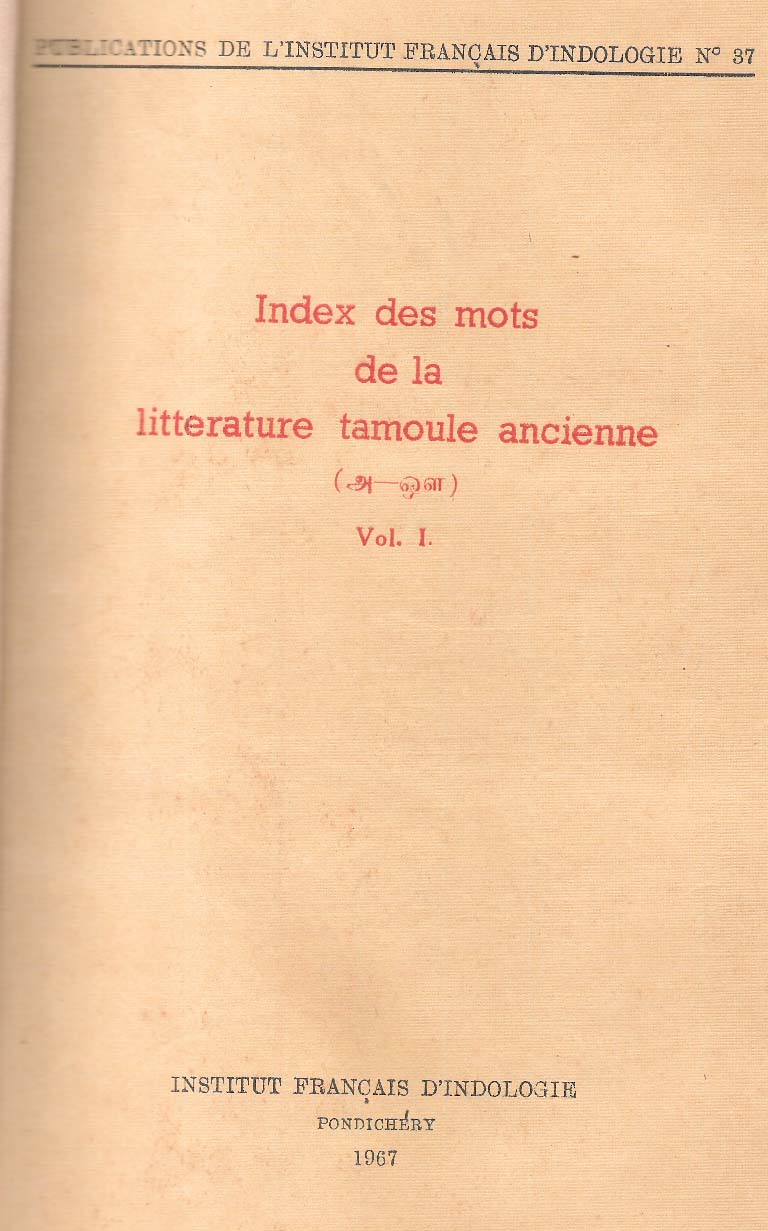
Word index of Sangam literature

Sangam refers to the assembly of the highly learned people of the ancient Tamil land, with the primary aim of advancing the literature. There is no historical evidence to suggest that there were three Sangams. It is a medieval myth propagated by the medieval writers. Sangam is a latter appellation given to the congregation of poets that often took place in ancient Pandian country, until around 300 CE, with 449 poets contributing under the patronage of 49 Pandyan kings.

== List of Sangam poets ==
Below is a list of poets of the Sangam period:

S. No.	Poet	Name in Tamil	Contribution to the Sangam literature (verse numbers in parentheses)	Notes
1	Anonymous poets	பெயர் தெரியாத புலவர்கள் பாடியவை	Akananuru (114, 117, 165), Kurunthogai (191, 256, 313, 321, 326, 375, 379, 381, 395), Natrinai (8, 10, 22, 24, 45, 46, 84, 92, 107, 108, 111, 115, 125, 126, 132, 134, 160, 161, 162, 163, 164, 165, 166, 167, 168, 169, 170, 171, 182, 173, 174, 175, 176, 177, 178, 179, 180, 181, 182, 183, 184, 185, 186, 188, 189, 190, 192, 193, 195, 207, 229, 235, 271, 355, 385, 396), Purananuru (244, 256, 257, 263, 297, 307, 323, 327, 328, 333, 339, 355), Paripaadal (1, 22)	
2	Aiyāthi Siruventhēraiyār	ஐயாதிச் சிறுவெண்தேரையார்	Purananuru (363)	Authored a sole Sangam verse
3	Aiyūr Moolankilār	ஐயூர் மூலங்கிழார்	Purananuru (21)	Authored a sole Sangam verse
4	Aiyūr Mudavanār	ஐயூர் முடவனார்	Akananuru (216), Kurunthogai (123, 206, 322), Natrinai (206, 334), Purananuru (51, 228, 314, 399)	
5	Akampam Malāthanār	அகம்பன் மாலாதனார்	Natrinai (81)	Authored a sole Sangam verse
6	Ālamperi Sāthanār	ஆலம்பேரி சாத்தனார்	Akananuru (47, 81, 143, 175), Natrinai (152, 255)	
7	Ālankudi Vankanār	ஆலங்குடி வங்கனார்	Akananuru (106), Kurunthogai (8, 45), Purananuru (319)	
8	Ālathūr Kilār	ஆலத்தூர் கிழார்	Kurunthogai (112, 350), Purananuru (34, 36, 69, 225, 324)	
9	Alisi Nachāthanār	அழிசி நச்சாத்தனார்	Kurunthogai (271)	Authored a sole Sangam verse
10	Allankeeranār	அல்லங்கீரனார்	Natrinai (245)	Authored a sole Sangam verse
11	Allūr Nanmullaiyār	அள்ளூர் நன்முல்லையார்	Akananuru (46), Kurunthogai (32, 67, 68, 93, 96, 140, 157, 202, 237), Purananuru (306, 340)	
12	Ammallanār	அம்மள்ளனார்	Natrinai (82)	Authored a sole Sangam verse
13	Ammeyyan Nākanār	அம்மெய்யன் நாகனார்	Natrinai (252)	Authored a sole Sangam verse
14	Ammoovanār	அம்மூவனார்	Ainkurunuru (101–200), Akananuru (10, 140, 280, 370, 390), Kurunthogai (49, 125, 163, 303, 306, 318, 327, 340, 351, 397, 401), Natrinai (4, 35, 76, 138, 275, 307, 315, 327, 395, 397)	
15	Andar Makan Kuruvaluthiyār	அண்டர் மகன் குறுவழுதியார்	Akananuru (228), Kurunthogai (345), Purananuru (346)	
16	Andar Nadum Kallinār	அண்டர் நடும் கல்லினார்	Purananuru (283, 344, 345)	
17	Anilādu Mundriyār	அணிலாடு முன்றிலார்	Kurunthogai (41)	Authored a sole Sangam verse
18	Anjil Anjiyār	அஞ்சில் அஞ்சியார்	Natrinai (90)	Authored a sole Sangam verse
19	Anjil Ānthaiyār	அஞ்சில் ஆந்தையார்	Kurunthogai (294), Natrinai (233)	
20	Anjitathai Makal Nākaiyār	அஞ்சியத்தை மகள் நாகையார்	Akananuru (352)	Authored a sole Sangam verse
21	Anthil Ilankeeranār	அந்தி இளங்கீரனார்	Akananuru (71)	Authored a sole Sangam verse
22	Arisil Kilār	அரிசில் கிழார்	Kurunthogai (193), Pathitrupathu (71–80), Purananuru (146, 230, 281, 285, 300, 304, 342)	
23	Āriyappadai Kadantha Neduncheliyan	ஆரியப் படை கடந்த நெடுஞ்செழியன்	Purananuru (183)	Authored a sole Sangam verse
24	Ārkkadu Kilār Makanār Vellai Kannathanār	ஆர்க்காடு கிழார் மகனார் வெள்ளைக் கண்ணத்தனார்	Akananuru (64)	Authored a sole Sangam verse
25	Ārya Arasan Yāl Bramadathan	ஆரிய அரசன் யாழ்ப்பிரமதத்தன்	Kurunthogai (184)	Authored a sole Sangam verse
26	Āsiriyar Perunkannanār	ஆசிரியர் பெருங்கண்ணனார்	Kurunthogai (239)	Authored a sole Sangam verse
27	Āthimanthiyār	ஆதிமந்தியார்	Kurunthogai (31)	Authored a sole Sangam verse
28	Athiyan Vinnathanār	அதியன் விண்ணத்தனார்	Akananuru (301)	Authored a sole Sangam verse
29	Āvaduthurai Māsāthanār	ஆவடுதுறை மாசாத்தனார்	Purananuru (227)	Authored a sole Sangam verse
30	Āviyār	ஆவியார்	Purananuru (298)	Authored a sole Sangam verse
31	Āvūr Kāvithikal Sāthevanār	ஆவூர்க் காவிதிகள் சாதேவனார்	Natrinai (264)	Authored a sole Sangam verse
32	Āvūr Kilār	ஆவூர் கிழார்	Purananuru (322)	
33	Āvūr Kilār Makanār Kannanār	ஆவூர் கிழார் மகனார் கண்ணனார்	Akananuru (202)	Authored a sole Sangam verse
34	Āvūr Moolankilār	ஆவூர் மூலங்கிழார்	Akananuru (24, 156, 341), Purananuru (38, 40, 166, 177, 178, 196, 261, 301)	
35	Āvūr Moolankilar Makanār Perunthalai Sāthanār	ஆவூர் மூலங்கிழார் மகனார் பெருந்தலை சாத்தனார்	Akananuru (224)	Authored a sole Sangam verse
36	Avvaiyār	ஔவையார் (முதலாம்)	Akananuru (11, 147, 273, 303), Kurunthogai (15, 23, 28, 29, 39, 43, 80, 91, 99, 102, 158, 183, 200, 364, 388), Natrinai (129, 187, 295, 371, 381, 390, 394), Purananuru (87–104, 140, 187, 206, 231, 232, 235, 269, 286, 290, 295, 311, 315, 367, 390, 392)	
37	Chēnthan Keeranār	சேந்தன் கீரனார்	Kurunthogai (311)	Authored a sole Sangam verse
38	Chēnthankannanār	சேந்தங் கண்ணனார்	Akananuru (350), Natrinai (54)	
39	Chēramān Ilankuttuvan	சேரமான் இளங்குட்டுவன்	Akananuru (153)	Authored a sole Sangam verse
40	Chēramān Kanaikkāl Irumporai	சேரமான் கணைக்கால் இரும்பொறை	Purananuru (74)	Authored a sole Sangam verse
41	Chēramān Kōttampalathu Thunjiya Mākōthai	சேரமான் கோட்டம்பலத்துத் துஞ்சிய மாக்கோதை	Purananuru (245)	Authored a sole Sangam verse
42	Chēramānenthai	சேரமானெந்தை	Kurunthogai (22)	Authored a sole Sangam verse
43	Chōlan Kulamutrathu Thunjiya Killivalavan	சோழன் குளமுற்றத்துத் துஞ்சிய கிள்ளிவளவன்	Purananuru (173)	Authored a sole Sangam verse
44	Chōlan Nalankilli	சோழன் நலங்கிள்ளி	Purananuru (73, 75)	
45	Chōlan Nalluruthiran	சோழன் நல்லுருத்திரன்	Purananuru (190), Kalithogai (101–117)	Several scholars attribute all the poems in the later anthology Kalithokai to one poet, possibly Nallanthuvanār, and believe that they were erroneously assigned to five poets (Pālai to Pālai Pādiya Perunkadunkō, Kurinji to Kapilar, Marutham to Maruthan Ilanākanār, Mullai to Chōlan Nalluruthiran, and Neythal to Nallanthuvanār) due to later venpā.
46	Chōnāttu Mukaiyalūr Sirukarunthumpiyār	சோணாட்டு முகையலூர்ச் சிறுகருந்தும்பியார்	Purananuru (181, 265)	
47	Eelathu Poothanthēvanār	ஈழத்துப் பூதன்தேவனார்	Akananuru (88), Kurunthogai (343)	
48	Eloo Uppandri Nākan Kumaranār	எழூஉப்பன்றி நாகன் குமரனார்	Akananuru (138, 240)	
49	Erukkattūr Thāyankannanār	எருக்காட்டூர்த் தாயங்கண்ணனார்	Akananuru (149, 319, 357), Purananuru (397)	
50	Erumai Veliyanār	எருமை வெளியனார்	Akananuru (73), Purananuru (273, 303)	
51	Erumai Veliyanār Makanār Kadalanār	எருமை வெளியனார் மகனார் கடலனார்	Akananuru (72)	Authored a sole Sangam verse
52	Eyinanthai Makan Ilankeeranār	எயினந்தை மகன் இளங்கீரனார்	Akananuru (3, 225, 239, 289, 299, 361, 371, 395, 399), Natrinai (269, 308, 346)	
53	Eyinanthaiyār	எயினந்தையார்	Natrinai (43)	Authored a sole Sangam verse
54	Eyitriyanār	எயிற்றியனார்	Kurunthogai (286)	Authored a sole Sangam verse
55	Idaikkādanār	இடைக்காடனார்	Akananuru (139, 194, 274, 284, 304, 374), Kurunthogai (251), Natrinai (142, 221, 316), Purananuru (42)	
56	Idaikkundrūr Kilār	இடைக்குன்றூர் கிழார்	Purananuru (76, 77, 78, 79)	
57	Idaiyan Chēnthankotranār	இடையன் சேந்தங்கொற்றனார்	Akananuru (375)	Authored a sole Sangam verse
58	Idaiyan Nedunkeeranār	இடையன் நெடுங்கீரனார்	Akananuru (166)	Authored a sole Sangam verse
59	Ilamperuvaluthiyār	இளம்பெருவழுதியார்	Paripaadal (15)	Authored a sole Sangam verse
60	Ilampoothanār	இளம்பூதனார்	Kurunthogai (334)	Authored a sole Sangam verse
61	Ilampōthiyār	இளம்போதியார்	Natrinai (72)	Authored a sole Sangam verse
62	Ilampullūr Kavithi	இளம்புல்லூர்க் காவிதி	Natrinai (89)	Authored a sole Sangam verse
63	Ilanakanār	இளநாகனார்	Natrinai (151, 205, 231)	
64	Ilankadunkō	இளங்கடுங்கோ	Akananuru (96, 176)	
65	Ilankannanār	இளங் கண்ணனார்	Akananuru (264)	Authored a sole Sangam verse
66	Ilankeeranār	இளங்கீரனார்	Kurunthogai (116), Natrinai (3), (62, 113)	
67	Ilankeeranthaiyār	இளங்கீரந்தையார்	Kurunthogai (148)	Authored a sole Sangam verse
68	Ilankousikanār	இளங்கௌசிகனார்	Akananuru (381)	Authored a sole Sangam verse
69	Ilanthēvanār	இளந்தேவனார்	Natrinai (41)	Authored a sole Sangam verse
70	Ilanthiraiyanār	இளந்திரையனார்	Natrinai (94, 99)	
71	Ilavēttanār	இளவேட்டனார்	Natrinai (33, 157)	
72	Ilaveyinanār	இளவெயினனார்	Natrinai (263)	Authored a sole Sangam verse
73	Immen Keeranār	இம்மென் கீரனார்	Akananuru (398)	Authored a sole Sangam verse
74	Inisanthanākanār	இனிசந்தநாகனார்	Natrinai (66)	Authored a sole Sangam verse
75	Iraiyanār	இறையனார்	Kurunthogai (2)	Authored a sole Sangam verse
76	Iraniyamuttathu Perunkundrūr Perunkousikanār	இரணியமுட்டத்துப் பெருங்குன்றூர்ப் பெருங்கெளசிகனார்	Malaipatukataam	Authored a sole Sangam verse
77	Irankukudi Kundra Nādan	இறங்குகுடிக் குன்ற நாடன்	Akananuru (215)	Authored a sole Sangam verse
78	Irumpidarthalaiyār	இரும்பிடர்த் தலையார்	Purananuru (3)	Authored a sole Sangam verse
79	Irunkōn Ollaiyān Chenkannanār	இருங்கோன் ஒல்லையான் செங்கண்ணனார்	Akananuru (279)	Authored a sole Sangam verse
80	Irunthaiyūr Kotran Pulavanār	இருந்தையூர்க் கொற்றன் புலவனார்	Kurunthogai (335)	Authored a sole Sangam verse
81	Kachipēttu Ilanthachanār	கச்சிப்பேட்டு இளந்தச்சனார்	Natrinai (266)	Authored a sole Sangam verse
82	Kachipēttu Kānji Kotranār	கச்சிப்பேட்டுக் காஞ்சிக் கொற்றனார்	Kurunthogai (213, 216)	
83	Kachipēttu Nannākaiyār	கச்சிப்பேட்டு நன்னாகையார்	Kurunthogai (30, 172, 180, 192, 197, 287)	
84	Kachipēttu Perunthachanār	கச்சிப்பேட்டுப் பெருந்தச்சனார்	Natrinai (144, 213)	
85	Kadalul Māyntha Ilamveruvaluthi	கடலுள் மாய்ந்த இளம்பெருவழுதி	Paripaadal (15), Purananuru (182)	
86	Kadampanūr Sāndiliyanār	கடம்பனூர்ச் சாண்டிலியனார்	Kurunthogai (307)	Authored a sole Sangam verse
87	Kadiyalūr Uruthirankannanār	கடியலூர் உருத்திரங்கண்ணனார்	Akananuru (167), Kurunthogai (352), Perumpanatruppadai, Pattinappaalai	
88	Kaduku Perunthēvanār	கடுகு பெருந்தேவனார்	Kurunthogai (255)	Authored a sole Sangam verse
89	Kadunthōtkaraveeranār	கடுந்தோட் கரவீரனார்	Kurunthogai (69)	Authored a sole Sangam verse
90	Kaduthokai Kāvinār	கடுந்தொடைக் காவினார்	Akananuru (109)	Authored a sole Sangam verse
91	Kaduvan Ila Mallanār	கடுவன் இளமள்ளனார்	Natrinai (150)	Authored a sole Sangam verse
92	Kaduvan Ilaveyinanār	கடுவன் இளவெயினனார்	Paripaadal (3, 4, 5)	
93	Kaduvan Mallanār (also known as Madhurai Tamil Koothanār Kaduvan Mallanār)	கடுவன் மள்ளனார் (மதுரை தமிழ் கூத்தனார் கடுவன் மள்ளனார்)	Akananuru (70, 256, 354), Kurunthogai (82)	
94	Kākkai Pādiniyār Nachellaiyār	காக்கை பாடினியார் நச்செள்ளையார்	Kurunthogai (210), Purananuru (278), Pathitrupathu (51–60)	
95	Kalaithin Yānaiyār	கழைதின் யானையார்	Purananuru (204)	Authored a sole Sangam verse
96	Kalārkeeran Eyitriyār	கழார்க்கீரன் எயிற்றியார்	Akananuru (163, 217, 235, 294), Kurunthogai (35, 261, 330), Natrinai (281, 312)	
97	Kalāthalaiyār	கழாத்தலையார்	Purananuru (62, 65, 270, 288, 289, 368)	
98	Kāleri Kadikaiyār	காலெறி கடிகையார்	Kurunthogai (267)	Authored a sole Sangam verse
99	Kallādanār	கல்லாடனார்	Akananuru (9, 83, 113, 171, 199, 209, 333), Kurunthogai (260, 269), Purananuru (23, 25, 371, 385, 391)	
100	Kallampālanār	கள்ளம்பாளனார்	Natrinai (148)	Authored a sole Sangam verse
101	Kallikudi Pootham Pullanār	கள்ளிக்குடிப் பூதம் புல்லனார்	Natrinai (333)	Authored a sole Sangam verse
102	Kallil Āthiraiyanār	கள்ளில் ஆத்திரையனார்	Kurunthogai (293), Purananuru (175, 389)	
103	Kalporu Sirunuraiyār	கல்பொரு சிறுநுரையார்	Kurunthogai (290)	Authored a sole Sangam verse
104	Kāmakkani Pasalaiyār	காமக்கணிப் பசலையார்	Natrinai (243)	
105	Kāmanchēr Kulathār	காமஞ்சேர் குளத்தார்	Kurunthogai (4)	Authored a sole Sangam verse
106	Kanakkayanār	கணக்காயனார்	Natrinai (23)	Authored a sole Sangam verse
107	Kanakkāyar Thathanār	கணக்காயர் தத்தனார்	Kurunthogai (304)	Authored a sole Sangam verse
108	Kangul Vellathār	கங்குல் வெள்ளத்தார்	Kurunthogai (387)	Authored a sole Sangam verse
109	Kani Punkundranār	கணி புன்குன்றனார்	Natrinai (226)	Authored a sole Sangam verse
110	Kaniyan Poonkundranār	கணியன் பூங்குன்றனார்	Purananuru (192)	Authored a sole Sangam verse
111	Kannakanār	கண்ணகனார்	Natrinai (79), Purananuru (218)	
112	Kannakāran Kotranār	கண்ணகாரன் கொற்றனார்	Natrinai (143)	Authored a sole Sangam verse
113	Kannam Pullanār	கண்ணம் புல்லனார்	Akananuru (63), Natrinai (159)	
114	Kannanār	கண்ணனார்	Kurunthogai (244)	Authored a sole Sangam verse
115	Kannankotranār	கண்ணங் கொற்றனார்	Natrinai (156)	Authored a sole Sangam verse
116	Kanthakkannanār	கந்தக்கண்ணனார்	Kurunthogai (94)	Authored a sole Sangam verse
117	Kantharathanār	கந்தரத்தனார்	Natrinai (116, 146, 238)	
118	Kapilar	கபிலர்	Ainkurunuru (201–300), Akananuru (2, 12, 18, 42, 82, 118, 128, 158, 182, 203, 218, 238, 248, 278, 292, 318, 332, 382), Kurunthogai (13, 18, 25, 38, 42, 87, 95, 100, 106, 115, 121, 142, 153, 187, 198, 208, 225, 241, 246, 249, 264, 288, 291, 312, 355, 357, 361, 385), Natrinai (1, 13, 32, 59, 65, 77, 217, 222, 225, 253, 267, 291, 309, 320, 336, 353, 359, 368, 373, 376), Purananuru (8, 14, 105–111, 113–124, 143, 200–202, 236, 337, 347), Pathitrupathu (71–80), Kurincippattu, Kalithogai (37–65)	Kapilar's authorship of the Kurinchippattu is debated. Several scholars attribute all the poems in the later anthology Kalithokai to one poet, possibly Nallanthuvanār, and believe that they were erroneously assigned to five poets (Pālai to Pālai Pādiya Perunkadunkō, Kurinji to Kapilar, Marutham to Maruthan Ilanākanār, Mullai to Chōlan Nalluruthiran, and Neythal to Nallanthuvanār) due to later venpā.
119	Kāppiyan Chēnthanār	காப்பியஞ் சேந்தனார்	Natrinai (246)	Authored a sole Sangam verse
120	Kāppiyātru Kāppiyanār	காப்பியாற்றுக் காப்பியனார்	Pathitrupathu (31–40)	
121	Kārikilār	காரிகிழார்	Purananuru (6)	Authored a sole Sangam verse
122	Kārikkannanār	காரிக்கண்ணனார்	Natrinai (237)	Authored a sole Sangam verse
123	Karumpillai Poothanār	கரும்பிள்ளைப் பூதனார்	Paripaadal (10)	Authored a sole Sangam verse
124	Karunkulal Āthanār	கருங்குழல் ஆதனார்	Purananuru (7, 224)	
125	Karuvūr Chēramān Sathanār	கருவூர்ச் சேரமான் சாத்தனார்	Kurunthogai (268)	Authored a sole Sangam verse
126	Karuvūr Kalinkathār	கருவூர் கலிங்கத்தார்	Akananuru (183)	Authored a sole Sangam verse
127	Karuvūr Kannam Pullanār	கருவூர்க் கண்ணம்புல்லனார்	Akananuru (63)	Authored a sole Sangam verse
128	Karuvūr Kannampalanār	கருவூர்க் கண்ணம்பாளனார்	Akananuru (180, 263)	
129	Karuvūr Kathapillai	கருவூர்க் கதப்பிள்ளை	Kurunthogai (64, 265, 380), Purananuru (380)	
130	Karuvūr Kathapillai Sāthanār (also known as Karuvūr Kanthapillai Sathanār)	கருவூர்க் கதப்பிள்ளைச் சாத்தனார் (கருவூர்க் கந்தப்பிள்ளை சாத்தனார்)	Akananuru (309), Natrinai (343), Purananuru (168)	
131	Karuvūr Kilār	கருவூர் கிழார்	Kurunthogai (170)	Authored a sole Sangam verse
132	Karuvūr Kosanar	கருவூர்க் கோசனார்	Natrinai (214)	Authored a sole Sangam verse
133	Karuvūr Nanmārpan	கருவூர் நன்மார்பன்	Akananuru (277)	Authored a sole Sangam verse
134	Karuvūr Ōthagnāniyār	கருவூர் ஓதஞானியார்	Kurunthogai (71)	Authored a sole Sangam verse
135	Karuvūr Pavuthiranār	கருவூர் பவுத்திரனார்	Kurunthogai (162)	Authored a sole Sangam verse
136	Karuvūr Perumchathukkathu Poothanākanār	கருவூர்ப் பெருஞ்சதுக்கத்துப் பூதநாதனார்	Purananuru (219)	Authored a sole Sangam verse
137	Karuvūr Poothanchāthanār	கருவூர் பூதஞ்சாத்தனார்	Akananuru (50)	Authored a sole Sangam verse
138	Kāsipan Keeranār	காசிபன் கீரனார்	Natrinai (248)	Authored a sole Sangam verse
139	Kathaiyankannanār	கதையங்கண்ணனார்	Purananuru (356)	Authored a sole Sangam verse
140	Kathapillaiyār	கதப் பிள்ளையார்	Natrinai (135)	Authored a sole Sangam verse
141	Kāttūr Kilār Makanār	காட்டூர் கிழார் மகனார்	Akananuru (85)	Authored a sole Sangam verse
142	Kavai Makanār	கவை மகனார்	Kurunthogai (324)	Authored a sole Sangam verse
143	Kāvanmullai Poothanār	காவன்முல்லைப் பூதனார்	Akananuru (21, 241, 293, 391), Kurunthogai (104, 211), Natrinai (274)	
144	Kāvanmullai Pootharathanār	காவன்முல்லைப் பூதரத்தனார்	Akananuru (151)	Authored a sole Sangam verse
145	Kāvarpendu	காவற்பெண்டு	Purananuru (86)	Authored a sole Sangam verse
146	Kāvattanār	காவட்டனார்	Akananuru (378)	Authored a sole Sangam verse
147	Kāviripoompattinathu Chenkannanār	காவிரிப்பூம்பட்டினத்துச் செங்கண்ணனார்	Akananuru (103, 271), Natrinai (389)	
148	Kāviripoompattinathu Chēntham Kannanār	காவிரிப்பூம்பட்டினத்துச் சேந்தங்கண்ணனார்	Kurunthogai (347)	Authored a sole Sangam verse
149	Kāviripoompattinathu Kantharathanār	காவிரிப்பூம்பட்டினத்துக் கந்தரத்தனார்	Kurunthogai (342)	Authored a sole Sangam verse
150	Kāviripoompattinathu Kārikkannanār	காவிரிப்பூம்பட்டினத்துக் காரிக்கண்ணனார்	Akananuru (107, 123, 285), Kurunthogai (297), Purananuru (57, 58, 169, 171, 353)	
151	Kāviripoompattinathu Pon Vanigar Maganār Nabbodhanār	காவிரிப்பூம்பட்டினத்துப் பொன் வணிகர் மகனார் நப்பூதனார்	Mullaipaattu	Authored a sole Sangam verse
152	Kāvittanār	காவிட்டனார்	Purananuru (359)	Authored a sole Sangam verse
153	Kavuthaman Sāthēvanār	கவுதமன் சாதேவனார் (ஆமூர் கவுதமன் சாதேவனார்)	Akananuru (159)	Authored a sole Sangam verse
154	Kayamanār	கயமனார்	Akananuru (7, 17, 145, 189, 195, 219, 221, 259, 275, 321, 383, 397), Kurunthogai (9, 356, 378, 396), Natrinai (12, 198, 279, 293, 305, 324), Purananuru (254, 361)	
155	Kayathūr Kilār	கயத்தூர் கிழார்	Kurunthogai (354)	Authored a sole Sangam verse
156	Keerankeeranār	கீரங்கீரனார்	Natrinai (78)	Authored a sole Sangam verse
157	Keeranthaiyār	கீரந்தையார்	Paripaadal (2)	Authored a sole Sangam verse
158	Keerathanār	கீரத்தனார்	Natrinai (42)	Authored a sole Sangam verse
159	Kesavanār	கேசவனார்	Paripaadal (14)	Authored a sole Sangam verse
160	Kidangil Kāvithi Perunkotranār	கிடங்கில் காவிதிப் பெருங்கொற்றனார்	Natrinai (364)	Authored a sole Sangam verse
161	Kidangil Kāvithikeerankannanār	கிடங்கில் காவிதிக் கீரங்கண்ணனார்	Natrinai (218)	Authored a sole Sangam verse
162	Kidangil Kulapathi Nakkannanār	கிடங்கில் குலபதி நக்கண்ணனார்	Kurunthogai (252)	Authored a sole Sangam verse
163	Killi Mangalankilār	கிள்ளிமங்கலங்கிழார்	Kurunthogai (76, 110, 152, 181)	
164	Killi Mangalankilār Makanār Chērakovanār	கிள்ளிமங்கலங்கிழார் மகனார் சேரகோவனார்	Natrinai (365)	Authored a sole Sangam verse
165	Kōdai Pādiya Perumpoothanār	கோடை பாடிய பெரும்பூதனார்	Purananuru (259)	Authored a sole Sangam verse
166	Kodiyūr Kilār Makanār Neythal Thathanār	கொடியூர் கிழார் மகனார் நெய்தற்றத்தனார்	Akananuru (243)	Authored a sole Sangam verse
167	Kōkulamutranār	கோக்குளமுற்றனார்	Kurunthogai (98), Natrinai (96)	
168	Kōli Kotranār	கோழிக் கொற்றனார்	Kurunthogai (276)	Authored a sole Sangam verse
169	Kōliyur Kilār Makanār Cheliyanār	கோளியூர் கிழார் மகனார் செழியனார்	Natrinai (383)	
170	Kollam Pakkanār	கொள்ளம்பக்கனார்	Natrinai (147)	Authored a sole Sangam verse
171	Kollan Alisiyār	கொல்லன் அழிசியார்	Kurunthogai (26, 138, 145, 240)	
172	Kolli Kannanār	கொல்லிக் கண்ணனார்	Kurunthogai (34)	Authored a sole Sangam verse
173	Kōnāttu Erichalūr Mādalan Madhurai Kumaranār	கோனாட்டு எறிச்சலூர் மாடலன் மதுரைக் குமரனார்	Purananuru (54, 61, 167, 180, 197, 394)	
174	Kondimankalathu Vāthuli Narchēnthanār	கொடிமங்கலத்து வாதுளி நற்சேந்தனார்	Akananuru (179, 232)	
175	Kōnmā Nedunkottanār	கோண்மா நெடுங்கோட்டனார்	Natrinai (40)	Authored a sole Sangam verse
176	Koodalūr Kilār	கூடலூர் கிழார்	Kurunthogai (166, 167, 214), Purananuru (229)	
177	Koodalūr Palkannanār	கூடலூர்ப் பல்கண்ணனார்	Natrinai (200, 380)	
178	Kookai Kōliyār	கூகைக் கோழியார்	Purananuru (364)	Authored a sole Sangam verse
179	Kootrankumaranār	கூற்றங்குமரனார்	Natrinai (244)	Authored a sole Sangam verse
180	Koovan Mainthanār	கூவன் மைந்தனார்	Kurunthogai (224)	Authored a sole Sangam verse
181	Kōperunchōlan	கோப்பெருஞ்சோழன்	Purananuru (214, 215, 216), Kurunthogai (20, 53, 129, 147)	
182	Kōtampalathu Thunjiya Chēramān	கோட்டம்பலத்துத் துஞ்சிய சேரமான்	Akananuru (168)	Authored a sole Sangam verse
183	Kōthamanār	கோதமனார்	Purananuru (366)	Authored a sole Sangam verse
184	Kotranār	கொற்றனார்	Kurunthogai (218, 358), Natrinai (30)	
185	Kotrankotranār	கொற்றங்கொற்றனார்	Akananuru (54), Natrinai (259)	
186	Kōttampalavanār	கோட்டம்பலவனார்	Natrinai (95)	Authored a sole Sangam verse
187	Kōttiyur Nallanthaiyār	கோட்டியூர் நல்லந்தையார்	Natrinai (211)	Authored a sole Sangam verse
188	Kōvarthanār	கோவர்த்தனார்	Kurunthogai (66, 194)	
189	Kōvēngai Perunkathavanār	கோவேங்கைப் பெருங்கதவனார்	Kurunthogai (134)	Authored a sole Sangam verse
190	Kōvūr Kilār	கோவூர் கிழார்	Kurunthogai (65), Purananuru (31–33, 41, 44–47, 68, 70, 308, 373, 382, 386, 400), Natrinai (393)	
191	Kudapulaviyanār	குடபுலவியனார்	Purananuru (18, 19)	
192	Kudavāyil Keeranakkanār	குடவாயில் கீரனக்கனார்	Kurunthogai (79)	Authored a sole Sangam verse
193	Kudavāyil Keerathanār	குடவாயில் கீரத்தனார்	Akananuru (35, 60, 79, 119, 129, 287, 315, 345, 366, 385), Natrinai (27, 212, 379), Kurunthogai (281, 369), Purananuru (242)	
194	Kulampanār	குளம்பனார்	Natrinai (288)	Authored a sole Sangam verse
195	Kulampanthāyanār	குளம்பந்தாயனார்	Purananuru (253)	Authored a sole Sangam verse
196	Kulatrathanār	குழற்றத்தனார்	Kurunthogai (242)	Authored a sole Sangam verse
197	Kumattoor Kannanār	குமட்டூர் கண்ணனார்	Pathitrupathu (11–20)	
198	Kumili Gnālalār Nappasalaiyār	குமிழி ஞாழலார் நப்பசலையார்	Akananuru (160)	Authored a sole Sangam verse
199	Kundriyanār	குன்றியனார்	Akananuru (40, 41), Kurunthogai (50, 51, 117, 238, 301, 336), Natrinai (117, 239)	
200	Kundrukat Pāliyāthanār	குன்றுகட் பாலியாதனார்	Purananuru (387)	Authored a sole Sangam verse
201	Kundrūr Kilār Makanār	குன்றூர் கிழார் மகனார்	Purananuru (338)	Authored a sole Sangam verse
202	Kundrūr Kilār Makanār Kannathanār	குன்றூர் கிழார் மகனார் கண்ணத்தனார்	Natrinai (332)	Authored a sole Sangam verse
203	Kundukat Paliyāthanār	குண்டுகட் பாலியாதனார்	Natrinai (220)	Authored a sole Sangam verse
204	Kuppaikōliyār	குப்பைக்கோழியார்	Kurunthogai (305)	Authored a sole Sangam verse
205	Kuramakal Ilaveyini	குறமகள் இளவெயினி	Purananuru (157)	Authored a sole Sangam verse
206	Kuramakal Kuriyeyini	குறமகள் குறியெயினியார்	Natrinai (357)	Authored a sole Sangam verse
207	Kuriyiraiyār	குறியிரையார்	Kurunthogai (394)	Authored a sole Sangam verse
208	Kurumpoothanār (also known as Kunrampoothanār)	குறும்பூதனார் (குன்றம்பூதனார்)	Paripaadal (9, 18)	
209	Kurungudi Maruthanār	குறுங்குடி மருதனார்	Akananuru (4), Kurunthogai (344)	
210	Kurunkeeranār	குறுங்கீரனார்	Kurunthogai (382)	Authored a sole Sangam verse
211	Kurunkōliyūr Kilār	குறுங்கோழியூர் கிழார்	Purananuru (17, 20, 22)	
212	Kuruvaluthiyār	குறுவழுதியார்	Akananuru (150)	Authored a sole Sangam verse
213	Kuthirai Thariyanār	குதிரைத் தறியனார்	Natrinai (296)	Authored a sole Sangam verse
214	Kuttuvan Kannanār	குட்டுவன் கண்ணனார்	Kurunthogai (179)	Authored a sole Sangam verse
215	Kuttuvan Keeranār	குட்டுவன் கீரனார்	Purananuru (240)	Authored a sole Sangam verse
216	Madal Pādiya Māthankeeranār	மடல் பாடிய மாதங்கீரனார்	Kurunthogai (182), Natrinai (377)	
217	Mādalūr Kilār	மாடலூர் கிழார்	Kurunthogai (150)	Authored a sole Sangam verse
218	Madhurai Alakkar Gnālalār Makanār Mallanār	மதுரை அளக்கர் ஞாழலார் மகனார் மள்ளனார்	Akananuru (33, 144, 174, 244, 314, 344, 353), Kurunthogai (188, 215), Natrinai (297, 321), Purananuru (388)	Written as Madhurai Mallanār in Akananuru verse 244
219	Madhurai Āruliya Nāttu Ālampēri Sāthanār	மதுரை ஆருலவிய நாட்டு ஆலம்பேரி சாத்தனார்	Natrinai (303, 338)	
220	Madhurai Aruvai Vānikan Ilavēttanār	மதுரை அறுவை வாணிகன் இளவேட்டனார்	Akananuru (56, 272, 302, 124, 254, 230), Kurunthogai (185), Natrinai (344), Purananuru (329)	
221	Madhurai Āsiriyar Kōdan Kotranār	மதுரை ஆசிரியர் கோடன் கொற்றனார்	Kurunthogai (144)	
222	Madhurai Āsiriyār Nallanthuvanār (also known as Nallanthuvanār)	மதுரை ஆசிரியர் நல்லந்துவனார் (நல்லந்துவனார்)	Akananuru (43), Natrinai (88), Paripaadal (6, 8, 11, 20), Kalithogai (118–150)	Several scholars attribute all the poems in the later anthology Kalithokai to one poet, possibly Nallanthuvanār, and believe that they were erroneously assigned to five poets (Pālai to Pālai Pādiya Perunkadunkō, Kurinji to Kapilar, Marutham to Maruthan Ilanākanār, Mullai to Chōlan Nalluruthiran, and Neythal to Nallanthuvanār) due to later venpā.
223	Madhurai Chenkannanār	மதுரை செங்கண்ணனார்	Akananuru (39)	Authored a sole Sangam verse
224	Madhurai Eelathu Poothanthēvanār (also known as Eelathu Poothanthēvanār)	மதுரை ஈழத்துப் பூதன்தேவனார் (ஈழத்துப் பூதன்தேவனார்)	Akananuru (231, 307), Kurunthogai (189, 360), Natrinai (366)	
225	Madhurai Eluthālan	மதுரை எழுத்தாளன்	Akananuru (84)	Authored a sole Sangam verse
226	Madhurai Eluthālan Sēnthan Poothanār (also known as Sēnthan Poothanār)	மதுரை எழுத்தாளன் சேந்தன் பூதனார் (சேந்தன் பூதனார்)	Akananuru (207), Kurunthogai (90, 226, 247), Natrinai (261)	
227	Madhurai Ilampālāsiriyan Chēnthan Koothanār	மதுரை இளம்பாலாசிரியன் சேந்தன் கூத்தனார்	Akananuru (102, 108, 348), Natrinai (273), Purananuru (251)	
228	Madhurai Ilankanni Kōsikanār	மதுரை இளங்கண்ணிக் கோசிகனார்	Purananuru (309)	Authored a sole Sangam verse
229	Madhurai Ilankousikanār	மதுரை இளங்கௌசிகனார்	Akananuru (381)	Authored a sole Sangam verse
230	Madhurai Kadaiyathār Makanār Vennākanār	மதுரைக் கடையத்தார் மகனார் வெண்ணாகனார்	Kurunthogai (223)	Authored a sole Sangam verse
231	Madhurai Kallin Kadaiyathan Vennākanār	மதுரைக் கள்ளிற் கடையத்தன் வெண்ணாகனார்	Akananuru (170), Purananuru (316)	
232	Madhurai Kāmakani Nappālathanār	மதுரைக் காமக்கனி நப்பாலத்தனார்	Akananuru (204)	Authored a sole Sangam verse
233	Madhurai Kanakkāyanār	மதுரைக் கணக்காயனார்	Akananuru (27, 338, 342), Purananuru (330)	
234	Madhurai Kanakkāyanār Makanār Nakkeeranār (also known as Kanakkāyanār Makanār Nakkeerar)	மதுரைக் கணக்காயனார் மகனார் நக்கீரனார் (கணக்காயர் மகனார் நக்கீரர்)	Akananuru (93), Kurunthogai (143), Purananuru (56, 189), Tirumurugatruppadai, Nedunalvaadai	
235	Madhurai Kānchipulavar	மதுரைக் காஞ்சிப் புலவர்	Akananuru (89)	Authored a sole Sangam verse
236	Madhurai Kandarathathanār	மதுரைக் கண்டரதத்தனார்	Kurunthogai (317)	Authored a sole Sangam verse
237	Madhurai Kannanār	மதுரைக் கண்ணனார்	Kurunthogai (107)	Authored a sole Sangam verse
238	Madhurai Kannathanār	மதுரைக் கண்ணத்தனார்	Akananuru (360), Natrinai (351)	
239	Madhurai Karulaviyan Koothanār	மதுரைக் காருலவியங் கூத்தனார்	Natrinai (325)	Authored a sole Sangam verse
240	Madhurai Kathakkannanār	மதுரைக் கதக்கண்ணனார்	Kurunthogai (88)	Authored a sole Sangam verse
241	Madhurai Kavuniyan Poothathanār	மதுரைக் கவுணியன் பூதத்தனார்	Akananuru (74)	Authored a sole Sangam verse
242	Madhurai Kollam Pullanār	மதுரைக் கொல்லம் புல்லனார்	Kurunthogai (373)	Authored a sole Sangam verse
243	Madhurai Kollan Vennākanār (also known as Madhurai Pon Sey Kollan Vennākanār)	மதுரைக் கொல்லன் வெண்ணாகனார்	Akananuru (363), Natrinai (285)	
244	Madhurai Koothanār	மதுரைக் கூத்தனார்	Akananuru (334)	Authored a sole Sangam verse
245	Madhurai Maruthan Ilanākanār	மதுரை மருதன் இளநாகனார்	Akananuru (34, 59, 77, 90, 104, 121, 131, 184, 193, 206, 220, 245, 255, 269, 312, 343, 358, 365, 368, 380, 387), Kurunthogai (77, 160, 279, 367), Natrinai (194, 216, 251, 283, 290, 297, 302, 326, 341, 343, 362, 392), Purananuru (55, 349)	
246	Madhurai Maruthankilār Makanār Ilampōthanār	மதுரை மருதங்கிழார் மகனார் இளம்போத்தனார்	Kurunthogai (332)	Authored a sole Sangam verse
247	Madhurai Maruthankilār Makanār Perunkannanār	மதுரை மருதங்கிழார் மகனார் பெருங் கண்ணனார்	Akananuru (247, 364), Natrinai (388)	
248	Madhurai Maruthankilār Makanār Sokuthanār	மதுரைப் பள்ளி மருதங்கிழார் மகனார் சொகுத்தனார்	Natrinai (352)	Authored a sole Sangam verse
249	Madhurai Maruthankilār Makanār Sokuthanār	மதுரை மருதங்கிழார் மகனார் சொகுத்தனார்	Natrinai (329)	Authored a sole Sangam verse
250	Madhurai Mēlaikkadai Kannampukuthār Āyathanār	மதுரை மேலைக்கடைக் கண்ணம்புகுத்தார் ஆயத்தனார்	Purananuru (350)	Authored a sole Sangam verse
251	Madhurai Nakkeeranār	மதுரை நக்கீரனார்	Akananuru (78)	Authored a sole Sangam verse
252	Madhurai Nakkeerar	மதுரை நக்கீரர்	Akananuru (36), Purananuru (395)	
253	Madhurai Nalvelliyār (also known as Nalvelliyār)	மதுரை நல்வெள்ளியார் (நல்வெள்ளியார்)	Akananuru (32), Kurunthogai (365), Natrinai (7, 47)	
254	Madhurai Olaikkadaiyathār Nalvellaiyār	மதுரை ஓலைக்கடையத்தார் நல்வெள்ளையார்	Natrinai (250, 369)	
255	Madhurai Padaimangala Manniyār	மதுரைப் படைமங்க மன்னியார்	Purananuru (351)	Authored a sole Sangam verse
256	Madhurai Padaimangala Manniyār	மதுரைப் படைமங்க மன்னியார்	Purananuru (351)	Authored a sole Sangam verse
257	Madhurai Pālāsiriyar Chēnthan Kotranār	மதுரைப் பாலாசிரியர் சேந்தன் கொற்றனார்	Natrinai (322)	Authored a sole Sangam verse
258	Madhurai Pālasiriyar Nappālanār	மதுரைப் பாலாசிரியர் நப்பாலனார்	Akananuru (172)	Authored a sole Sangam verse
259	Madhurai Pālāsiriyār Natrāmanār	மதுரைப் பாலாசிரியர் நற்றாமனார்	Akananuru (92)	Authored a sole Sangam verse
260	Madhurai Panda Vānikan Ilanthēvanār	மதுரைப் பண்ட வாணிகன் இளந்தேவனார்	Akananuru (58, 298, 328)	
261	Madhurai Pērālavāyar	மதுரைப் பேராலவாயர்	Akananuru (87, 296), Natrinai (361), Purananuru (247, 262)	
262	Madhurai Perumaruthan Ilanākanār	மதுரைப் பெருமருதன் இளநாகனார்	Natrinai (251)	Authored a sole Sangam verse
263	Madhurai Perumaruthanār	மதுரைப் பெருமருதனார்	Natrinai (241)	Authored a sole Sangam verse
264	Madhurai Perunkollanār	மதுரைப் பெருங்கொல்லனார்	Kurunthogai (141)	Authored a sole Sangam verse
265	Madhurai Ponseykollan Vennakanār	மதுரைப் பொன்செய் கொல்லன் வெண்ணாகனார்	Akananuru (363)	Authored a sole Sangam verse
266	Madhurai Poothan Ilanākanār	மதுரைப் பூதன் இளநாகனார்	Purananuru (276)	Authored a sole Sangam verse
267	Madhurai Poovanda Nākan Vettanār	மதுரைப் பூவண்ட நாகன் வேட்டனார்	Natrinai (317)	Authored a sole Sangam verse
268	Madhurai Pōthanār	மதுரைப் போத்தனார்	Akananuru (75)	Authored a sole Sangam verse
269	Madhurai Pullankannanār	மதுரைப் புல்லங்கண்ணனார்	Akananuru (161)	Authored a sole Sangam verse
270	Madhurai Sullam Pōthanār	மதுரைச் சுள்ளம் போதனார்	Natrinai (215)	Authored a sole Sangam verse
271	Madhurai Tamil Koothan Kaduvan Mallanār	மதுரைத் தமிழ்க் கூத்தன் கடுவன் மள்ளனார்	Akananuru (354)	
272	Madhurai Tamil Koothan Nākanthēvanār	மதுரைத் தமிழ்க் கூத்தன் நாகன்தேவனார்	Akananuru (164)	Authored a sole Sangam verse
273	Madhurai Tamil Koothanār	மதுரைத் தமிழ்க் கூத்தனார்	Purananuru (334)	Authored a sole Sangam verse
274	Madhurai Thathankannanār	மதுரைத் தத்தங்கண்ணனார்	Akananuru (335)	Authored a sole Sangam verse
275	Madhurai Vēlāsān	மதுரை வேளாசான்	Purananuru (305)	Authored a sole Sangam verse
276	Madhurai Vēlathathanār	மதுரை வேளாதத்தனார்	Kurunthogai (315)	Authored a sole Sangam verse
277	Madurai Koolavānikan Cheethalai Sāthanār	மதுரைக் கூலவாணிகன் சீத்தலைச் சாத்தனார்	Akananuru (229, 306, 320), Purananuru (59)	
278	Maiyoda Kōvanār	மையோடக் கோவனார்	Paripaadal (7)	Authored a sole Sangam verse
279	Mālaimāranār	மாலைமாறனார்	Kurunthogai (245)	Authored a sole Sangam verse
280	Malaiyanār	மலையனார்	Natrinai (93)	Authored a sole Sangam verse
281	Mallanār	மள்ளனார்	Kurunthogai (72), Natrinai (204)	
282	Māmalādanār	மாமலாடனார்	Kurunthogai (46)	Authored a sole Sangam verse
283	Māmoolanār	மாமூலனார்	Akananuru (1, 15, 31, 55, 61, 65, 91, 97, 101, 115, 127, 187, 197, 201, 211, 233, 251, 265, 281, 311, 325, 331, 347, 349, 359, 393, 281, 295), Kurunthogai (11), Natrinai (14, 75)	
284	Māngudi Maruthanār (also known as Mānkudi Kilār, Madhurai Kānchi Pulavar, Kānchi Pulavanār)	மாங்குடி மருதனார் (மாங்குடி கிழார், மதுரை காஞ்சி புலவர், காஞ்சிப்புலவனார்)	Akananuru (89), Kurunthogai (164, 173, 302), Natrinai (120, 123), Purananuru (24, 26, 313, 335, 372, 396), Madurai Kaanchi	
285	Māran Valuthi	மாறன் வழுதி	Natrinai (97)	Authored a sole Sangam verse
286	Māripithiyār	மாரிப்பித்தியார்	Purananuru (251, 252)	
287	Mārkandēyanār	மார்க்கண்டேயனார்	Purananuru (365)	Authored a sole Sangam verse
288	Mārōkathu Nappasalaiyār	மாறோக்கத்து நப்பசலையார்	Natrinai (304), Purananuru (37, 39, 126, 174, 226, 280, 383)	
289	Mārōkokathu Kāmakkani Nappālathanār	மாறோகத்து காமக்கணி நப்பாலத்தனார்	Akananuru (377)	Authored a sole Sangam verse
290	Marungūr Kilār Perunkannanār	மருங்கூர் கிழார் பெருங்கண்ணணார்	Akananuru (80)	
291	Marungūr Pākai Sāthan Poothanār	மருங்கூர்ப் பாகைச் சாத்தன் பூதனார்	Akananuru (327)	Authored a sole Sangam verse
292	Marunkūr Pattinathu Chēnthan Kumaranār	மருங்கூர்ப் பட்டினத்துச் சேந்தன் குமரனார்	Natrinai (289)	Authored a sole Sangam verse
293	Marutham Pādiya Ilankadunkō	மருதம் பாடிய இளங்கடுங்கோ	Akananuru (96, 176), Natrinai (50)	
294	Maruthan Ilanākanār	மருதன் இளநாகனார்	Natrinai (21, 39, 103), Purananuru (52, 138, 139), Kalithogai (66–100)	Several scholars attribute all the poems in the later anthology Kalithokai to one poet, possibly Nallanthuvanār, and believe that they were erroneously assigned to five poets (Pālai to Pālai Pādiya Perunkadunkō, Kurinji to Kapilar, Marutham to Maruthan Ilanākanār, Mullai to Chōlan Nalluruthiran, and Neythal to Nallanthuvanār) due to later venpā.
295	Māthirathanār	மாத்திரத்தனார்	Kurunthogai (113)	Authored a sole Sangam verse
296	Matroor Kilār Makanār Kotram Kotranār	மாற்றூர் கிழார் மகனார் கொற்றங் கொற்றனார்	Akananuru (54)	Authored a sole Sangam verse
297	Māvalathanār	மாவளத்தனார்	Kurunthogai (348)	Authored a sole Sangam verse
298	Māyendanār (also known as Māyēndanār)	மாயெண்டனார் (மாயேண்டனார்)	Kurunthogai (235)	Authored a sole Sangam verse
299	Meeli Perumpathumanār	மீளிப் பெரும்பதுமனார்	Natrinai (109)	Authored a sole Sangam verse
300	Meeneri Thoondilār	மீனெறி தூண்டிலார்	Kurunthogai (54)	Authored a sole Sangam verse
301	Milai Kanthanār	மிளைக் கந்தனார்	Kurunthogai (196)	Authored a sole Sangam verse
302	Milaikilār Nalvēttanār	மிளை கிழார் நல்வேட்டனார்	Kurunthogai (341), Natrinai (210, 349)	
303	Milaipperum Kanthanār	மிளைப் பெருங் கந்தனார்	Kurunthogai (136, 204, 234)	
304	Milaivēl Thithanār	மிளை வேள் தித்தனார்	Kurunthogai (284)	Authored a sole Sangam verse
305	Moolankeeranār	மூலங்கீரனார்	Natrinai (73)	Authored a sole Sangam verse
306	Mōsi Kannathanār	மோசி கண்ணத்தனார்	Natrinai (124)	Authored a sole Sangam verse
307	Mōsi Karaiyanār	மோசிக் கரையனார்	Akananuru (260)	Authored a sole Sangam verse
308	Mōsi Keeranār	மோசி கீரனார்	Akananuru (392), Kurunthogai (59, 84), Natrinai (342), Purananuru (50, 154, 155, 156, 186)	
309	Mōsi Kotranār	மோசி கொற்றனார்	Kurunthogai (377)	Authored a sole Sangam verse
310	Mōsi Sāthanār	மோசி சாத்தனார்	Purananuru (272)	Authored a sole Sangam verse
311	Mōthāsanār	மோதாசானார்	Kurunthogai (229)	Authored a sole Sangam verse
312	Mudangi Kidantha Nedunchēralāthan	முடங்கிக் கிடந்த நெடுஞ்சேரலாதன்	Akananuru (30)	Authored a sole Sangam verse
313	Mudathirumāranār	முடத்திருமாறனார்	Natrinai (105, 228)	
314	Mudatthāmak Kanniyār	முடத்தாமக்கண்ணியார்	Porunaraatruppadai	Authored a sole Sangam verse
315	Mukkāl Āsan Nelvellaiyār	முக்கல் ஆசான் நல்வெள்ளையார்	Natrinai (272)	Authored a sole Sangam verse
316	Mulliyūr Poothiyār	முள்ளியூர்ப் பூதியார்	Akananuru (173)	Authored a sole Sangam verse
317	Muppēr Nākanār	முப்பேர் நாகனார்	Natrinai (314)	Authored a sole Sangam verse
318	Muranjiyūr Mudinākanār	முரஞ்சியூர் முடிநாகனார்	Purananuru (2)	Authored a sole Sangam verse
319	Muthukootranār	முதுகூற்றனார்	Natrinai (28, 58)	
320	Muthuvenkannanār	முதுவெங்கண்ணனார்	Natrinai (232)	Authored a sole Sangam verse
321	Nākam Pōthanār	நாகம் போத்தனார்	Kurunthogai (282)	Authored a sole Sangam verse
322	Nakkannaiyār (also known as Perunkōli Nāyakkan Makal Nakkannaiyār)	நக்கண்ணையார் (பெருங்கோழி நாயக்கன் மகள் நக்கண்ணையார்)	Akananuru (252), Natrinai (19, 87), Purananuru (83, 84, 85)	
323	Nakkeeranār	நக்கீரனார்	Akananuru (120, 249, 310, 340, 389), Kurunthogai (78, 105, 161, 266, 280, 368), Natrinai (31), Nedunalvaadai	
324	Nakkeerar	நக்கீரர்	Akananuru (57, 126, 141, 205, 227, 253, 290, 346, 369), Kurunthogai (78, 105, 161, 266, 280, 368), Natrinai (86, 197, 258, 340, 358, 367), Tirumurugatruppadai	There were several poets with the name Nakkeerar in the Sangam period (such as Nakkeerar, Nakkeeranār, Kanakkāyanār Makanar Nakkeranār)
325	Nallachuthanar	நல்லச்சுதனார்	Paripaadal (21)	Authored a sole Sangam verse
326	Nallalisiyār	நல்லழிசியார்	Paripaadal (16, 17)	
327	Nallāvūr Kilār	நல்லாவூர் கிழார்	Akananuru (86), Natrinai (154)	
328	Nalleluthiyār	நல்லெழுதியார் (நல்லெழுநியார்)	Paripaadal (13)	Authored a sole Sangam verse
329	Nalliraiyanār	நல்லிறையனார்	Purananuru (393)	Authored a sole Sangam verse
330	Nallūr Nathathanār	இடைக்கழி நாட்டு நல்லூர் நத்தத்தனார்	Sirupanatruppadai	Authored a sole Sangam verse
331	Nallūr Siru Mēthāviyār	நல்லூர்ச் சிறுமேதாவியார்	Natrinai (282)	Authored a sole Sangam verse
332	Nalvaluthiyār	நல்வழுதியார்	Paripaadal (12)	Authored a sole Sangam verse
333	Nalvettanār	நல்வேட்டனார்	Natrinai (53, 292)	
334	Nalvilakkanār	நல்விளக்கனார்	Natrinai (85)	Authored a sole Sangam verse
335	Nāmalār Makanār Ilankannanār	நாமலார் மகனார் இளங்கண்ணனார்	Kurunthogai (250)	Authored a sole Sangam verse
336	Nampi Kuttuvanār	நம்பி குட்டுவனார்	Kurunthogai (109, 243), Natrinai (145, 236, 345)	
337	Nampi Neduncheliyan	நம்பி நெடுஞ்செழியன்	Purananuru (239)	Authored a sole Sangam verse
338	Nannākaiyār	நன்னாகையார்	Kurunthogai (118, 325)	
339	Nanpalūr Sirumēthāviyār	நன்பலூர் சிறு மேதாவியார்	Akananuru (94, 394)	
340	Nappālathanār	நப்பாலத்தனார்	Natrinai (240)	Authored a sole Sangam verse
341	Nappannanār	நப்பண்ணனார்	Paripaadal (19)	Authored a sole Sangam verse
342	Naraimudi Nettaiyar	நரைமுடி நெட்டையர்	Akananuru (339)	Authored a sole Sangam verse
343	Narchēnthanār	நற்சேந்தனார்	Natrinai (128)	Authored a sole Sangam verse
344	Nariverūuth Thalaiyār	நரிவெரூஉத் தலையார்	Kurunthogai (5, 236), Purananuru (5, 195)	
345	Natramanār	நற்றமனார்	Natrinai (133)	Authored a sole Sangam verse
346	Natran Kotranār	நற்றங் கொற்றனார்	Natrinai (136)	Authored a sole Sangam verse
347	Nedumpalliyathai	நெடும்பல்லியத்தை	Kurunthogai (178)	Authored a sole Sangam verse
348	Nedumpalliyathanār	நெடும்பல்லியத்தனார்	Kurunthogai (203), Purananuru (64)	
349	Nedunkalathu Paranar	நெடுங்களத்துப் பரணர்	Purananuru (291)	Authored a sole Sangam verse
350	Neduvennilavinār	நெடுவெண்ணிலவினார்	Kurunthogai (47)	Authored a sole Sangam verse
351	Nettimaiyār	நெட்டிமையார்	Purananuru (9, 12, 15)	
352	Neythal Kārkkiyār	நெய்தல் கார்க்கியர்	Kurunthogai (55, 212)	
353	Neythal Sāythuytha Avūr Kilār	நெய்தல் சாய்த்துய்த்த ஆவூர் கிழார்	Akananuru (112)	Authored a sole Sangam verse
354	Neythal Thathathanār	நெய்தல் தத்தனார்	Akananuru (243), Natrinai (49, 130)	
355	Nikandan Kalaikōttu Thandanār	நிகண்டன் கலைக்கோட்டுத் தண்டனார்	Natrinai (382)	
356	Nochi Niyamankilār	நொச்சி நியமங்கிழார்	Akananuru (52), Natrinai (17, 208, 209), Purananuru (293)	
357	Nōy Padiyār	நோய் பாடியார்	Akananuru (67)	Authored a sole Sangam verse
358	Okkūr Māsāthanār	ஒக்கூர் மாசாத்தனார்	Akananuru (14), Purananuru (248)	
359	Okkūr Māsāthiyār	ஒக்கூர் மாசாத்தியார்	Akananuru (324, 384), Kurunthogai (126, 139, 186, 220, 275), Purananuru (279)	
360	Ollaiyan Chenkannanār	ஒல்லையாயன் செங்கண்ணனார்	Akananuru (279)	Authored a sole Sangam verse
361	Ollaiyūr Kilān Makan Perunchāthan	ஒல்லையூர் கிழான் மகன் பெருஞ்சாத்தன்	Purananuru (242, 243)	
362	Ollaiyūr Thantha Poothapandiyan	ஒல்லையூர் தந்த பூதப்பாண்டியன்	Akananuru (25), Purananuru (71)	
363	Oon Pithaiyār	ஊண் பித்தையார்	Kurunthogai (232)	Authored a sole Sangam verse
364	Oonpothi Pasunkudaiyār	ஊன்பொதி பசுங்குடையார்	Purananuru (10, 203, 370, 378)	
365	Ootiyār	ஊட்டியார்	Akananuru (68, 388)	
366	Ōr Ēr Uluvanār	ஓர் ஏர் உழவனார்	Kurunthogai (131), Purananuru (193)	
367	Ōrampōkiyār	ஓரம்போகியார்	Ainkurunuru (1–100), Akananuru (286, 316), Kurunthogai (10, 70, 122, 127, 384), Natrinai (20, 360), Purananuru (284)	
368	Ōril Pichaiyār	ஓரில் பிச்சையார்	Kurunthogai (277)	Authored a sole Sangam verse
369	Ōrōdakathu Kantharathanār	ஓரோடோகத்து கந்தரத்தனார்	Akananuru (23, 95, 191)	
370	Oru Sirai Periyanār	ஒரு சிறைப் பெரியனார்	Kurunthogai (272), Natrinai (121), Purananuru (137)	
371	Orūuthanār	ஒரூஉத்தனார்	Purananuru (275)	Authored a sole Sangam verse
372	Ōthagnāniyār	ஓதஞானியார்	Kurunthogai (227)	Authored a sole Sangam verse
373	Ōthalānthaiyār	ஓதலாந்தையார்	Ainkurunuru (301–400), Kurunthogai (12, 21, 329)	
374	Padumarathu Mōsikeeranār	படுமரத்து மோசிகீரனார்	Kurunthogai (33, 75, 383)	
375	Padumarathu Mōsikotranār	படுமாத்து மோசிகொற்றனார்	Kurunthogai (376)	Authored a sole Sangam verse
376	Pakkudukkai Nankaniyār	பக்குடுக்கை நன்கணியார்	Purananuru (194)	Authored a sole Sangam verse
377	Pālai Gouthamanār	பாலைக் கெளதமனார்	Pathitrupathu (21–30)	
378	Pālai Pādiya Perunkadunkō	பாலை பாடிய பெருங்கடுங்கோ	Akananuru (5, 99, 111, 155, 185, 223, 261, 267, 291, 313, 337, 379), Kurunthogai (16, 37, 124, 135, 137, 209, 231, 262, 283, 398), Natrinai (9, 48, 118, 202, 224, 256, 318, 337, 384, 391), Kalithogai (2–36)	Several scholars attribute all the poems in the later anthology Kalithokai to one poet, possibly Nallanthuvanār, and believe that they were erroneously assigned to five poets (Pālai to Pālai Pādiya Perunkadunkō, Kurinji to Kapilar, Marutham to Maruthan Ilanākanār, Mullai to Chōlan Nalluruthiran, and Neythal to Nallanthuvanār) due to later venpā.
379	Pālathanār	பாலத்தனார்	Natrinai (52)	Authored a sole Sangam verse
380	Panampāranār	பனம்பாரனார்	Kurunthogai (52)	Authored a sole Sangam verse
381	Pāndarankannanār	பாண்டரங்கண்ணனார்	Purananuru (16)	Authored a sole Sangam verse
382	Pāndiyan Arivudainampi	பாண்டியன் அறிவுடைநம்பி	Akananuru (28), Kurunthogai (230), Natrinai (15), Purananuru (188)	
383	Pāndiyan Ariyappadai Kadantha Neduncheliyan	பாண்டியன் ஆரியப்படை கடந்த நெடுஞ்செழியன்	Purananuru (183)	Authored a sole Sangam verse
384	Pāndiyan Enāthi Nedunkannanār	பாண்டியன் ஏனாதி நெடுங்கண்ணனார்	Akananuru (373), Kurunthogai (156)	
385	Pāndiyan Māran Valuthi	பாண்டியன் மாறன் வழுதி	Natrinai (301)	Authored a sole Sangam verse; not to be confused with another poet named Maran Valuthi
386	Pāndiyan Pannādu Thanthān	பாண்டியன் பன்னாடு தந்தான்	Kurunthogai (270)	Authored a sole Sangam verse
387	Pāndiyan Thalaiyālankanathu Cheruvendra Neduncheliyan	பாண்டியன் தலையாலங்கானத்துச் செருவென்ற நெடுஞ்செழியன்	Purananuru (72)	Authored a sole Sangam verse
388	Paranar	பரணர்	Akananuru (6, 62, 76, 116, 122, 125, 135, 142, 148, 152, 162, 178, 181, 186, 196, 198, 208, 212, 222, 226, 236, 246, 258, 262, 266, 276, 322, 326, 356, 367, 372, 376, 386, 396), Kurunthogai (19, 24, 36, 60, 73, 89, 120, 128, 165, 199, 258, 259, 292, 298, 328, 393, 399), Natrinai (6, 100, 201, 247, 260, 265, 270, 280, 300, 310, 350, 356), Purananuru (4, 63, 141, 142, 144, 145, 336, 341, 343, 348, 352, 354, 369), Pathitrupathu (41–50)	
389	Parayanār	பராயனார்	Natrinai (155)	Authored a sole Sangam verse
390	Pāri Makalir	பாரி மகளிர்	Purananuru (112)	Authored a sole Sangam verse
391	Pārkāppanār (also known as Pārakāparar)	பார்காப்பானார் (பாரகாபரர்)	Kurunthogai (254)	Authored a sole Sangam verse
392	Paroovu Mōvāy Pathumanār	பரூஉ மோவாய்ப் பதுமனார்	Kurunthogai (101)	Authored a sole Sangam verse
393	Pathadi Vaikalār	பதடி வைகலார்	Kurunthogai (323)	Authored a sole Sangam verse
394	Pathumār	பதுமனார்	Kurunthogai (6)	Authored a sole Sangam verse
395	Pāvai Kottilār	பாவை கொட்டிலார்	Akananuru (336)	Authored a sole Sangam verse
396	Pērālavāyar	பேராலவாயர்	Natrinai (51)	Authored a sole Sangam verse
397	Pēreyil Muruvalār (also known as Pēreyin Muruvalār)	பேரெயில் முறுவலார் (பேரெயின் முறுவலார்)	Kurunthogai (17), Purananuru (239)	
398	Perumpākkanār	பெரும்பாக்கனார்	Kurunthogai (296)	Authored a sole Sangam verse
399	Perumpathumanār	பெரும்பதுமனார்	Kurunthogai (7), Natrinai (2), Purananuru (199)	
400	Perunchāthanār	பெருஞ்சாத்தனார்	Kurunthogai (263)	Authored a sole Sangam verse
401	Perunchithiranār	பெருஞ்சித்திரனார்	Purananuru (158–163, 207, 208, 237, 238)	
402	Perunkannanār	பெருங்கண்ணனார்	Kurunthogai (289, 310), Natrinai (137)	
403	Perunkōli Nāyakkan Makal Nakkannaiyār	பெருங்கோழி நாய்கன் மகள் நக்கண்ணையார்	Purananuru (83, 84, 85)	
404	Perunkousikanār	பெருங்கௌசிகனார்	Natrinai (44, 139), Malaipatukataam	
405	Perunkundrūr Kilār	பெருங்குன்றூர் கிழார்	Akananuru (8), Kurunthogai (338), Natrinai (5, 112, 119, 347), Purananuru (147, 210, 211, 266, 318), Pathitrupathu (81–90)	
406	Perunthalai Sathanār	பெருந்தலைச் சாத்தனார்	Akananuru (13), Natrinai (262), Purananuru (151, 164, 165, 205, 209, 294)	
407	Perunthēvanār	பெருந்தேவனார்	Akananuru (51), Natrinai (83)	
408	Perunthōt Kurunchāthanār	பெருந்தோட் குறுஞ்சாத்தனார்	Kurunthogai (308)	Authored a sole Sangam verse
409	Peruvaluthi	பெருவழுதி	Natrinai (55, 56)	
410	Pēyanār	பேயனார்	Ainkurunuru (401–500), Akananuru (234), Kurunthogai (233, 359, 400)	
411	Pēyār	பேயார்	Kurunthogai (339)	Authored a sole Sangam verse
412	Pēymakal Ilaveyiniyār	பேய்மகள் இளவெயினியார்	Purananuru (11)	Authored a sole Sangam verse
413	Piramanār	பிரமனார்	Purananuru (357)	Authored a sole Sangam verse
414	Piramasāri	பிரமசாரி	Natrinai (34)	Authored a sole Sangam verse
415	Pirān Sāthanār	பிரான் சாத்தனார்	Natrinai (68)	Authored a sole Sangam verse
416	Pisiranthaiyār	பிசிராந்தையார்	Akananuru (308), Natrinai (91), Purananuru (67, 184, 191, 212)	
417	Ponmaniyār	பொன்மணியார்	Kurunthogai (391)	Authored a sole Sangam verse
418	Ponmudiyār	பொன்முடியார்	Purananuru (299, 310, 312)	
419	Ponnākanār	பொன்னாகனார்	Kurunthogai (114)	Authored a sole Sangam verse
420	Pōnthai Pasalaiyār	போந்தைப் பசலையார்	Akananuru (110)	Authored a sole Sangam verse
421	Poonkannanār	பூங்கண்ணனார்	Kurunthogai (253)	Authored a sole Sangam verse
422	Poonkanuthiraiyār	பூங்கணுத்திரையார்	Kurunthogai (48, 171), Purananuru (277)	
423	Pootha Thēvanār	பூதத் தேவனார்	Kurunthogai (285), Natrinai (80)	
424	Poothampullanār (also known as Pootham Pulavar)	பூதம்புல்லனார் (பூதம் புலவர்)	Kurunthogai (190)	Authored a sole Sangam verse
425	Poothanār	பூதனார்	Natrinai (29)	Authored a sole Sangam verse
426	Poothankannanār	பூதங்கண்ணனார்	Natrinai (140)	Authored a sole Sangam verse
427	Porunthil Ilankeeranār	பொருந்தில் இளங்கீரனார்	Akananuru (19, 351), Purananuru (53)	
428	Pothanār	போதனார்	Natrinai (110)	Authored a sole Sangam verse
429	Pothiyār	பொத்தியார்	Purananuru (217, 220, 221, 222, 223)	
430	Pothukkayathu Keeranthaiyār	பொதுக்கயத்துக் கீரந்தையார்	Kurunthogai (337)	Authored a sole Sangam verse
431	Pothumpil Kilān Vennkannanār	பொதும்பில் கிழான் வெண்கண்ணனார்	Akananuru (192)	Authored a sole Sangam verse
432	Pothumpil Kilār	பொதும்பில் கிழார்	Natrinai (57)	Authored a sole Sangam verse
433	Pothumpil Kilār Makanār Vennkanniyār	பொதும்பில் கிழார் மகனார் வெண்கண்ணியார்	Natrinai (375, 387)	
434	Pothumpil Pullālan Kanninār	பொதும்பில் புல்லாளங் கண்ணினார்	Akananuru (154)	Authored a sole Sangam verse
435	Poykaiyār	பொய்கையார்	Natrinai (18), Purananuru (48, 49)	
436	Pullatrūr Eyitriyanār	புல்லாற்றூர் எயிற்றியனார்	Purananuru (213)	Authored a sole Sangam verse
437	Puranāttu Perunkotranār	புறநாட்டுப் பெருங் கொற்றனார்	Akananuru (323)	Authored a sole Sangam verse
438	Purathinai Nannākanār	புறத்திணை நன்னாகனார்	Purananuru (176, 376, 379, 381, 384)	
439	Puthukayathu Vannakkan Kampūrkilar	புதுக்கயத்து வண்ணக்கன் கம்பூர்கிழார்	Natrinai (294)	
440	Queen Perunkōpendu, wife of Pāndiyan PoothaPāndiyan	பூதப் பாண்டியன் தேவி பெருங்கோப்பெண்டு	Purananuru (246)	Authored a sole Sangam verse
441	Sākālasanār	சாகலாசனார்	Akananuru (16, 270)	
442	Salliyankumaranār	சல்லியங்குமரனார்	Natrinai (141)	Authored a sole Sangam verse
443	Sangavarunār Ennum Nākaraiyar	சங்கவருணர் என்னும் நாகரையர்	Purananuru (360)	
444	Sāthanār	சாத்தனார்	Kurunthogai (249)	Authored a sole Sangam verse
445	Sāthanthaiyār	சாத்தந்தையார்	Natrinai (26), Purananuru (80, 81, 82, 287)	
446	Sathināthanār	சத்திநாதனார்	Kurunthogai (119)	Authored a sole Sangam verse
447	Seethalai Sāthanār (also known as Madhurai Seethalai Sāthanār, Madhurai Koolavānikan Seethalai Sāthanār)	சீத்தலை சாத்தனார் (மதுரைச் சீத்தலைச் சாத்தனார், மதுரைக் கூலவாணிகன் சீத்தலைச் சாத்தனார்)	Akananuru (53, 134, 229, 306, 320); Natrinai (36, 127, 339); Purananuru (59); Kurunthogai (154)	
448	Sēkampoothanār	சேகம்பூதனார்	Natrinai (69)	
449	Sellūr Kilār Makanār Perumpoothankotranār	செல்லூர் கிழார் மகனார் பெரும்பூதங்கொற்றனார்	Akananuru (250)	Authored a sole Sangam verse
450	Sellūr Kōsikan Kannanār	செல்லூர் கோசிகன் கண்ணனார்	Akananuru (66)	Authored a sole Sangam verse
451	Sellūr Kotranār	செல்லூர் கொற்றனார்	Kurunthogai (363)	Authored a sole Sangam verse
452	Sempiyanār	செம்பியனார்	Natrinai (102)	Authored a sole Sangam verse
453	Sempulapēyaneerār	செம்புலப் பெயனீரார்	Kurunthogai (40)	Authored a sole Sangam verse
454	Senkannanār	செங்கண்ணனார்	Natrinai (122)	Authored a sole Sangam verse
455	Seyalūr Ilanpon Sāthan Kotranār	செயலூர் இளம்பொன் சாத்தன் கொற்றனார்	Akananuru (177)	Authored a sole Sangam verse
456	Seythi Valluvar Perunchāthanār	செய்தி வள்ளுவர் பெருஞ்சாத்தனார்	Kurunthogai (228)	Authored a sole Sangam verse
457	Siraikkudi Ānthaiyār	சிறைக்குடி ஆந்தையார்	Kurunthogai (56, 57, 62, 132, 168, 222, 273, 300), Natrinai (16)	
458	Sirumōlikanār	சிறுமோலிகனார்	Natrinai (61)	Authored a sole Sangam verse
459	Siruventhēraiyār	சிறுவெண்தேரையார்	Purananuru (362)	Authored a sole Sangam verse
460	Thāmarpal Kannanār	தாமற்பல் கண்ணனார்	Purananuru (43)	Authored a sole Sangam verse
461	Thāmotharanār	தாமோதரனார்	Kurunthogai (92)	Authored a sole Sangam verse
462	Thanimakanār	தனிமகனார்	Natrinai (219)	Authored a sole Sangam verse
463	Thankāl Āthireyan Chenkannanār	தங்கால் ஆத்திரேயன் செங்கண்ணனார்	Natrinai (386)	Authored a sole Sangam verse
464	Thānkāl Porkollanār (also known as Thangāl Mudakkollanār, Thangāl Porkollan Vennākanār, Thankāl Mudakkotranār)	தங்கால் பொற்கொல்லனார் (தங்கால் முடக்கொல்லனார், தங்கால் பொற்கொல்லன் வெண்ணாகனார், தங்கால் முடக்கொற்றனார்)	Akananuru (48, 108, 355), Kurunthogai (217), Natrinai (313), Purananuru (326)	
465	Thāyankannanār	தாயங்கண்ணனார்	Akananuru (105, 132, 213, 237), Kurunthogai (319), Natrinai (219)	
466	Thāyankanniyār	தாயங்கண்ணியார்	Purananuru (250)	Authored a sole Sangam verse
467	Theenmathi Nākanār	தீன்மதி நாகனார்	Kurunthogai (111)	Authored a sole Sangam verse
468	Theratharanār	தேரதரனார்	Kurunthogai (195)	Authored a sole Sangam verse
469	Thēvakulathār	தேவகுலத்தார்	Kurunthogai (3)	Authored a sole Sangam verse
470	Thēvanār	தேவனார்	Natrinai (227)	Authored a sole Sangam verse
471	Thēypuri Palankayitrinār	தேய்புரிப் பழங்கயிற்றினார்	Natrinai (284)	Authored a sole Sangam verse
472	Thippu Tholār	திப்புத்தோளார்	Kurunthogai (1)	Authored a sole Sangam verse
473	Thiruthāmanār	திருத்தாமனார்	Purananuru (398)	Authored a sole Sangam verse
474	Thodithalai Viluthandinār	தொடித்தலை விழுத்தண்டினார்	Purananuru (243)	Authored a sole Sangam verse
475	Tholkapilar	தொல்கபிலர்	Akananuru (282), Kurunthogai (14), Natrinai (114, 276, 328, 399)	
476	Thondaimān Ilanthiraiyan	தொண்டைமான் இளந்திரையன்	Natrinai (106), Purananuru (185)	
477	Thondi Āmūr Sāthanār	தொண்டி ஆமூர்ச் சாத்தனார்	Akananuru (169)	Authored a sole Sangam verse
478	Thoongalēriyār	தூங்கலோரியார்	Kurunthogai (151, 295), Natrinai (60)	
479	Thumpai Sokinanār	தும்பைச் சொகினனார்	Purananuru (249)	Authored a sole Sangam verse; this poet could be Thumpisēr Keeranār according to Avvai Duraisamy
480	Thumpisēr Keeranār	தும்பிசேர் கீரனார்	Kurunthogai (61, 316, 320, 392), Natrinai (277)	Could be Thumpai Sokinanār according to Avvai Duraisamy
481	Thuraikuru Māvir Pālankotranār	துறைக்குறு மாவிற் பாலங்கொற்றனார்	Natrinai (286)	Authored a sole Sangam verse
482	Thuraiyūr Ōdai Kilār	துறையூர் ஓடை கிழார்	Purananuru (136)	Authored a sole Sangam verse
483	Ukāykkudi Kilār	உகாய்க்குடிகிழார்	Kurunthogai (63)	Authored a sole Sangam verse
484	Ukkira Peruvaluthi	பாண்டியன் உக்கிரப் பெருவழுதி	Akananuru (26), Natrinai (98)	
485	Ulōchanār	உலோச்சனார்	Akananuru (20, 100, 190, 200, 210, 300, 330, 400), Kurunthogai (175, 177, 205, 248), Natrinai (11, 38, 63, 64, 74, 131, 149, 191, 203, 223, 249, 254, 278, 287, 311, 331, 354, 363, 372, 398), Purananuru (258, 274, 377)	
486	Ulunthinaim Pulavanār	உழுந்தினைம் புலவனார்	Kurunthogai (333)	Authored a sole Sangam verse
487	Umattūr Kilār Makanār Parankotranār	உமட்டூர் கிழார் மகனார் பரங்கொற்றனார்	Akananuru (69)	Authored a sole Sangam verse
488	Umparkattu Ilankannanār	உம்பற்காட்டு இளங்கண்ணனார்	Akananuru (264)	Authored a sole Sangam verse
489	Uraiyanār	உறையனார்	Kurunthogai (207)	Authored a sole Sangam verse
490	Uraiyūr Challiyan Kumāranār	உறையூர்ச் சல்லியன் குமாரனார்	Kurunthogai (309)	Authored a sole Sangam verse
491	Uraiyūr Ēnichēri Mudamōsiyār	உறையூர் ஏணிச்சேரி முடமோசியார்	Purananuru (13, 127–135, 241, 374, 375)	
492	Uraiyūr Ilampon Vānikanār	உறையூர் இளம்பொன் வாணிகனார்	Purananuru (264)	Authored a sole Sangam verse
493	Uraiyūr Kathuvāy Sāthanār	உறையூர்க் கதுவாய்ச் சாத்தனார்	Natrinai (370)	Authored a sole Sangam verse
494	Uraiyūr Maruthuvan Thāmōtharanār	உறையூர் மருத்துவன் தாமோதரனார்	Akananuru (133, 257), Purananuru (60, 170, 321)	
495	Uraiyūr Muthukannan Sāthanār	உறையூர் முதுகண்ணன் சாத்தனார்	Kurunthogai (133), Purananuru (27, 28, 29, 30, 325)	
496	Uraiyūr Muthukootranār (also known as Uraiyūr Muthukoothanār)	உறையூர் முதுகூற்றனார் (உறையூர் முதுகூத்தனார்)	Akananuru (137, 329), Kurunthogai (353, 371), Purananuru (331)	
497	Uraiyūr Muthukotranār	உறையூர் முதுகொற்றனார்	Kurunthogai (221, 390)	
498	Uraiyūr Palkāyanār	உறையூர்ப் பல்காயனார்	Kurunthogai (374)	Authored a sole Sangam verse
499	Uraiyūr Sirukanthanār	உறையூர்ச் சிறுகந்தனார்	Kurunthogai (357)	Authored a sole Sangam verse
500	Urōdakathu Kantharathanār (also known as Urodakathu Kārathanār, Orodakathu Kanthrathanār)	உரோடகத்துக் கந்தரத்தனார் (உரோடகத்துக் காரத்தனார், ஓரோடகத்துக் கந்தரத்தனார்)	Akananuru (23, 95, 191), Kurunthogai (155), Natrinai (306)	
501	Uruthiranār	உருத்திரனார்	Kurunthogai (274)	Authored a sole Sangam verse
502	Uvarkannoor Pullankeeranār	உவர்க்கண்ணூர் புல்லங்கீரனார்	Akananuru (146)	Authored a sole Sangam verse
503	Vādā Prapanthanār	வாடாப் பிரபந்தனார்	Kurunthogai (331)	Authored a sole Sangam verse
504	Vadama Vannakkan Pērisāthanār (also known as Pērisāthanār)	வடம வண்ணக்கன் பேரிசாத்தனார் (பேரிசாத்தனார்)	Akananuru (38, 214, 242, 268, 305), Kurunthogai (81, 159, 278, 314, 366), Natrinai (25, 37, 67, 104, 199, 299, 323, 378), Purananuru (198)	
505	Vadama Vannakkan Perunchāthanār	வடம வண்ணக்கன் பெருஞ்சாத்தனார்	Purananuru (125)	Authored a sole Sangam verse
506	Vadama Vannakkan Thamotharanār	வடம வண்ணக்கன் தாமோதரனார்	Kurunthogai (85), Purananuru (172)	
507	Vadamōthankilār	வடமோதங்கிழார்	Akananuru (317), Purananuru (260)	
508	Vadanedunthathanār	வடநெடுந்தத்தனார்	Purananuru (179)	Authored a sole Sangam verse
509	Valluvar (also known as Tiruvalluvar)	வள்ளுவர் (திருவள்ளுவர்)	Tirukkural	Authored a sole work containing 1330 verses; many modern scholars consider him to be a post-Sangam poet.
510	Vānmeekiyār	வான்மீகியார்	Purananuru (358)	Authored a sole Sangam verse
511	Vannakkan Sorumarunkumaranār	வண்ணக்கன் சோருமருங்குமரனார்	Natrinai (257)	Authored a sole Sangam verse
512	Vannappura Kanthrathanār	வண்ணப்புறக் கந்தரத்தனார்	Akananuru (49), Natrinai (71)	
513	Vanparanar	வன்பரணர்	Natrinai (374), Purananuru (148, 149, 150, 152, 153, 255)	
514	Varumulaiyārithiyār	வருமுலையாரித்தியார்	Kurunthogai (176)	Authored a sole Sangam verse
515	Vāyilān Thevanār	வாயிலான் தேவனார்	Kurunthogai (103, 108)	
516	Vāyililankannanār	வாயிலிளங் கண்ணனார்	Kurunthogai (346)	Authored a sole Sangam verse
517	Veerai Veliyan Thithanār	வீரை வெளியன் தித்தனர்	Akananuru (188)	Authored a sole Sangam verse
518	Veerai Veliyanār	வீரை வெளியனார்	Purananuru (320)	Authored a sole Sangam verse
519	Vellādiyanār	வெள்ளாடியனார்	Akananuru (29)	Authored a sole Sangam verse
520	Vellai Kannathanar	வெள்ளைக் கண்ணத்தனார்	Akananuru (64)	
521	Vellai Māranār	வெள்ளை மாறனார்	Purananuru (296)	Authored a sole Sangam verse
522	Vellaikudi Nākanār	வெள்ளைக்குடி நாகனார்	Purananuru (35), Natrinai (158, 196)	
523	Vellerukkilaiyār	வெள்ளெருக்கிலையார்	Purananuru (233, 234)	
524	Velliveethiyār	வெள்ளிவீதியார்	Akananuru (45, 362), Kurunthogai (27, 44, 58, 130, 146, 149, 169, 386), Natrinai (70, 335, 348)	
525	Velliyanthinnanār	வெள்ளியந்தின்னனார்	Natrinai (101)	Authored a sole Sangam verse
526	Vēmpatrūr Kannan Koothanār	வேம்பற்றூர்க் கண்ணன் கூத்தனார்	Kurunthogai (362)	Authored a sole Sangam verse
527	Vēmpatrūr Kumaranār	வேம்பற்றூர்க் குமரனார்	Akananuru (157), Purananuru (317)	
528	Venkannanār	வெண்கண்ணனார்	Akananuru (130)	Authored a sole Sangam verse
529	Venmanipoothiyār	வெண்மணிப்பூதியார்	Kurunthogai (299)	Authored a sole Sangam verse
530	Venni Kuyathiyār	வெண்ணிக் குயத்தியார்	Purananuru (66)	Authored a sole Sangam verse
531	Vennkotranār	வெண்கொற்றனார்	Kurunthogai (86)	Authored a sole Sangam verse
532	Vennpoothanār	வெண்பூதனார்	Kurunthogai (83)	Authored a sole Sangam verse
533	Vennpoothiyār (also known as Vellūr Kilār Makanār Vennpoothiyār)	வெண்பூதியார் (வெள்ளூர்கிழார் மகனார் வெண்பூதியார்)	Kurunthogai (97, 174, 219)	
534	Veri Pādiya Kāmakanniyār	வெறி பாடிய காமக்கண்ணியார்	Akananuru (22, 98), Purananuru (271, 302), Natrinai (268)	
535	Vēttakannanār	வேட்டகண்ணனார்	Kurunthogai (389)	Authored a sole Sangam verse
536	Vilikatpēthai Perunkannanār	விழிகட்பேதைப் பெருங்கண்ணனார்	Natrinai (242)	Authored a sole Sangam verse
537	Villakaviralinār	வில்லகவிரலினார்	Kurunthogai (370)	Authored a sole Sangam verse
538	Vinaitholil Sōkeeranār	வினைத்தொழில் சோகீரனார்	Natrinai (319)	Authored a sole Sangam verse
539	Virichiyūr Nannākaiyār	விரிச்சியூர் நன்னாகனார்	Purananuru (292)	Authored a sole Sangam verse
540	Viriyūr Nakkannār	விரியூர் நக்கனார்	Purananuru (332)	Authored a sole Sangam verse
541	Vitrootru Vannakkan Thathathanār	விற்றூற்று வண்ணக்கன் தத்தனார்	Natrinai (298)	
542	Vitrūtru Mūtheyinanār	விற்றூற்று மூதெயினனார்	Akananuru (37, 136, 288), Kurunthogai (372)	
543	Vittakuthiraiyār	விட்டகுதிரையார்	Kurunthogai (74)	Authored a sole Sangam verse

== See also ==
- Third Sangam
- Sangam landscape
