= Marutthuvan Dhamodharanar =

Poet of the Sangam period

Uraiyūr Maruthuvan Thāmōtharanār (Tamil: உறையூர் மருத்துவன் தாமோதரனார்) was a poet of the Sangam period, to whom 6 verses of the Sangam literature have been attributed, including verse 11 of the Tiruvalluva Maalai.

== Biography ==
Dhamodharanar, known in full as Uraiyur Marutthuvan Dhamodharanar, lived in Uraiyur and was a physician by profession, hence came to be called thus. He was known as a worshiper of Lord Vishnu. He has sung in praise of the Chola King Kurappalli Thunjiya Perunthirumavalavan and Pittan Kottran in verses 60, 170, and 321 of the Purananuru. He is believed to be the contemporary of Sangam poets Kovoor Kilar, Madalan Madurai Kumaranar, and Kaveri Poompattanatthu Kaari Kannanar, since these poets, too, have sung on the Chola ruler.

== Contribution to the Sangam literature ==
Marutthuvan Dhamodharanar has written 6 Sangam verses, including 3 in Purananuru (verses 60, 170, and 321), 2 in Agananuru (verses 133 and 257), and 1 in Tiruvalluva Maalai (verse 11).

=== Views on Valluvar and the Kural ===
Marutthuvan Dhamodharanar opines about Valluvar and the Kural text thus:

All are relieved of their headache by smelling the sindil-salt, and sliced dry ginger mixed with honey; but Sāttanār (a fellow-professor) was relieved of his head-ache (brought on by his habit of striking his head with his stylus when he found a fault in an author) by hearing the three parts of the Cural recited. [Emphasis in original]

== See also ==
- Sangam literature
- List of Sangam poets
- Tiruvalluva Maalai
