= Pandya dynasty =

Ancient Tamil dynasty of South India

Pandyan dynasty
- c.500 BCE–1618 CE
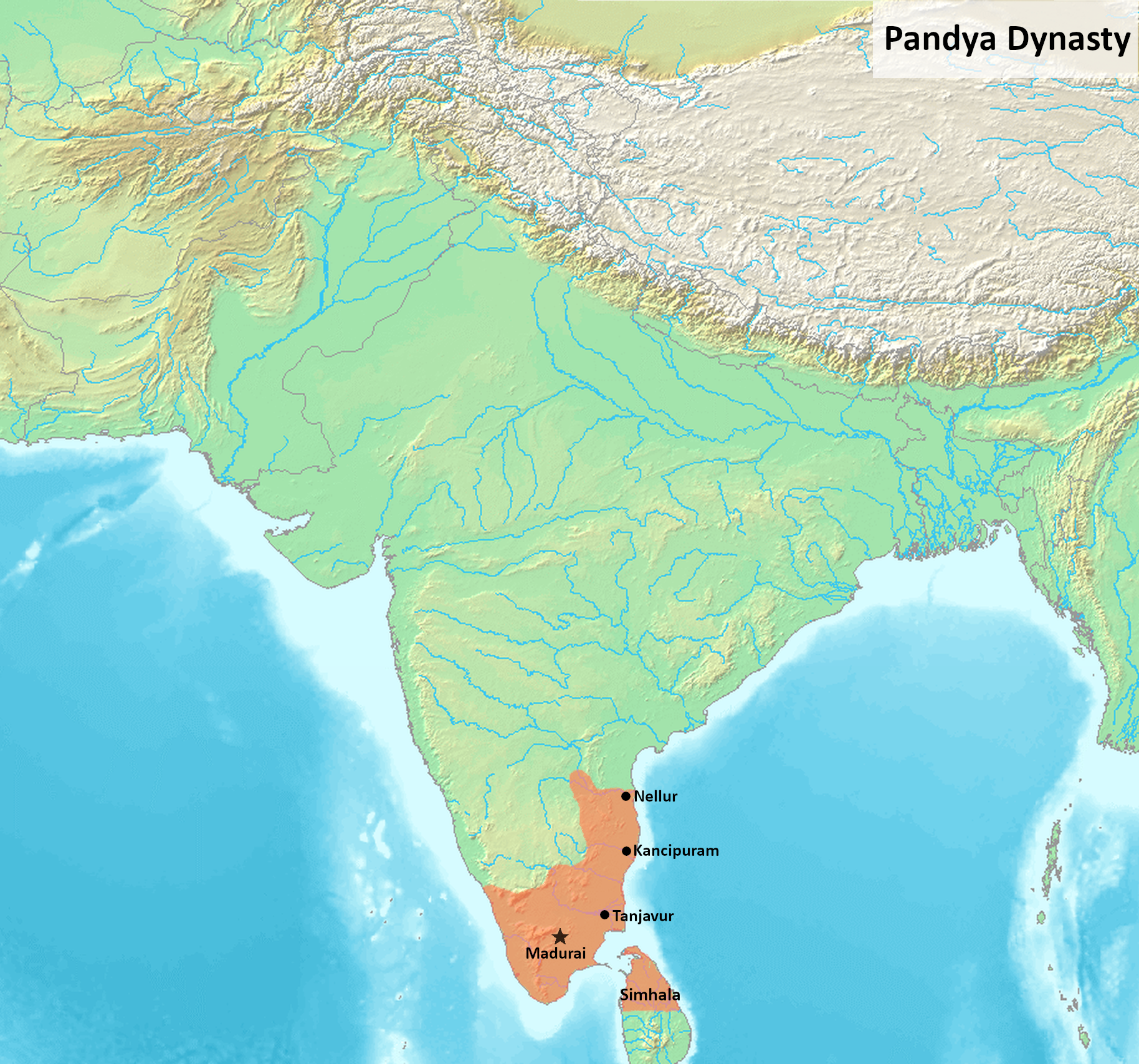
- Greatest extent of the Pandya Empire, 13th Century
- Capital: Korkai (port, early historic); Madurai (till 1335 CE); Tenkasi (1422–1618 CE)
- Official languages: Tamil
- Religion: Hinduism Jainism; Buddhism
- Demonym: Pandiyar
- Government: Monarchy
  - Around 270 BCE: Nedunjeliyan I (first documented)
  - 560–590 CE: Kadungon (Pandya revival)
  - 1613–1618 CE: Varagunarama
- Historical era: Medieval era
  - Established: c.500 BCE
  - Disestablished: 1618 CE
Succeeded by
Tenkasi Pandyas
Madurai Nayak dynasty
Vijayanagara Empire
Jaffna kingdom
- Today part of: India; Sri Lanka

The Pandya dynasty (Tamil: [paːɳɖijɐr]), also referred to as the Pandyas of Madurai, was an ancient Tamil dynasty of South India, and among the three great kingdoms of Tamilakam, the other two were the Cholas and the Cheras. Existing since at least the 5th to 3rd centuries BCE, the dynasty passed through two periods of imperial dominance, the 6th to 10th centuries CE, and under the 'Later Pandyas' (13th to 14th centuries CE). In the second half of the 13th century under Jatavarman Sundara Pandyan I and Maravarman Kulasekara Pandyan I, the Pandyas ruled extensive territories including regions of present-day South India and northern Sri Lanka through vassal states subject to Madurai. The Pandya dynasty is considered to be one of the longest ruling dynasties in the world, in power continuously from roughly 500 BCE to 1618 CE, although its territorial and administrative extent varied significantly.

The rulers of the three Tamil dynasties were referred to as the "three crowned rulers (the mu-ventar) of the Tamil Region" in the southern part of India. The origin and the timeline of the Pandya dynasty are difficult to establish. The early Pandya chieftains ruled their country (Pandya Nadu) from the ancient period, which included the inland city of Madurai and the southern port of Korkai. The Pandyas are celebrated in the earliest available Tamil poetry (Sangam literature). Graeco-Roman accounts (as early as the 4th century BCE), the edicts of Maurya emperor Ashoka, coins with legends in Tamil-Brahmi script, and Tamil-Brahmi inscriptions suggest the continuity of the Pandya dynasty from the 3rd century BCE to the early centuries CE. The early historic Pandyas faded into obscurity upon the rise of the Kalabhra dynasty in south India.

From the 6th century to the 9th century CE, the Chalukyas of Badami or Rashtrakutas of the Deccan, the Pallavas of Kanchi, and Pandyas of Madurai dominated the politics of south India. The Pandyas often ruled or invaded the fertile estuary of Kaveri (the Chola country), the ancient Chera country (Kongu and central Kerala) and Venadu (southern Kerala), the Pallava country, and Sri Lanka. The Pandyas fell into decline with the rise of the Cholas of Thanjavur in the 9th century and were in constant conflict with the latter. The Pandyas allied themselves with the Sinhalese and the Cheras against the Chola Empire until it found an opportunity to revive its frontiers during the late 13th century.

The Pandyas entered their golden age under Maravarman I and Jatavarman Sundara Pandya I (13th century). Some early efforts by Maravarman I to expand into the Chola country were effectively checked by the Hoysalas. Jatavarman I (c. 1251) successfully expanded the kingdom into the Telugu country (as far north as Nellore), south Kerala, and conquered northern Sri Lanka. The city of Kanchi became a secondary capital of the Pandyas. The Hoysalas, in general, were confined to the Mysore Plateau and even king Somesvara was killed in a battle with Pandyas. Maravarman Kulasekhara I (1268) defeated an alliance of the Hoysalas and the Cholas (1279) and invaded Sri Lanka. The venerable Tooth Relic of the Buddha was carried away by the Pandyas. During this period, the rule of the kingdom was shared among several royals, one of them enjoying primacy over the rest. An internal crisis in the Pandya kingdom coincided with the Khalji invasion of south India in 1310–11. The ensuing political crisis saw more sultanate raids and plunder, the loss of south Kerala (1312), and north Sri Lanka (1323) and the establishment of the Madurai Sultanate (1334). The Pandyas of Ucchangi (9th–13th century) in the Tungabhadra valley were related to the Pandyas of Madurai.

According to tradition, the legendary Sangams ("the Academies") were held in Madurai under the patronage of the Pandyas, and some of the Pandyan rulers claimed to be poets themselves. Pandya Nadu was home to several renowned temples, including the Meenakshi Temple in Madurai. It is known that the early Pandya rulers originally followed Jainism, while at some point they converted to Hinduism. The revival of the Pandya power by Kadungon (late 6th century CE) coincided with the prominence of the Shaivite Nayanars and the Vaishnavite Alvars.

== Etymology and origin legends ==
The etymology of Pandya is still a matter of considerable speculation among scholars. One theory is that the word pandya is derived from the ancient Tamil word "pandu" meaning "old". The theory suggests that in early historic Tamil lexicon the word pandya means old country in contrast with Chola meaning new country, Chera meaning hill country and Pallava meaning branch. Another theory is that the word Pandya is derived from the Sanskrit word Pandu to mean white or pale, in reference to king Pandu and the Pandavas. Apart from these derivations mentioned, several other theories do appear in historical studies.

Tamil legends narrate an origin myth for the three crowned kings, described by K. A. Nilakanta Sastri as a legend similar to that of Romulus and Remus. According to the myth, the three brothers Cheran, Cholan and Pandyan ruled in common at the southern city of Korkai. While Pandya remained at home, his two brothers Cheran and Cholan after a separation founded their own kingdoms in north and west. The epic poem Silappatikaram mentions that the emblem of the Pandyas was that of a fish. Indian traditions such as the Great Epics and the Puranas often associate southern India with Sage Agastya (who had his ashrama in the south). Agastya appears prominently in medieval Tamil literature also.

Ceylonese folklores attribute Alli Rani (meaning "the queen Alli") as one of the early historic rulers of the Pandyas. She is attributed as an "amazonian queen" whose servants were men and administrative officials and army were women. She is thought of ruling the whole western and northern coast of Sri Lanka from her capital Kudiramalai, where remains of what is thought of as her fort are found. She is sometimes seen as an incarnation of the Pandya associated gods, Meenakshi and Kannagi.

=== Chandravamsha ===
The medieval Pandya kings claimed to belong to the Chandravamsha or the Lunar Race. They claimed Pururavas and Nahusha as their ancestors. Pururavas is listed as one of their ancestors in the Velvikudi Inscription of Nedunjadaiyan Varaguna-varman I (Jatila Parantaka Nedunjadaiyan).

== Sources of Pandya history ==
The Greek ambassador to Chandragupta Maurya, Megasthenes mentions the Queen of the Pandyas as 'Pandaia' and locates them in the south of India extending into the ocean. It consisted of 365 villages which met the needs of the royal palace each day of the year. He described the queen Pandaie as daughter of Heracles (by some authors as Shiva or Krishna). Madurai, capital of Pandyas is mentioned in Kautilya's Arthashastra (4th century BCE) as 'Mathura of the south'.

=== Archaeological sources ===
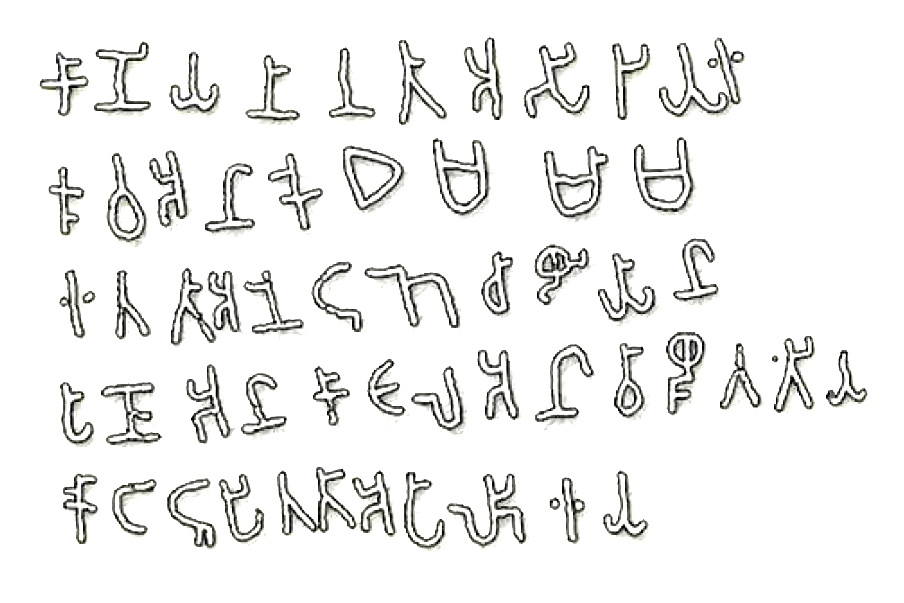
Mangulam Jain inscription (270 BCE)

Pandyas are also mentioned in the inscriptions of Maurya emperor Asoka (3rd century BCE). In his inscriptions (2nd and 13th Major Rock Edict), Asoka refers to the peoples of south India—the Cholas, the Cheras, Pandyas and Satiyaputras. These polities, possibly not part of the Maurya empire, were on friendly terms with Asoka:

The conquest by dharma has been won here, on the borders, and even six hundred yojanas (5,400–9,600 km) away, where the Greek king Antiochos rules, beyond there where the four kings named Ptolemy, Antigonos, Magas and Alexander rule, likewise in the south among the Cholas, the Pandyas, and as far as Tamraparni river.
(Major Rock Edict No.13), Ven. S. Dhammika translation

Everywhere within the conquered province of King Piyadasi (Ashoka), the beloved of the gods, as well as in the parts occupied by the faithful, such as Chola, Pandya, Satiyaputra, and Keralaputra, even as far as Tambapanni (Ceylon) and within the dominions the Greek (of which Antiochus generals are the rulers ) everywhere the heaven-beloved Raja Piyadasi’s double system of medical aid is established- both medical aid for men and medical aid for animals.
(Major Rock Edict No.2), James Prinsep translation

The earliest Pandya to be found in epigraph is Nedunjeliyan, figuring in the Tamil-Brahmi Mangulam inscription (near Madurai) assigned to 3rd and 2nd centuries BCE. The record documents a gift of rock-cut beds, to a Jain ascetic. It is assumed that the people found in the Mangulam inscription, Nedunjeliyan, Kadalan, and Izhanchadikan predate rulers such as Talaiyanganam Nedunjelyan and Palyaga-salai Mudukudimi Peruvaludi.

Kharavela, the Kalinga king who ruled during c. 1st century BCE, in his Hathigumpha inscription, claims to have destroyed an old confederacy of Tamil countries ("the tamira–desa–sanghata") which had lasted 132 years, and to have acquired a large number of pearls from the Pandyas.

Silver punch-marked coins with the fish symbol of the Pandyas dating from around the same time have also been found.

Archaeological excavations at Korkai and other coastal sites in the Pandya region have yielded Roman coins, pottery, and port remains, which support literary references to long-distance trade, including pearls.

=== Early Tamil literature ===
The early historic Pandyas are celebrated in the earliest available Tamil poetry. The poems refers to about twelve Pandya rulers. According to tradition, the legendary Sangams ("the Academies") were held in Madurai under the patronage of the Pandyas. Several Tamil literary works, such as Iraiyanar Agapporul, mention the legend of three separate Sangams and ascribe their patronage to the Pandyas.

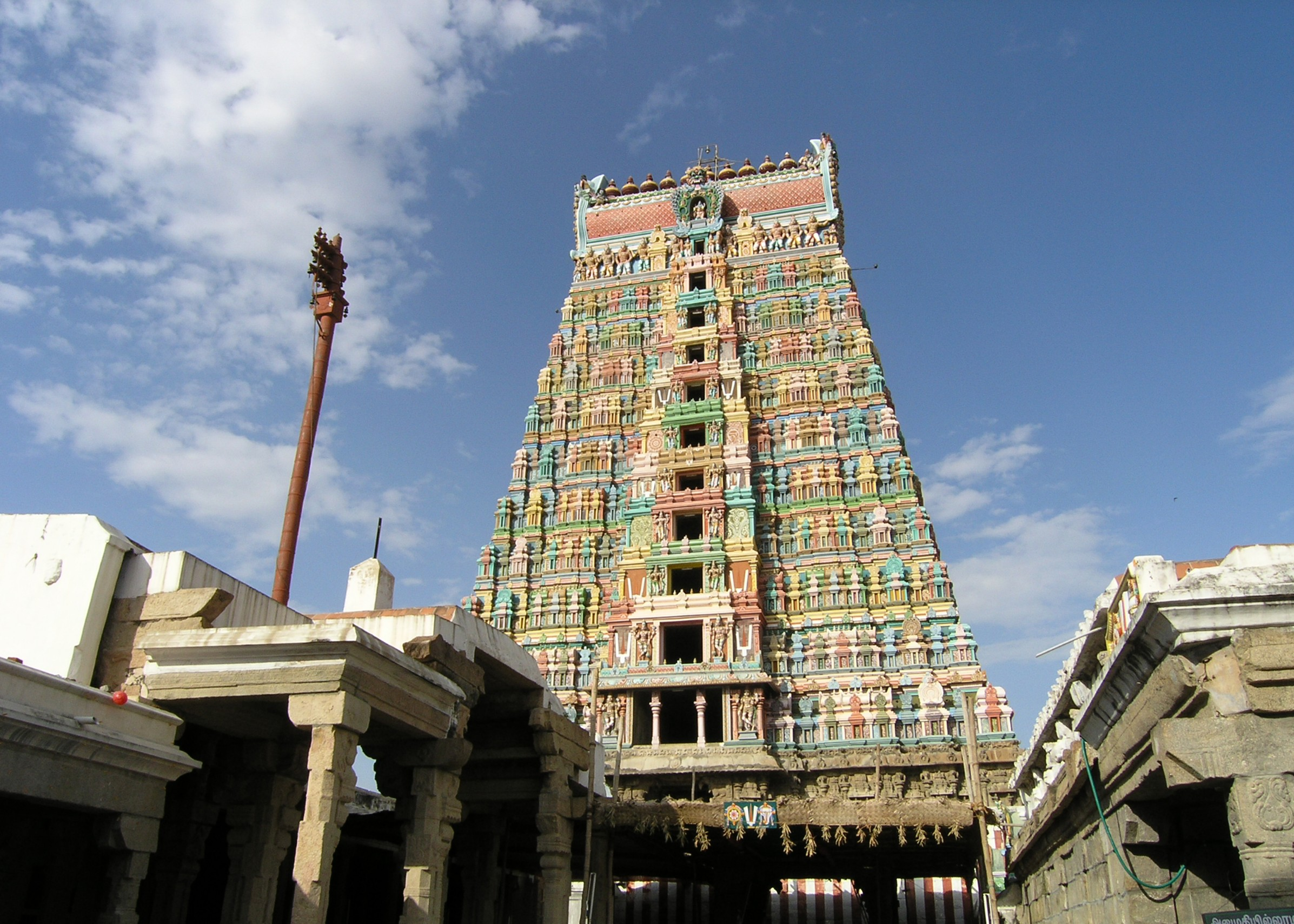
Srivilliputhur Andal temple built by Pandyas primarily, is the official emblem of Tamil Nadu.

Pandya rulers from early historic south India:

- Mudattirumaran
- Koon Pandya
- Nedunjeliyan I ("Aariyap Padai Kadantha")
- Puda-Pandya
- Palyagasalai Mudukudumi Peruvaludi
- Nedunjeliyan II("Talaiyaalanganathu Seruvendra")
- Nan Maran
- Nedunj Cheliyan III
- Maran Valudi
- Kadalan Valuthi
- Musiri Mutriya Cheliyan
- Ukkirap Peruvaludi
- Bootha Pāndiyan
- Arivudainampi

Pandya rulers—such as Nedunjeliyan, the Victor of Talaiyalanganam, and Mudukudimi Peruvaludi, the Patron of several sacrificial fires ("the Palyaga-salai")—find mention in several poems (such as Mathuraikkanci).

Besides several short poems found in the Akananuru and the Purananuru collections, there are two major works—Mathuraikkanci and Netunalvatai—which give a glimpse into the society and commercial activities in the Pandya country during the early historic period. The Purananuru and Agananuru collections contain poems sung in praise of various Pandya rulers and also poems that were claimed to be composed by the rulers themselves.

Besides the poems, king Peruvaludi is also mentioned in later copper-plate grant (8th–9th century CE). In the work Mathuraikkanci, the author Mankudi Maruthanar, refers to his patron, Talaihalanganum Nedunjeliyan, as the Lord of Korkai and the Warlord of the Southern Parathavar People. It contains a full-length description of Madurai and the Pandya country under the rule of Nedunjeliyan. In the famous battle of Talaiyalanganam (in east Tanjore), the Pandya is said to have defeated his enemies (which included the Chera and the Chola). He is also praised for his victory of Mizhalai and Mutturu, two "vel" centres along the ocean (in Pudukkottai). The Netunalvatai (in the collection of Pattupattu) by Nakkirar contains a description of king Nedunjeliyan's palace.

=== Foreign sources ===
South Asia circa 150 BCE.

The Buddhist text Mahavamsa (composed in the 5th century CE) mentions a Pandya king in the context of Prince Vijaya's (543–505 BCE) arrival in Sri Lanka with his 700 followers.

- According to the Mahavamsa, emissaries laden with precious gifts were sent from Sri Lanka to the city of Madhura in southern India. Their mission was to secure a bride for Prince Vijaya. The Pandya King of Madurai agreed to the proposal. He not only sent his own daughter to marry Prince Vijaya but also requested other families to offer their daughters to marry the prince's ministers and retainers. So, along with the Princess and hundreds of maidens, craftsmen and a thousand families from the eighteen guilds were also sent to Sri Lanka.
- Greek and Latin sources (early centuries CE) refer to the ancient Tamil country, same as the Tamilakam, as "Lymyrike" or "Damirice" (or Dymirice/Dimirixe or Damirice) and its ruling families.
- Pandyas are also mentioned by Greek author Megasthenes (4th century BCE) where he writes about the south Indian kingdom being ruled by women. He described the Pandya country in Indika as "occupying the portion of India which lies southward and extends to the sea". According to his account, the kingdom had 365 villages, each of which was expected to meet the needs of the royal household for one day in the year. He described the Pandya queen at the time, Pandaia as the daughter of Herakles.
- Pliny the Elder refers to the Pandya ruler of Madurai in general terms (first century CE).
- The author of the Periplus of the Erythraean Sea (first century CE) describes the riches of a "Pandian kingdom"
  ...Nelcynda is distant from Muziris by river and sea about five hundred stadia, and is of another kingdom, the Pandian. This place [Nelcynda] also is situated on a river, about one hundred and twenty stadia from the [Arabian] sea....
- The country of the Pandyas was described as Pandya Mediterranea and Modura Regia Pandionis by Ptolemy (c. 140 CE).
- Strabo states that an Indian king called Pandion sent Augustus Caesar "presents and gifts of honour". The 1st-century Greek historian Nicolaus of Damascus met, at Antioch, the ambassador sent by a king from India "named Pandion or, according to others, Porus" to Caesar Augustus c. 13 CE (Strabo XV.4 and 73).
- The Roman emperor Julian received an embassy from a Pandya about 361 CE.
- Chinese historian Yu Huan in his 3rd-century CE text, the Weilüe, mentions the Panyue kingdom:
  ...the kingdom of Panyue is also called Hanyuewang. It is several thousand li to the southeast of Tianzhu (northern India) ...The inhabitants are small; they are the same height as the Chinese ...
- Scholar John E. Hill identified Panyue as the Pandya kingdom. However, others have identified it with an ancient state located in modern Burma or Assam.
- The Chinese traveler Xuanzang mentions a kingdom further south from Kanchipuram, a kingdom named Malakutta, identified with Madurai described by his Buddhist friends at Kanchipuram.
- In the later part of the 13th century (in 1288 and 1293 CE) Venetian traveller Marco Polo visited the Pandya kingdom and left a vivid description of the land and its people.
  The darkest man is here the most highly esteemed and [considered] better than the others who are not so dark. Let me add that in very truth these people portray and depict their gods and their idols as black and their devils white as snow. For they say that god and all the saints are black and the devils are all white. That is why they portray them as I have described.

== History ==
=== Early historic Pandyas ===
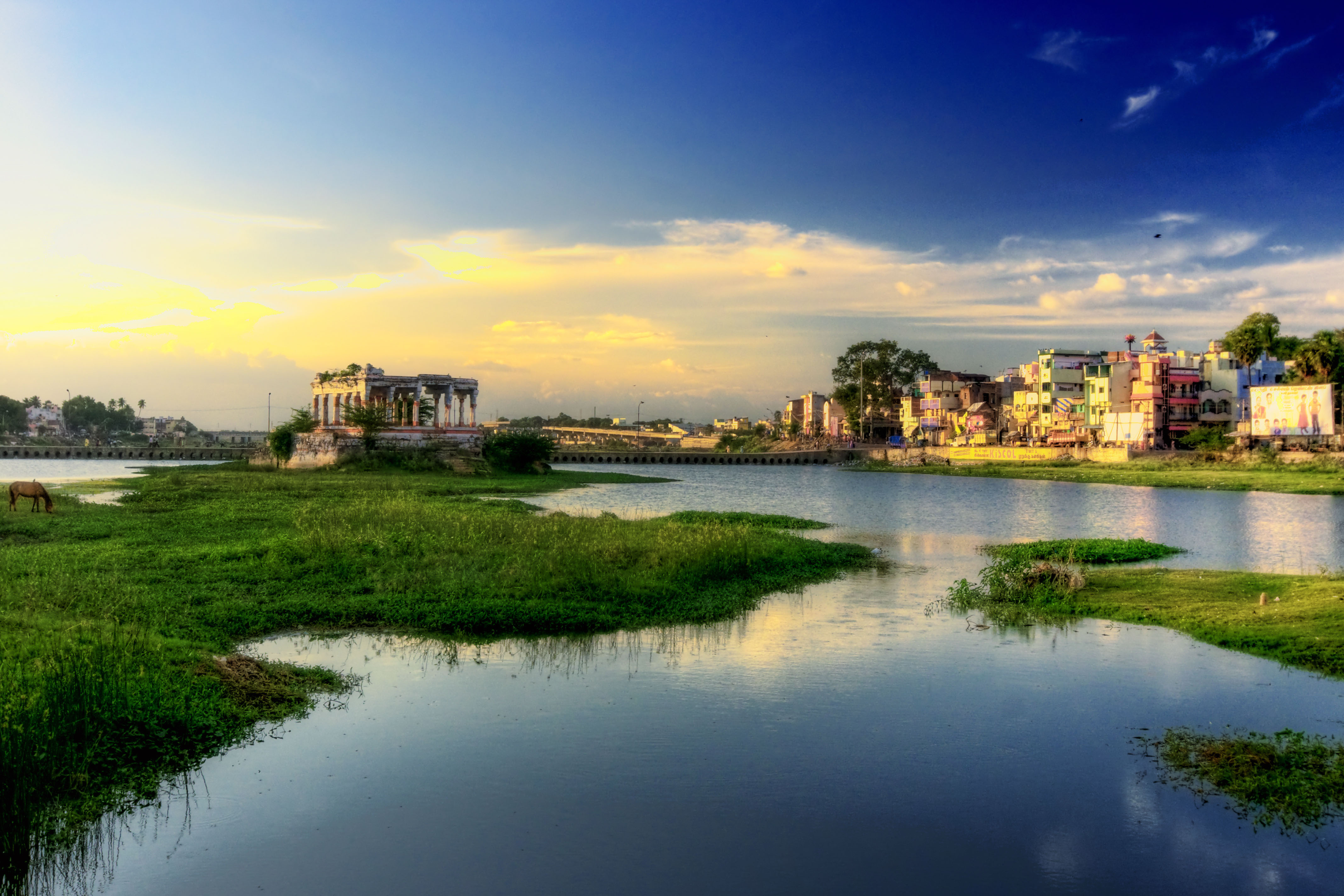
Vaigai River in Madurai

Mauryan emperor Asoka (3rd century BCE) seems to have been on friendly terms with the people of south India and Sri Lanka (the Cholas, the Pandyas, the Satiya Putras, the Kerala Putras and the Tamraparnis). There are no indications that Asoka tried to conquer the extreme south India (the Tamilakam—the Abode of the Tamils).

The three chiefly lines of early historic south India—the Cheras, Pandyas and Cholas—were known as the mu-vendar ("the three vendars"). They were traditionally based at their original headquarters in the interior Tamil Nadu (Karur, Madurai and Uraiyur, respectively). The powerful chiefdoms of the three ventar dominated the political and economic life of early historic south India. The frequent conflicts between the Chera, the Chola and the Pandya are well documented in ancient (the Sangam) Tamil poetry. The Cheras, Cholas and Pandyas also controlled the ports of Muziris (Muchiri), Korkai and Kaveri, respectively (for the trade with the Graeco-Roman world). The gradual shift from chiefdoms to kingdoms seems to have occurred in the following period.

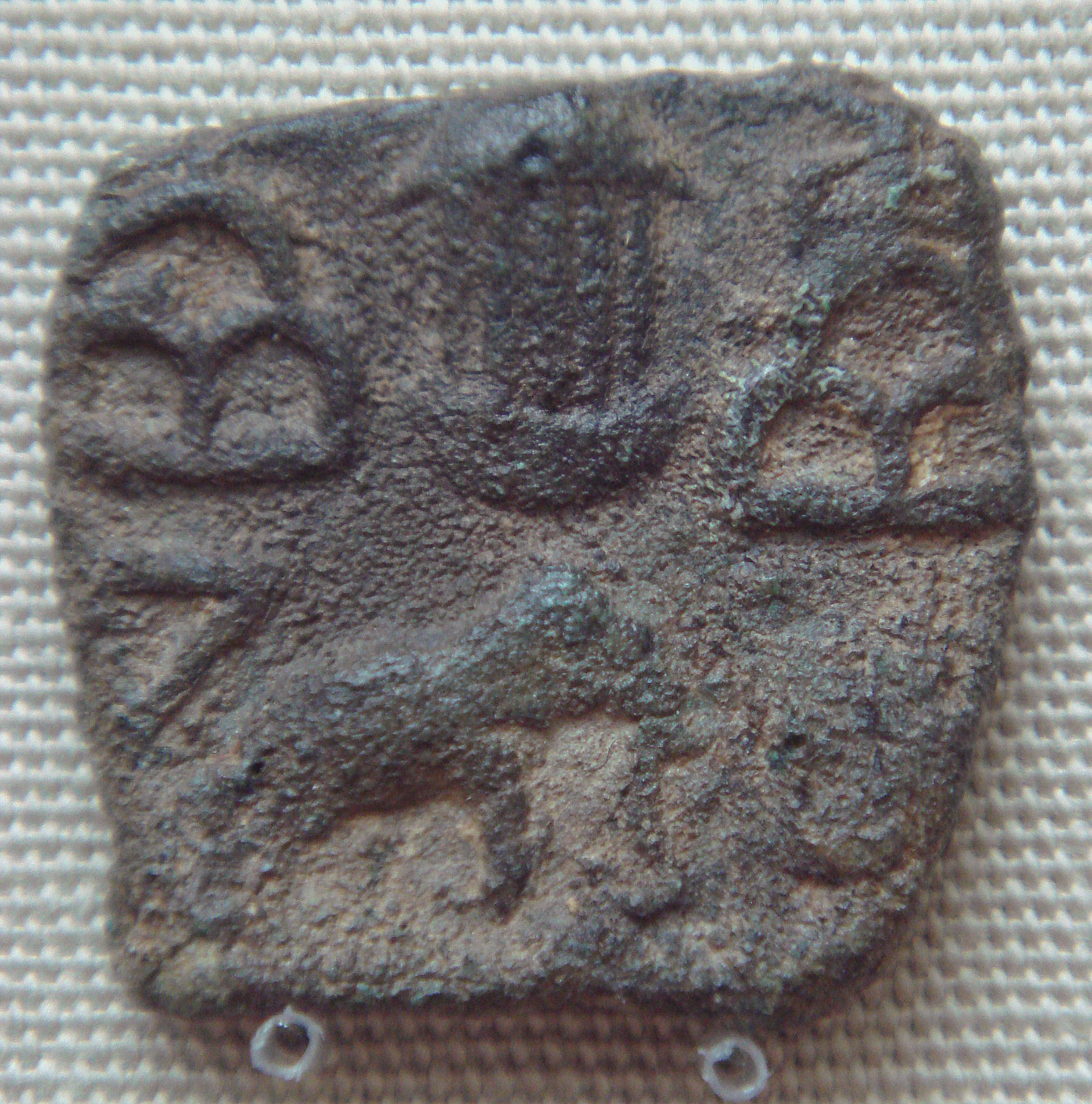
Pandya coin with temple between hills and elephant (Sri Lanka ca. 1st century CE) (British Museum)

The famous inscription of king Kharavela at Hathigumpha (mid-first century BCE) mentions the defeat of a confederacy of the "Tramira" countries which had been a threat to Kalinga. It also remembers the precious pearls brought to the capital as booty from the "Pandya" realm. The Pandya chiefdom was famous for its pearl fisheries and silk industry. Korkai and Alagankulam are believed to have been the exchange centres of the Pandyas. Korkai, a port at the mouth of the river Tambraparni, was linked to the famous pearl fisheries and Alagankulam was also developed as a port.

Several coins attributed to the early historic Pandyas are found in the region. Inscriptions, datable to c. 2nd century BCE, recording royal grants—both from royals and wealthy commoners—were also discovered from the Pandya country.

The Pandyas seem to be the most prominent of the three "ventar" rulers. There are even references to a Pandya queen from 3rd century BCE representing a confederacy of the Tamil countries. Madurai, in south Tamil Nadu, was the most important cultural centre in south India as the core of the Tamil speakers. Megalithic relics such as menhirs, dolmens, urn burials, stone circles and rock-cut chambers/passages can be found in south India. Burial goods include iron objects, ivory ornaments, Black-and-Red Ware and even some Roman Imperial coins. The so-called "velir" hill chieftains are assumed to be associated with these megalithic burials.

Greek and Latin accounts (early centuries CE), coins with legends in Tamil-Brahmi script, and Tamil-Brahmi inscriptions suggest the continuity of the Pandya dynasty from the 3rd century BCE to early centuries CE. The early Pandyas, along with the Cheras and the Cholas, were eventually displaced by the Kalabhra dynasty.

=== Medieval Pandyas ===
==== Pandya revival (7th–10th centuries CE) ====
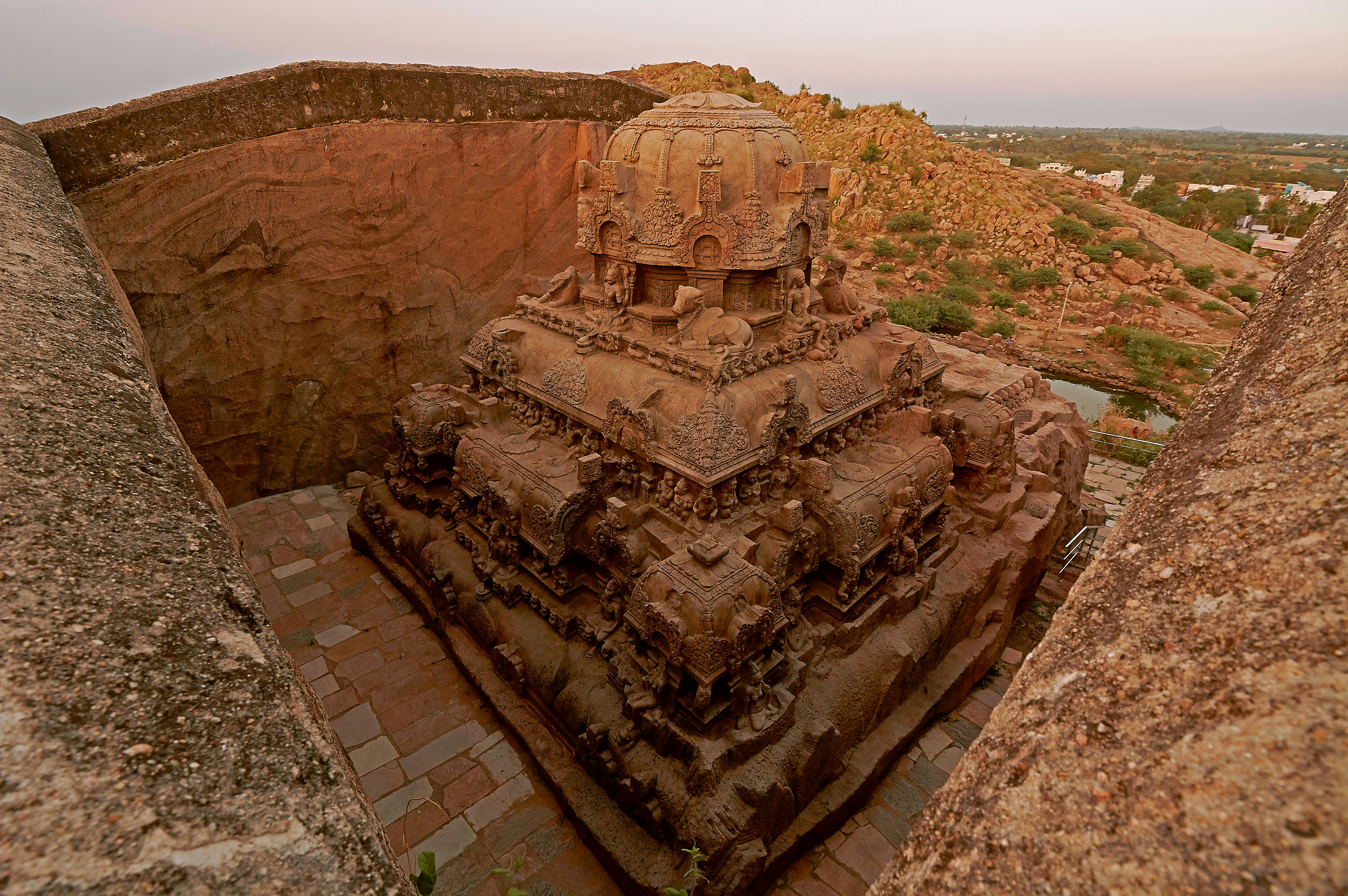
Vettuvan Koil, Kalugumalai, Tuticorin. Pandya kingdom, 8th century CE

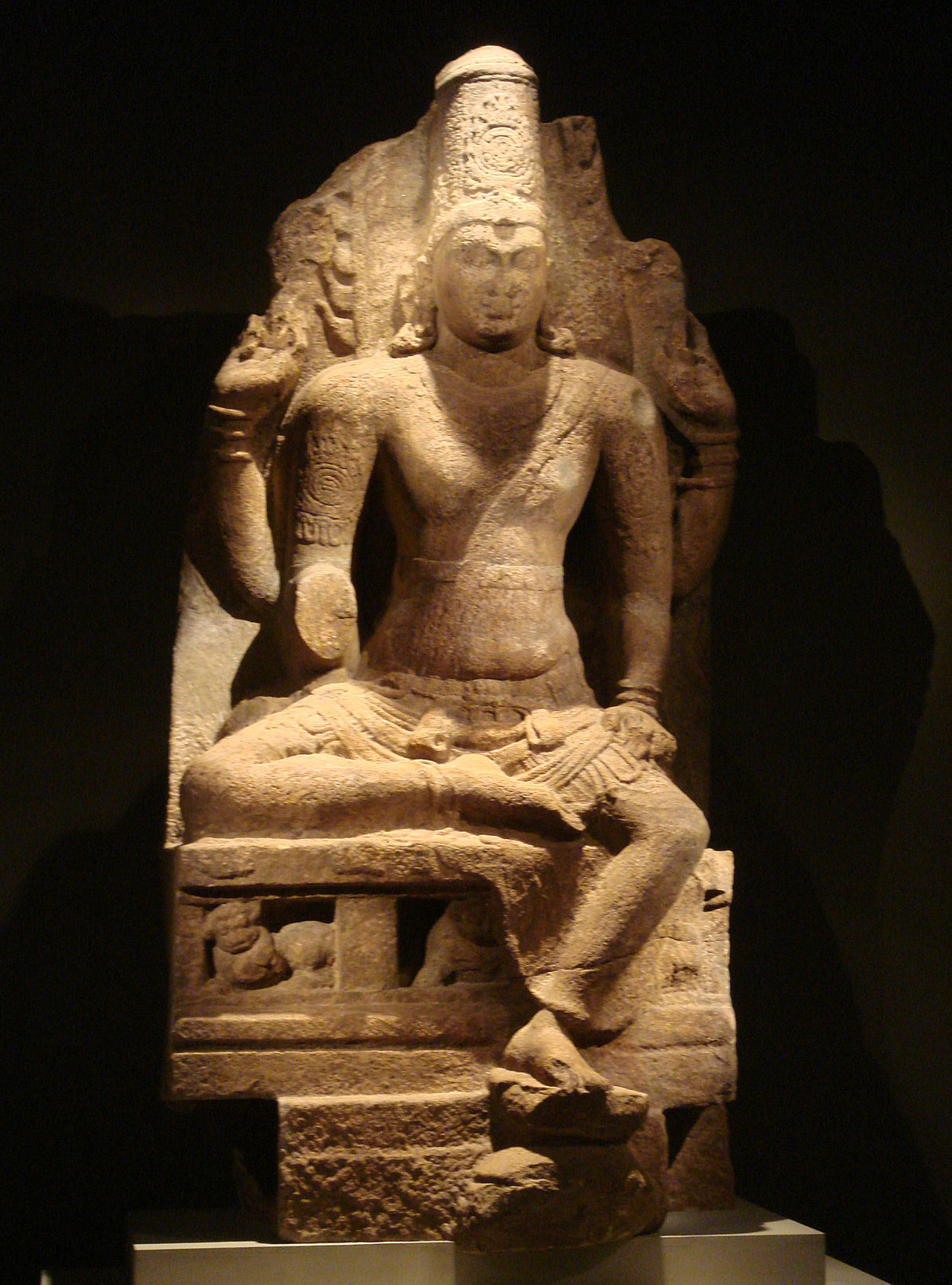
Enthroned god Vishnu, Pandya dynasty, second half of the 8th–early 9th century CE (Metropolitan Museum of Art, New York City)

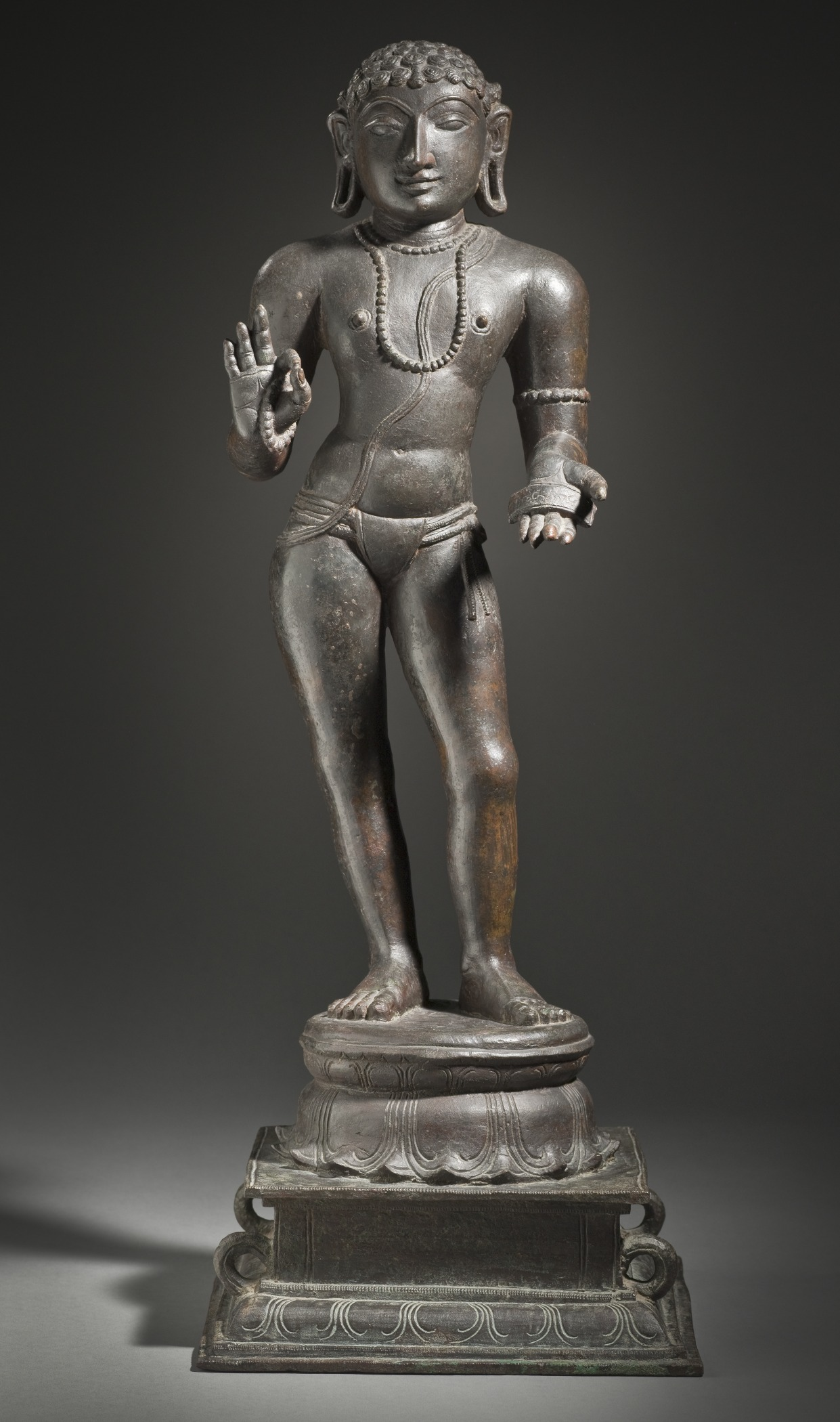
Manikkavachakar, Shaiva poet-saint and minister of Pandya king Varaguna II (dated to early 12th century) Los Angeles County Museum of Art

The Pandya kingdom was revived by king Kadungon c. 560–590 CE towards the end of the 6th-century CE. In the Velvikudi inscription, a later copper-plate, Kadungon appears as the "destroyer" of the "anti-Brahmanical" Kalabhra kings. Simhavishnu—the Pallava king and Pandya Kadungon had united the Tamil regions, removed Kalabhras and others. Simhavishnu consolidated his kingdom from south of the Krishna river and up to the Kaveri river by c. 575 CE. To the south of Kaveri, the Pandyas came to power. Cholas became subordinates of Pallavas and they were already ruling Telugu region of Rayalaseema. The Kalabhra rule which had dominated the political scene of the Tamil country for few centuries was defeated and ended by the Chalukyas, Pandyas, and Pallavas. This is attested by the numerous inscriptions dated from the 6th century and thereafter, as well as the Chinese language memoirs of the Buddhist pilgrim Xuanzang who visited the Tamil region about 640 CE along with other parts of the Indian subcontinent. Xuanzang describes a peaceful cosmopolitan region where some 100 monasteries with 10,000 monks were studying Mahayana Buddhism, Kanchipuram was hosting learned debates with hundreds of heretic Deva (Hindu) temples but no Buddhist institutions. Xuangzang makes no mention of the Kalabhras. Historian Noboru Karashima states that Kadunkon was a contemporary of Pallava Simhavishnu, who drove out the Kalabhras in the Tamil region and dated Kadunkon's reign to 560–590 CE. With the decline of the Kalabhra dynasty, the Pandyas grew steadily in power and territory. With the Cholas in obscurity in Uraiyur, the Tamil country was divided between the Pallavas of Kanchi and the Pandyas of Madurai.

From the 6th century to the 9th century CE, the Chalukyas of Badami, the Pallavas of Kanchi, and the Pandyas of Madurai dominated the politics of south India. The Badami Chalukyas were eventually replaced by the Rashtrakutas in the Deccan. The Pandyas took on the growing Pallava ambitions in south India, and from time to time they also joined in alliances with the kingdoms of the Deccan Plateau (such as with the Gangas of Talakad in late 8th century CE). In the middle of the 9th century, the Pandyas had managed to advance as far as Kumbakonam (north-east of Tanjore on the Kollidam river).

Kandunkon was succeeded by his son Maravarman Avanisulamani. His son, Sendan, c. 620–650 CE the third king of the Pandyas of Madurai, is known for expanding his kingdom to the Chera country (western Tamil Nadu and central Kerala). Arikesari Maravarman, c. 640–670 CE the fourth Pandya ruler, is known for his battles against the Pallavas of Kanchi. Pallava king Narasimhavarman I (r. 630–668 CE), the famous conqueror of Badami, claimed to have defeated the Pandyas. Chalukya King Paramesvaravarman I "Vikramaditya" (r. 670–700 CE) is known to have fought battles with the Pallavas, the Gangas, and probably with the Pandyas too, on the Kaveri basin.

Kirtivarman II (r. 744/5–55 CE), the last Chalukya king, managed to lose to his southern countries as a result of his battles with the Pandyas. Pandya kings Maravarman Rajasimha I (r. 710–65 CE) and Nedunjadaiyan/Varagunavarman I (r. 765–815 CE) threatened Pallava king Nandivarman II Pallavamalla (r. 731–96 CE) who had managed to defeat the Gangas in c. 760 CE. Varagunavarman I invaded the Pallava country and conquered the Kongu country (western Tamil Nadu) and Venadu (south Kerala). King Srimara Srivallabha (r. 815–62 CE) sailed to Sri Lanka, subjugated and overpowered King Sena I, and sacked his capital Anuradhapura (the Pandya invasion of Sri Lanka followed a period of vassalage). However, Srimara Srivallabha was soon overpowered by Pallava king Nripatunga (r. 859–99 CE). Sena II, the king of Sri Lanka, invaded the Pandya country, sacked Madurai and chose Varagunavarman II (r. c. 862–880 CE) as the new king soon after. It is proposed that the start of the Kollam Era, the Kerala calendar, in 825 CE marked the liberation of Venadu from Pandya control.

During the rule of Dantivarman (r. 796–847 CE), the Pallava territory was reduced by the encroachment from the Pandyas from the south (and Rashtrakutas and the Telugu-Cholas from north). Pallava king Nandivarman III (r. 846–69 CE) was able to defeat the Pandyas and Telugu-Cholas (and even the Rashtrakutas) with the help of the Gangas and the emerging Cholas.

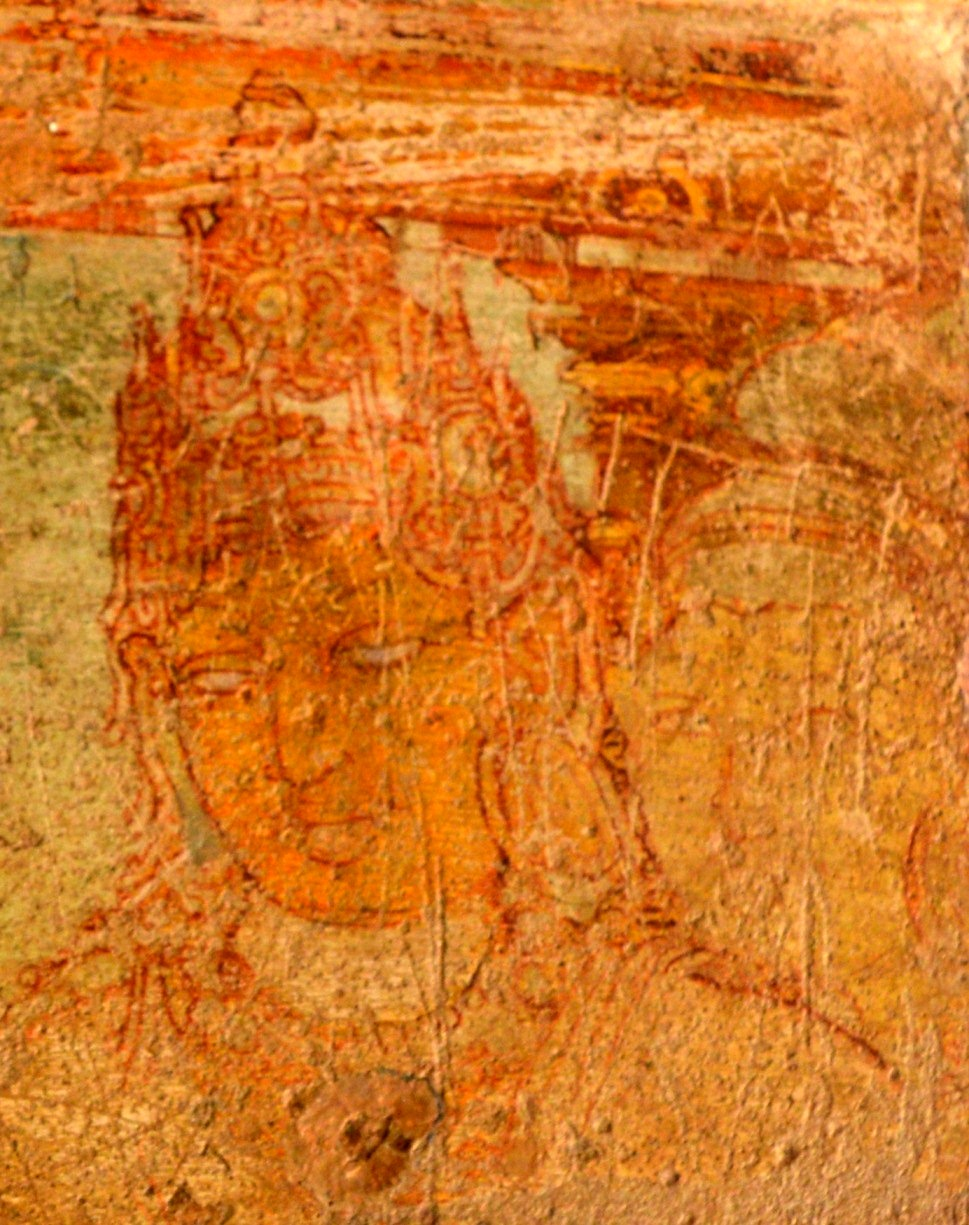
Portrait of King Srimara Srivallabha, 9th century.

Pandya kings (6th–10th century CE)
Pandya ruler	Reign	Ref.
Kadungon	c. 560–590 CE	
Maravarman Avanisulamani	c. 590–620 CE	
Seliyan Sendan (Jayantavarman)	c. 620–650 CE	
Arikesari Maravarman (Parankusan)	c. 640–670 CE	
Ko Chadaiyan Ranadhira	c. 670–710 CE	
Maravarman Rajasimha I	c. 710–765 CE	
Varagunavarman l (Jatila Parantaka Nedunchadaiyan)	c. 765–815 CE	
Maravarman Srimara Srivallabha	c. 815–862 CE	
Varaguna-varman II	c. 862–880 CE	
Parantaka Viranarayana Sadaiyan	c. 880–900/905 CE	
Maravarman Rajasimha II	c. 900–920 CE	

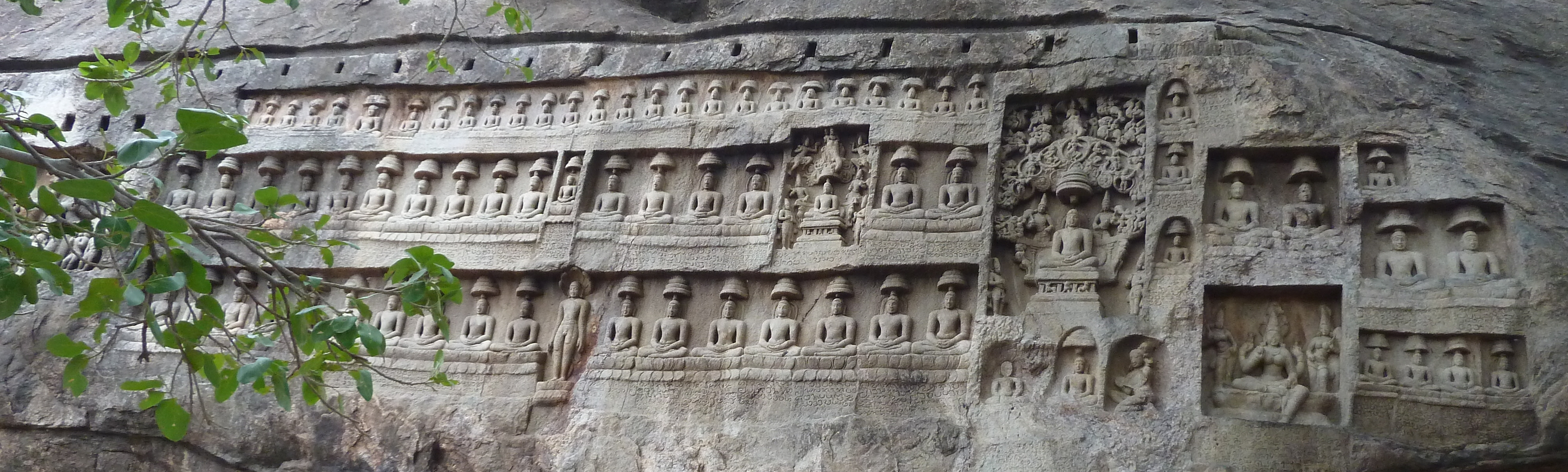
Kalugumalai Jain beds, Pandya kingdom, king Jatila Parantaka Nedunjadaiyan (8th century CE)

==== Under Chola influence (10th–13th centuries) ====
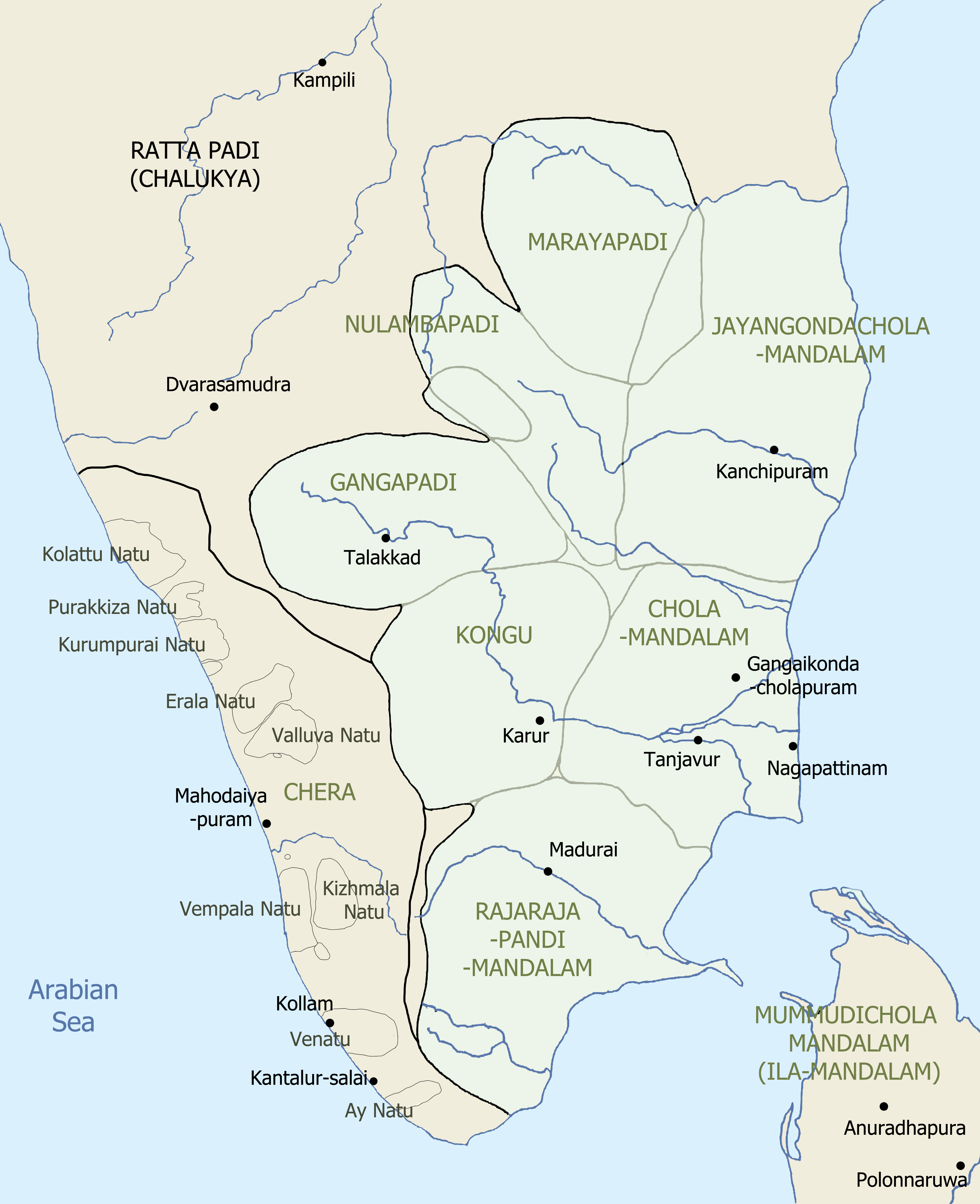
Pandya country in the Chola Empire (12th century)

While the Pandyas and the Rashtrakutas were busy engaging the Pallavas, with the Gangas and the Simhalas (Sri Lanka) also in the mix, the Cholas emerged from the Kaveri delta and took on the chieftains of Thanjavur (the Mutharaiyar chieftain had transferred their loyalty from the Pallava to the Pandya). The Chola king Vijayalaya conquered Thanjavur by defeating the Mutharaiyar chieftain around c. 850 CE. The Pandya control north of the Kaveri river was severely weakened by this move (and straightened the position of the Pallava ruler Nripatunga). Pandya ruler Varaguna-varman II (r. c. 862–880 CE) responded by marching into the Chola country and facing a formidable alliance of Pallava prince Aparajita, the Chola king Aditya I and the Ganga king Prithvipati I. The Pandya king suffered a crushing defeat (c. 880 CE) in a battle fought near Kumbakonam.

By c. 897 CE, Chola king Aditya I was the master of the old Pallava, Ganga and Kongu countries. It is a possibility that Aditya I conquered the Kongu country from the Pandya king Parantaka Viranarayana (r. 880–900 CE). Parantaka I, successor to Aditya, invaded the Pandya territories in 910 CE and captured Madurai from king Maravarman Rajasimha II (hence the title "Madurai Konda"). Rajasimha II received help from the Sri Lankan king Kassapa V, still got defeated by Parantaka I in the battle of Vellur, and fled to Sri Lanka. Rajasimha then found refuge in the Chera country, leaving even his royal insignia in Sri Lanka, the home of his mother.

The Cholas were defeated by a Rashtrakuta-lead confederacy in the battle of Takkolam in 949 CE. By mid-950s, the Chola kingdom had shrunk to the size of a small principality (its vassals in the extreme south had proclaimed their independence). It is a possibility that Pandya ruler Vira Pandya defeated Chola king Gandaraditya and claimed independence. Chola ruler Sundara Parantaka II (r. 957–73) responded by defeating Vira Pandya I in two battles (and Chola prince Aditya II killed Vira Pandya on the second occasion). The Pandyas were assisted by the Sri Lanka forces of King Mahinda IV.

Chola emperor Rajaraja I (r. 985–1014 CE) is known to have attacked the Pandyas. He fought against an alliance of the Pandya, Chera and Sri Lankan kings, and defeated the Cheras and "deprived" the Pandyas of their ancient capital Madurai. Emperor Rajendra I continued to occupy the Pandya kingdom, and even appointed a series of Chola viceroys with the title "Chola Pandya" to rule from Madurai (over Pandya and Western Chera/Kerala countries). The very beginning of Chola emperor Kulottunga's rule (r. from 1070 CE) was marked by the loss of Sri Lanka and a rebellion in the Pandya country.

The second half of the 12th century witnessed a major internal crisis in the Pandya country (between princes Parakrama Pandya and Kulasekhara Pandya). The neighbouring kingdoms of Sri Lanka, under Parakramabahu I, Venadu Chera/Kerala, under the Kulasekharas, and the Cholas, under Rajadhiraja II and Kulottunga III, joined in and took sides with any of the two princes or their kins.

Pandya kings (10th century – first half of 11th century CE):

- Sundara Pandya I
- Vira Pandya I (Veerapandyan)
- Vira Pandya II
- Amarabhujanga Tivrakopa
- Srivallabha Manakulachala (1101–1124 CE)
- Maravarman Srivallabha (1132–1161 CE)
- Parakrama I (1161–1162 CE)
- Kulasekara III
- Vira Pandya III
- Jatavarman Srivallabha (1175–1180 CE)
- Jatavarman Kulasekara I (1190–1216 CE)

=== Imperial Pandyas (13th–14th centuries) ===
The Pandya empire included extensive territories, at times including large portions of south India and Sri Lanka. The rule of the empire was shared among several royals, one of them enjoying primacy over the rest. The Pandya king at Madurai thus controlled these vast regions through the collateral family branches subject to Madurai.

You must know that in this province there are five kings, who are own brothers. [...] At this end of [Ma'abar] reigns one of those five Royal brothers, who is a crowned king, and his name is [Sundara Pandi Devar]. In his kingdom they find very fine and great pearls ...

— Marco Polo, translated by Sir Henry Yule, The Travels of Marco Polo - Volume 2, chapter XVI

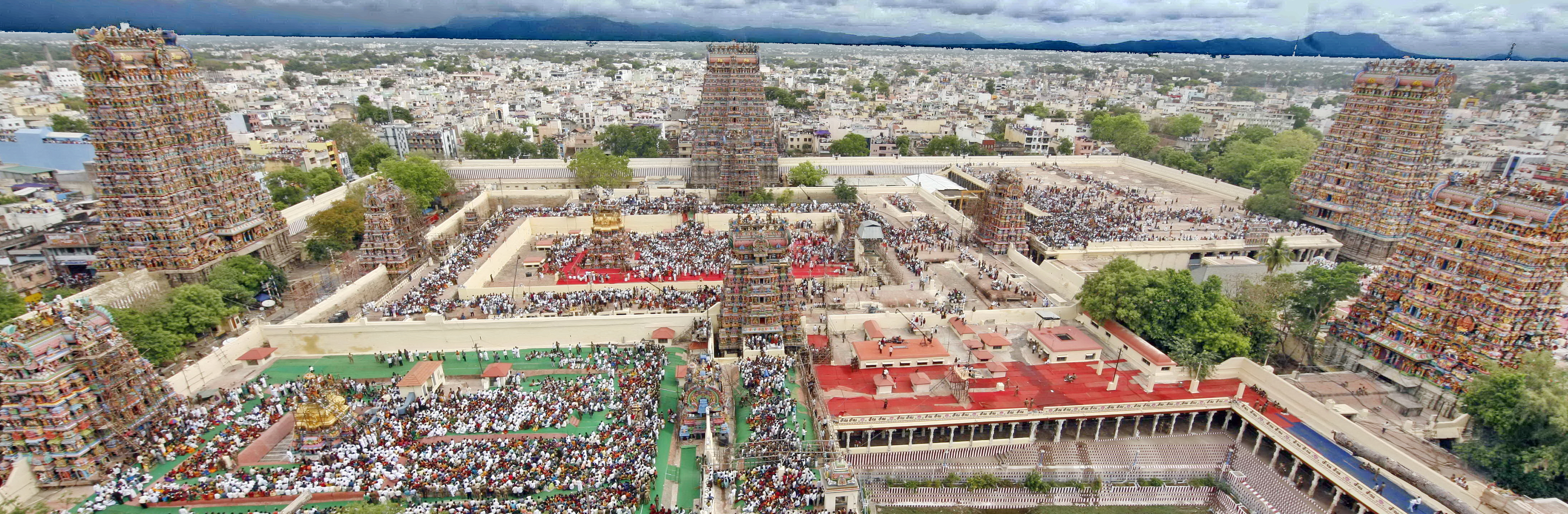
An aerial view of Madurai city from Meenakshi Temple

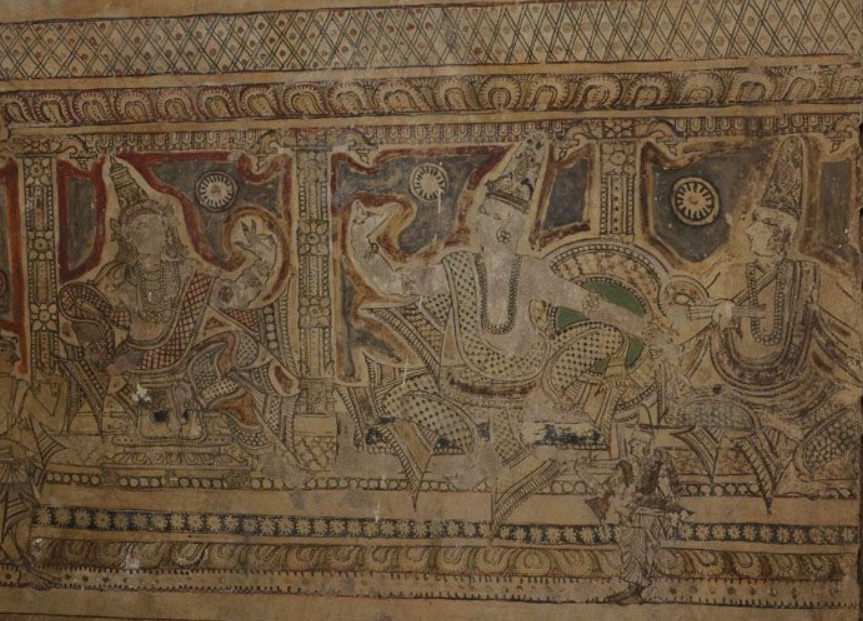
Coronation of Pandya King Srivallabha, attended by King Achyuta Deva Raya (center) of Vijayanagara Empire. Tiruppudaimarudur murals, 1600s.

Pandya kings (13th–14th centuries CE)
Pandya ruler	Reign
Maravarman Sundara I	1216–1238 CE
Sadayavarman Kulasekaran II	1238–1240 CE
Maravarman Sundara II	1238–1251 CE
Jatavarman Sundara I	1251–1268 CE
Maravarman Kulasekara I	1268–1310 CE
Sundara Pandya IV	1309–1327 CE
Vira Pandya IV	1309–1345 CE

==== Maravarman Sundara I ====
The foundation for the Pandya supremacy in south India was laid by Maravarman Sundara I early in the 13th century. He succeeded his older brother Jatavarman Kulasekhara in 1216. He invaded the Chola country, sacked Uraiyur and Thanjavur, and drove the Chola king Kulothunga III into exile. The Chola king subsequently made a formal submission to Maravarman Sundara I and acknowledged his overlordship. Attempts by the next Chola king Rajaraja III (1216–46 CE) for self-rule (to stop the Pandya invasion into the Chola country), with the help of the Hoysalas king Narasimha II (r. 1220 – 1238 CE), resulted in a battle between the Pandya and Hoysala forces at Mahendramangalam on the Kaveri Valley. Maravarman Sundara I was defeated and Rajaraja III was restored in the Chola country. Sometime later Chola prince Rajendra III attacked the Pandyas and defeated two Pandya royals including Maravarman Sundara II. Hoysala king Somesvara (r. 1233 – 1267 CE) then came to the aid of the Pandyas, defeated Rajendra III and then made peace with the Cholas.

==== Jatavarman Sundara I ====
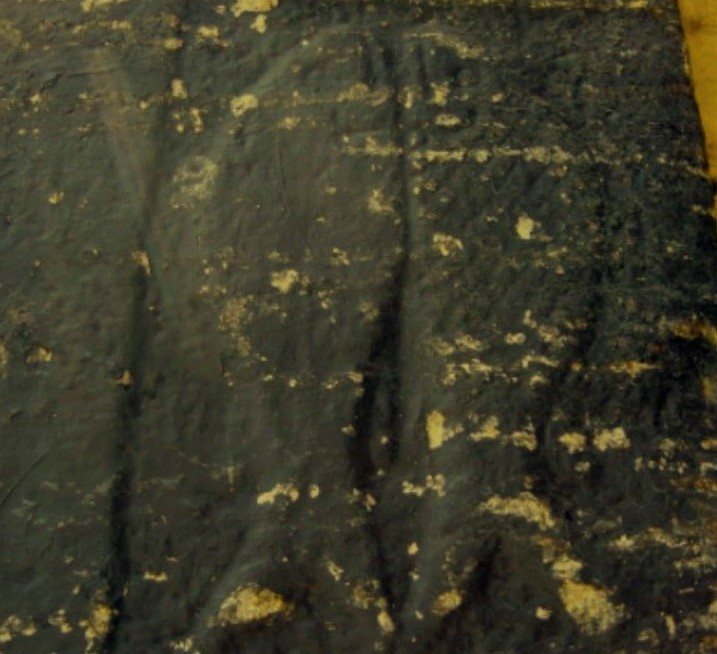
Jatavarman Vira II's fish insignia at Koneswaram temple in Trincomalee (Eastern Province)

Jatavarman Sundara I ascended the Pandya throne in 1251 CE. He led his army to the Chola country (even as far as Nellore), to Sri Lanka and to south Kerala. He was also successful in confining the Hoysala control to the Mysore Plateau (the ancient Chola country was now overrun by the Pandyas). Kanchi functioned as the second major city in the kingdom. In his conquests, Jatavarman Sundara I assisted joined number of Pandya royals such as Jatavarman Vira Pandya.

Jatavarman Sundara I subdued Rajendra II around 1258–1260 CE and made him pay tribute. The rule of the Cholas ended c. 1279 with Rajendra III. The Pandya attacked the Hoysalas in the Kaveri and captured the fort of Kannanur Koppam. Hoysala king Somesvara was forced to fall back into the Mysore Plateau. The Hoysala king, pressed by enemies from north and south, "assigned" the southern half of his kingdom to his younger son Ramanatha (r. 1254–1292). Somesvara was eventually killed by the Pandya in 1262 CE. Ramanatha managed to recover Kannanur and hold against the Pandya power. Jatavarman Sundara I also came into conflict with the Kadava ruler Kopperunjinga II. It seems that Bana (Magadai) and Kongu countries came under the Pandya rule during the wars against the Hoysalas and the Kadavas. Jatavarman Sundara I also fought the Kakatiya ruler Ganapati (1199–1262). Sri Lanka was invaded by Jatavarman Sundara I in 1258 and on his behalf by his younger brother Jatavarman Vira II between 1262 and 1264 CE. The island was again invaded and defeated by Jatavarman Vira II in 1270 CE.

==== Maravarman Kulasekara I ====
Sundara Pandya I (died in 1268) was succeeded by Maravarman Kulasekara I. Around 1279 the combined force of Hoysala king Ramanatha and Rajendra III was defeated by Maravarman Kulasekara I. Maravarman Kulasekara I, now virtually unchallenged, ruled over the Chola country and southern Tamil speaking portions of Hoysala kingdom. He also invaded Sri Lanka, ruled by Bhuvanaikabahu I, who "carried away to the Pandya country the venerable Tooth Relic", and the wealth of the island. Sri Lanka remained under Pandya control until c. 1308–1309 CE.

==== Decline of Pandyas ====
After the death of Maravarman Kulasekhara I (1310), his sons Vira Pandya IV and Sundara Pandya IV fought a war of succession for control of the empire. It seems that Maravarman Kulasekhara wanted Vira Pandya to succeed him (who in turn was defeated by Sundara Pandya after a short period). Unfortunately, the Pandya civil war coincided with the Khalji raids in south India. Taking advantage of the political situation, the neighbouring Hoysala king Ballala III invaded the Pandya territory. However, Ballala had to retreat to his capital, when Alauddin Khalji's general Malik Kafur invaded his kingdom at the same time. After subjugating Ballala III, the Khalji forces marched to the Pandya territory in March 1311. The Pandya brothers fled their headquarters, and the Khaljis pursued them unsuccessfully. By late April 1311, the Khaljis gave up their plans to pursue the Pandya princes, and returned to Delhi with the plunder. By 1312 the Pandya control over south Kerala was also lost.

After the departure of the Khaljis, Vira and Sundara Pandya resumed their conflict. Sundara Pandya was defeated and sought help from the Khaljis. With their help, he regained control of the South Arcot region by 1314. Subsequently, there were two more expeditions from the sultanate in 1314 led by Khusro Khan and in 1323 by Jauna Khan under the Punjab-born sultan Ghiyath al-Din Tughluq.

The family quarrels and the sultanate invasions shattered the Pandya empire beyond revival and coinage discoveries made imply that the Pandyas were left with the old South Arcot region. In 1323, the Jaffna kingdom declared its independence from the crumbling Pandya influence.

=== Tenkasi Pandyas (14th–16th centuries) ===
The Pandya kings from Sadaavarman Parakrama Pandya to his successors who ruled with Tenkasi as their capital. With the invasion of the Sultanates, Vijayanagaras, and Nayakars from the fourteenth century onwards, the Pandyas lost their traditional capital of Madurai and shifted to cities like Tenkasi and Tirunelveli. Tenkasi was the last capital of the Pandyas. All the Pandyas from Sadaavarman Parakrama Pandya and his next generations were crowned in the Adheenam Mutt in Kasi Viswanathar temple. During the same period, some Pandyas ruled with Tirunelveli as their capital. Kayatharu, Vadakkuvalliyur, and Ukkirankottai are some of their major cities. Inscriptions on them are found in Tenkasi's Kasi Viswanathar temple, Brahmadesam, Tirunelveli, Cheranmadevi, Ambasamudram, Kalakkad and Pudukkottai. The last Pandyan king known was Kollankonda, who was of the Tenkasi Pandya line.

Although the Vijayanagara Empire and the Nayaks ruled Madurai after the 14th century, they were occasionally opposed by the Pandyas. Sometimes, these Pandyas ruled Madurai. Prominent among them were Sadaavarman Vikrama Pandya (1401–1422 AD) and his son, Arikesari Parakrama Pandya. They had built 32 forts around Madurai. Later, when Vishwanatha Nayakkar became the Madurai Mandalasuvaran (Governor of Madurai), he feared a Pandya resurgence in Madurai. To prevent this, he divided Madurai into 72 districts (palayams, each with a separate chief—a Polygar) including 16 districts of those closest to the Pandyas. He assigned separate battalions to these Polygars, allowing them to repel the Pandyas. This secured Madurai from the Pandyas forever, allowing the Nayaks to gain supremacy.

King	Period
Sadaavarman Parakrama Pandya	1422–1463 AD
Kulasekara Pandiyan III	1429–1473 AD
Aksharan Perumal Parakrama Pandya	1473–1506 AD
Kulasekara Pandya	1479–1499 AD
Sadaverman Sewallapa Pandya	1534–1543 AD
Parakrama Kulasekaran	1543–1552 AD
Nelveli Maran	1552–1564 AD
Sadaavarman Adeevirama Pandya	1564–1604 AD
Varathuranga Pandya	1588–1612 AD
Varagunarama Pandya	1613–1618 AD
Kollankondan	(N.A.)

==== Legacy ====
While the previous sultanate raids were content with plunder, the Tughluqs under Ulugh Khan (later Muhammad bin Tughluq) annexed the former Pandya dominions to the sultanate as the province of Ma'bar. Most of south India came under the sultanate rule and was divided into five provinces—Devagiri, Tiling, Kampili, Dorasamudra and Ma'bar. Jalal ud-Din Hasan Khan was appointed governor of the newly created southernmost Ma'bar province. In c. 1334, Jalal ud-Din Hasan Khan declared his independence and created Madurai sultanate. The Pandyas shifted their capital to Tenkasi and continued to rule a small area until the end of the 16th century as Tenkasi Pandyas.

Bukka Raya I of Vijayanagara empire conquered the city of Madurai in c. 1370, imprisoned the sultan, released and restored Arcot's prince Sambuva Raya to the throne. Bukka Raya I appointed his son Veera Kumara Kampana as the viceroy of the Tamil region. Meanwhile, the Madurai sultanate was replaced by the Nayak governors of Vijayanagara in 1378. In 1529 the Nayak governors declared independence and established Madurai Nayak dynasty.

== Economy ==
=== Early history ===
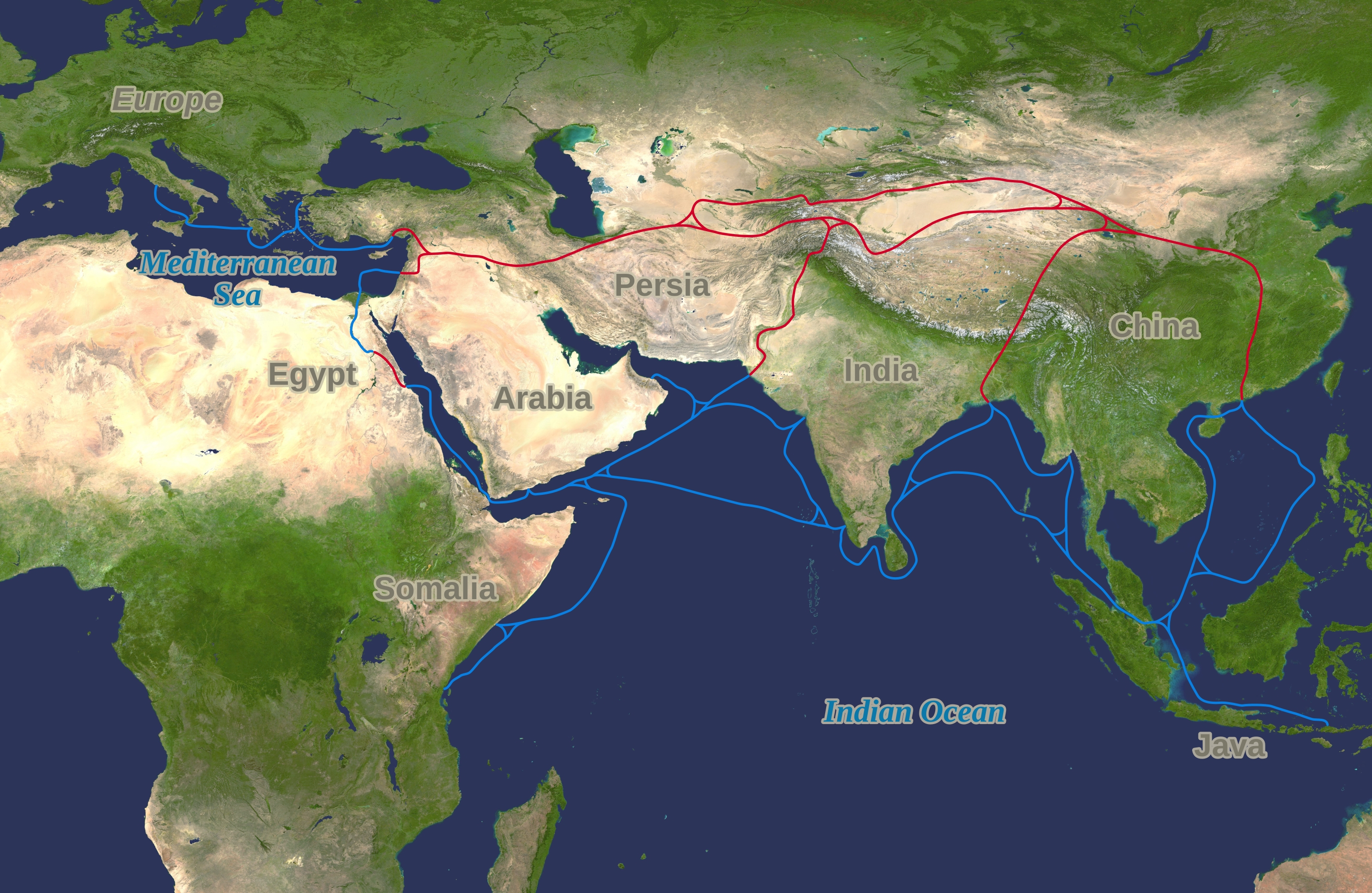
Ancient Silk Road trade routes

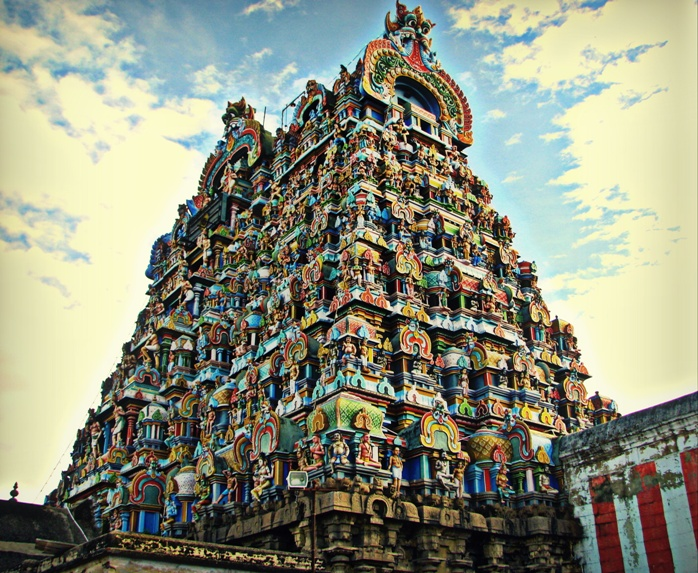
The gopura of Nellaiappar Temple

The Pandya country, located at the extreme southwestern tip of South Asia, served as an important meeting point throughout the history of India. The location was economically and geopolitically significant as a key point connecting the shipping between Southeast Asia and the Middle East. Graeco-Roman merchants frequented the ancient Tamil country, present day south India and Sri Lanka, securing contacts with the Tamil chiefdoms of the Pandya, Chola and Chera families. The western sailors also established several trading settlements on the harbours of the ancient Tamil region. The trade with South Asia by the Greco-Roman world flourished since the time of the Ptolemaic dynasty a few decades before the start of the Common Era and remained long after the fall of the Western Roman Empire. The contacts between south India and the Middle East continued even after the Byzantium's loss of the ports of Egypt and the Red Sea in the 7th century CE.

The early historic Pandya country was famous for its supply of pearls. The ancient port of Korkai, in present-day Thoothukudi, was the centre of the pearl trade. Written records from Graeco-Roman and Egyptian voyagers give details about the pearl fisheries off the Gulf of Mannar. Greek historian Megasthenes reported about the pearl fisheries, indicating that the Pandyas derived great wealth from the pearl trade. Convicts were according to the Periplus of the Erythraean Sea used as pearl divers in Korkai. The Periplus even mentions that "pearls inferior to the Indian sort are exported in great quantity from the marts of Apologas and Omana". The pearls from the Pandya country were also in demand in the kingdoms of north India. Literary references of the pearl fishing mention how the fishermen, who dive into the sea, avoid attacks from sharks, bring up the right-whorled chank and blow on the sounding shell.

=== Pandya coinage ===
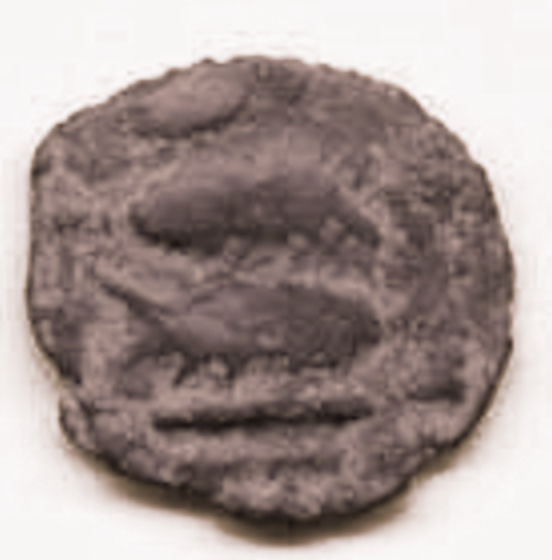
One of the early coins of the Pandyas showing their emblem of the Two Fishes

The early coins of Tamilakam bore the symbols of the Three Crowned Kings, the tiger, the fish and the bow, representing the symbols of the Cholas, Pandyas and Cheras. Coins of Pandyas bear the legend of different Pandya ruler in different times. The Pandyas had issued silver punch-marked and die-struck copper coins in the early period. A few gold coins were attributed to the Pandya rulers of this period. These coins bore the image of fish, singly or in pairs, which were their emblem.

Some of the coins had the names Sundara, Sundara Pandya or merely the letter 'Su' were etched. Some of the coins bore a boar with the legend of 'Vira-Pandya. It had been said that those coins were issued by the Pandyas and the feudatories of the Cholas but could not be attributed to any particular king. The coins of Pandyas were square. Those coins were etched with an elephant on one side and the other side remained blank. The inscription on the silver and gold coins during the Pandyas were in Tamil-Brahmi and the copper coins bore the Tamil legends. The coins of the Pandyas, which bore the fish symbols, were termed as 'Kodandaraman' and 'Kanchi' Valangum Perumal'. Apart from these, 'Ellamthalaiyanam' was seen on coins which had the standing king on one side and the fish on the other. 'Samarakolahalam' and 'Bhuvanekaviram' were found on the coins having a Garuda, 'Konerirayan' on coins having a bull and 'Kaliyugaraman' on coins that depict a pair of feet.

== Religion ==
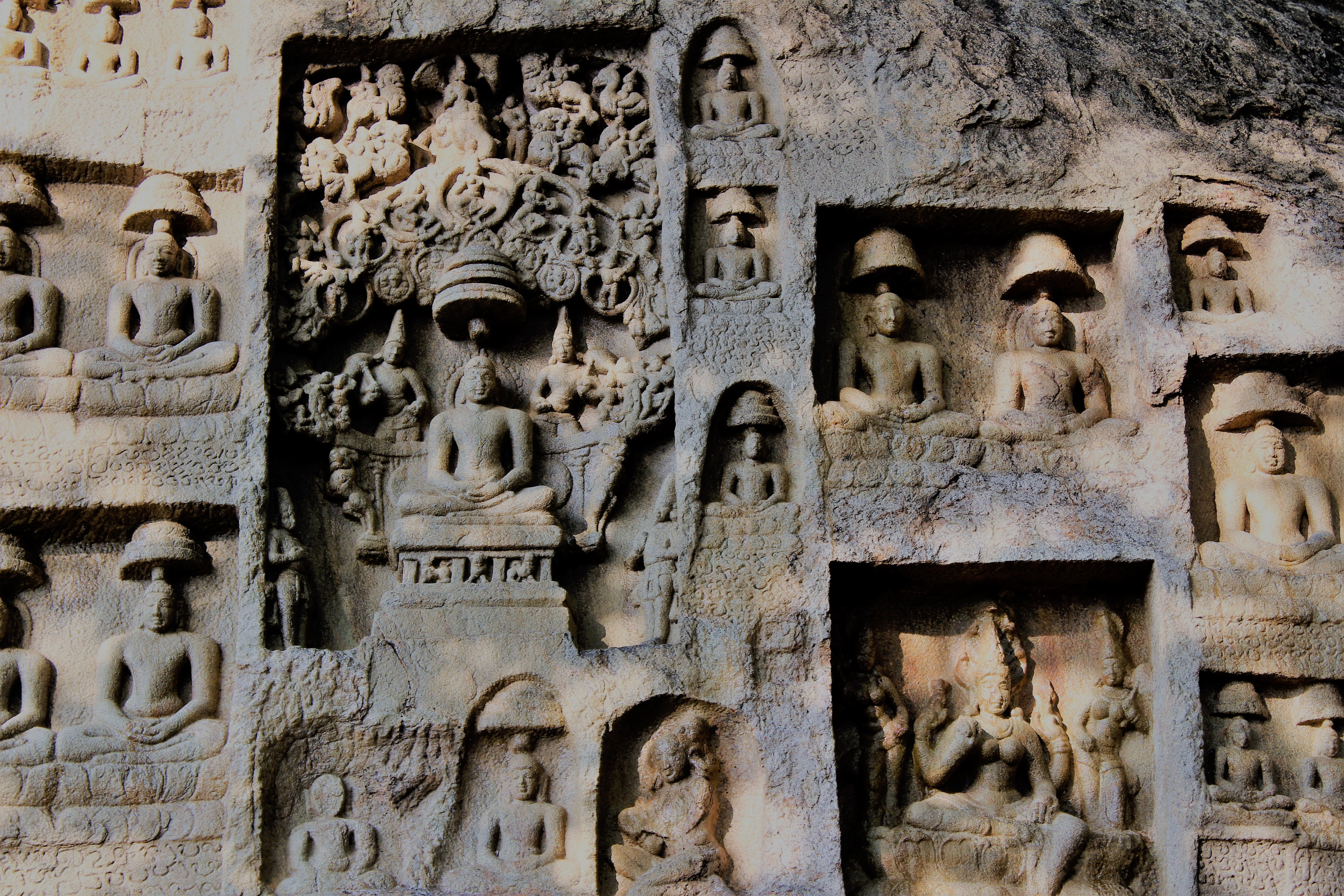
Kazhugumalai Jain beds

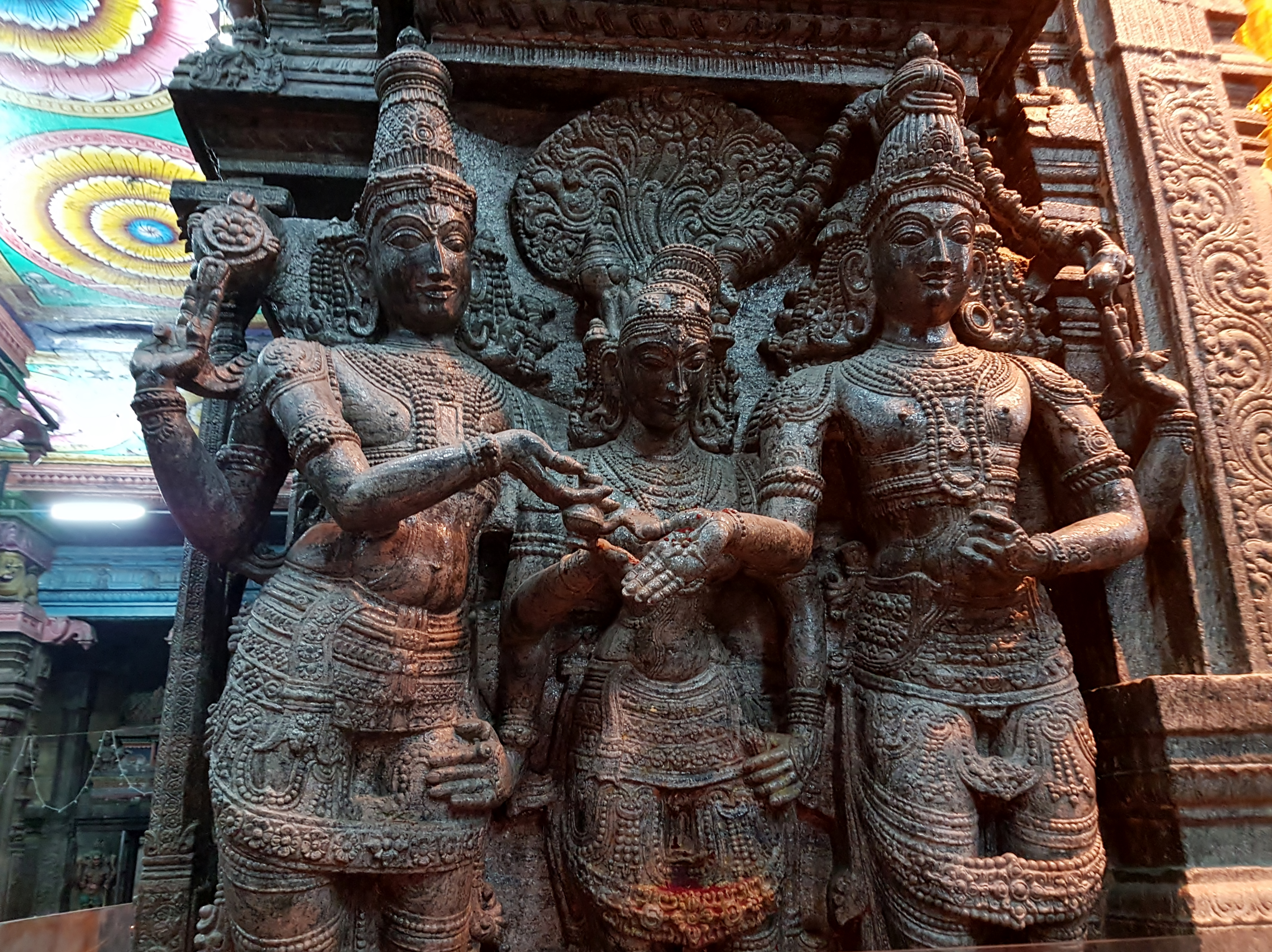
Depiction of Vishnu, Meenakshi, and Shiva (Meenakshi Temple, Madurai)

Early Pandya rulers are traditionally associated with patronage of Jainism and Shaivism. In literary and inscriptional records, several Pandya kings are described as having supported Jain monks and institutions. According to tradition, a Pandya ruler known as Koon Pandya was later converted to Shaivism. Based on such accounts, historians believe that the early Pandyas were originally adherents of Jainism and only later converted to Shaivism and lending royal support to the Bhakti movement.

The Pandya period (c. 13th century CE) was characterised by several elite forms of Hinduism, a popular bhakti religion and an even more widespread local form of Hinduism. The distinctions between the three were not differentiated. The worship of the gods Vishnu and Shiva was generally supported by the elite and Shiva was generally later supported by the elite. The bhakti movement emphasized the mutual intense emotional attachment between the god and the devotee.

The Pandya country was home to several renowned temples including the Meenakshi Temple in Madurai. As some of the largest employers and landowners of the Pandya country, the temples played an important part in the Tamil economy and society. They generally also served as banks, schools, dispensaries, and poorhouses (thus performing valuable social functions). The large walled temple complexes of the Pandya country also contained several administrative offices and bazaars.

== Architecture ==
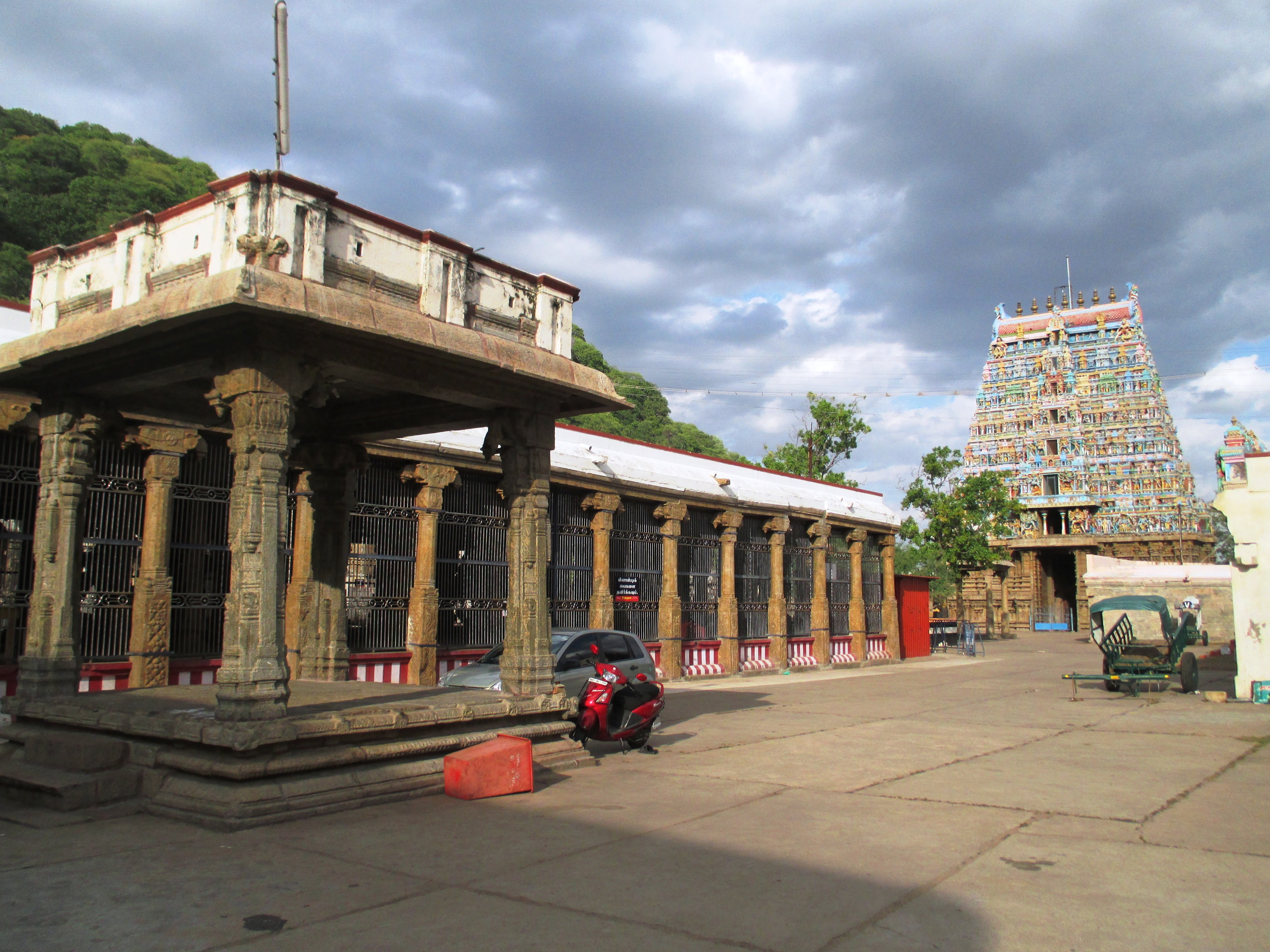
Alagar Koyil, Tamil Nadu

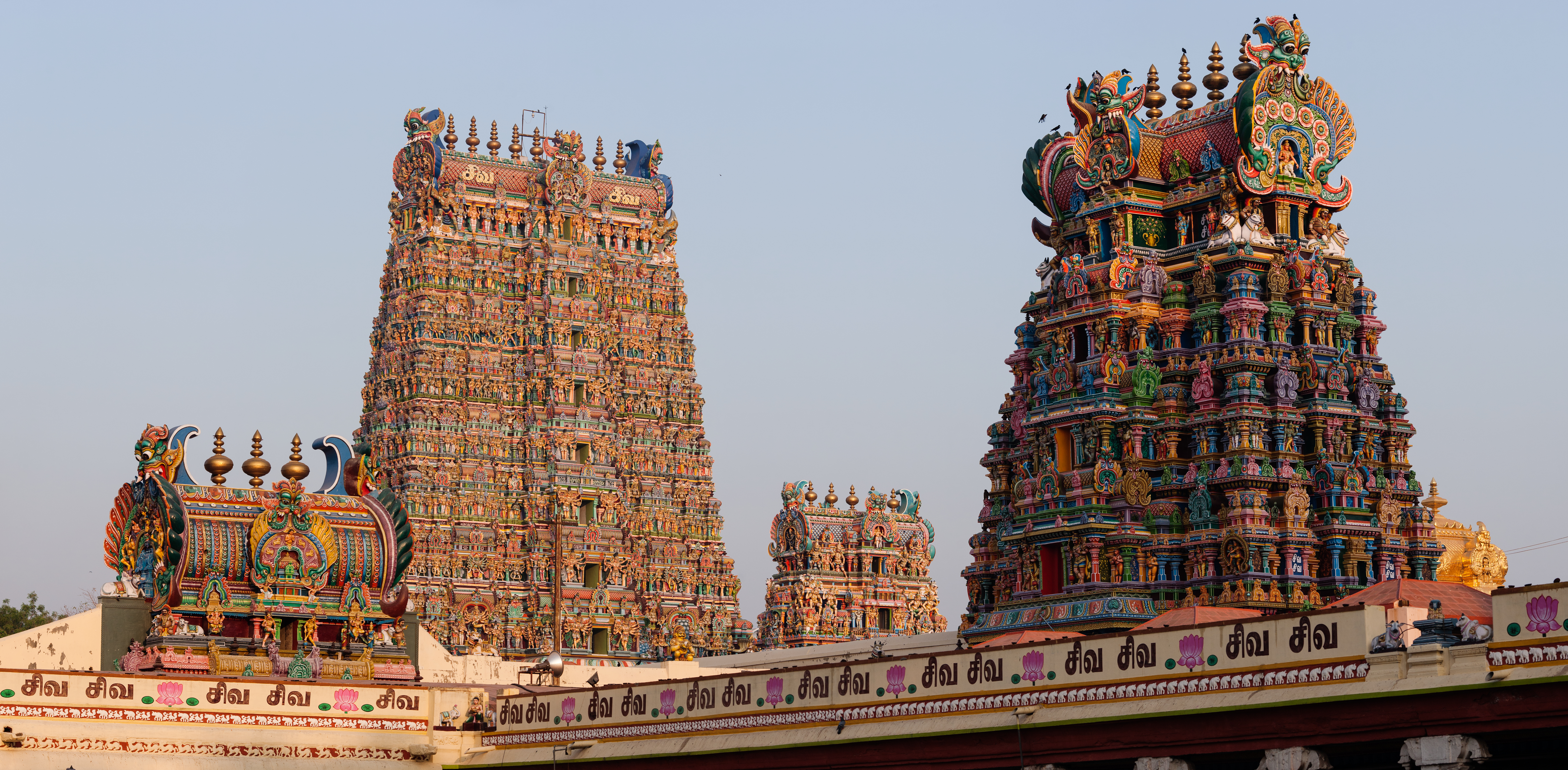
Meenakshi Temple, Madurai

The early temple architecture phase in Tamil Nadu opens with the rock-cut cave temples.

The Tamil country is home to the 'South Indian' or 'Dravidian' style of medieval temple architecture.

- Typical temple consists of a hall and a square sanctum (the gabhagrha)
- The foundation block, or socle, is known as the adhisthana.
- Walls of the sanctum are generally divided by pilasters.
- Superstructure: 'kutina' type (stepped stories in pyramidal form with decorative bands/parapets or the hdras)
- The parapet is composed of miniature shrines (called the kutas and salas) connected by wall elements (the harantaras).
- On top, a necking that supports a solid dome, or cupola (crowned by a pot and finial)—the sikhara.
- Gopura: the great entrance buildings

The major Pandya contributions to Dravidian architecture come after the Pallava (7th–9th centuries) and the Chola periods (9th–12th centuries).

- Gopuras are extremely large and elaborately decorated (capped by a barrel vault).
- Successively built walls and gopuras.

Finest Pandyan architectures:

- Jambukeswarar Temple, Tiruchirapalli
- Kallalagar temple, Alagar Koyil
- Meenakshi Temple, Madurai
- Nataraja Temple, Chidambaram

== In popular culture ==
The Pandyas are a secondary subject of the Tamil films Aayirathil Oruvan (2010), Ponniyin Selvan: I (2022), Ponniyin Selvan: II (2023), and Yaathisai (2023).

== See also ==
- Tamilakam
- Economy of ancient Tamil country
- History of Kerala
- History of Tamil Nadu
- Indian maritime history
- Indo-Roman relations
- Indo-Roman trade relations
- Industry in ancient Tamil country
- Karungalakudi
- List of Tamil monarchs
- Pandyan Civil War (1169–1177)
- Tammuzh

Timeline and cultural period	Indus plain (Punjab-Sapta Sindhu-Gujarat)	Gangetic Plain			Central India	Southern India
Timeline and cultural period	Indus plain (Punjab-Sapta Sindhu-Gujarat)	Upper Gangetic Plain (Ganga-Yamuna doab)	Middle Gangetic Plain	Lower Gangetic Plain	Central India	Southern India
IRON AGE
Culture	Late Vedic Period	Late Vedic Period; Painted Grey Ware culture	Late Vedic Period; Northern Black Polished Ware		Pre-history	
6th century BCE	Gandhara	Kuru-Panchala	Magadha		Adivasi (tribes)	Assaka
Culture	Persian-Greek influences	"Second Urbanisation"; Rise of Shramana movements Jainism - Buddhism - Ājīvika - Yoga			Pre-history	
5th century BCE	(Persian conquests)		Shaishunaga dynasty		Adivasi (tribes)	Assaka
4th century BCE	(Greek conquests)	Nanda empire				
HISTORICAL AGE
Culture	Spread of Buddhism				Pre-history	
3rd century BCE	Maurya Empire					Satavahana dynasty Sangam period (300 BCE – 200 CE); Early Cholas; Early Pandyan kingdom Cheras
Culture	Preclassical Hinduism (Note: Michaels (2004) p.39) - "Hindu Synthesis" (Note: Hiltebeitel (2002)) (ca. 200 BCE - 300 CE) (Note: Michaels (2004) p.39) (Note: Hiltebeitel (2002)); Epics - Puranas - Ramayana - Mahabharata - Bhagavad Gita - Brahma Sutras - Smarta Tradition; Mahayana Buddhism					
2nd century BCE	Indo-Greek Kingdom		Shunga Empire; Maha-Meghavahana Dynasty			Satavahana dynasty Sangam period (300 BCE – 200 CE); Early Cholas; Early Pandyan kingdom Cheras
1st century BCE	Indo-Greek Kingdom		Shunga Empire; Maha-Meghavahana Dynasty			Satavahana dynasty Sangam period (300 BCE – 200 CE); Early Cholas; Early Pandyan kingdom Cheras
1st century CE	Indo-Scythians; Indo-Parthians		Kuninda Kingdom			Satavahana dynasty Sangam period (300 BCE – 200 CE); Early Cholas; Early Pandyan kingdom Cheras
2nd century	Kushan Empire					Satavahana dynasty Sangam period (300 BCE – 200 CE); Early Cholas; Early Pandyan kingdom Cheras
3rd century	Kushano-Sasanian Kingdom; Western Satraps	Kushan Empire		Kamarupa kingdom	Adivasi (tribes)	Satavahana dynasty Sangam period (300 BCE – 200 CE); Early Cholas; Early Pandyan kingdom Cheras
Culture	"Golden Age of Hinduism"(ca. CE 320-650) (Note: Michaels (2004) p.40); Puranas - Kural; Co-existence of Hinduism and Buddhism					
4th century	Kidarites	Gupta Empire; Varman dynasty				Andhra Ikshvakus; Kalabhra dynasty Kadamba Dynasty; Western Ganga Dynasty
5th century	Hephthalite Empire	Alchon Huns				Vishnukundina; Kalabhra dynasty
6th century	Nezak Huns; Kabul Shahi; Maitraka				Adivasi (tribes)	Vishnukundina; Badami Chalukyas; Kalabhra dynasty
Culture	Late-Classical Hinduism (ca. CE 650-1100) (Note: Michaels (2004) p.41); Advaita Vedanta - Tantra; Decline of Buddhism in India					
7th century	Indo-Sassanids		Vakataka dynasty Empire of Harsha	Mlechchha dynasty	Adivasi (tribes)	Badami Chalukyas; Eastern Chalukyas; Pandyan kingdom (revival); Pallava
7th century	Karkota dynasty				Adivasi (tribes)	
8th century	Kabul Shahi	Pala Empire			Adivasi (tribes)	Eastern Chalukyas; Pandyan kingdom Kalachuri
9th century	Gurjara-Pratihara				Adivasi (tribes)	Rashtrakuta Empire; Eastern Chalukyas; Pandyan kingdom Medieval Cholas; Chera Perumals of Makkotai
10th century	Ghaznavids			Pala dynasty Kamboja-Pala dynasty	Adivasi (tribes)	Kalyani Chalukyas; Eastern Chalukyas; Medieval Cholas; Chera Perumals of Makkotai; Rashtrakuta
References and sources for table References Sources: Flood, Gavin D. (1996), An Introduction to Hinduism, Cambridge University Press; Hiltebeitel, Alf (2002), Hinduism. In: Joseph Kitagawa, "The Religious Traditions of Asia: Religion, History, and Culture", Routledge; Michaels, Axel (2004), Hinduism. Past and present, Princeton, New Jersey: Princeton University Press
