= Arippu Fort =

Portuguese-built fort in Sri Lanka

- Mannar, Sri Lanka

Site information
- Type: Defence fort
- Condition: Ruins

Location
- Location within Northern Province
- Coordinates: 8.792592°N 79.929653°E

Site history
- Built by: Portuguese
- Materials: Brick

Arippu Fort (Tamil: அரிப்புக் கோட்டை, romanized: Arippuk Kōṭṭai; Sinhala: අරිප්පු බලකොටුව, romanized: Arippu Balakotuwa; also known as Allirani fort; Tamil: அல்லிராணிக் கோட்டை, romanized: Allirāṇik Kōṭṭai) was built by the Portuguese and was handed over to the Dutch in 1658. The small bastion fort is located in Arippu, which is 16 km (9.9 mi) away from Mannar Island. The fort is nearly square in shape, with two bastions.

Robert Knox, English sea captain and famous British prisoner of the Kandyan King Rajasinghe II, and his companion escaped after nineteen years of captivity and reached the Arippu Fort in 1679.

The first British Governor of Ceylon, Frederick North, constructed his official summer residence at the beach front, now known as The Doric and converted the fort into accommodation for the officers, who operated the pearl fisheries in the area. The fort building was subsequently converted to a guest house but was abandoned when the civil war spread to the area.

A legend says the Tamil Queen Alli Raani ruled in Mannar region. It believes that her fortress was located where the ruins of fort can be seen today. Further, the legend says that Kudiramalai area was her palace, and Queen Alli ruled where Kuveni subsequently ruled. There is no archeological evidence of the existence of the queen.
