= Anuradhapura invasion of Pandya =

862 military campaign in India

- Part of Pandyan–Sinhalese wars
Date	862
Location	Pandya dynasty
Result	Pandyan victory: SriMara Sri Vallaba Successfully Resisted Maya pandya ( Varaguna ll) and Sinhala ( Sena ll) forces

Belligerents
Pandya kingdom	Anuradhapura Kingdom

Commanders and leaders
Srimara Srivallabha	Sena II; Kuttaka; Varagunavarman II

The siege of Madurai in 862 was a pivotal moment in the history of the Pandya Empire, with differing accounts regarding its outcome.This was a part of Sena II's retaliatory campaign against the devastation caused by Pandya incursions during his predecessor. According to Mahavamsa, the invasion ended in a victory for the Anuradhapura king, with the death of Srivallabha and the coronation of prince Varaguna II by general Kuttaka.According to the Pandyan side of the evidence makes the ruling king Srimara Srivallabha successful in repelling a Maya Pandya and Ceylon forces thus keeping his throne to himself at the end of the struggle.

== Background ==
As the 9th century progressed, Pandyas were drawn into war with the neighbouring Pallavas and Cholas, while Rashtrakuta invasions from the north also had to be kept in check. The Cholas, who had made an alliance with the Hoysalas and Eastern Ganga, constantly assaulted Pandyan territories and weakened their influence north of the Kaveri river. Hence, it can be suggested that earlier Pandya invasions into northern coasts of Sri Lanka was not intended for conquest, but to gather loot and supplies to continue funding their wars in the North. However, by the time of king Sena I of Anuradhapura, Pandya incursions into Rajarata territory had increased in scale, causing much devastation, and an invasion at the time of Sena I had sacked Anuradhapura itself. Sena was eventually forced to make terms with the Pandyas (and the Tamil forces were withdrawn from Sri Lanka). Sena would die having unable to bear the suffering induced on his people by the devastation.It was his successor Sena II who made preparations to pillage and pacify his northern rival as an act of revenge.

== Invasion of Pandya (Pandya sources) ==
The Lankan sources and Pandyan sources vary each other. According to the K. A Nilakanta Sastry Pandyan sources are reliable. He mentions in his book named 'Pandyan Kingdom' that "The Pandyan side of the evidence makes the ruling king successful in repelling a Maya Pandya and thus keeping his throne to himself at the end of the struggle, the Ceylon account makes out a disaster of the first magnitude to the Pandyan kingdom from the story of the counter-invasion undertaken by Sena partly in support of the Pandya prince There is no possibility of reconciling these accounts, one of them must be rejected as untrustworthy Now, on the face of it, it seems impossible to suppose that such a serious disaster befell the Pandya power in the reign of Srimara and that the Sinnamanur plates suppressed the truth or deliberately gave a false account of the reign. On the other hand, the Mahavamsa is a highly embellished and poetic account of the history of Ceylon. And one cannot help feeling that in this chapter of the Mahavamsa some transactions belonging to a later age (twelfth century A D.) have been repeated perhaps to take off the edge from the story of the conquest of Ceylon by the Pandya king, narrated a little earlier. When we come to the Pandyan civil wars of the twelfth century in which Ceylonese kings often interfered, we shall see that the Mahavamsa persistently colours the account favourably to the Ceylonese kings and commanders Our conclusion, therefore, is that Srimara did carry out a successful raid against Ceylon and that he repulsed the attempt at retaliation.

== Invasion of Pandya (Mahavamsa version) ==
According to the Lankan Sources, By 862, Sena II had formed a powerful naval fleet and a grand coalition, which set upon the Pandyan lands by landing at their southern coasts while the Pandyans were concentrating in the north. The invading force entered the weakly defended city of Madurai, and sacked it. Sena II requested the commander of the expeditionaries, Kuttaka, to look for treasures and bring back all the treasures of Anuradhapura taken by the Srimara Srīvallabha's forces. The forces of Sena II allied themselves with a Tamil rebel leader named, Varagunavarman. Srimara Srīvallabha was handling a Pallava invasion from the North. Despite this, the invasion from the southern flank caused him to flee to the North, however he died in warfare.

Varagunavarman II was crowned as king of Pandya by Kuttaka. After touring the Pandya country, Kuttaka returned to Anuradhapura with the treasure of Madurai.
