= Varaguna II =

Pandyan king from 862 to 879

Pandyan king
- Reign: 862–879
- Coronation: 862
- Predecessor: Srimara Srivallabha
- Successor: Parantaka Viranarayana Sadaiyan
- Died: 879
- Dynasty: Pandya

Varagunavarman II (Tamil: வரகுண வர்மன்), also known as Varaguna II, and Arimardhana, was a king of the Pandya dynasty in south India whose reign lasted from c. 862 until c. 879 CE. Varaguna II was famously defeated by a contingent of troops led by Pallava king Aparajita around 879 CE.

== Background ==
Srimara Srivallabha (r. c. 815—862 AD), the predecessor of Varaguna II, was defeated by the Pallava king Nrupatunga varman (the battle of Arisil). According to Mahavamsa Madurai was then sacked by the forces of the Lankan ruler Sena II and Maya Pandya. Maya Pandya was installed on the Pandya throne by the Sri Lankan army commanders. However this claim is disputed, According to the Pandyan side of the evidence makes the ruling king Srimara Srivallabha successful in repelling a Maya Pandya (Varaguna II) and sinhalese forces led by sena II thus keeping his throne to himself at the end of the struggle.

The Lankan sources and Pandyan sources vary each other. According to the K. A Nilakanta Sastry and other historians Pandyan sources are reliable. He mentions in his book named 'Pandyan Kingdom' that "The Pandyan side of the evidence makes the ruling king successful in repelling a Maya Pandya and thus keeping his throne to himself at the end of the struggle, the Ceylon account makes out a disaster of the first magnitude to the Pandyan kingdom from the story of the counter-invasion undertaken by Sena partly in support of the Pandya prince There is no possibility of reconciling these accounts, one of them must be rejected as untrustworthy Now, on the face of it, it seems impossible to suppose that such a serious disaster befell the Pandya power in the reign of Srimara and that the Sinnamanur plates suppressed the truth or deliberately gave a false account of the reign. On the other hand, the Mahavamsa is a highly embellished and poetic account of the history of Ceylon. And one cannot help feeling that in this chapter of the Mahavamsa some transactions belonging to a later age (twelfth century A D.) have been repeated perhaps to take off the edge from the story of the conquest of Ceylon by the Pandya king, narrated a little earlier. When we come to the Pandyan civil wars of the twelfth century in which Ceylonese kings often interfered, we shall see that the Mahavamsa persistently colours the account favourably to the Ceylonese kings and commanders Our conclusion, therefore, is that Srimara did carry out a successful raid against Ceylon and that he repulsed the attempt at retaliation.

== Battle of Idavai and vembil ==
Tiruchirappalli cave-inscription of the eleventh year suggests that Varaguna II secured victories at Idavai and Vembil over the Chola and Ganga forces and subsequently encamped at Araisur. It shows that he had been at Niyamam near Tanjore, after he had fought at Idavai and defeated the Ganga Chief and destroyed the fortifications of Vembil. Both of which places are on the north side of the Kavery river, and therefore in territory belonging to the Gangas.Ganga king Prithivipati I effected an alliance with the Pallava king Nripatunga, whose country was in danger from the Pandya's advance, and together the Ganga and Pallava forces the latter led by the crown prince Aparajita attacked Varaguna. An officer of his, who had accompanied Varaguna when he captured the town of Idavai on the north bank of the Kaveri, constructed a tank near Dindigul.

== Battle of Shripurambiyam ==
Varaguna tried to check the Pallava influence by marching north (and even crossing the Kaveri in the Chola country by c. 879 AD). The northern expedition may well have been directed against the rising power of the Cholas.

A decisive battle was fought at Sri Purambiyam (Tiruppurambiyam near Kumbakonam) in c. 880 AD. An alliance led by the Pallava Aparajita, supported by Chola Aditya I and Ganga Prithvipati I, opposed and defeated the Pandya king (although Prithvipati I lost his life in the battle). The Pandya advance was rolled back. The Chola king subsequently invaded the Pallava country and defeated Aparajita.

Varaguna was succeeded by his younger brother Parantaka Viranarayana around 880 AD.
