= Industry in ancient Tamil country =

During the Sangam age, industrial activity was considered ancillary to agriculture and was mostly domestic, not factory-based. Simple workshops where the blacksmith made the wheel or the carpenter his wooden wares could be called factories of a sort. Weaving, pearl fishing, smithy and ship building were some of the prominent industries of the ancient Tamil country. Cotton and silk fabrics from Madurai and Urayur were in great demand; the textiles from these regions were well known for their high quality. Korkai was the center of pearl trade and produced pearls that were sought after not only in Tamilakam, but in the kingdoms of north India and Rome. Smithy was an essential industry, because the blacksmith manufactured many of the tools and objects used in daily life. The flourishing overseas trade was supported by the shipbuilding industry that produced a variety of ocean and river craft. There were several ancillary industries such as carpentry, fishing, salt manufacture and construction that supported the trade and economic activity of this age.

== Weaving ==
Weaving was the most important industry. Spinning and weaving were widely practised crafts, next only to agriculture. In addition to being the full-time occupation of many people, weaving was practised part-time by the farmers in rural areas. Women spent their spare time spinning cotton threads and continued to spin during the night, by the faint light of a wick lamp. Madurai and Urayur were the important centers of the industry and were well known for their cotton textiles. The muslins carried very fine floral work of different colors and were compared to the slough of the cobra and the cloud of steam. Silk cloth was manufactured with its threads gathered in small knots at its ends. The art of embroidery was also known, with the nobles and aristocrats being the main customers for embroidered clothing. Dyeing was a widespread ancillary industry to weaving. The blue dye for the loin cloth was a favorite color among the masses. In addition to silk and cotton fabrics, cloth made of wood fibre called Sirai Maravuri and Naarmadi was used by the priestly class. Silk, wool and other fabrics are referred to as cloths of natural origin. In the markets of Madurai, woollen goods were sold alongside the cotton and silk goods. The cloth manufacturers wove long pieces of cloth at a time and delivered it to the dealers. The textile dealers then scissored off bits of required length, called aruvai or tuni, at the time of sale. The dealers themselves were called aruvai vanigar and the localities where they lived aruvai vidi. Stitched garments were worn by the people and there were tailors called tunnagarar in Madurai and other big towns. Weaving was not associated with the hilly regions, as the descriptions of life in such regions do not indicate any use of cotton garments.

== Pearl fishing ==
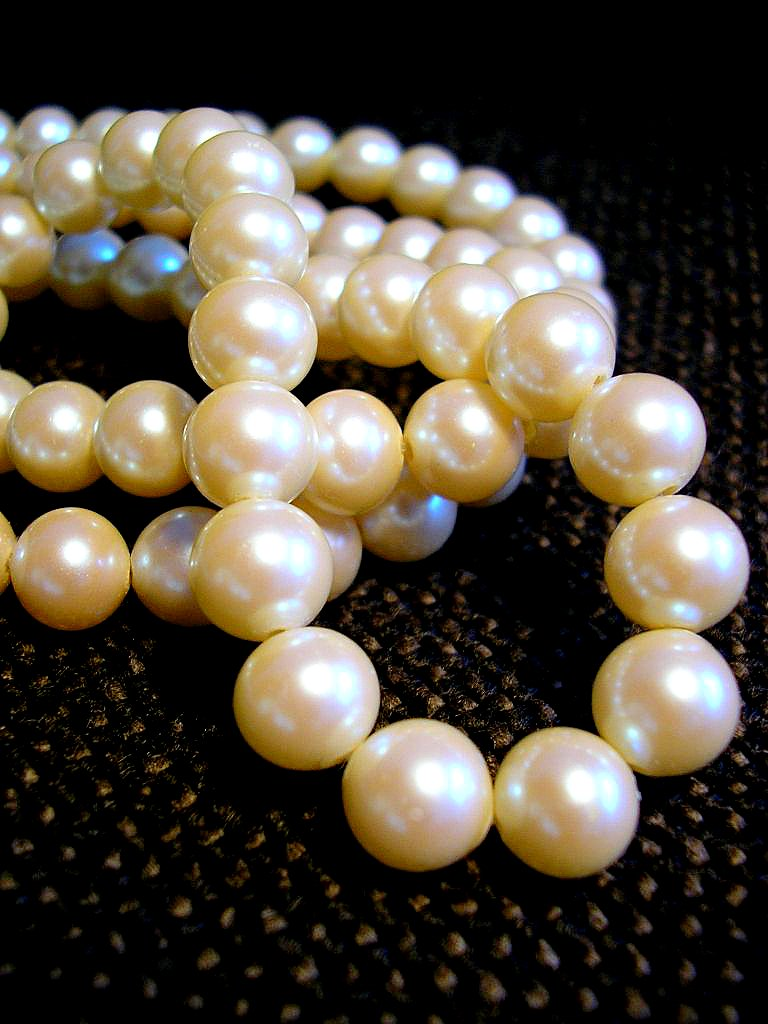
Pearl fishing was an important industry in ancient Tamilakam

Pearl fishing was another industry that flourished during the Sangam age. The Pandyan port city of Korkai was the center of pearl trade. But Thoothukudi is used for pearl fishing in these days. So Thoothukudi is now called as "Pearl City". Written records from Greek and Egyptian voyagers give details about the pearl fisheries off the Pandyan coast. The Periplus of the Erythraean Sea mentions that "Pearls inferior to the Indian sort are exported in great quantity from the marts of Apologas and Omana". The inferior variety of pearls that the Tamils did not require for their use was in very great demand in the foreign markets. Pearls were woven along with nice muslin cloth, before being exported. The most expensive animal product that was imported from India by the Roman Empire was the pearl from the Gulf of Mannar. The pearls from the Pandyan kingdom were also in demand in the kingdoms of north India. Several Vedic mantras refer to the wide use of the pearls. The royal chariots were decked with pearls, as were the horses that dragged them. The use of pearls was so high that the supply of pearls from the Ganges could not meet the demand. Literary references of the pearl fishing mention how the fishermen, who dive into the sea, avoid attacks from sharks, bring up the right-whorled chank and blow on the sounding shell. Convicts were used as pearl divers in Korkai.

== Smithy ==
The smithy, or the Panikkalari (literally: workplace), played an important role in the lives of ancient Tamilians (people of Tamil Nadu, India) Some of the essential items forged or repaired in the smithy include weapons of war, tools such as the plough, domestic utensils and the iron wheel. These ancient factories used a blow pipe or a pair of bellows (a turutti) to light the fire that was used for smelting and welding. These workplaces were not numerous, especially in the rural areas. Each smithy catered to the needs of many neighboring villages and hence was overworked. The art of the goldsmith seems to have caught the fancy of foreign markets and Tamil made ornaments were shipped to foreign lands mainly from karur.

== Ship building ==
Shipbuilding was a native industry in Tamilakam. Ocean craft of varying sizes, from the small catamaran which was a bunch of logs tied together to the big ships with mast and sail, were used in Tamil ports. Among the smaller crafts were ambi and padagu that were used as ferries across rivers and the timil which was a fishing boat. Pahri, Odam, Toni, Teppa, and Navai were other smaller craft. The large ship was called Kappal had masts (Paamaram) and sails (Poy).

== Other industries ==
Carpentry was practised as a hereditary profession. Sons of the carpenters learned their trade at an early age by making small toycarts for children. The carpenter assisted in home construction, ship building and chariot making. Making jaggery cakes out of the sugarcane juice, in rural factories was an organized activity. Forestry involved the growing of trees that produced aromatic wood such as sandal. People living in the coastal areas depended on fishing for their subsistence. The anglers had a small leather pouch attached to one end of the rod into which the fish were thrown and secured. Salt manufacture was the only other industry of the sea coast which was largely practised. Pottery, rope making, chank-cutting, gem cutting, manufacture of leather sheaths for war weapons, dealing in conches and ivory, manufacture of bangles and the making of religious structures such as temples, procession cars and images are other industries mentioned often in contemporary literature. Baskets made of wicker for containing articles of domestic use like grains and other dried articles of consumption were also very popular.
