= Doric Bungalow =

Ruined building in Mannar, Sri Lanka

- Alternative names: The Doric

General information
- Status: Ruins
- Construction started: 18 March 1802
- Completed: 11 February 1804
- Client: Governor Frederick North

Height
- Height: Two stories

Technical details
- Material: Bricks, mortar, chunam

The Doric Bungalow (also known as The Doric) at Arippu East, Mannar, Sri Lanka, was the residence of the first British Governor of Ceylon.

== History ==
The first governor, Frederick North, 5th Earl of Guilford, was the son of British Prime Minister Frederick North (2nd Earl of Guilford). The house was planned by the governor himself, the building was later known as 'The Doric' due to the architectural design of the columns which was similar to the Ancient Greek Doric order style. It was built at the beginning of the nineteenth century (between 1801 and 1804) to revive and supervise the pearl fisheries. Other than being used as the residence for the governor, it was later used by "other governors, government agents, and other officials, including superintendents of pearl fishery."

The two storey building was constructed using bricks and mortar though the exterior walls were decorated with chunam which was made from the lime of burnt oyster shells and was described as appearing like 'marble'.

A descriptive account of the bungalow can be found in the journal of Rev. James Cordiner (1775–1836), a chaplain attached to the British military garrison in Colombo, Ceylon, between 1797 and 1804.

"The Governor's house at Aripo, on the western coast of Ceylon is situated two miles north of the scene of the pearl fishery. It is undoubtedly the most beautiful building in the island, and almost the only one which is planned according to any order of architecture. But the house, although of splendid appearance, is of small dimensions; the internal accommodations not entirely corresponding with the grandeur and elegance of the outward structure"

"There are four small bedrooms on the ground floor, one at each corner; a spacious flight of stairs occupies the center; and two well proportioned rooms above extend from east to west of the building, ornamented on each side by graceful colonnades."

"One of these is used as a dining room, and calculated to contain a party of twenty persons. The other is his excellency's bedchamber. At one end of it a winding staircase is cut off, leading up to the terraced roof, from which there is a most extensive prospect of the level country in three directions."

— James Cordiner (1807)

Having been built on a low cliff near the beach, exposed to extreme weather and lack of maintenance, it is now mostly ruins. Restoration has been proposed several times but no work has been carried out despite it being declared a protected archaeological monument.

A number of folklore tales surround the site and it has been 'locally ascribed to a legendary Queen of the Sangam period which refers to Alli Raani who was said to have a palace at the site. There is no archeological evidence of the existence of the queen. There are also unsubstantiated claims that the Portuguese built the Doric and it was used to protect Dona Catherina of Kandy circa 1580.

Located a few hundred metres from the Doric, is the "Doric Beacon", a navigation aid in the form of an Obelisk.
