= Tammuzh =

Pandyan king

Tammuzh was a Tamil Pandyan king in the Tamzhil cultural realm of ancient South India, who held his capital at Kuadam. The language and cultural term 'Tamil' is an anglicized form of the native name 'Tamizhi' (தமிழ்), pronounced [tamiɻ]. See also 'Legendary Early Chola Kings,' which shows similarities between the early Chola kings and the Ur kings list. The Pandyans had trading contacts with Ptolemaic Egypt and, through Egypt, with Rome by the 1st century CE. The 1st-century Greek historian Nicolaus of Damascus met in Damascus the embassy sent by an Indian king named 'Pandion,' or, according to others, 'Porus,' to Caesar Augustus around 13 CE. The names of the king and his kingdom have likely been conflated in Nicolaus' account.
