= Parantaka Viranarayana Sadaiyan =

Parantaka Viranarayana
- Pandya king

Pandya dynasty
- Reign: late 9th century CE
- Predecessor: Varaguna II
- Successor: Maravarman Rajasimha II
- Dynasty: Pandya
- Father: Srimara Srivallabha

Parantaka Viranarayana Sadaiyan was a ruler of the Pandya dynasty who ruled in southern India during the late 9th century CE. He was a son of Srimara Srivallabha and the younger brother of Varaguna II. The larger Sinnamanur copper plates describe Parantaka as the younger brother of Varaguna. He was the father of Maravarman Rajasimha II, who succeeded him in the Pandya genealogy recorded in the same inscription.

Information about his reign comes principally from Pandya copper-plate grants and inscriptions, particularly the Dalavaypuram copper plates and the Sinnamanur copper plates. K. A. Nilakanta Sastri discusses Parantaka Viranarayana and his position in the later Pandya genealogy in The Pandyan Kingdom.

== Reign ==
Parantaka Viranarayana was the younger brother of Varaguna II. The larger Sinnamanur copper plates explicitly describe him as the younger brother of Varaguna and identify Maravarman Rajasimha II as his son. The chronology of the transition from Varaguna II to Parantaka Viranarayana has been discussed in the historical literature. Sastri places Parantaka among the later ninth-century Pandya rulers and records his succession by his son Rajasimha II. The chronology and dynastic succession of the later ninth-century Pandyas have also been discussed in recent scholarship.

== Military activities ==
The Dalavaypuram copper plates contain an account of military activities attributed to Parantaka Viranarayana. The record mentions fighting at Sennilam and refers to campaigns involving several other places and opponents. The identification of some of the places and persons mentioned in the record remains uncertain. The larger Sinnamanur copper plates provide additional information about Parantaka's military activities, mentioning fighting at Sennilam, Kharagiri and Pennagadam and the capture of a person named Ugra. David Pierdominici Leão also discusses the Dalavaypuram evidence in the context of the Pandyan dynastic narrative and Parantaka Viranarayana's reign.

== Dalavaypuram copper plates ==
The Dalavaypuram copper plates are an important primary source for the reign of Parantaka Viranarayana. The charter contains Sanskrit and Tamil portions and provides information concerning the Pandya genealogy, royal grants and administration. The plates are issued in the reign of Parantaka Viranarayana and are important evidence for the study of the Pandya kingdom during the late ninth century. Their contents include genealogical and administrative material as well as references to royal grants.

== Religious and irrigation patronage ==
The larger Sinnamanur copper plates describe Parantaka as a ruler associated with the establishment of Brahmin settlements, temples and tanks. The inscription therefore provides evidence for royal patronage of religious and irrigation institutions during his reign.

The larger Sinnamanur copper plates describe Parantaka as the younger brother of Varaguna and identify Rajasimha as the son of Parantaka and Vanavanmahadevi.

== See also ==
- Pandya dynasty
- Srimara Srivallabha
- Varaguna II
- Maravarman Rajasimha II
- Sinnamanur copper plates
- Dalavaypuram copper plates

== Bibliography ==
- Sastri, K. A. Nilakanta (1929). The Pandyan Kingdom: From the Earliest Times to the Sixteenth Century. London: Luzac & Co.
- Sastri, K. A. Nilakanta (1958). A History of South India: From Prehistoric Times to the Fall of Vijayanagar. Oxford University Press.
- Raman, K. V. Dalavaypuram Copper Plates (PDF).
- Pierdominici Leão, David (2025). Breaking the Crown of Indra: The Pāṇḍyas and Their Dynastic Identity in the South Indian Context.
