= Srimara Srivallabha =

9th-century Pandya king of south India

- Ekavira ( Unparalleled warrior) , ParacakraKolahala (The Confounder of the Circle of his Enemies ) , Avanipasekara ( Protector of the Earth )
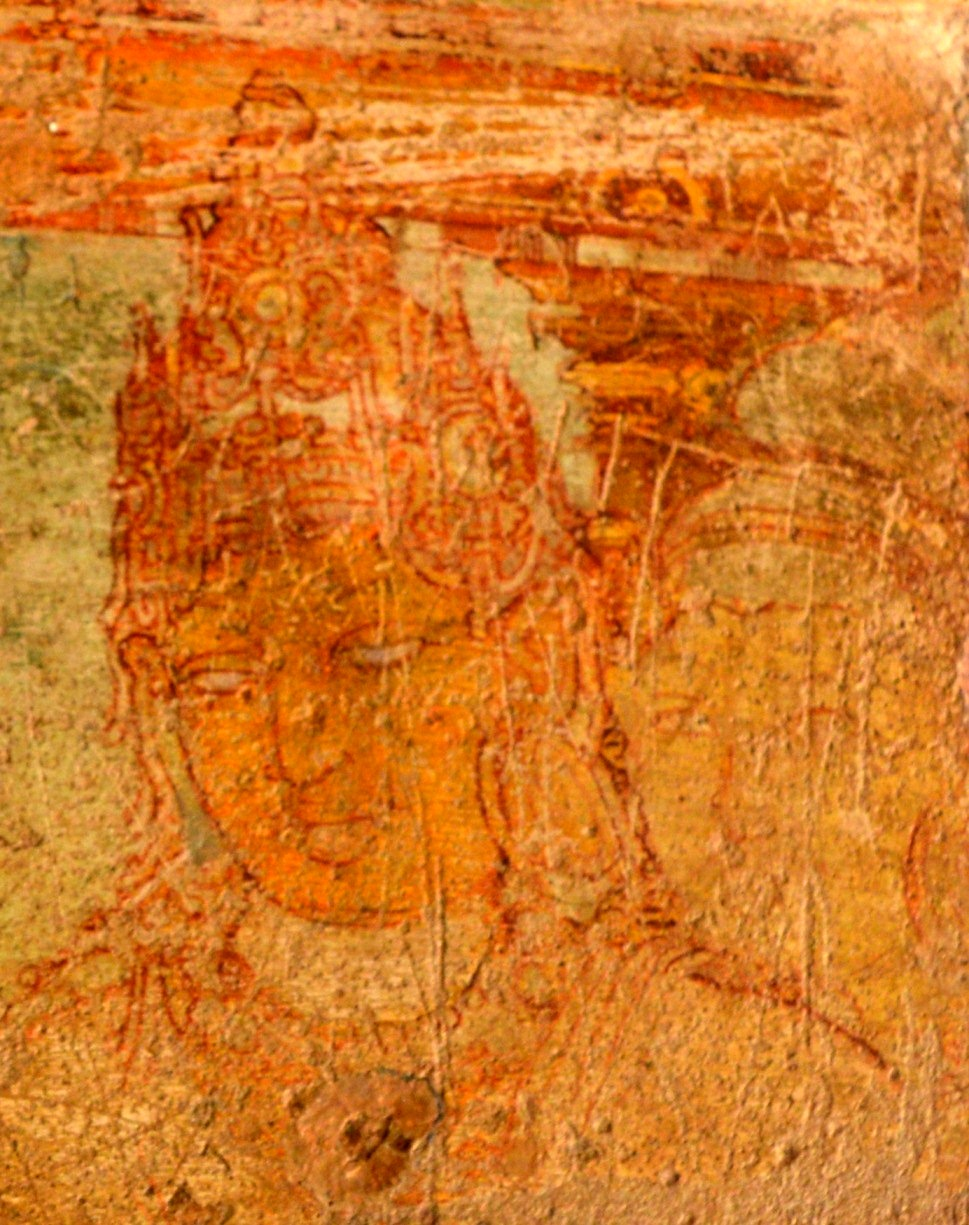
- Painting from Chittanavachal (Pudukkottai), believed to be that of the king Srimara Srivallabha and his queen

Pandya dynasty
- Reign: c. 815–c. 862 AD
- Predecessor: Varagunavarman l (parantaka nedunchadaiyan)
- Successor: Varagunavarman II
- Dynasty: Pandya
- Father: Parantaka Nedunchadaiyan (Varaguna I)

Srimara Srivallabha (r. c. 815–c. 862 CE; Tamil: ஸ்ரீமாறன் ஸ்ரீவல்லபன்) was a Pandya king of early medieval South India.

== Sources and titles ==
Srimara bore the title Parachakra Kolahala ("the Confounder of the Circle of his Enemies"). The primary epighraphical record of his reign is the bilingual Sanskrit–Tamil Larger Sinnamanur pate grant. This was supplemented from the Pallava perspective by the Bahur Plates of Nripatunga.

He was the son and successor of Parantaka Nedunchadaiyan (Varaguna I). According to Dalavayapuram copper plates of his younger son Parantaka Viranarayana, Srimara married Akkalanimmati, a princess of the Pottapi Chola family and daughter of king Srikantha Chola. His eldor son and successor was Varaguna II.

In inscriptions, he is identified by the regal name Sadaiyan Maran and by the birudas Ekavira (unrivaled hero) and Avanipasekhara (crest-jewel of the earth).

== Military campaigns ==
=== Western and southern campaigns ===
The Sanskrit section of the Larger Sinnamanur plates records that Srimara defeated the Cheras of Kerala, the king of Simhala, the Pallavas and the Vallabha (Rashtrakutas), while subduing an internal claimant known as Mayapandya. In the southwest, Srimara campaigned against the Cheras in Venad, winning battles at Kunnur and the coastal port of Vizhinjam.

He subsequently launched a seaborne invasion of northern Sri Lanka during the reign of King Sena I of Anuradhapura (r. 833–853 CE). The Pali chronicle Mahavamsa corroborates the Pandya victory at Mahatalita. It records that Sena I abandoned his capital and fled into central Malaya highlands, while his sub-king Mahinda committed suicide. Pandyan forces occupied and plundered Anuradhapura, carrying off royal treasures before Srimara concluded a peace treaty with the exiled monarch and withdrew his army.

=== Wars with the Pallavas ===
In the northern theater, Srimara encountered a coalition organized by the Pallava king Nandivarman III. The coalition included the Western Gangas, the Cholas, and the Rashtrakutas. The allies defeated Srimara at the Battle of Tellaru (near modern Vandavasi), forcing the Pandyas to retreat southward while Pallava forces advanced toward the Vaigai River. Srimara reorganized his army and counter-attacked, defeating teh allied coalition at Kudamukku (Kumbakonam) around 859 CE. In the Dalavayapuram plates, he is also credited with defeating Pallava forces at Anur. However, Nandivarman III's son Nripatunga later defeated Srimara at the Battle of Arichil on the banks of the Arisalar River.

=== Claimed Pala encounter ===
The Larger Sinnamanur plates claim that Srimara defeated an allied confederacy at Kudamukku that included the Magadhas. The reference to the “Magadhas” has been interpreted by some epigraphists as contingent troops linked to the Pala Empire of Devapala. In turn, the Monghyr copper plate of Devapala claims the subjugation of 'Dravida' monarch, which historian R. C. Majumdar suggested could refer to the Pandya ruler Srimara. But, most historians identify the term with the Rashtrakutas or regard both accounts as coventional courtly hyperbole.

=== Rise of the Cholas and succession conflict ===
Around 850 CE, Vijayalaya Chola captured Thanjavur from the Mutharaiyars, who had functioned as Pandyan subordinates. This reduced Pandya influence north of the Kaveri River. Taking advantage of Srimara's preoccupation with northern campaigns, Sena II of Sri Lanka (r. 853–887 CE) allied with a dissident prince designated in records as Maya Pandya (Varaguna II). Sena II then launched a counter-invasion on the Pandyan mainland. Sinhalese forces marched on Madurai, but failed to sack the city and installing Varaguna II on the Pandya throne. While the Sinnamanur plates portray Srimara as successfully repelling Maya Pandya and his allies, other records indicate he succumbed to battle wounds shortly after the capture of his capital.

Histographical interpretations differ regarding the end of his reign. Historian K. A. Nilakanta Sastri argued that the Mahavamsa narrative of an overwhelming Pandyan collapse reflected later literary embellishment projected backwards from the 12th-century civil wars. He favored the Sinnamanur records of a successful Pandyan defense. Later epigraphists, note that Srimara's reign ended around 862 CE after successfully defended his country.His son Varaguna II ascended the throne immediately.
