= Alli Raani =

Legendary Tamil queen of the Sangam period

- Alli Arasani
- Reign: Sangam Period, Kudiramalai
- Coronation: Madurai
- Predecessor: Neenmugan
- Dynasty: Pandyan Dynasty

Alli Rani (Tamil: அல்லிராணி, lit. 'Queen Alli'), also known as Alli arasi, is a legendary Tamil queen of the Sangam period, who is thought to have ruled the whole western and northern coast of Sri Lanka from her capital Kudiramalai. According to folklore, her fort, Allirani fort, is located in Mannar, Sri Lanka. She is sometimes seen as an incarnation or multiform of Meenakshi and Kannagi. Legends attribute her as an "Amazon" ruler, who had an administrative and an army of only women, with male being their subordinates and servants.

There are references to her in several texts such as Alli katai, Alli Arasani Maalai, Pavazhakodi Maalai and Pulavendran Kalava Maalai. She is also depicted in a popular dramatic compilation in Tamil language, entitled as Alli Arasani Nadakam.

== Legend ==
The only daughter of a Pandyan king, she was considered an immaculate conception as she was found on an alli (Tamil word for lily) after the end of a Putrakameshti ritual. She was at young age sent to gurukula and perfected riding and martial arts. Alli Raani is described as courageous and alert. She defeated and killed in a battle an usurper to the Pandyan throne named Neenmugan, "The blue faced one", who came at her with an army. After the victory was she crowned to the throne of Madurai.

Several myths attribute her as being married to the Mahabharata hero Arjuna. Arjuna who penetrated the palace of Alli Raani, took the form of an old ascetic man. He called out for the love of the queen, who responded back by sending snakes and elephants to kill him. Arjuna later on came to her room in the form of a snake as she was asleep, thereupon embracing the queen. According to other versions of this myth is this event followed by a marriage with Arjuna tying the Thaali on Alli Raani.

Alli Raani ruled over the in western and northern coasts of Sri Lanka and controlled there the pearl fishery. According to local traditions did the gulf of Arasadi have no opening towards the north, but communicated with the sea by a channel running in the line of the present Chilaw canal. Alli Raani used to proceed from Kudiramalai to Akkaraipattu by land. A great flood submerged greater parts of land, subsequently leaving Arasadi on a narrow split of land, forming the present Puttalam Lagoon and destroying her palace.
