= Korkai =

Korkai Vazhavallan
- Village
- Location in Tamil Nadu, India Korkai (India)
- Coordinates: 8°38′0″N 78°4′0″E
- Country: India
- State: Tamil Nadu
- District: Thoothukudi
  - Rank: 5M x 10M.

Population (2011 census)
  - Total: 3,986

Tamil
  - Agriculturists: Tamil
- Time zone: UTC+5:30 (IST)
- Nearest Village: Vazhavallan

Korkai is a small village in the Srivaikuntam taluk of Thoothukudi district in Tamil Nadu, India. It was called Pandya-Kavada in the Kapatapuram in Kalithogai. It is situated about 3 km north of the Thamirabarani River and about 6 km from the shore of Bay of Bengal.

== History ==
Korkai was the capital, principal center of trade and important port of the Early Pandyan Kingdom. At that time, it was located on the banks of the Tamiraparani River and at the sea coast, forming a natural harbour. Due to excessive sedimentation, the sea has receded about 6 km in the past 2000 years, leaving Korkai well inland today.

The famous urn burial site, Adichanallur, is located about 15 km. from Korkai.

In ancient times, Korkai was a well known center of pearl fishery; it is mentioned often in the Sangam literature and in classical western literature. Ptolemy refers to the place as Kolkhai and says that it was an emporium. The Periplus says that the Pandyan kingdom extended from Comari towards the north, including Korkai, where the pearl fisheries were.

A 2000-year-old 'Vanni' tree is in Korkai.

Correct identification of Korkai by archaeological excavations came in 1838. The findings of megalithic burial urns at Korkai indicates that it was fairly well populated during megalithic times. Carbon dating of the artifacts in the area indicates an age of 785 BC. The finds of black and red pottery ware with old Tamil Brahmi scripts (two to four letters in a line or two), apart from drawn graffiti of the sun, fish, bow and arrow have been dated to a period between the 3rd century BC and 2nd century AD. The occurrence of Roman ware, and rouletted ware indicates external links. Archeologists have found ruins of chunk cutting factories, centres for split opening of pearl oysters at the site.

Palaeo-channels traced from the satellite imagery scenes all around Korkai indicate that the Tamiraparani river has shifted its course progressively east and south and earlier it had mixed with sea near Thoothukudi. Interpretation of satellite imagery indicates that in the 1st and 2nd century CE, the Tamiraparani river might have flowed towards northeast from Eral, parallel to the coast and joined the sea south of Thoothukudi. Korampallam tank, Peykulam, and Arumugamangalam tank might be the relicts of palaeo channel of the Tamiraparani river. Within a short span of nearly 2000 years, now Korkai is nearly 6 Kilometers away from Bay of Bengal and 3 Kilometers north of Thamirabarani, which was once a port and in the banks of the Tamirabarani and Thoothukudi has no river.

== See also ==
- Early Pandyan Kingdom
- Economy of ancient Tamil country
- Industry in ancient Tamil country
