= Kudiramalai =

Kudiramalai කුදිරමලෙයි குதிரைமலை
- Hamlet
- Location within Sri Lanka
- Coordinates: 8°32′0″N 79°52′0″E
- Country: Sri Lanka
- Province: North Western Province

Kudiramalai (Tamil: குதிரைமலை, romanized: Kutiraimalai, Sinhala: කුදිරමලෙයි, romanized: Kudiramaleyi ) is a cape and ancient port town on the west coast of Sri Lanka.

On the Gulf of Mannar near Silavaturai, the town shares a history with nearby Karaitivu Island, the ancient port town of Mannar and the Ketheeswaram temple. Kudiramalai is the northernmost point of Puttalam District and was a southern port of Mannar during the classical period, serving the northern kingdoms of the Jaffna Peninsula and Vanni country as one of their southernmost border towns. It is west of Vanni from Trincomalee, home of Koneswaram temple.

Rulers included Alli Raani, Korran, his father (Pittan) and contemporaries, Athiyamān Nedumān Añci and his son Kumanan. Traders brought several horses on watercraft to the island during the Sangam period. The port was known as Hippuros by Pliny (Nat. Hist. Book 6, 24). Archaeological excavations have found that Kudiramalai was inhabited from the first century BCE to the seventh century CE.

== History ==
=== Classical period ===
Kudiramalai shares the legends of the Tamil queen Alli Raani with Mannar; during her rule, major changes to the western coastline occurred. According to legend, she often travelled from Kudiramalai to Mannar and traded Mannar pearls for horses from Arabia; this is how the port town acquired its name. Although the Gulf of Mannar inundated much of Kudiramalai in a cyclone or tsunami, a portion of the walls of Queen Alli's palace are still visible. An ancient, cave-like structure is at the upper part of the palace wall's entrance. According to Alexander Johnston, he had a history of Queen Alli (who ruled northwestern Sri Lanka 1,800 years before him).

The Tamil chief Korran, a commander-in-chief of the Chera dynasty under King Makkotai, ruled Kudiramalai during the first century BCE. An avid horseman and patron of poets, he was known as Kattuman Korran ("Horseman Korran"). Korran's father was Pittan, another Chera chief. His name is sometimes written Pittan-Korran, following the Tamil naming convention in the Tolkāppiyam.

Korran oversaw trade with Phoenicia, Romans, Serica and Egypt. Inscriptions in Tamil-Brahmi script from the first century BCE to the first century CE bearing his name (Korra-Puman; Korra the Chieftain) were found in an amphora fragment at the Roman port of Berenice Troglodytica in present-day Egypt. Korran's rule is described at length in the Purananuru and he is eulogised in several Sangam poems. He ruled the region with two other chieftains: Elini Athiyamān Nedumān Añci and Kumanan. Chief Elini of Kudiramalai is described at length in the Purananuru and Akanaṉūṟu.

French biblical scholar Samuel Bochart first suggested Tamilakam, whose people were known for their gold, pearl, ivory and peacock trade, for the ports of Ophir and Tarshish during King Solomon's reign. According to Bochart, Tarshish was Kudiramalai. Old Tamil words for ivory, apes, cotton cloth and peacocks were imported by the Israelites and preserved in the Hebrew Bible.

Settlements of culturally-similar early populations of ancient Sri Lanka and ancient Tamil Nadu were excavated at megalithic burial sites at Pomparippu on the west coast (just south of Kudiramalai) and in Kathiraveli, on the island's east coast. Resembling early Pandyan Kingdom burials, these sites were established from the fifth century BCE to the second century CE. Kudiramalai shared a similar Tamil name with the northern Sri Lankan port of Kandarodai, known as Kadiramalai, on the Jaffna Peninsula.

=== Medieval period ===
By the medieval period, the capital moved from Kudiramalai to Nallur. Nearby Puttalam was the medieval Jaffna kingdom's second capital during the pearling season, and increased fishing activity was noted along the banks between Kudiramalai and Mannar.

Mukkuvar Tamils began migrating from Kilakarai in mainland Tamilakkam to Kudiramalai and other Malabar cities (such as Puttalam and Jaffna) of the northern kingdom during the eighth century. The Shaivites fled to the west coast from mainland Tamilakkam to escape forced conversion to Islam. In return for aid from Arabs in a struggle with a rival chief, many embraced Islam. During the 16th-century increase in Portuguese influence, many of the Mukkuvars converted to Christianity.

== See also ==
- Chera Dynasty
- Kandarodai, Jaffna
