= Madurai Adheenam =

Saivite monastery in Tamil Nadu, India

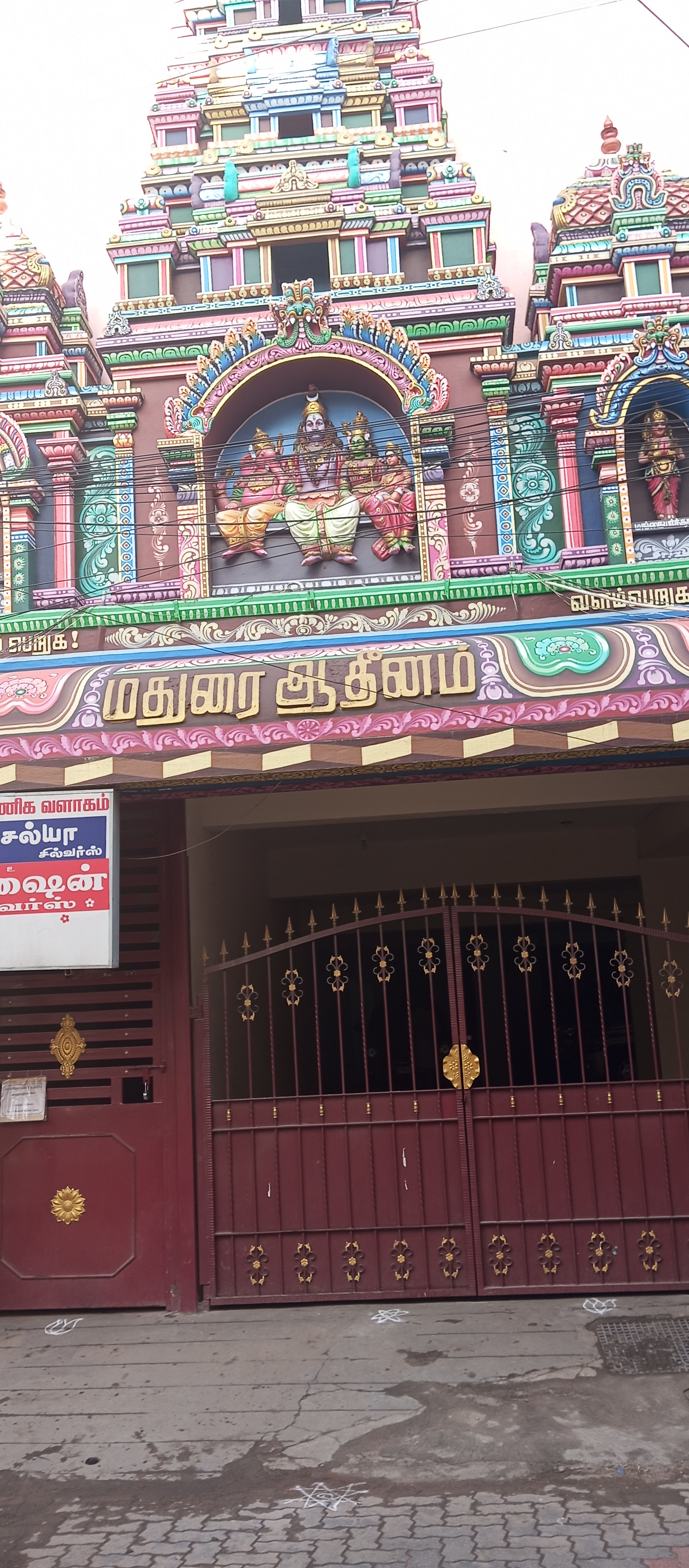

Madurai Adheenam is the oldest Saivite adheenam (also known as a matha or mutt), a form of Hindu monastery, in South India. It was established more than 1,300 years ago, and is said to have been rejuvenated by Thirugnana Sambandar. It is located near the Meenakshi Amman Temple in Madurai, Tamil Nadu, one of the most important Shiva–Shakti shrines. It is an active centre of Saiva Siddhanta philosophy.

The Mutt is headed by Sri La Sri Harihara Sri Gnanasambanda Desika Swamigal who took over as the 293rd pontiff of the Madurai Adheenam, at a grand coronation ceremony that took place on 23 August 2021. The Mutt also administers four temples in Thanjavur district and Tiruvarur district, namely Agniswarar Temple, Kanjanur, Sakshinatheswarar Temple, Thiruppurambiyam, Kaichinam Kaichineswarar Temple and Pannakaparanar temple.

== Religious activities ==
The Mutt is located in South Avani Moola street, close to Meenakshi Amman temple in Madurai. The Adheenam is involved in publishing Saivite literature, specifically Thevaram and Tiruvasakam and its translations. It is also involved in literary scholarship. The Adheenam along with Thiruppanandal Adheenam and Dharmapuram Adheenam were founded during the 16th century to spread the knowledge of Saiva Sidhantam. The Mutt offers Annadhanam (free meals) to devotees in its premises and also the four temples administered by them. The Mutt organizes special worship practices like Nithya and Maheswar Pooja.

== Lineage ==
In 2016, Madurai Adheenam was headed by Srila Sri Arunagirinatha Gnanasambantha Desika Paramacharya, who is the 292nd Guru Maha Sannidhanam or Pontiff of the Aadheenm. Arunagirinatha had appointed V. Thirunavukarasu as Ilavarasu or successor, with the given holy name of Srila Sri Kumara Sundara Gnanasambanda Desika Paramacharya. In 2019, the Adheenam became the subject of a legal dispute when Arunagirinatha removed Kumara Sundara and appointed Srila Sri Harihara Gnanasambanda Desika Paramacharya as the new Ilavarasu, with the Saivaneri Meetpu Peravai filing a petition at the Madras High Court that alleged that Kumara Sundara has not been legally removed at the time of the new appointment.

The 27th head of Dharumai Adheenam, declared that junior pontiff Harihara Sri Gnanasambanda Desika Swamigal, who was appointed by Arunagirinatha on June 6, 2019, as his successor, would become the 293rd pontiff. Sri La Sri Harihara Sri Gnanasambanda Desika Swamigal took over as the 293rd pontiff of the Madurai Adheenam, at a grand coronation ceremony that took place on 23 August 2021. Sri La Sri Harihara Sri Gnanasambandha Desika Swamigal was born in a village called Udankudi in Tirunelveli. He became a saint when he was 21-years old. For about 39 years, he has held different positions in famous Shaivite mutts such as Kundrakudi Adheenam, Thiruvavadudurai Adheenam and Dharmapuram Adheenam.

== Temples ==
The adheenam is the hereditary trustee of four temples in Thanjavur District.

Name of the temple	Location	Presiding deity	Photo	Temple details
Agniswarar Temple, Kanjanur	Kanjanur 11°3′57″N 79°29′45″E	Agniswarar		The temple is one of the nine Navagraha temples of Tamil Nadu and is a part of the popular Navagraha pilgrimage in the state - it houses the image of Sukra (Venus).
Sakshinatheswarar Temple, Thiruppurambiyam	Thiruppurambiyam 10°29′N 78°41′E	Sakshinatheswarar		Thiruppurambiyam was the fierce battlefield in the 9th century deciding the bright future of Cholas. Chola king Aditya I built a temple in sweet remembrance of the turn of the tide in his favour and named it Aditeswaram. An inscription on the west wall of the central shrine from the period of Gandaraditya Chola indicates a gift of 2 ma of land to the temple by Savandi Kumaran, Madevan of Idayarkudi, a local chieftian of Innambarnadu.
Kaichinam Kaichineswarar Temple	10°37′27″N 79°40′03″E	Kachaneswarar		It is a Hindu temple located at Kachanam in Tiruvarur district, Tamil Nadu, India. The historical name of the place is Kaichinam. The temple is dedicated to Shiva, as the moolavar presiding deity, in his manifestation as Kaichineswarar.
Pannakaparanar temple	Thirmugathalai 10°33′23″N 79°40′46″E	Pannakaparanar		
