= Battle of Thirupurambiyam =

879 battle

Date	879 CE
Location	Thirupurambiyam
Result	Alliance victory

Belligerents
Pallava dynasty Western Gangas; Medieval Cholas	Pandya kingdom Pallava factions

Commanders and leaders
Aparajitavarman; Prithvipati I †; Aditya I	Varagunavarman II; Nriputungavarman

Strength
Unknown	Unknown

Battle of Thirupurambiyam was fought between the Pandya king Varagunavarman II and a confederacy of the Pallavas, Western Ganga Dynasty and the Medieval Cholas in about 879 CE in the village Thiruppurambiyam near modern-day Kumbakonam of Thanjavur district. The Pandyas lost the battle with Varagunavarman II going into retirement.

The battle is considered to be a turning point in the history of South India for it precipitated the fall of the Pallava and Pandya kingdoms and triggered the re-emergence of the Chola power in history after centuries of obscurity during Kalabhra rule.

== Causes ==
At the dawn of the 9th century, the Pallava kingdom which had ruled most of South India for three centuries began to decline. Seizing the opportunity provided by weak Pallava rule, the Pandya king Varagunavarman tried to force the Pallava king Aparajitha into submission. The Tiruchirappalli cave inscription dated to his eleventh regnal year states that Varaguna II defeated the Chola and Ganga forces at Idavai and Vembil and later encamped at Araisur. The Chola king Vijayalaya, then a feudatory of the Pallavas, and his son Aditya Chola I, came to his assistance. Aparajitha was also assisted by the Western Ganga king Prithvipati I. Involvement of Vijayalaya Chola in the battle is still in debate since he is said to be deceased in 870 AD, about nine years before the war happened.

== Events ==
The forces of the Pallava kingdom, Western Ganga kingdom and the Chola kingdom met the Pandyan army at Shripurambiyam (Thiruppurambiyam in the Thanjavur district of present-day state of Tamil Nadu) in 879 CE. Though, according to the Udyendiram plates of Prithvipati II, Prithvipati I was killed after a brave fight, the allies were still able to salvage a pyrrhic victory.

== Consequences ==
The Pandyas were completely devastated as a result of the battle and never recovered from the loss for two centuries. The Pallavas, though victorious, were forced to give heavy concessions to their rising Chola feudatories, who declared their independence. The Pallava kingdom was eventually annexed by the Cholas during the reign of Vijayalaya Chola's son Aditya I. What started as an internecine conflict between the Pallava heirs blew up into a huge war which set the tone for the Chola regime for the next few centuries.
