= Sakshinatheswarar Temple, Thiruppurambiyam =

Hindu temple in Tamil Nadu, India

Sakshinatheswarar Temple
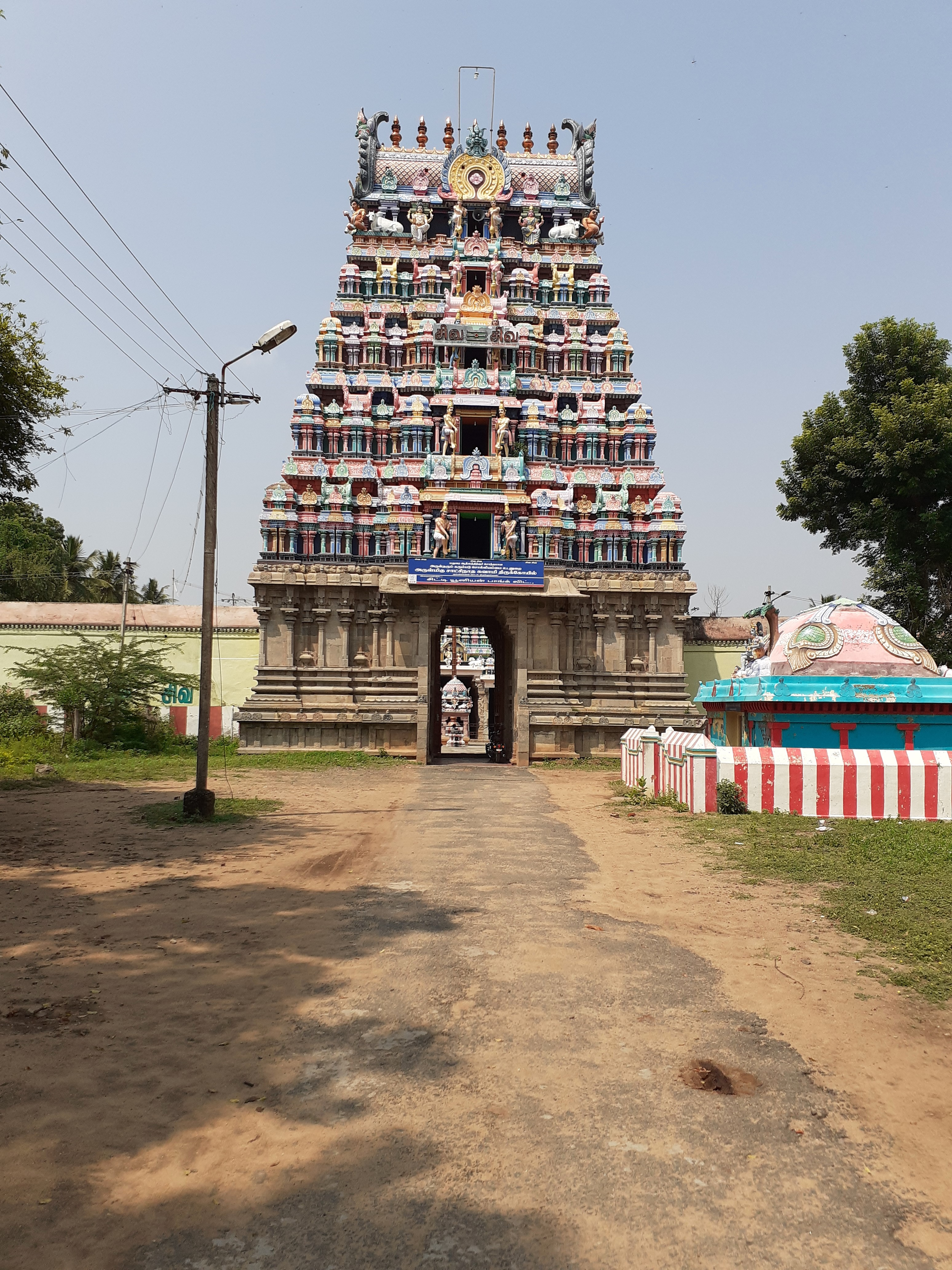

- Location in Tamil Nadu

Religion
- Affiliation: Hinduism
- District: Thanjavur
- Deity: Sakshinatheswarar (Shiva) Kuraivila Azhagi (Parvathi)

Location
- Location: Thiruppurambiyam
- State: Tamil Nadu
- Country: India
- Coordinates: 10°29′N 78°41′E

Architecture
- Type: Dravidian architecture

Sakshinatheswarar Temple or Thiruppurambiyam Temple is a temple dedicated to the Hindu god Shiva in Thiruppurambiyam, Tamil Nadu, India. Shiva is worshipped as Sakshinathar, and is represented there by a Lingam. His consort, Parvati, is depicted as Ikshuvani. The presiding deity is revered in the 7th century Tamil Saiva canonical work, Thevaram, written by Tamil saint poets, known as the Nayanmaars and classified as Paadal Petra Sthalam.

The temple complex covers two acres and is located close to the Sarangapani temple. It houses two gateway towers known as gopurams. The tallest is the western tower, with five storeys and it has a height of 72 feet (22 m). The temple has numerous shrines, with those of Sakshinathar, Ikshuvani, and Dakshinamurthy being the most prominent.

The masonry structure was built during the rule of Nayak in the 16th century. At present, the temple is maintained and administered by Madurai Adheenam.

== Legend ==
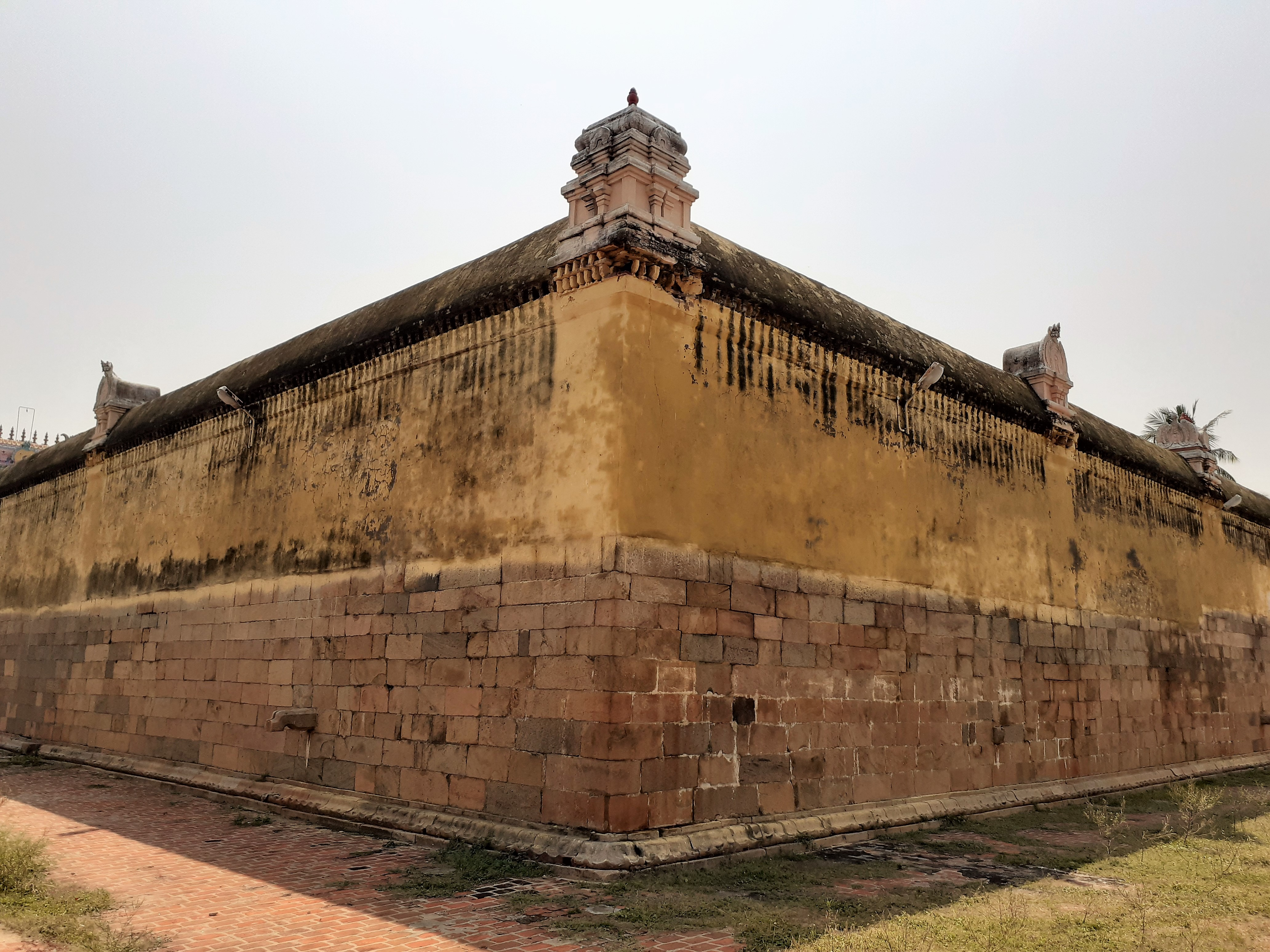
The second precinct

As per Hindu legend, Shiva descended to give evidence (Sakshi in Tamil) for a Chettiar lady and hence the presiding deity came to be known as Sakshinathar. Vannimaram, a tree also gave evidence in the same case. The legend is documented both in Thiruvilaiyadal Puranam and the legend of the temple. As per another legend, the place was not affected by the great deluge (puram) and remained beyond it (puram), which is locally called Thirupurambiyam. Once, Shiva appeared as Dakshinamurthy when a farmer carrying log of wood worshipped Shiva in this place. The shrine of Dakshinamurthy outside the gateway tower is believed to be the place where Shiva appeared. As per another legend, there was a king named Ariduvssan who was cursed by sage Durvasa. He worshipped Shiva at this place to relieve himself off the curse.

== History ==
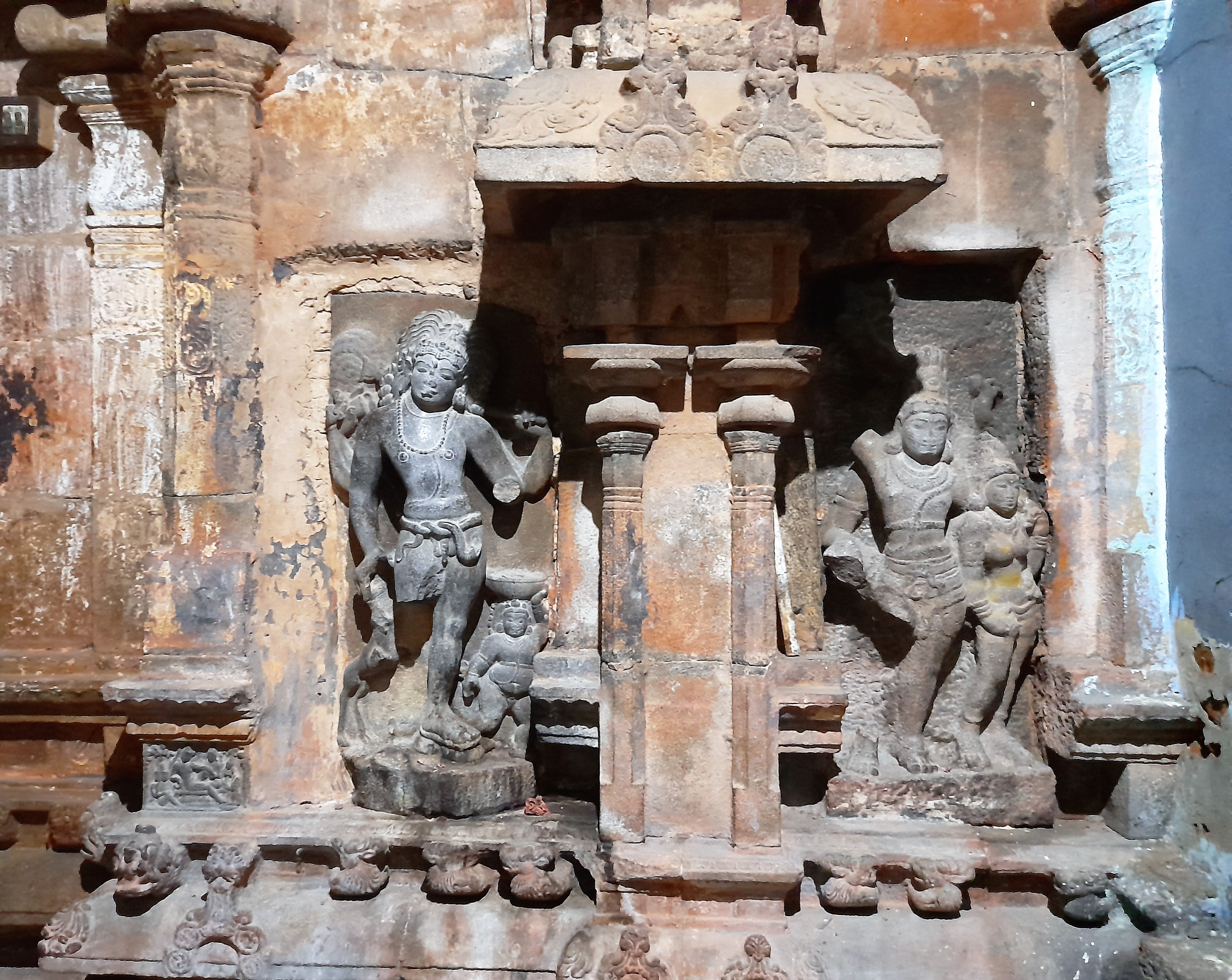
The panel around the sanctum

Thiruppurambiyam was the fierce battlefield in the 9th century deciding the bright future of Cholas. Chola king Aditya I built a temple in sweet remembrance of the turn of tide in his favour and named it Aditeshwaram. The present name of the presiding deity is Sakshinathar, and the consort's name is Kuraivilla Azhagi (Goddess with unsurpassed beauty). The sanctum of the consort was built by the Chola King Rajaraja Chola I. The sanctum wall contains beautiful sculptures of Parivara devatas(other deities of Siva temple). Lord Ganesa, the elephant god is performed honey showering on the day of Vinayagar Chaturthi and all the honey showered down on Him is absorbed. The temple is counted as one of the temples built on the northern banks of River Kaveri. An inscription on the west wall of the central shrine belonging to the period of Gandaraditya Chola indicates that a gift of 2 ma of land was given to the temple by Savandi Kumaran, Madevan of Idayarkudi, a local chieftian of Innambarnadu.

== Architecture ==
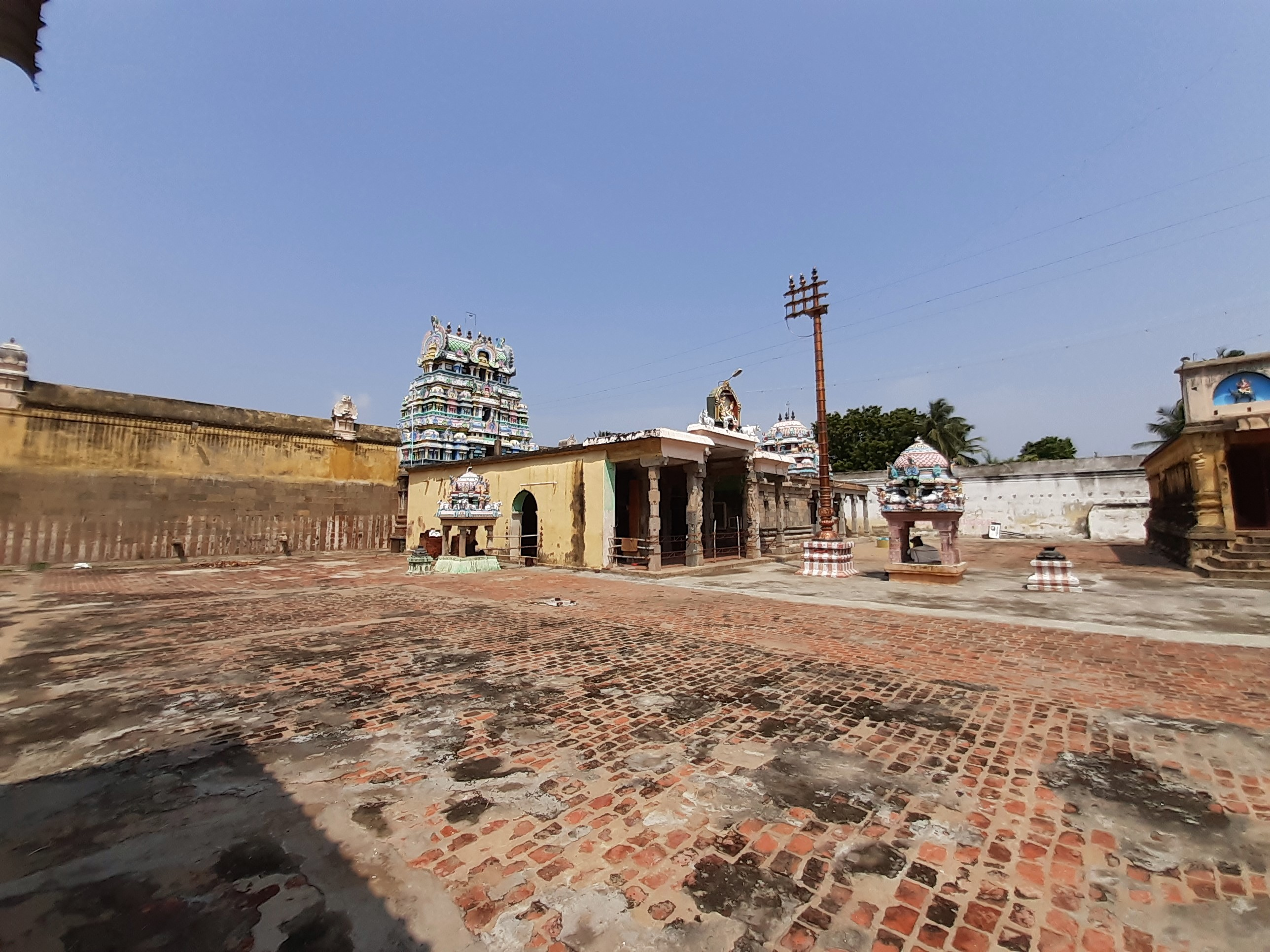
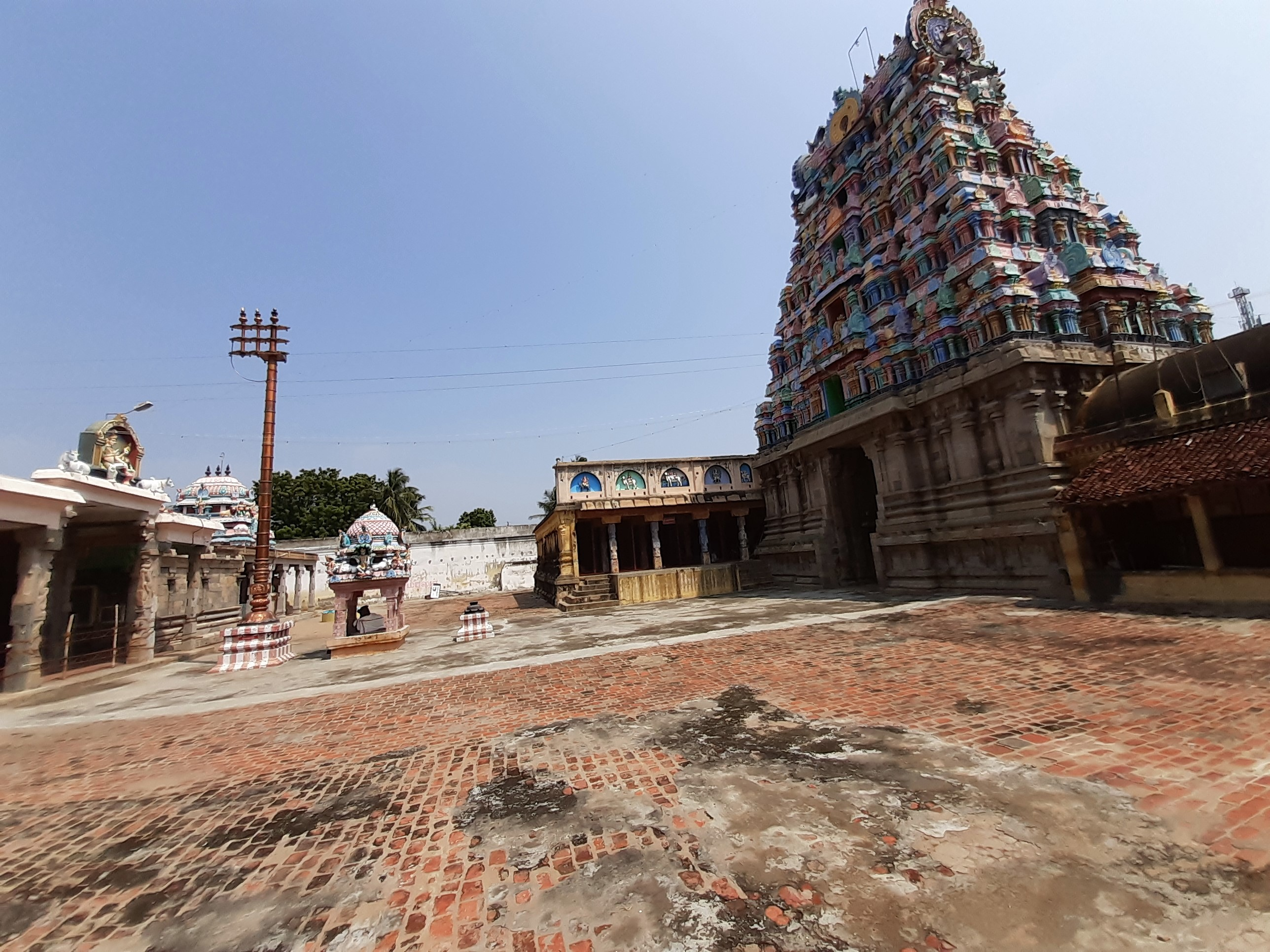
Shrines within the temple

The temple has a 5-tier Rajagopuram and an outer prakaram (closed precincts of a temple). The sanctum of Sakshinatheswarar is in the second precinct and the shrine of Amman is located perpendicular to the Swami shrine. The shrine is Nandi is located in front of Swami, with the Palipeeda and Dwajasthambam located right behind the Nandi. There is a Nataraja hall and a yagasalai. There are separate shrines for Natarajar, Somaskanda, Karpaga Vinayagar and Navagrahas. There are separate shrines for Nalvar, Dakshinamurthy, Nrithivu Nayakkar, Arthanariswarar, Mahalakshmi, Arumugam, Brahma, Durga and Chandikeswarar. There are four water bodies associated with the temple.

== Religious significance ==
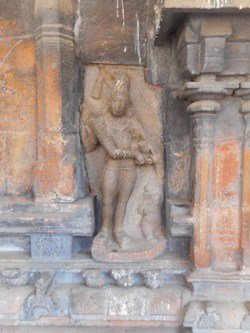
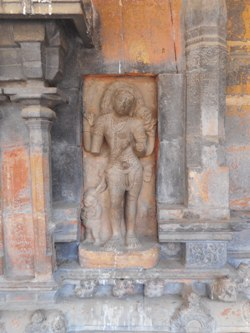
Sculptures in the temple panel

The temple finds mention in Tevaram, the 7th century 12 volume Saiva canonical work by Tamil saints, namely Appar, Sundarar and Campantar. It is one of the shrines of the 275 Paadal Petra Sthalams glorified in the Saiva canon. During the Vinayagar Chathurthi festival, ablution is performed on the Vinayagar deity with honey, which is absorbed by the deity. The temple is counted is one of the 24 important centres associated with Dakshinamurthy.
