= Hinduism in Tamil Nadu =

Tamil Hindus
தமிழ் இந்துக்கள் Tamiḻ intukkaḷ
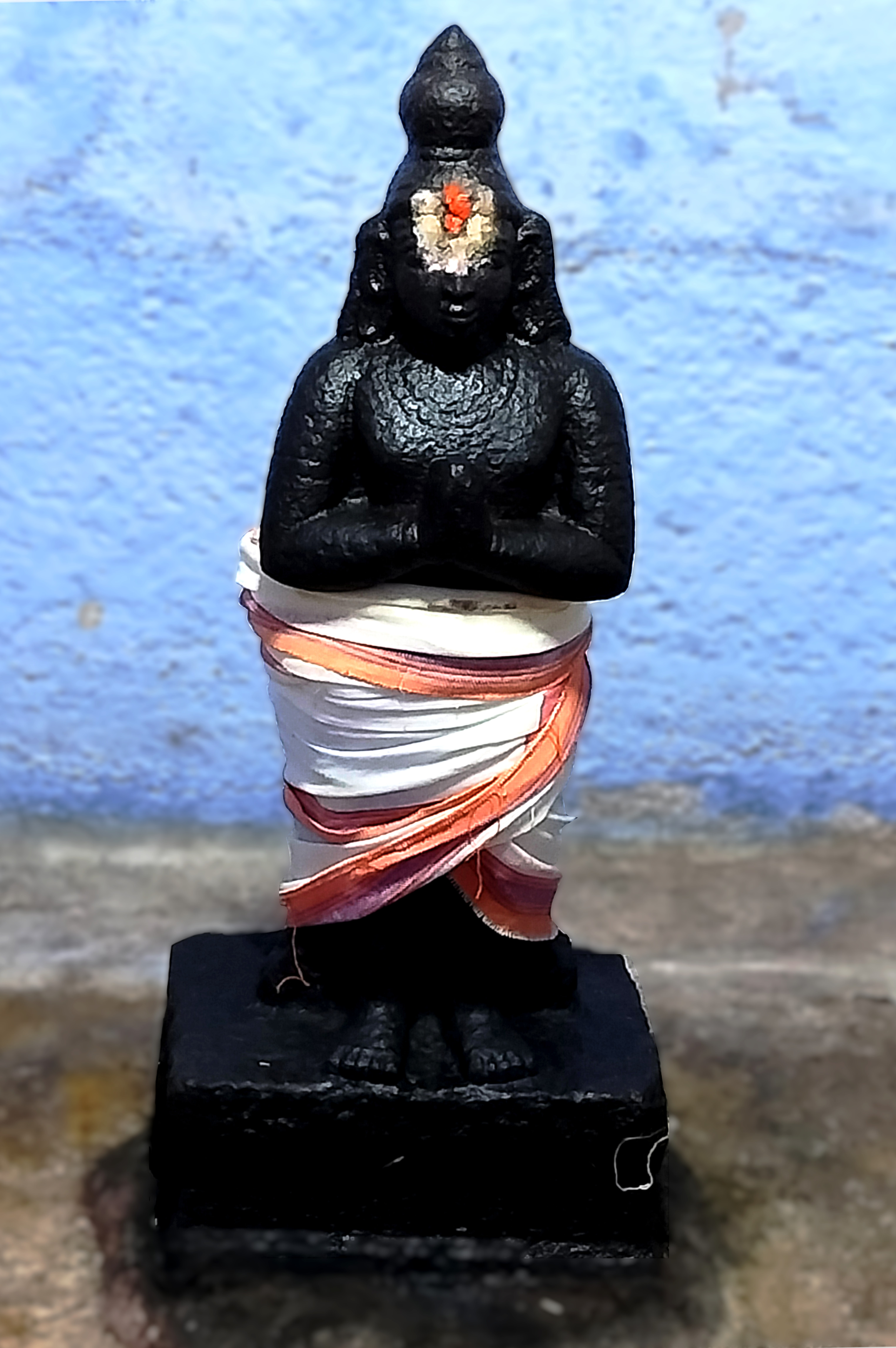
Poigai Alvar

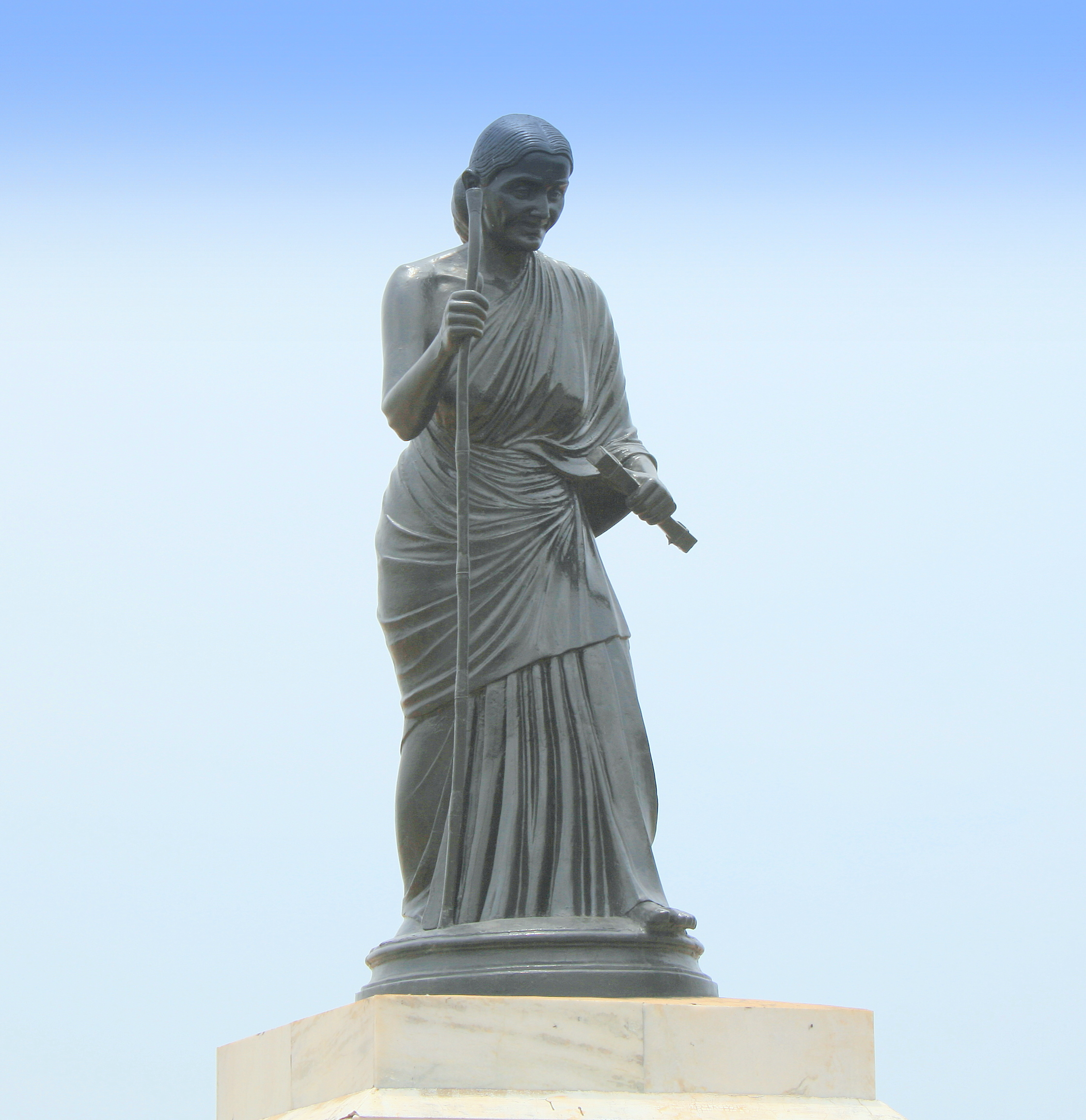
Avvaiyar

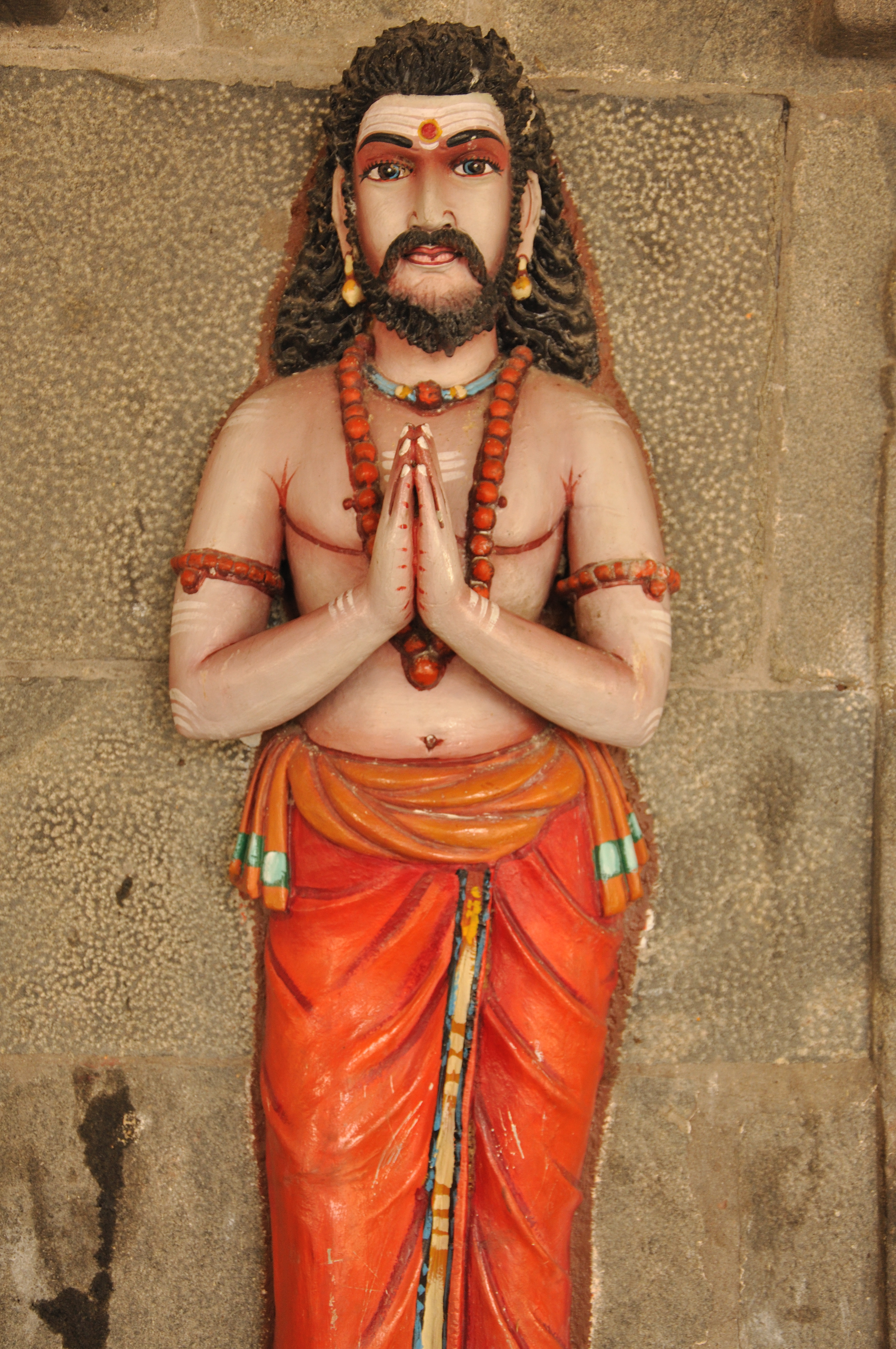
Arunagirinathar

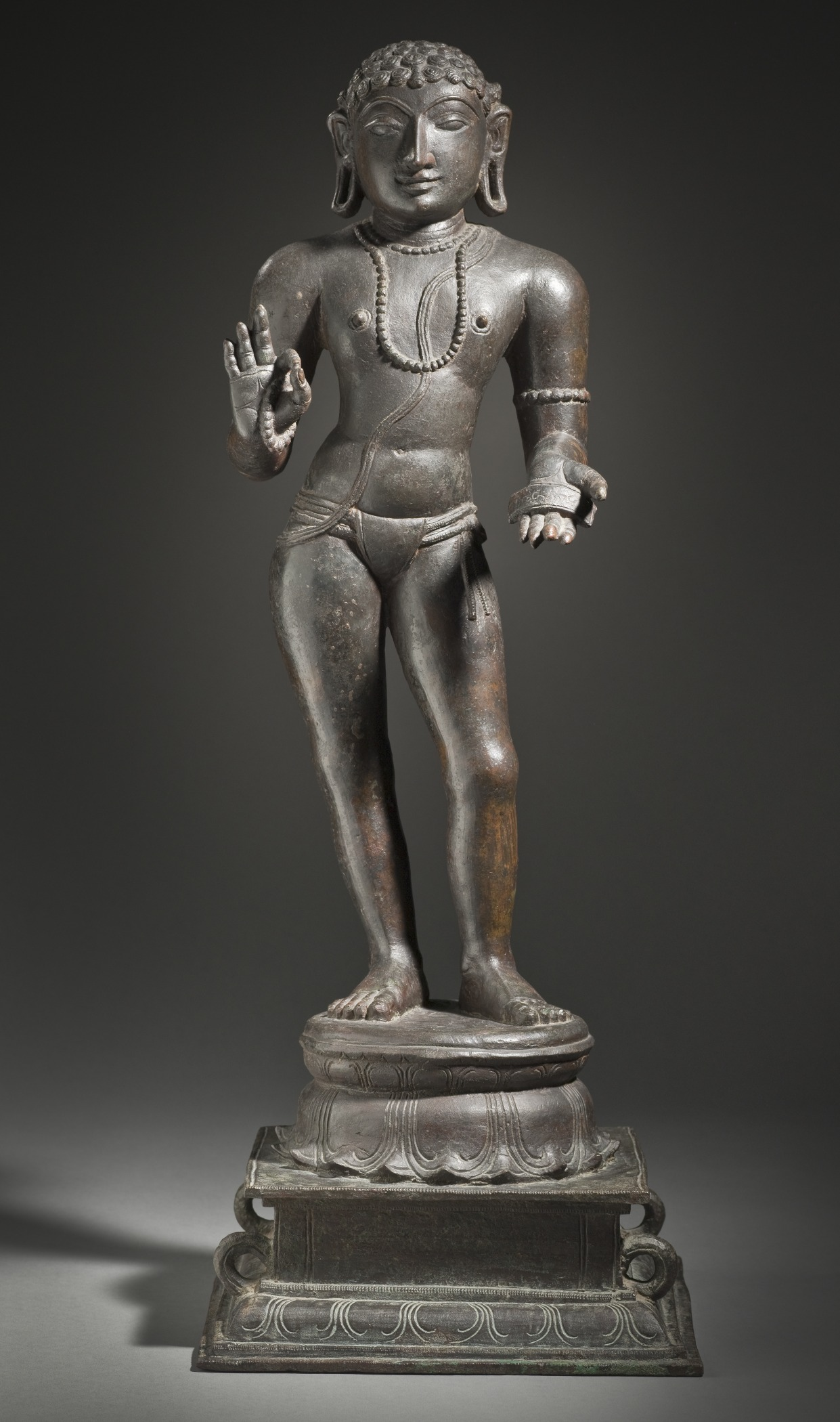
Manikkavacakar

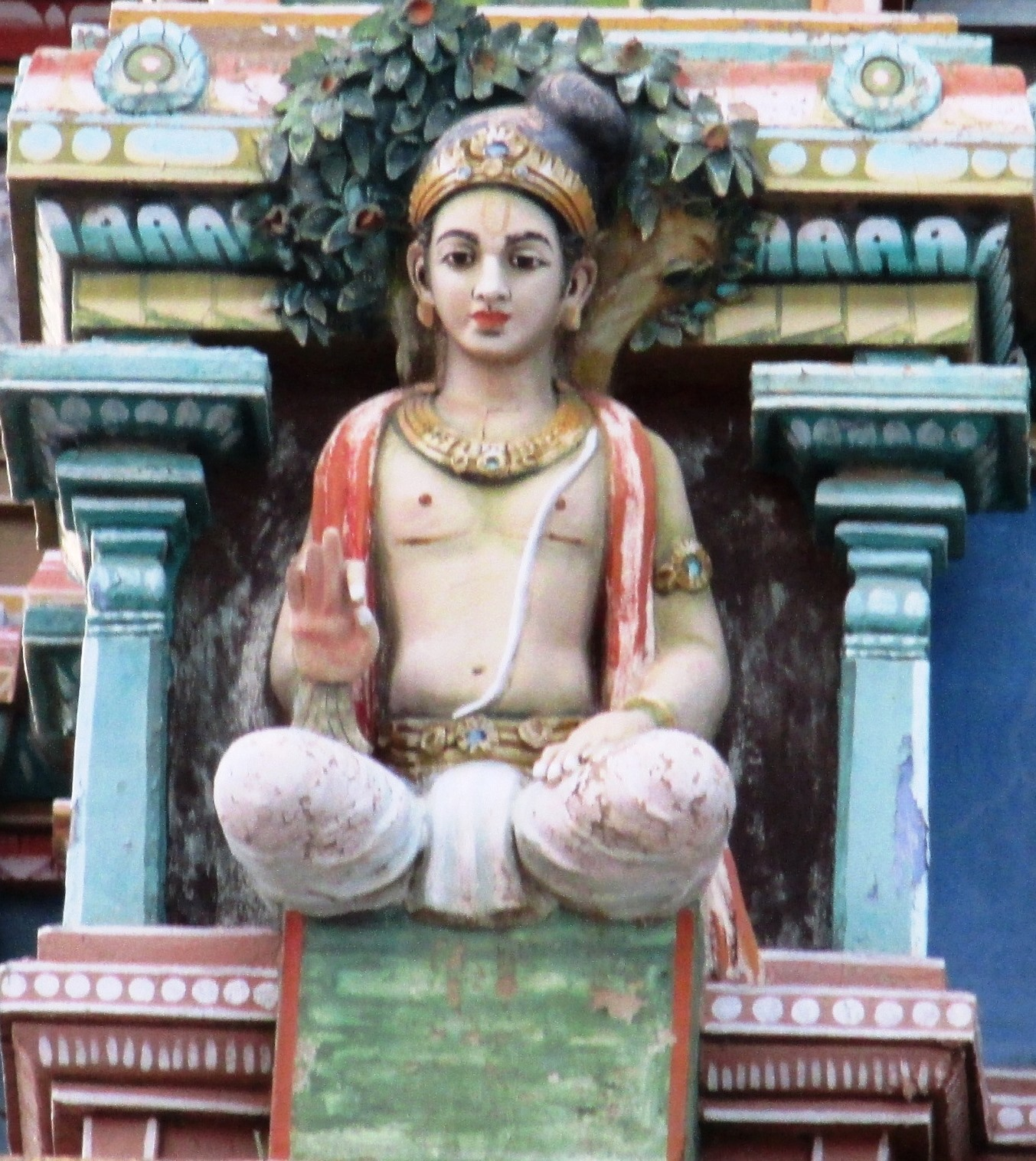
Nammalvar

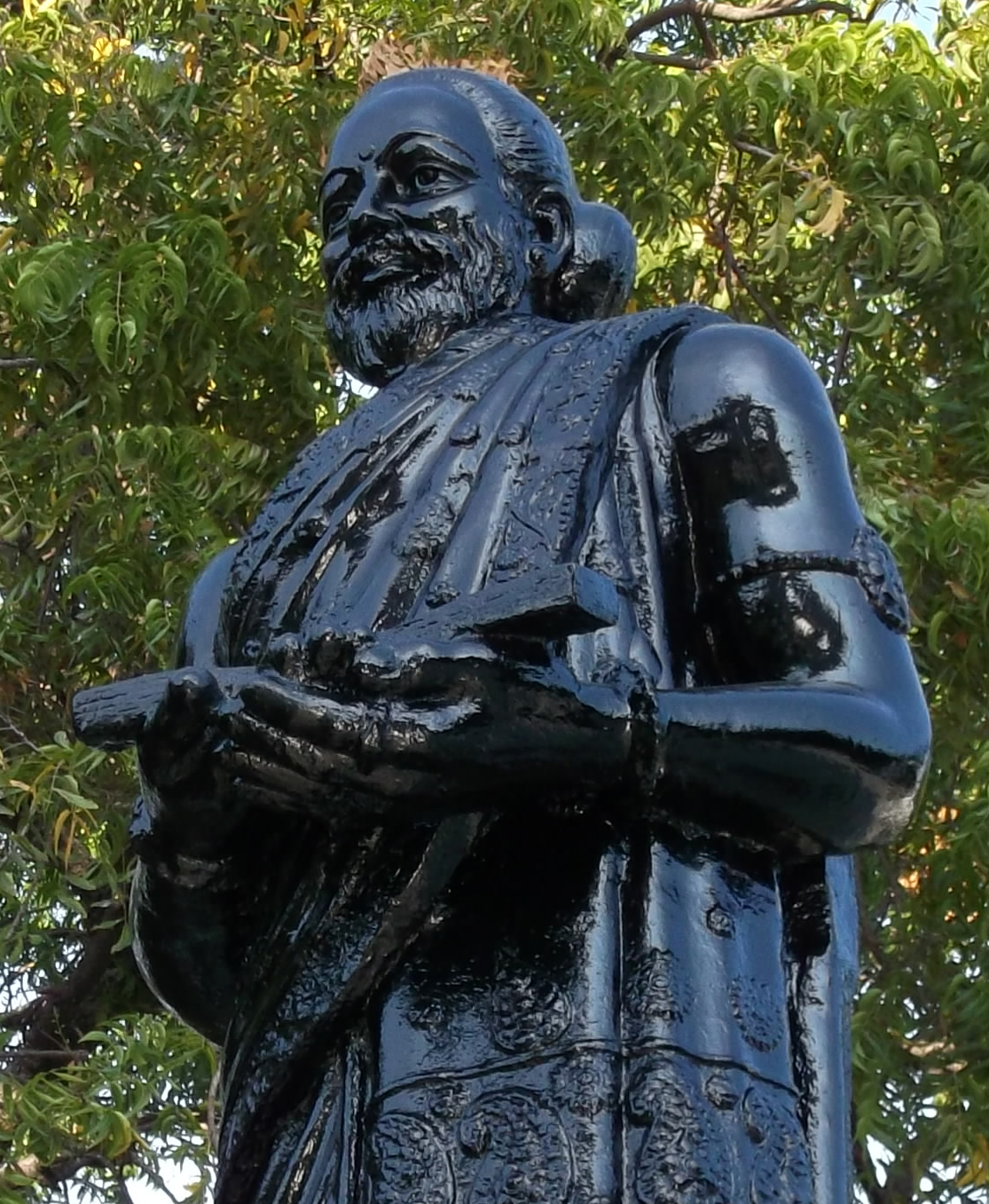
Kambar

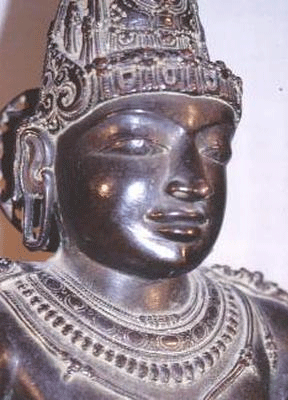
Rajaraja Chola

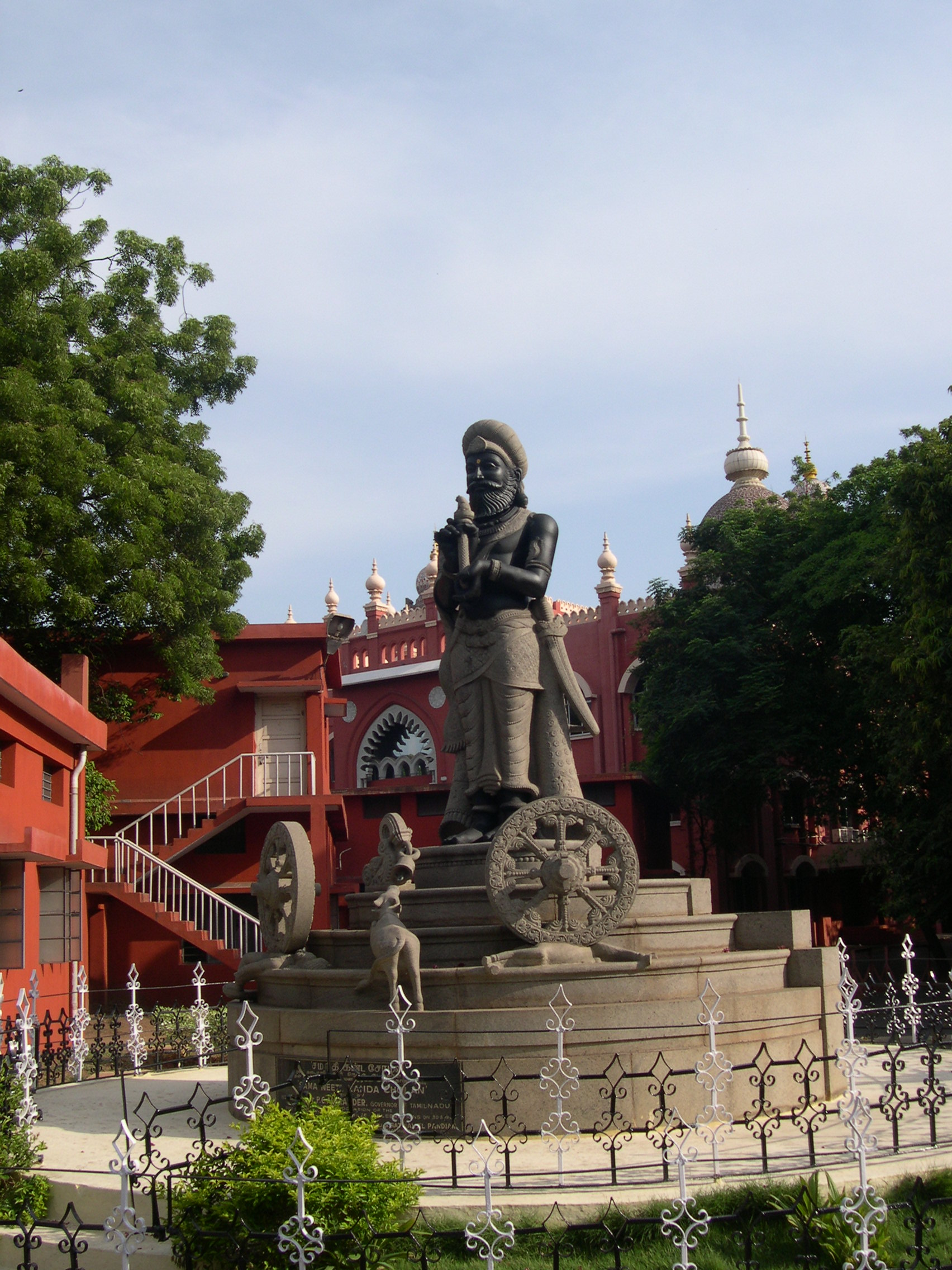
Ellalan

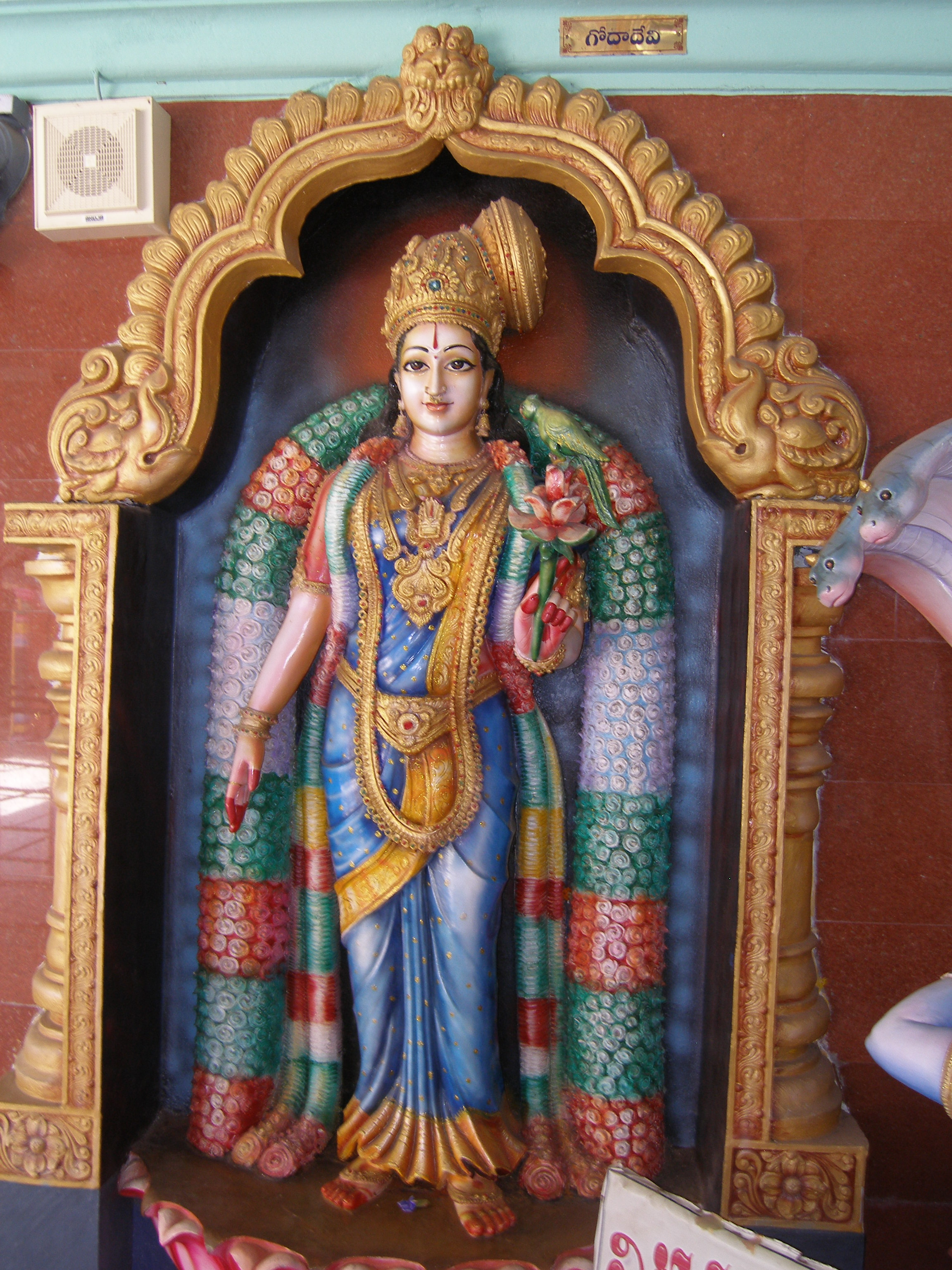
Andal

Total population
- 63,188,168 (2011); 87.58% of the Tamil Nadu Population

Regions with significant populations
- Tamil Nadu; Kerala, Karnataka, Andhra Pradesh, Telangana

Languages
- Tamil

Religion
- Hinduism • Shaivism • Vaishnavism • Shaktism • Dravidian folk religion

Hinduism in Tamil Nadu finds its earliest literary mention in the Sangam literature dated to the 5th century BCE. The total number of Tamil Hindus as per 2011 Indian census is 63,188,168 which forms 87.58% of the total population of Tamil Nadu. Hinduism is the largest religion in Tamil Nadu.

The religious history of Tamil Nadu is influenced by Hinduism quite notably during the medieval period. The twelve Alvars (poet-saints of the Vaishnava tradition) and sixty-three Nayanars (poet-saints of the Shaiva tradition) are regarded as exponents of the bhakti tradition of Hinduism in South India. Most of them came from the Tamil region and the last of them lived in the 9th century CE.

There are few worship forms and practices in Hinduism that are specific to Tamil Nadu due to the Bhakti movement spreading them across India. There are many mathas (monastic institutions) and temples based out of Tamil Nadu. In modern times, most of the temples are maintained and administered by the Hindu Religious and Endowment Board of the Government of Tamil Nadu.

== History ==
=== Ancient period ===
Tolkappiyam, possibly the most ancient of the extant Sangam works, dated between the 3rd century BCE and 5th century CE glorified Thirumal and Murugan as the favoured god of the Tamils. According to Kamil Zvelebil, Vishnu was considered ageless (The god who stays for ever) and the Supreme god of Tamils where as Murugan was considered young and a personal god of Tamils.

Sangam literature mentions several Hindu gods and Vedic practices around Ancient Tamilakam. Tamilians considered the Vedas as a book of Righteousness and is used to perform Yagams or Velvi. Several kings have performed Vedic Sacrifices and prayed to various gods of Hinduism. Ramachandran Nagaswamy an Indian historian, archaeologist and epigraphist states that Tamil Nadu was The Land of the Vedas and all Sangam people followed the Vedas. King Karikala Cholan is recognised as the greatest king of the Early Cholas. Karikala Cholan is mentioned in the poem 224 of Purananuru that he performed Vedic Rituals in the court of Righteousness where justice is well practiced after those conversant with proper custom. The text Purananuru further mentions that Cholas were the descendants of Lunar dynasty King Shibi Chakravarthi in poem 37, 39, 43 and 46. Tamils also prayed to Several Hindu gods such as Shiva, Vishnu, Brahma, Durga, Lakshmi, Indra, Varuna, Kartikeya, and even to Avatars of Vishnu like Varaha, Narasimha, Vamana, Parashurama, Rama, Balarama and Krishna and many other gods. The Sangam text Perumpāṇāṟṟuppaṭai states that Lord Vishnu Who took the Vamana Avatara is the father of the four faced Brahma who was born from Vishnu's navel and from Brahma came the Chola dynasty. the poem further mentions a Yūpa post (a form of Vedic altar) and a Brahmin village. Vedas are recited by these Brahmins, and even their parrots are mentioned in the poem as those who sing the Vedic hymns. The text states a temple for Vishnu in the city of Kanchi which is present even now, the lines 429 to 434 mention the town Thiruvekka and mentions the god Vishnu sleeping in a reclining pose. Tirumurukāṟṟuppaṭai is one of the Eight Anthologies and is dedicated to the Hindu god Karthikeya. It also mentions many other gods Like Vishnu, Shiva, Indra, Uma, Thirty-three gods, Gandharvas, Sages. Paripadal also mentions that The Thirty-three gods arose from Vishnu. After the Sangam period the Alvars and Nayanmars were born. These two groups promoted Vaishnavism and Shaivism which lead to the growth of Hinduism.

S. Krishnaswami Aiyangar states that the lifetime of the Vaishnava Alvars was during the first half of the 12th century, their works flourishing about the time of the revival of Brahminism and Hinduism in the north, speculating that Vaishnavism might have penetrated to the south as early as about the first century CE. There also exists secular literature that ascribes the commencement of the tradition in the south to the 3rd century CE. U.V. Swaminathan Aiyar, a scholar of Tamil literature, published the ancient work of the Sangam period known as the Paripatal, which contains seven poems in praise of Vishnu, including references to Krishna and Balarama. Aiyangar references an invasion of the south by the Mauryas in some of the older poems of the Sangam, and indicated that the opposition that was set up and maintained persistently against northern conquest had possibly in it an element of religion, the south standing up for orthodox Brahmanism against the encroachment of Buddhism by the persuasive eloquence and persistent effort of the Buddhist emperor Ashoka. The Tamil literature of this period has references scattered all over to the colonies of Brahmans brought and settled down in the south, and the whole output of this archaic literature exhibits unmistakably considerable Brahman influence in the making up of that literature.

=== Medieval period ===
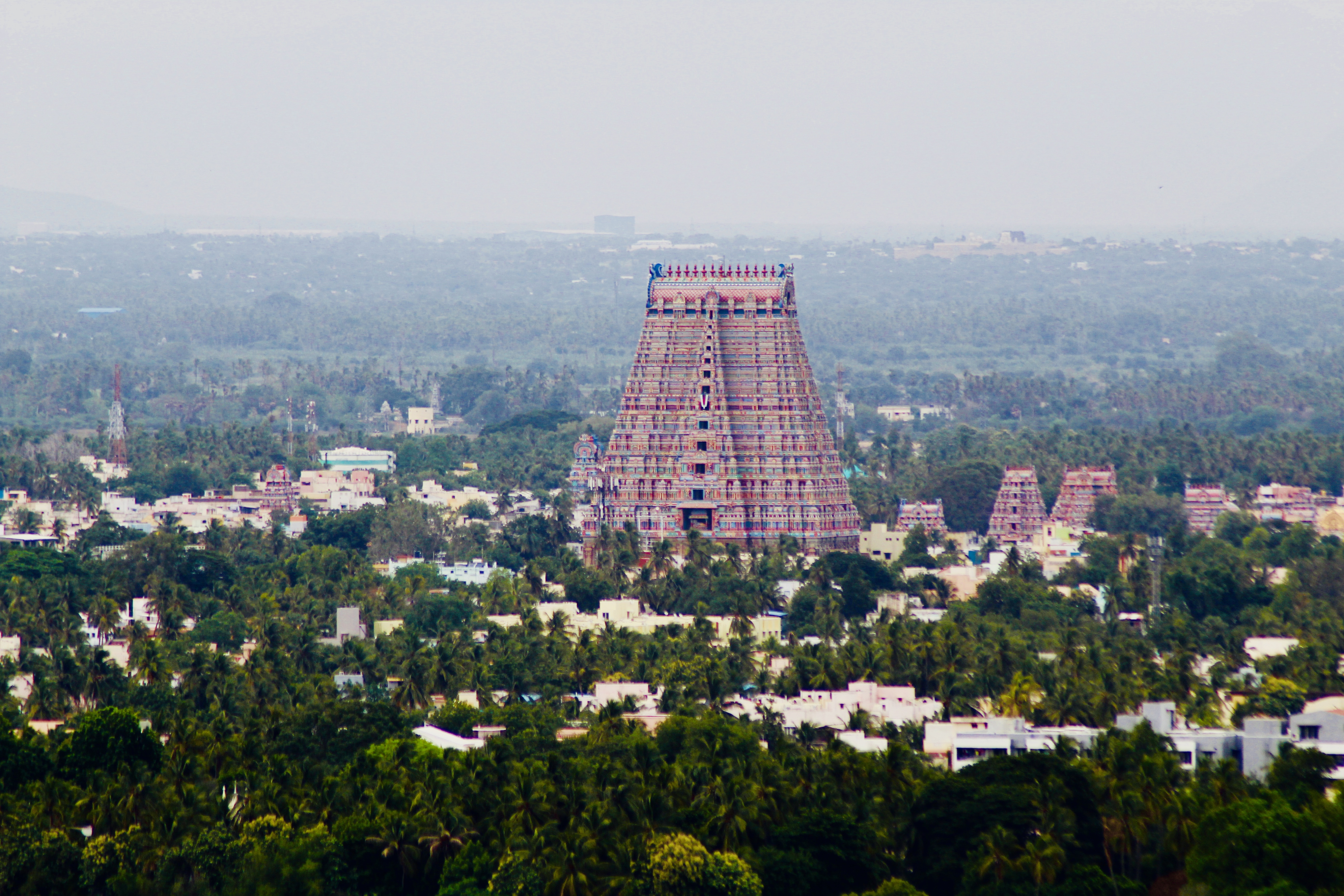
Srirangam Ranganathaswamy Temple, Srirangam

The Cholas who were very active during the Sangam age were entirely absent during the first few centuries. The period started with the rivalry between the Pandyas and the Pallavas, which in turn caused the revival of the Cholas. The Cholas went on to becoming a great power. Their decline saw the brief resurgence of the Pandyas. This period was also that of the re-invigorated Hinduism during which temple building and religious literature were at their best.

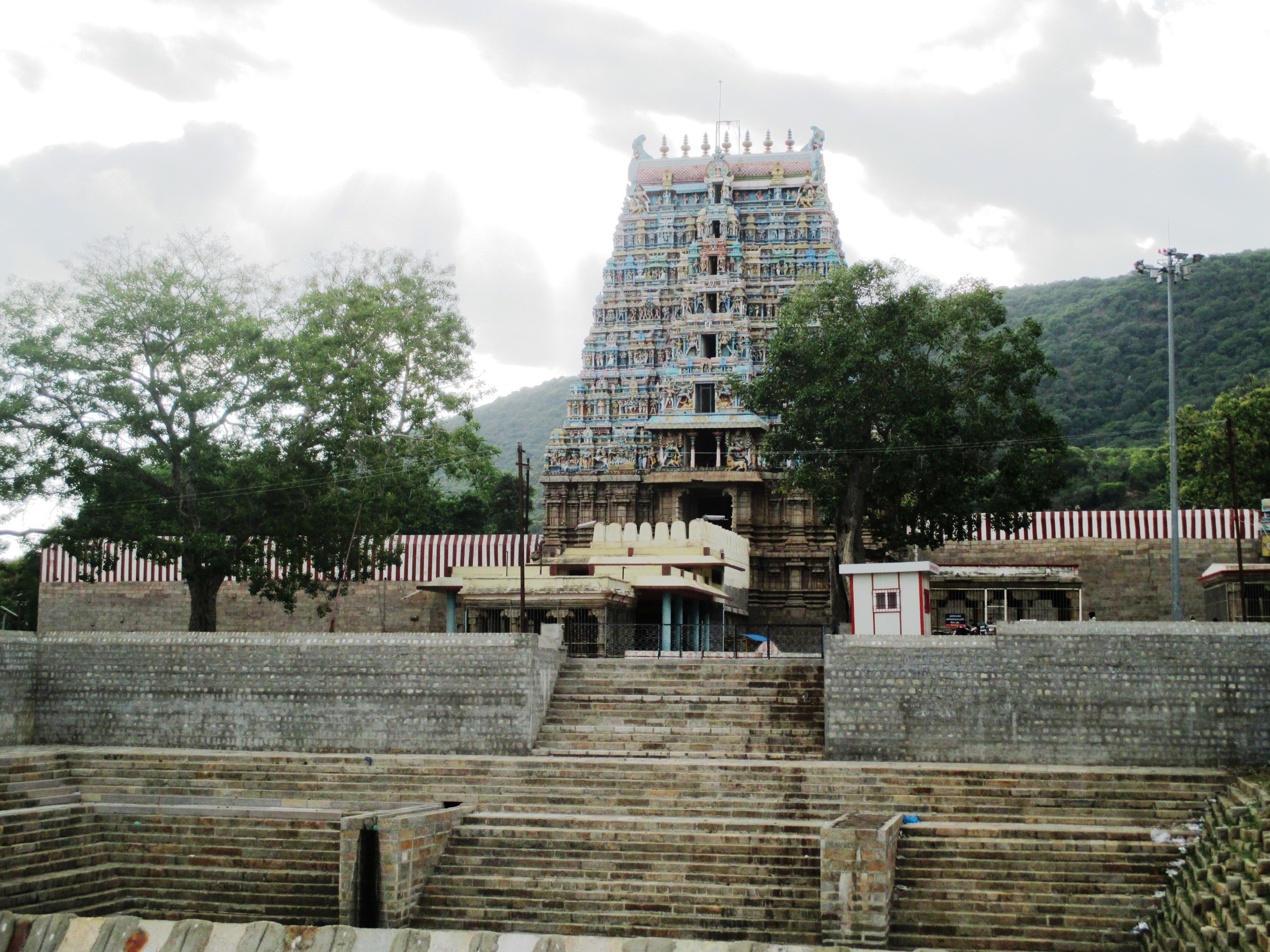
Kallalagar temple in Madurai built by the Pandyans.

The Cheras ruled in southern India from before the Sangam era (300 BCE–250 CE) over the Coimbatore, Karur, Salem Districts in present-day Tamil Nadu and present day Kerala from the capital of Vanchi Muthur in the west, (thought to be modern Karur).

The Kalabhras, invaded and displaced the three Tamil kingdoms and ruled between the 3rd and the 6th centuries CE of the Sangam period. This is referred to as the Dark Age in Tamil history and Hinduism in Tamil Nadu. They were expelled by the Pallavas and the Pandyas in the 6th century. During the Kalabhras' rule, Jainism flourished in the land of the Tamils, and Hinduism was suppressed. Because the Kalabhras gave protection to Jains and perhaps Buddhists, too, some have concluded that they were anti-Hindu, although this latter view is disputed.

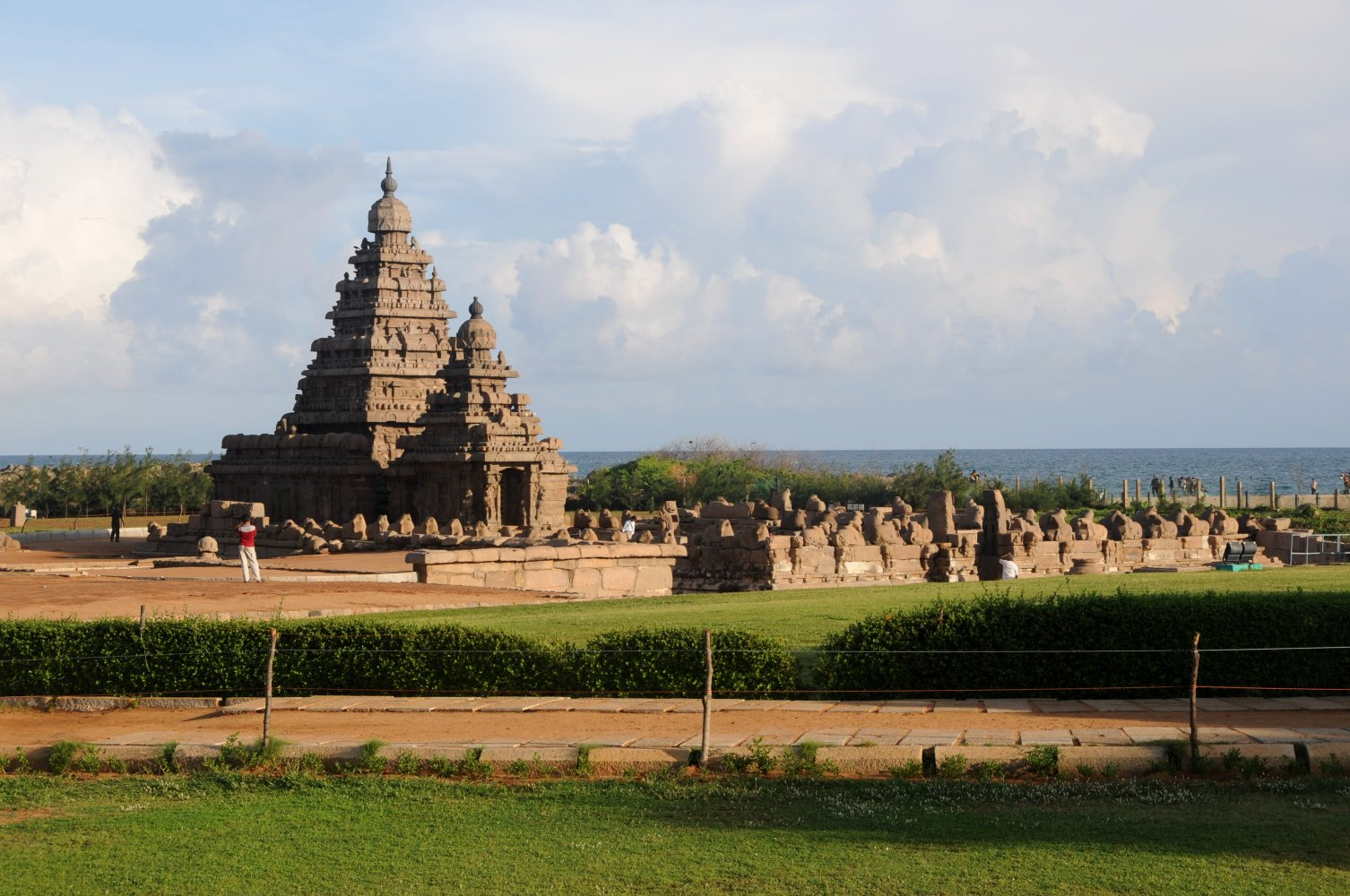
Shore Temple built by the Pallavas at Mamallapuram (c. 8th century CE) – UNESCO World Heritage Site.

During the 4th to 8th centuries CE, Tamil Nadu saw the rise of the Pallavas under Mahendravarman I and his son Mamalla Narasimhavarman I. Pallavas ruled a large portion of South India with Kanchipuram as their capital. Mahendra Varman was principally a Buddhist, but converted to Hinduism by the influence of Shaiva saints. It was under him that Dravidian architecture reached its peak with the Pallava built Hindu temples. Narasimhavarman II built the Shore Temple which is a UNESCO World Heritage Site.

The Pallavas were replaced by the Cholas as the dominant kingdom in the 10th century CE and they in turn were replaced by Pandyas in the 13th century CE with their capital as Madurai. Temples such as the Meenakshi Amman Temple at Madurai and Nellaiappar Temple at Tirunelveli are the best examples of Pandyan temple architecture.

==== Chola Empire ====
By the 9th century CE, during the times of the second Chola monarch Aditya I, his son Parantaka I, Parantaka Chola II itself the Chola empire had expanded into what is now interior Andhra Pradesh and coastal Karnataka, while under the great Rajaraja Chola and his son Rajendra Chola, the Cholas rose as a notable power in south Asia.

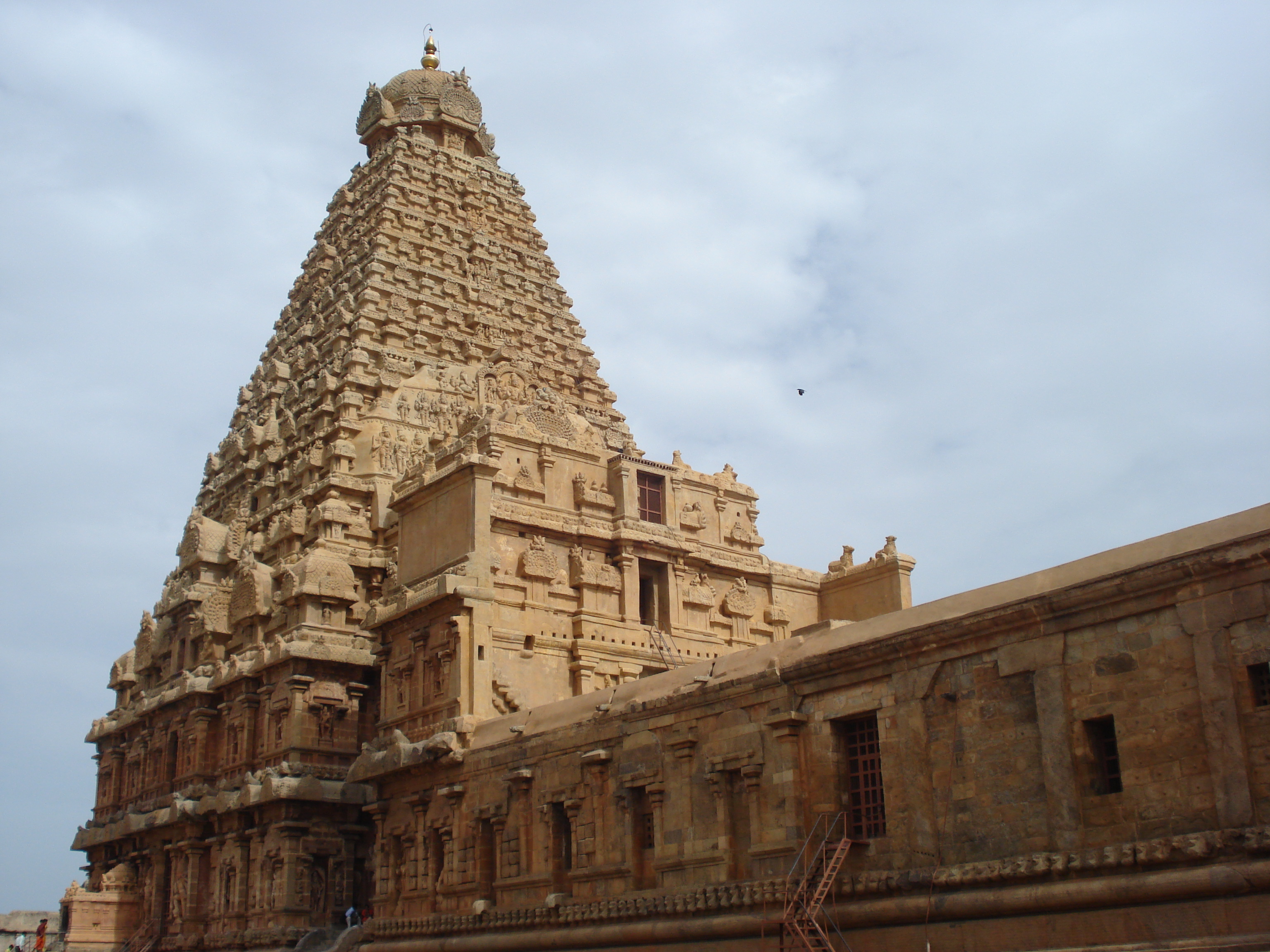
Rajarajeshwaram Udaiyar Tirukkoyil built by Raja Raja Chola I in 1010 CE

The Cholas excelled in building magnificent temples. Brihadeshwara Temple in Thanjavur is a classical example of the magnificent architecture of the Chola kingdom. Brihadshwara temple is an UNESCO Heritage Site under "Great Living Chola Temples." Some examples are Tiruvarur Thyagaraja Swamy temple known as Thirumoolasthanam, Annamalaiyar Temple located at the city of Tiruvannamalai and the Chidambaram Temple in the heart of the temple town of Chidambaram. With the decline of the Cholas between 1230 and 1280 CE, the Pandyas rose to prominence once again, under Maravarman Sundara Pandya and his younger brother, the celebrated Jatavarman Sundara Pandyan. This revival was short-lived as the Pandya capital of Madurai itself was sacked by Alauddin Khalji's troops under General Malik Kafur in 1316 CE.

=== Vijayanagara and Nayak period (1336–1646) ===
The Muslim invasions triggered the establishment of the Hindu Vijayanagara Empire in the Deccan. It eventually conquered the entire Tamil country (c. 1370 CE). This empire lasted for almost two centuries, till the defeat of Vijayanagara in the Battle of Talikota in 1565. Subsequent to this defeat, according to the author Nilakanta Sastri, "many incompetent kings succeeded to the throne of Vijayanagara, with the result that its grip loosened over its feudatories among whom the Nayaks of Madurai and Tanjore, were among the first to declare their independence, despite initially maintaining loose links with the Vijayanagara kingdom". As the Vijayanagara Empire went into decline after mid-16th century, the Nayak governors, who were appointed by the Vijayanagara kingdom to administer various territories of the empire, declared their independence. The Nayaks of Madurai and Nayaks of Thanjavur were most prominent of them all, in the 17th century. They reconstructed some of the oldest temples in the Tamil country, such as the Meenakshi Temple.

=== Modern period ===
==== Rule of Nawabs, Nizams, and British (1692–1947) ====
In the early 18th century, the eastern parts of Tamil Nadu came under the dominions of the Nizam of Hyderabad and the Nawab of the Carnatic. While Wallajah was supported by the English, Chanda Shahib was supported by the French by the middle of the 18th century. In the late 18th century, the western parts of Tamil Nadu, came under the dominions of Hyder Ali and later Tipu Sultan, particularly with their victory in the Second Anglo-Mysore War. After winning the Polygar wars, the East India Company consolidated most of southern India into the Madras Presidency coterminous with the dominions of Nizam of Hyderabad. Pudukkottai remained as a princely state. The Hindu temples were kept intact during this period, and there is no notable destruction recorded.

==== Tamil Nadu in the Republic of India (1947–present) ====
When India became independent in 1947, Madras Presidency became Madras State, comprising present day Tamil Nadu, coastal Andhra Pradesh, South Canara district Karnataka, and parts of Kerala. The state was subsequently split up along linguistic lines. In 1969, Madras State was renamed Tamil Nadu, meaning Tamil country.

The Sripuram Golden Temple in Vellore, completed in 2007.

The total number of Tamil Hindus as per 2011 Indian census is 63,188,168 which forms 87.58% of the total population of Tamil Nadu.

Hindus in Tamil Nadu (2001 census)
Parameter	Population
Total Population	54985079
Literates Population	35011056
Workers Population	25241725
Cultivators Population	4895487
Agricultural Workers Population	8243512
HH Industry Workers Population	1330857
Other Workers Population	10771869
Non-Workers Population	29743354

== Saints ==
The twelve Alvars (saint poets of Vaishnava tradition) and sixty-three Nayanars (saint poets of Shaiva tradition) are regarded as exponents of the bhakti tradition of Hinduism in South India. Most of them came from the Tamil region and the last of them lived in the 9th century CE. Composers of Tevaram – the Tamil saint poets of 7th century namely Appar, Tirugnana Sambandar and Sundarar with the 9th-century poet Manickavasagar, the composer of Tiruvacakam were saints of Shaivism. The Shaiva saints have revered 276 temples in Tevaram and most of them are in Tamil Nadu on both shores of river Cauvery. Vaippu Sthalangal are a set of 276 places having Shiva temples that were mentioned casually in the songs in Tevaram. The child poet, Tirugnana Sambandar was involved in converting many people from Buddhism and Jainism to Hinduism. The saint Appar was involved in Uḻavatru padai, a cleaning and remodification initiative of dilapidated Shiva temples. The Alvars, the 12 Vaishnava saint poets of 7th-9th century composed the Divya Prabandha, a literary work praising god Vishnu in 4000 verses.

The development of Hinduism grew up in the temples and mathas of medieval Tamil Nadu with self-conscious rejection of Jain practises.

== Monastic institutions ==
=== Vaishnava ===
Parakala matha was the first monastery of the Sri Vaishnava sect of Brahmin Hindu society. The matha was first established by Brahmatantra Swatantra Jeeyar, a disciple of Sri Vedanta Desika by 1268 CE. The matha got the name "Parakala" by the grace of Tirumangai Alvar also known as Parakalan. The head of this matha is the hereditary Acharya of the Mysore Royal Family. The Hayagriva idol worshipped here is said to be handed down from Vedanta Desika.

Ahobila Matham (also called Ahobila Matam) is a Vadakalai Sri Vaishnava religious institution established 600 years ago at Ahobilam in India by Athivan Satakopa Svami (originally known as Srinivasacharya). Athivan Sathakopa, a Vadakalai Brahmin, who was a great grand disciple of Vedanta Desikan and a disciple of Brahmatantra Swatantra Jiyar of the Parakala matha, founded and established the matha, based on the Pancharatra tradition. Since then a succession of forty-six ascetics known as Aḻagiya Singar have headed the monastic order.

=== Smartha ===
The Smartha ritualistic form of Hinduism was introduced into the Tamil lands closer to the 5th-6th century CE, it soon became the standard form of Hinduism in the Tamil country and was propagated as such by the different ruling dynasties in Tamil Nadu, the Shaiva and Vaishnava moments started as a result of this introduction. The Kanchi matha serves as the foremost Smartha institution in the state, Kanchi Matha's official history states that it was founded by Adi Sankara of Kaladi, and its history traces back to the fifth century BCE. A related claim is that Adi Sankara came to Kanchipuram, and that he established the Kanchi matha named "Dakshina Moolamnaya Sarvagnya Sri Kanchi Kamakoti Peetam" in a position of supremacy (Sarvagnya Peetha) over the other mathas of the subcontinent, before his death there. Other sources give the place of his death as Kedarnath in the Himalayas.

=== Shaiva ===
Madurai Adheenam is the oldest Shaiva matha in South India established around 600 CE by saint Campantar. It is located two blocks from the huge Madurai Meenakshi Amman Temple, one of the most famous Siva-Shakthi shrines in the world. It is an active centre of Saiva Siddantha philosophy. It is currently headed by Sri Arunagirinatha Gnanasambantha Desika Paramacharya. The adheenam is the hereditary trustee of four temples in Thanjavur District.

Thiruvaduthurai Adheenam is a matha based in the town of Thiruvaduthurai in Kuthalam taluk of Nagapattinam District, Tamil Nadu, India. As of 1987, there were a total of 15 Shiva temples under the control of the adheenam.

Dharmapuram Adheenam is a matha based in the town of Mayiladuthurai, India. As of 1987, there were a total of 27 Shiva temples under the control of the adheenam.

== Deities ==
Hinduism is a diverse system of thought with beliefs spanning monotheism, polytheism, panentheism, pantheism, monism, atheism, agnosticism, gnosticism among others; and its concept of God is complex and depends upon each individual and the tradition and philosophy followed. It is sometimes referred to as henotheistic (i.e., involving devotion to a single god while accepting the existence of others), but any such term is an overgeneralisation.

The major worship forms of Vishnu is worshipped directly, or in the form of his ten avatars, the most famous of whom are Rama and Krishna. Lord Shiva is worshipped directly in the form of lingam with Ganesha, Murugan and Parvathi in separate shrines.

=== Perumal ===
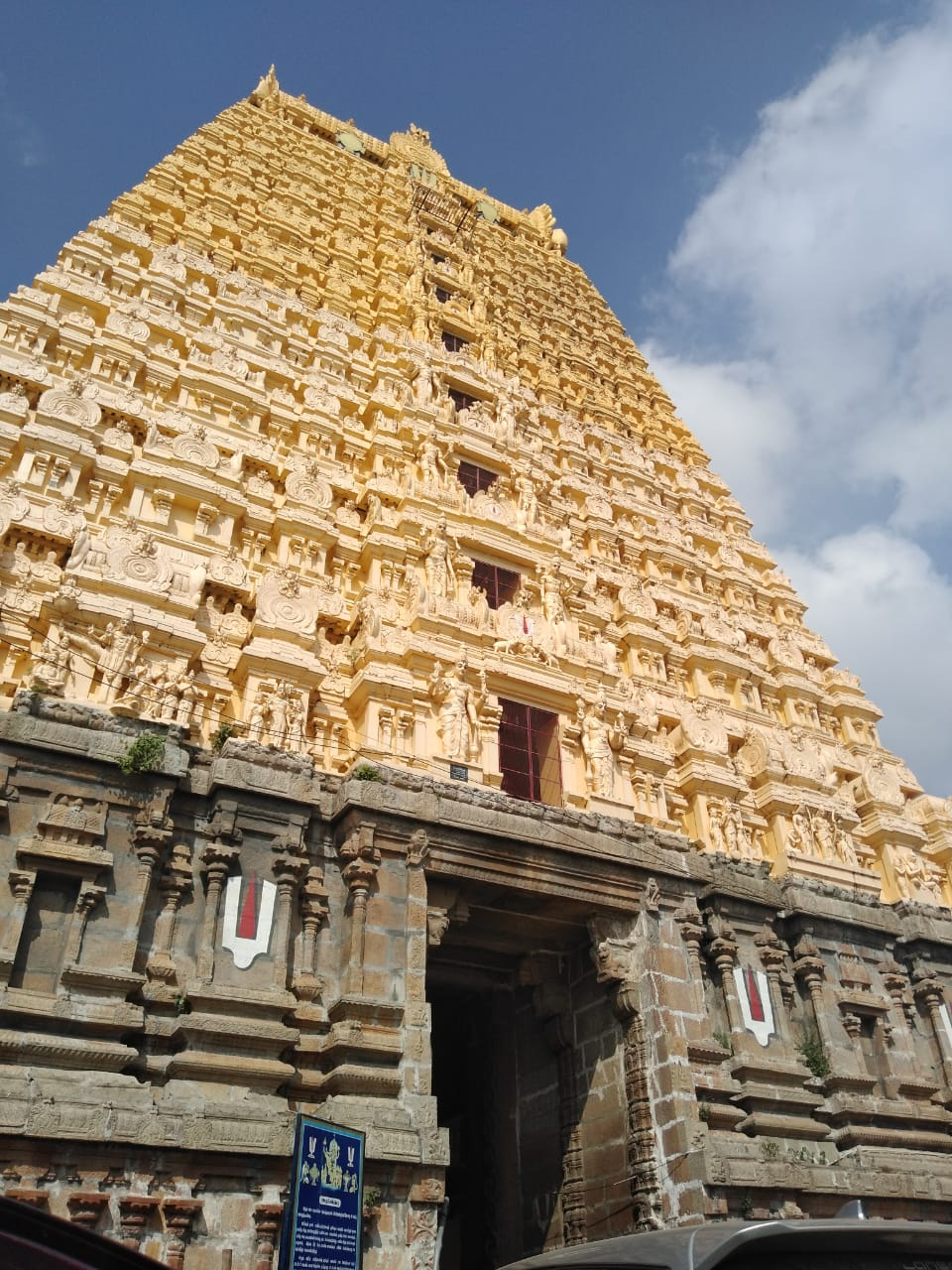
Ulagalantha Perumal Temple

Perumal (Tamil: பெருமாள்), also rendered Thirumal, is a form of Vishnu worshipped in the Sri Vaishnava tradition. He is also venerated by the epithets of Narayana, Varadharaja, Rangaraja, Ranganatha, Kallalagar, Govindaraja, and several others in his temples scattered throughout the Tamil country. Originally venerated as the god of the forests, Perumal was assimilated with Vaishnavism, having earlier conceived been as either a pantheistic or a monotheistic divinity. Through the concept of bhakti, first introduced to the region by the Alvars, Vaishnavism became among the oldest faiths to influence the Tamil people. The deity, and his consort Lakshmi, as well as her aspects of Sridevi, Bhudevi, and Niladevi, are primarily venerated, and are also represented as the Dashavatara in Perumal temples in Tamil Nadu. He is the deity who is primarily addressed in the Naalayira Divya Prabandham, a compilation of works by the Alvar saints, whose philosophy and hymns were propagated in the works of Ramanuja, Manavala Mamunigal, and Vedanta Desikan. The largest Hindu temple in India is dedicated to Perumal in his form of Ranganathaswamy, situated at Srirangam. The Alvars influenced the establishment of the Divya Desams, 108 shrines of Perumal that were glorified in their works, which continue to be visited as major shrines of pilgrimage by Tamil Vaishnavas.

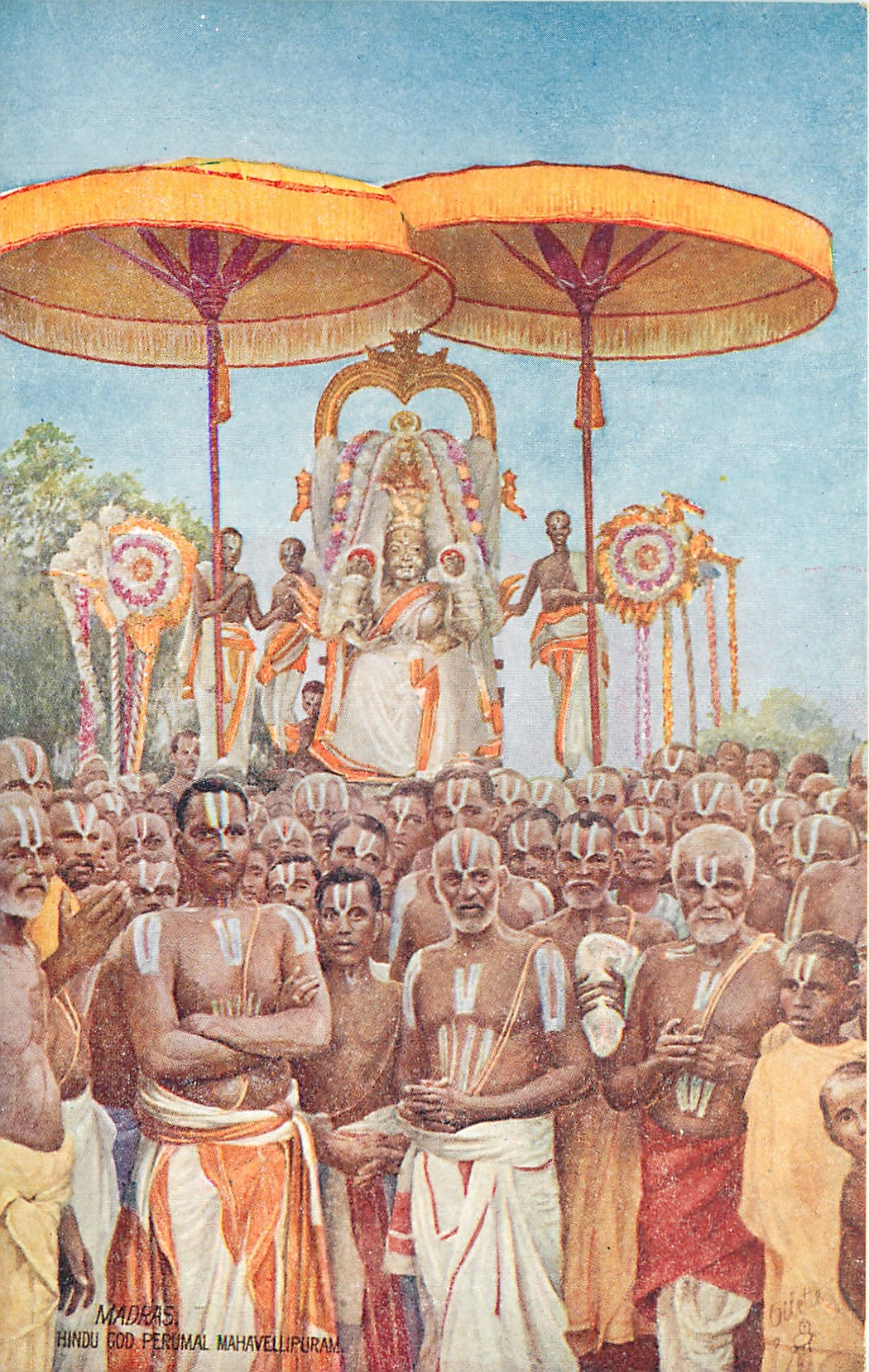
Procession of the Tamil deity Perumal, identified with Vishnu

Number of poems echo the Hindu puranic legends about Parashurama, Rama, Krishna and others in the Akanaṉūṟu . According to Alf Hiltebeitel – an Indian Religions and Sanskrit Epics scholar, the Akanaṉūṟu has the earliest known mentions of some stories such as "Krishna stealing sarees of Gopis" which is found later in north Indian literature, making it probable that some of the ideas from Tamil Hindu scholars inspired the Sanskrit scholars in the north and the Bhagavata Purana, or vice versa. However the text Harivamsa which is complex, containing layers that go back to the 1st or 2nd centuries BCE, Consists the parts of Krishna Playing with Gopis and stealing sarees.

Tamil Sangam literature (200 BCE to 500 CE) mentions Mayon or the "dark one," as the supreme deity who creates, sustains, and destroys the universe and was worshipped in the mountains of Tamilakam. The verses of Paripadal describe the glory of Perumal in the most poetic of terms.

தீயினுள் தெறல் நீ;
பூவினுள் நாற்றம் நீ;
கல்லினுள் மணியும் நீ;
சொல்லினுள் வாய்மை நீ;
அறத்தினுள் அன்பு நீ;
மறத்தினுள் மைந்து நீ;
வேதத்து மறை நீ;
பூதத்து முதலும் நீ;
வெஞ் சுடர் ஒளியும் நீ;
திங்களுள் அளியும் நீ;
அனைத்தும் நீ;
அனைத்தின் உட்பொருளும் நீ;

— Paripadal, iii: 63–68
Translation:

In fire, you are the heat;
in blossoms, the fragrance;
among the stones, you are the diamond;
in speech, truth;
among virtues, you are love;
in valour—strength;
in the Veda, you are the secret;
among elements, the primordial;
in the burning sun, the light;
in moonshine, its sweetness;
you are all,
and you are the substance and meaning of all.

— F Gros, K Zvelebil

=== Narasimha ===
Narasimha (Sanskrit: नरसिंह, lit. 'man-lion', IAST: Narasiṃha), sometimes rendered Narasingha, is the fourth avatar of the Hindu god Vishnu. He is believed to have incarnated in the form of a part-lion, part-man being to kill Hiranyakashipu, to end religious persecution and calamity on earth, thereby restoring dharma. There mentions of Narasimha even in Tamil Sangam Literature and there are Several old Temples for him in Tamil Nadu. The Paripatal (Dated between 300 BCE to 300 CE) (Tamil: பரிபாடல், meaning the paripatal-metre anthology) is a classical Tamil poetic work and traditionally the fifth of the Eight Anthologies (Ettutokai) in Sangam literature. Kamil Zvelebil states that the hymns dedicated to Vishnu and Murugan has branded the Paripatal as a Sanskrit plagiat within the so-called Sangam texts. This Paripadal has a Poem which Praises Vishnu who took the Narasimha Avataram.

Legend of Narasimha according to Paripāṭal

O Lord with faultless red eyes! With
burning hatred in his heart and drying up the
sandal paste on his chest, Hiranyan the evil king
tortured his son Prahalathan for singing your
praises, inflicting on him great sorrow. The young
man was not disrespectful to his father who deserved
disrespect. You embraced Prahalathan’s fine chest
because of your love for him. You attacked and ruined
Hiranyan with great strength, leaping upon his
mountain-like chest as drums roared like thunder.
You tore him apart with your split claws and scattered
his flesh, along with broken pieces of pillar which you
split and came out, in your Narasimhan form.

Paripāṭal, poem 4, Verses 10 - 21

=== Lord Rama ===
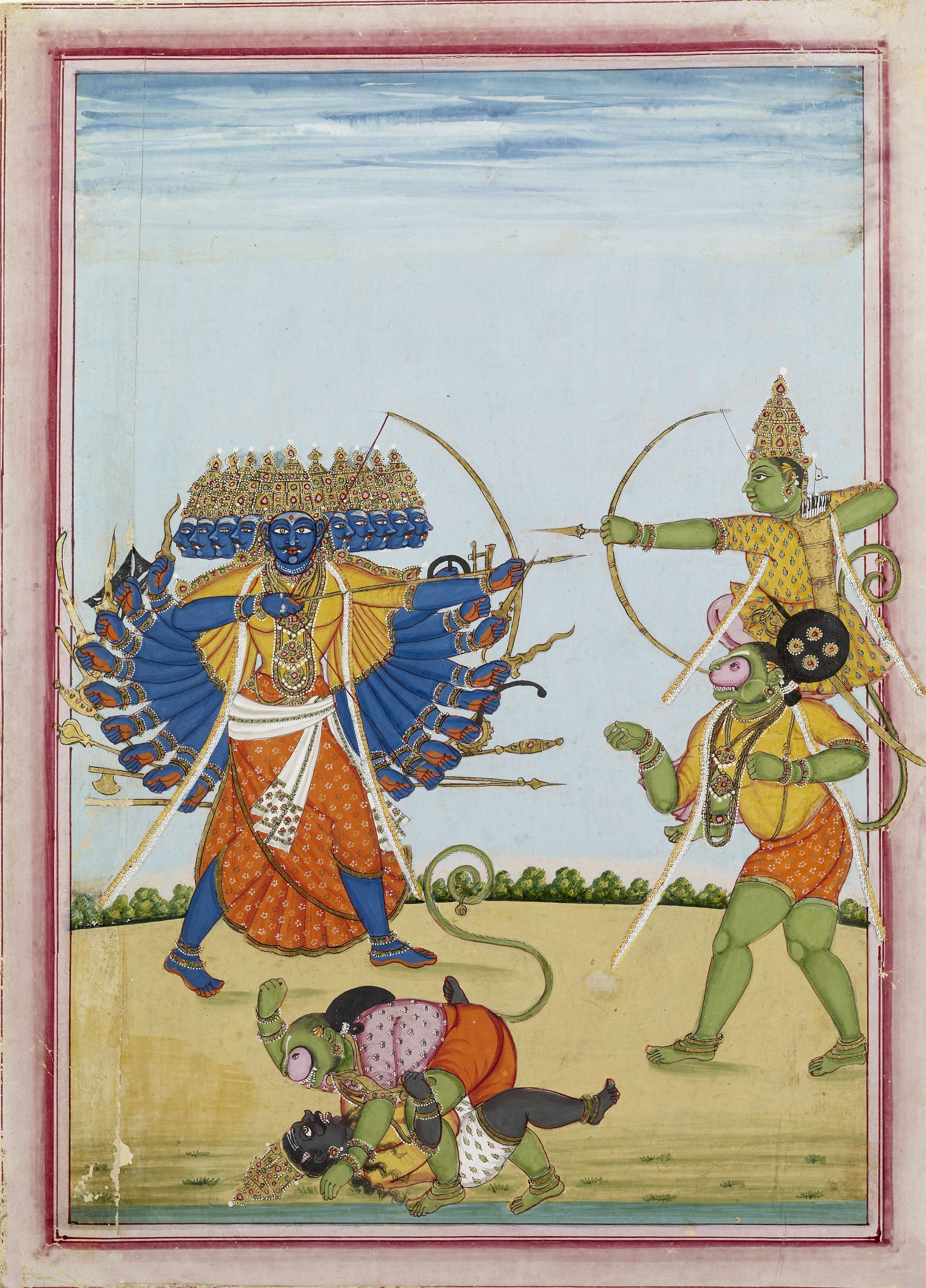
Rama and Hanuman fighting Ravana, an album painting on paper from Tamil Nadu, ca 1820.

Sri Ramachandra also simply called Rama is one of the deities best-known and most widely worshipped in Hinduism, especially Vaishnavism. He is the seventh and one of the most popular avatars of Vishnu. In Rama-centric traditions of Hinduism, he is considered the Supreme Being. The earliest reference to the story of the Ramayana is found in the Sangam literature.

Purananuru which is dated from 1st century BCE and 5th century CE. Purananuru 378, attributed to the poet UnPodiPasunKudaiyar, written in praise of the Chola king IlanCetCenni. The poem makes the analogy of a poet receiving royal gifts and that worn by the relatives of the poet as being unworthy for their status, to the event in the Ramayana, where Sita drops her jewels when abducted by Ravana and these jewels being picked up red-faced monkeys who delightfully wore the ornaments (Hart and Heifetz, 1999, pp. 219–220).

Akanaṉūṟu, which is dated between 1st century BCE and 2nd century CE, has a reference to the Ramayana in poem 70. The poem places a triumphant Rama at Dhanushkodi, sitting under a Banyan tree, involved in some secret discussions, when the birds are chirping away.

The Silappatikaram (translated as The Tale of an anklet) written by a prince turned Jain monk Ilango Adigal, dated to the 2nd century AD or later. The epic narrates the tale of Kovalan, son of a wealthy merchant, his wife Kannagi, and his lover Madhavi, and has many references to the Ramayana story. It describes the fate of Poompuhar suffering the same agony as experienced by Ayodhya when Rama leaves for exile to the forest as instructed by his father (Dikshitar, 1939, p. 193). The Aycciyarkuravai section (canto 27), makes mention of the Lord who could measure the three worlds, going to the forest with his brother, waging a war against Lanka and destroying it with fire (Dikshitar, 1939, p. 237). This seems to imply on Rama being regarded as divinity, rather than a mere human. These references indicate that the author was well aware of the story of the Ramayana in the 2nd century AD.

Manimekalai written as the sequel to the Silappatikaram by the Buddhist poet Chithalai Chathanar, narrates the tale of Manimekalai, the daughter of Kovalan and Madhavi, and her journey to become a Buddhist Bhikkuni. This epic also makes several references to the Ramayana, such as a setu (bridge) being built by monkeys in canto 5, line 37 (however the location is Kanyakumari rather than Dhanushkodi). In another reference, in canto 17, lines 9 to 16, the epic talks about Rama being the incarnate of Trivikrama or Netiyon, and he building the setu with the help of monkeys who hurled huge rocks into the ocean to build the bridge. Further, canto 18, lines 19 to 26, refers to the illegitimate love of Indra for Ahalya the wife of Rishi Gautama(Pandian, 1931, p. 149)(Aiyangar, 1927, p. 28).

=== Pillayar ===
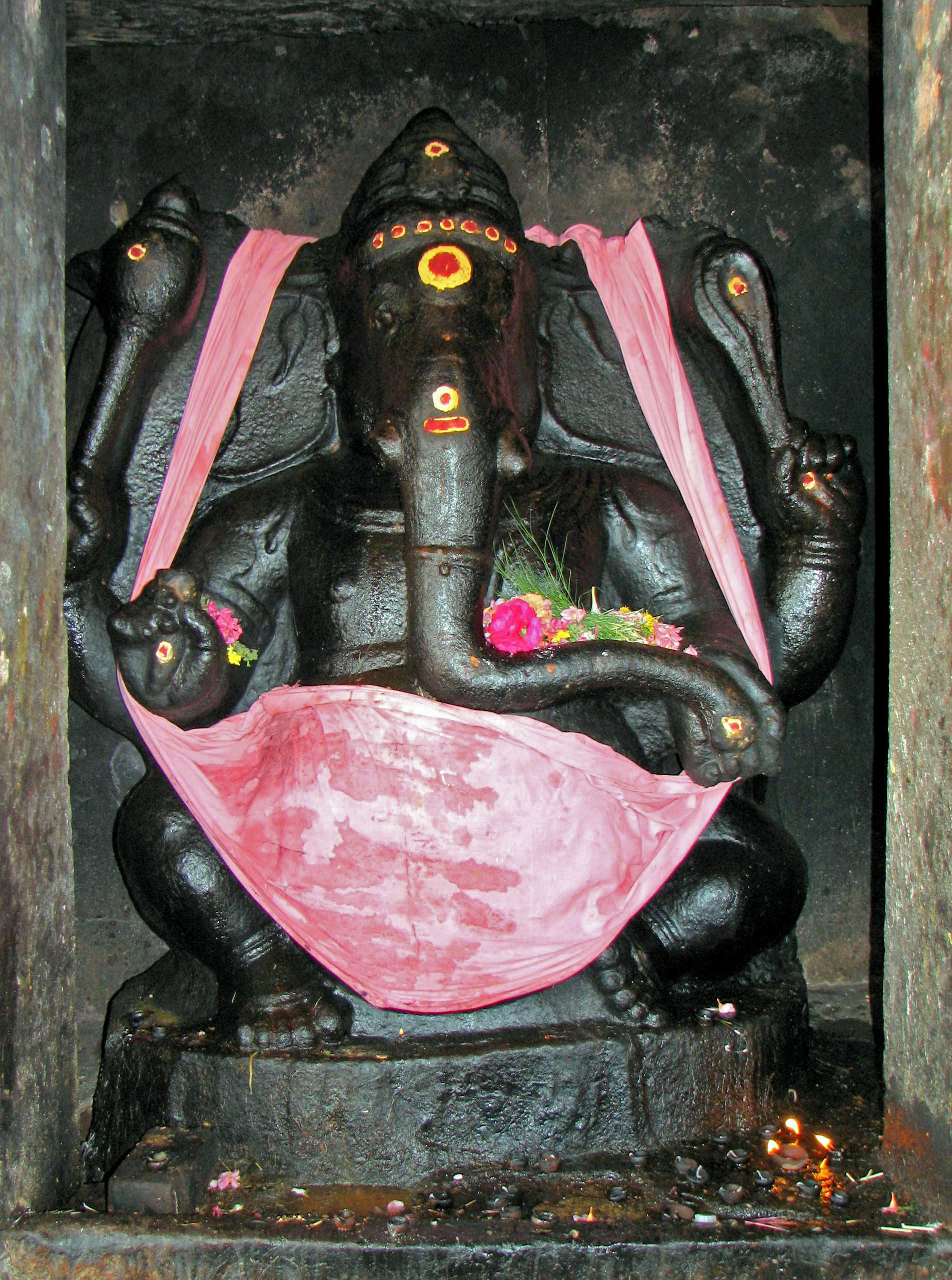
The shrine of Ganesa inside a temple

Ganesha, also spelled Ganesa or Ganesh, also known as Ganapati, Vinayaka, and Pillaiyar (Tamil: பிள்ளையார், lit. 'Piḷḷaiyār'), is one of the deities best-known and most widely worshipped in the Hindu pantheon. Ganesa is the first son of Shiva and is given the primary importance in all Shiva temples with all worship starting from him. Local legend states the Tamil word Pillayar splits into Pillai and yaar meaning who is this son, but scholars believe it is derived from the Sanskrit word pulisara meaning elephant. K. A. Nilakanta Sastri (1963:57-58) thinks that Pallavas adopted the Ganesa motif from Chalukyas. During the 7th century, Vatapi Ganapati idol was brought from Badami (Vatapi - Chalukya capital) by Paranjothi, the general of Pallavas who defeated Chalukyas. In modern times, there are separate temples for Ganesha in Tamil Nadu.

=== Murugan ===
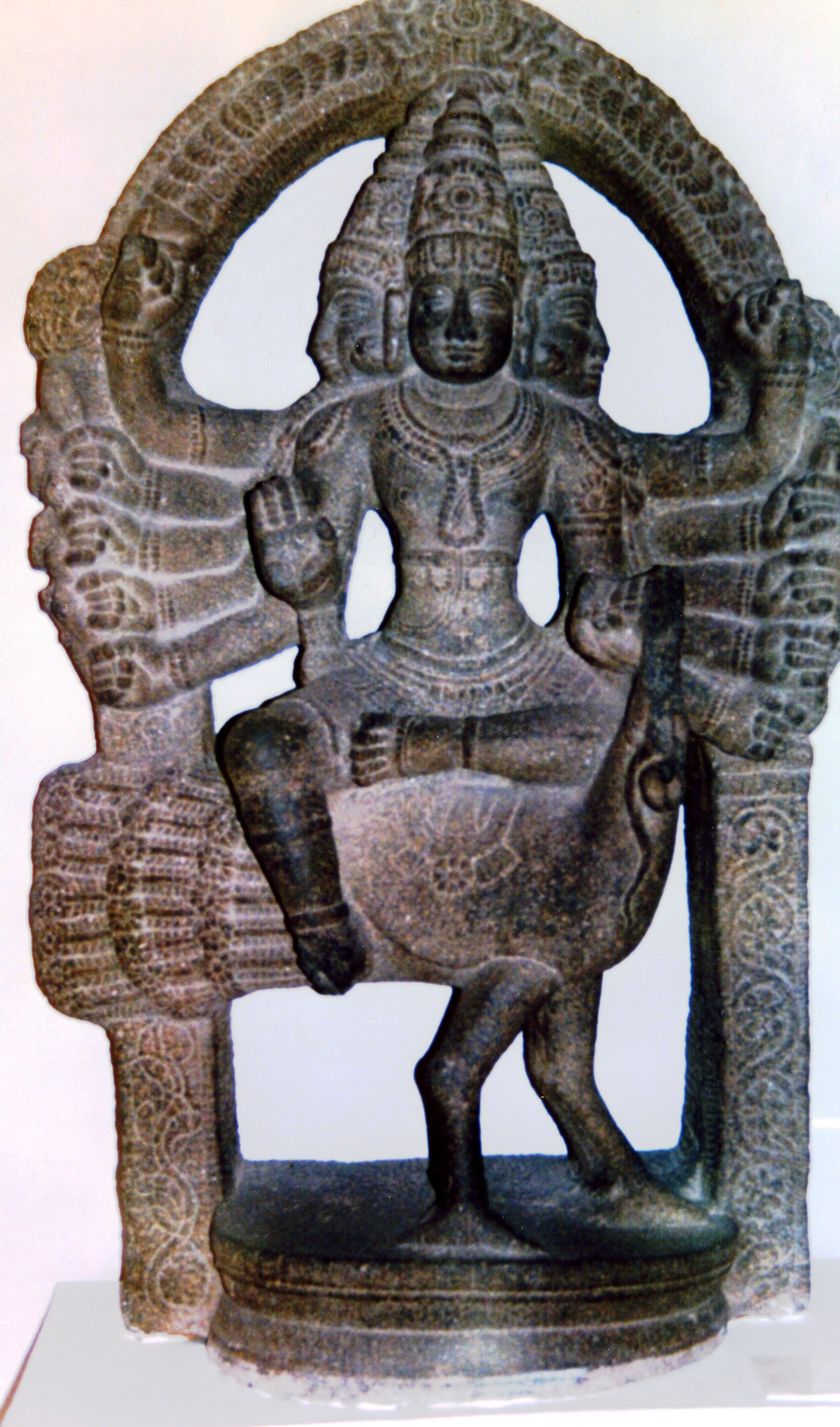
Image of Skanda, the six faced God

Murugan (Tamil: முருகன்) also called Kartikeya, Skanda and Subrahmanya, is a popular deity among the Tamil people, famously referred as Tamil Kadavul (God of Tamils). He is often regarded as the patron deity of the Tamil land (Tamil Nadu). Tolkappiyam, possibly the most ancient of the extant Sangam works, dated between the 3rd century BCE and 5th century CE glorified Murugan, " the red god seated on the blue peacock, who is ever young and resplendent," and " the favoured god of the Tamils." Efforts were made to incorporate Murugan into both Vaishnavism and Shaivism, with the deity regarded as the son-in-law of Vishnu, and the son of Shiva. The Sangam poetry divided space and Tamil land into five allegorical areas and according to the Tirumurugarruppatai (circa 400-450 CE) attributed to the great Sangam poet Nakkiirar, Murugan was the presiding deity of the Kurinci region (hilly area). Tirumurugaruppatai is a deeply devotional poem included in the ten idylls (Pattupattu) of the age of the third Sangam. The cult of Skanda disappeared during the 6th century and was predominantly expanded during late 7th century Pallava period - Somaskanda sculptured panels of the Pallava period stand as a testament.

=== Shiva ===
==== Lingam ====
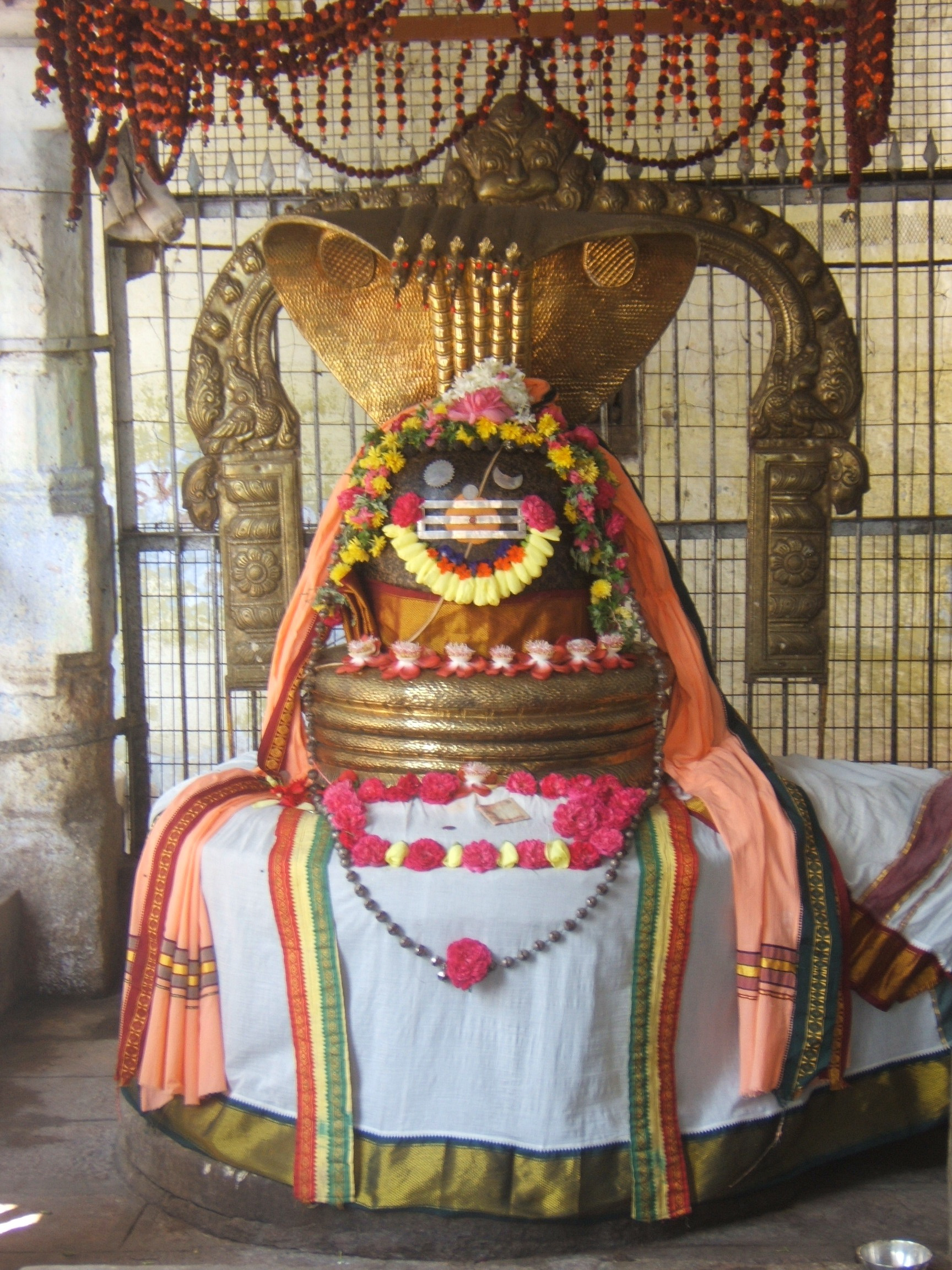
Decorated form of Shiva Lingam

The Lingam is a representation of the Hindu deity Shiva used for worship in Hindu temple. The lingam is the principal deity in most Shiva temples in South India. The propagation of linga worship on a large scale in South India is believed to be from Chola times (late 7th century CE), through Rig veda, the oldest literature details about worshipping Shiva in the form of linga. Pallavas propagated Somaskanda as the principal form of worship, slightly deviating from the Shaiva agamas; Cholas being strict shaivas, established lingams in all the temples.

==== Lingothbhavar ====
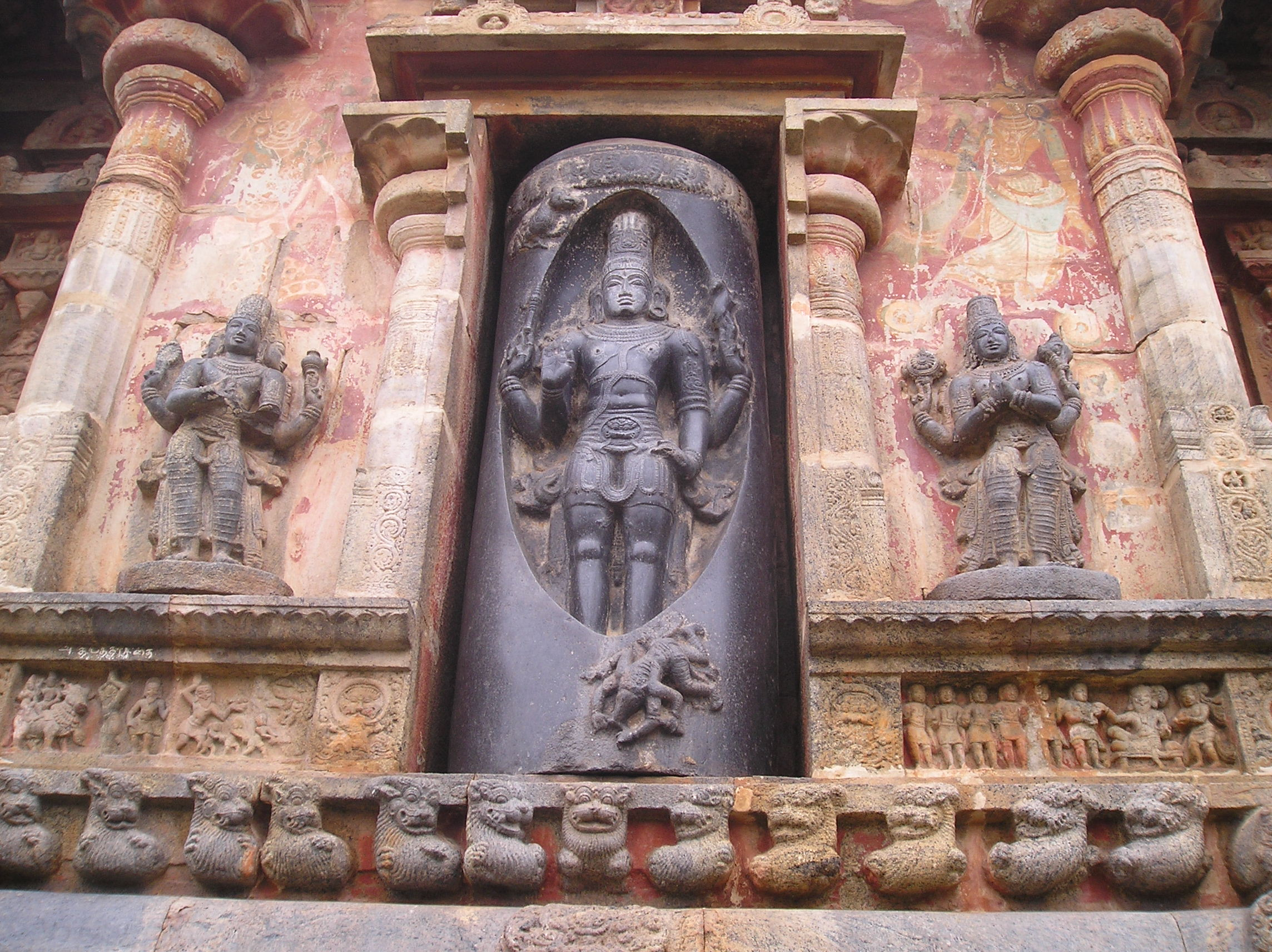
Lingothbhava or emergence of Linga

Lingothbhavar or emergence of linga, found in Shiva Purana as a symbol of Shiva, augments the synthesis of the old cults of pillar and phallic worship. The idea emerged from deity residing in a pillar and later visualised as Shiva emerging from the lingam The lingothbhavar image can be found in the first precinct around the sanctum in the wall exactly behind the image of Shiva. Appar, one of the early Shaiva saint of the 7th century, gives evidence of this knowledge of puranic episodes relating to Lingothbhavar form of Shiva while Tirugnana Sambandar refers this form of Shiva as the nature of light that could not be comprehended by Brahma and Vishnu.

==== Nataraja ====
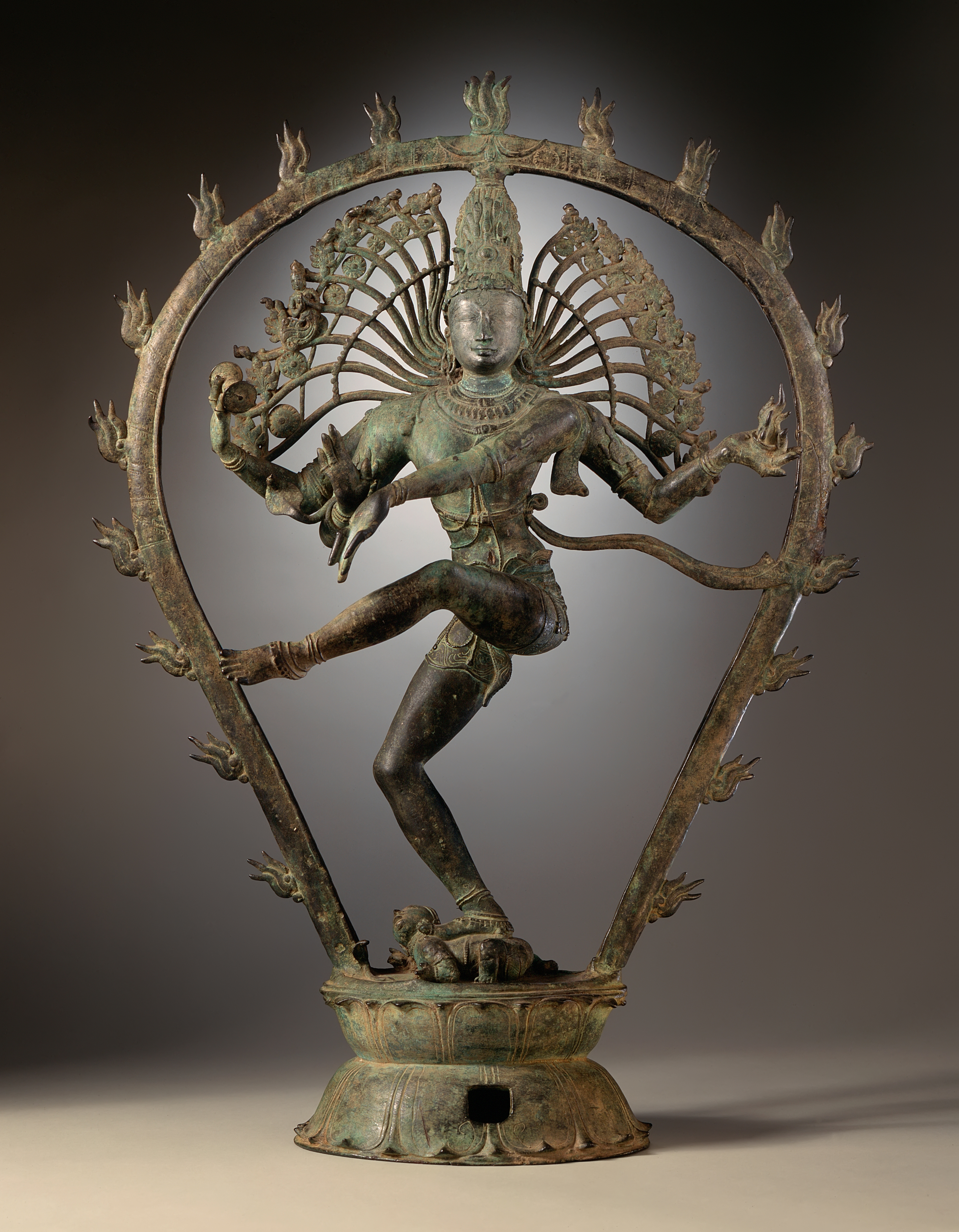
Shiva Nataraja, the Lord of the Dance

Nataraja or Nataraj, The Lord (or King) of Dance; (Tamil: கூத்தன் (Kooththan)) is a depiction of the Hindu god Shiva as the cosmic dancer Koothan who performs his divine dance to destroy a weary universe and make preparations for god Brahma to start the process of creation. A Tamil concept, Shiva was first depicted as Nataraja in the famous Chola bronzes and sculptures of Chidambaram. The dance of Shiva in Tillai, the traditional name for Chidambaram, forms the motif for all the depictions of Shiva as Nataraja. The form is present in most Shiva temples in South India, and is the main deity in the famous temple at Chidambaram.

==== Dakshinamurthy ====
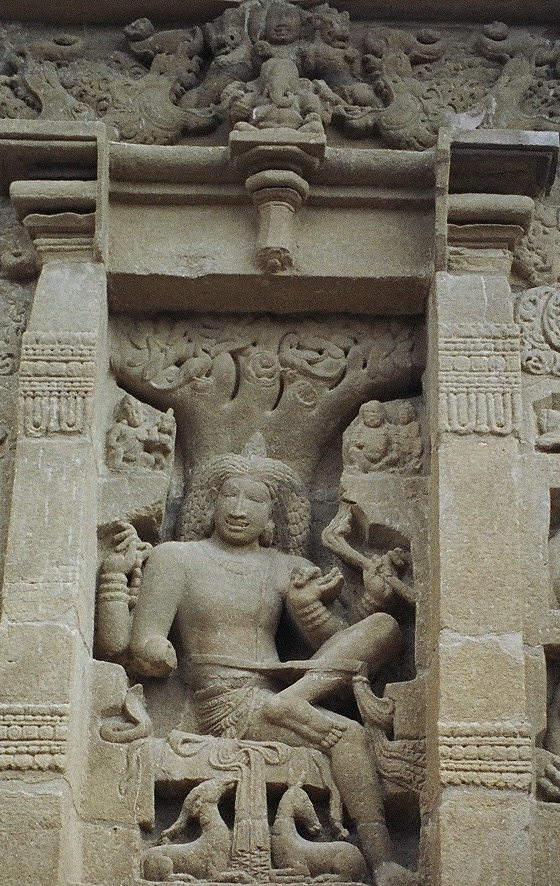
Dakshinamurthy

Dakshinamurthy or Jnana Dakshinamurti (Tamil: தட்சிணாமூர்த்தி, IAST:Dakṣiṇāmūrti) is an aspect of Shiva as a guru (teacher) of all fields. This aspect of Shiva is his personification of the ultimate awareness, understanding and knowledge. The image depicts Shiva as a teacher of yoga, music, and wisdom, and giving exposition on the shastras (vedic texts) to his disciples.

==== Somaskandar ====
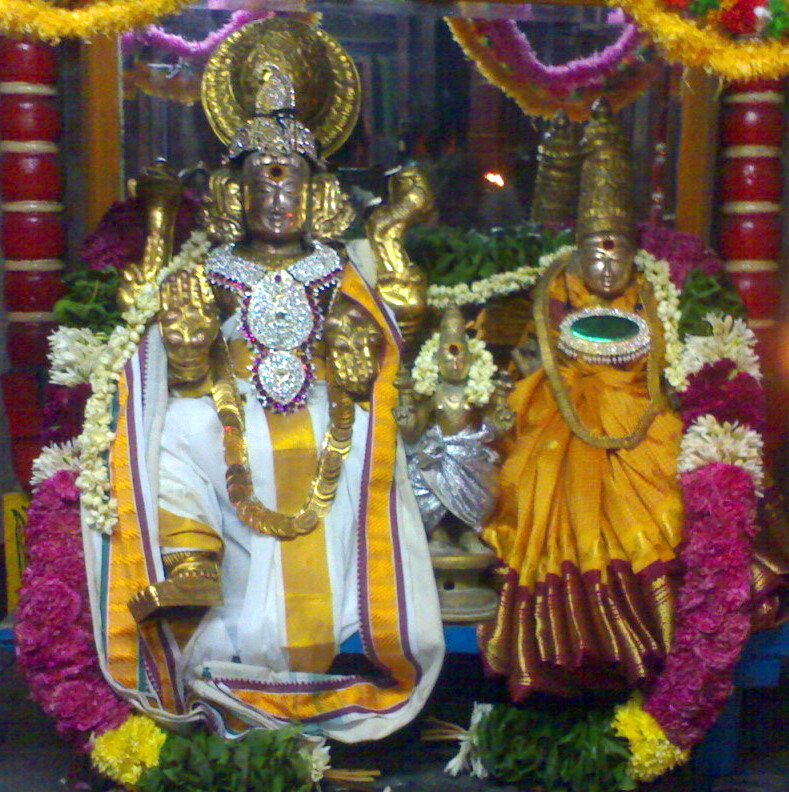
Image of Somaskandar - Shiva accompanied by Skanda the child and Parvathi

Somaskanda derives from Sa (Shiva) with Uma (Parvathi) and Skanda (child Murugan). It is the form of Shiva where he is accompanied by Skanda the child and Paravati his consort in sitting posture. Though it is a Sanskrit name, it is a Tamil concept and Somaskandas are not found in North Indian temples. In the Tiruvarur Thygarajar Temple, the principal deity is Somaskanda under the name of Thyagaraja. All temples in the Thygaraja cult have images of Somaskandar as Thyagarajar - though iconographically similar, they are iconologically different. Architecturally when there are separate shrines dedicated to the utsava(festival deity) of Somaskanda, they are called Thyagaraja shrines. Unlike Nataraja, which is a Chola development, Somaskanda was prominent even during the Pallava period much earlier to Cholas. References to the evolution of the Somaskanda concept are found from Pallava period from the 7th century CE in carved rear stone walls of Pallava temple sanctums. Somaskanda was the principal deity during Pallava period replacing lingam, including the temples at Mahabalipuram, a UNESCO world heritage site. But the cult was not popular and Somaskanda images were relegated to subshrines. Sangam literature does not mention Somaskanda and references in literature are found in the 7th-century Tevaram.

==== Bhairavar ====
Bhairava is one of the eight forms of Shiva, and translation of the adjectival form as "terrible" or "frightful". Bhairava is known as Vairavar in Tamil where he is often presented as a Grama Devata or folk deity who safeguards the devotee on all eight directions. In Chola times Bhairava is referred as Bikshadanar, a mendicant, and the image can be found in most Chola temples.

=== Dravidian folk religion ===
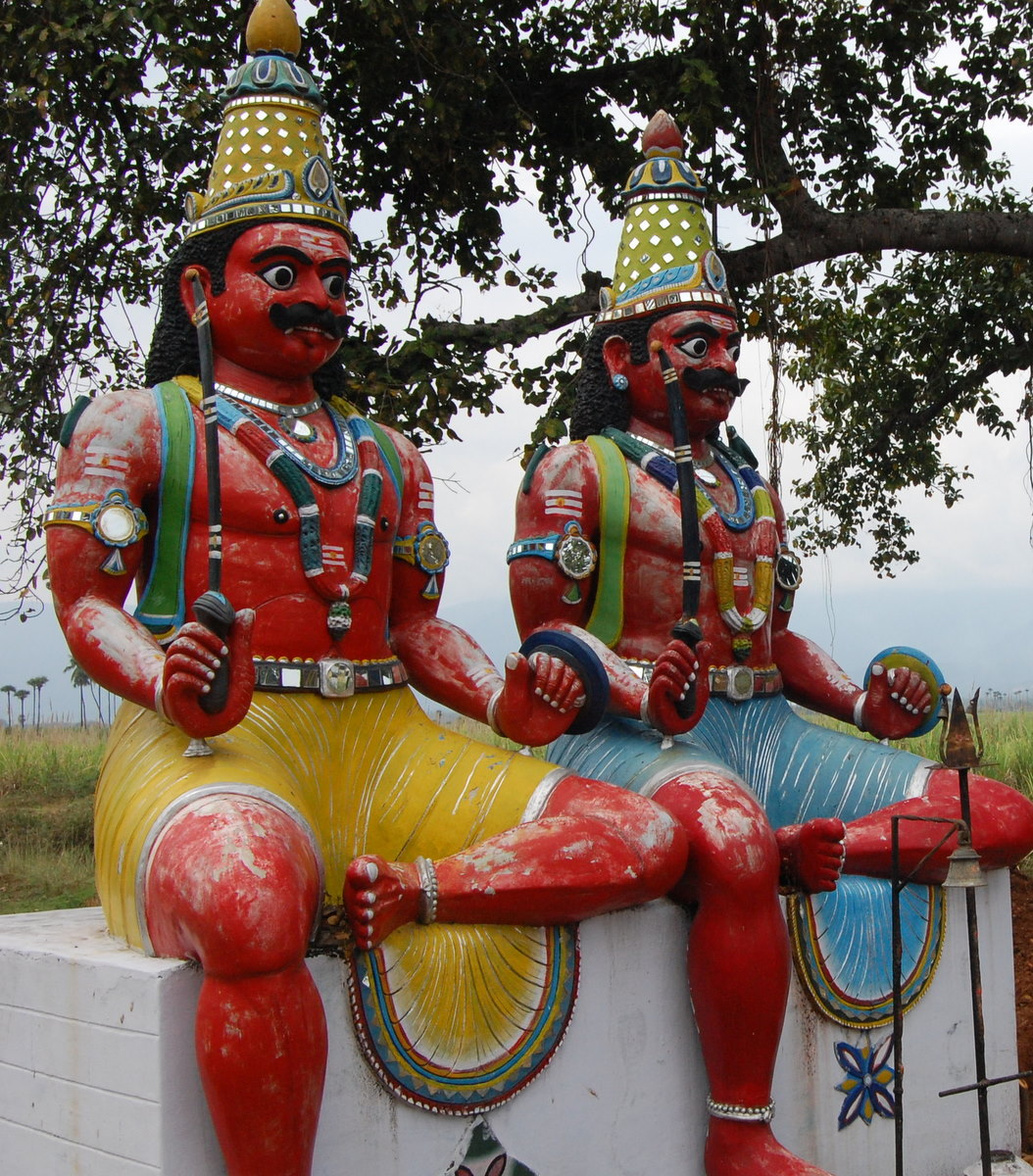
Ayyanar idols near Gobi

- Ayyanar (Tamil: ஐயனார்) is worshipped as a guardian deity predominantly in Tamil Nadu and Tamil villages in Sri Lanka. The earliest reference to Aiynar-Shasta includes two or more hero stones to hunting chiefs from the Arcot district in Tamil Nadu. The hero stones are dated to the 3rd century CE. It reads "Ayanappa; a shrine to Cattan." This is followed by another inscription in Uraiyur near Tiruchirapalli which is dated to the 4th century CE. Literary references to Ayyanar-Cattan is found in Silappatikaram, a Tamil Jain work dated to the 4th to 5th century CE. From the Chola period (9th century CE) onwards the popularity of Ayyanar-Shasta became even more pronounced.
- Madurai Veeran (Tamil: மதுரை வீரன், romanized: Warrior of Madurai, lit. 'Maturai Vīraņ') is a Tamil folk deity popular in southern Tamil Nadu. His name was derived as a result of his association with the southern city of Madurai as a protector of the city.
- Kālī (Tamil: காளி) is the Hindu goddess associated with power, shakti. Kālī is represented as the consort of Shiva, on whose body she is often seen standing. She is associated with many other Hindu goddesses like Durga, Bhadrakali, Sati, Rudrani, Parvati and Chamunda. She is the foremost among the Dasa Mahavidyas, ten fierce Tantric goddesses.
- Muneeswarar (Tamil முனீஸ்வரன்) is a Hindu god. 'Muni' means 'saint' and 'iswara' represents 'Shiva'. He is considered as a form of Shiva, although no scriptural references have been found to validate such claims. He is worshiped as a family deity in most Shaiva families.
- Karuppu Sami (Tamil: கருப்புசாமி) (also called by many other names) is one of the regional Tamil male deities who is popular among the rural social groups of South India, especially Tamil Nadu and small parts of Kerala. He is one of the 21 associate folk-deities of Ayyanar and is hence one of the so-called Kaval Deivams of the Tamils.
- Sudalai Madan or Madan, is a regional Tamil male deity who is popular in South India, particularly Tamil Nadu. He is considered to be the son of Shiva and Parvati. He seems to have originated in some ancestral guardian spirit of the villages or communities in Tamil Nadu, in a similar manner as Ayyanar.

These deities are primarily worshipped by agrarian communities. Unlike the Vedic traditions, these deities generally do not abide in temples, but in shrines in the open. These gods are primarily worshipped through festivals throughout the year, during important occasions like harvest or sowing time. To propitiate these gods, the villagers make sacrifices of meat (usually goats) and arrack, which is then shared among all the village. In addition, the mantras are not restricted to Sanskrit and are performed in Tamil. Worship of these deities is oftentimes seen as the modern continuation of the Dravidian folk religion followed before the Indo-Aryan migration into Indian subcontinent. Similar practices exist among the Kannada and Telugu non-Brahmin castes and Dravidian tribes of Central India.

== Caste ==
A steeply classified class structure existed in Tamil Nadu from around 2000 years because of the correlation in the form of cultivation, population and centralization of political system. These classes in turn are grouped into social groups especially in rural areas. The shape of class system in rural Tamil Nadu has changed dramatically because of land reform acts like 'Green Revolution'. As per 2001 census, there was a total of 11,857,504 people in Scheduled castes (SC) constituting 19% of Tamil Nadu and 7.1% of SC population in India. Leaving 840 in Buddhism and 837 in Sikhism, leaving the remaining 1,18,55,827 in Hinduism. The literacy rate (who can read, write and understand) among these stands at 63.2% which is lower than the 73.5% state level literacy rate.

=== Self-Respect Movement ===
The Self-Respect Movement is a movement with the purported aim of achieving a society where backward castes have equal human rights, and encouraging backward castes to have self-respect in the context of a caste based society that considered them to be a lower end of the hierarchy. It was founded in 1925 by E. V. Ramasamy (called Periyar by supporters) in Tamil Nadu, India. Ramasamy's movement espoused atheism and rationalism, and was a proponent of anti-Brahminism. He also encouraged members of the lower sections of society to convert to Christianity or Islam. He also claimed that Muslims follow the ancient philosophy of the Dravidians. A number of political parties in Tamil Nadu, such as Dravida Munnetra Kazhagam (DMK) and All India Anna Dravida Munnetra Kazhagam (AIADMK) owe their origins to the Self-respect movement, the latter a 1972 breakaway from the DMK. Both parties are populist with a generally social democratic orientation.

=== Caste-based political parties ===
Caste based political parties were not successful during the 1960s to late 80s when the Indian National Congress, Dravida Munnetra Kazhagam and Anna Dravida Munnetra Kazhagam were dominant. Three of the parties emerged prominent - Pattali Makkal Katchi (PMK) among Vanniyar, Puthiya Tamilagam among Devendrar and Viduthalai Chiruthaigal Katchi among Paraiyar polled 12% vote in the 1999 Loksabha elections. After 1931, caste based census was not performed and hence the census data is not available for other castes.

== See also ==
- Religion in Tamil Nadu
- Religion in Sri Lanka
- Tamil calendar
