= Kaichinam Kaichineswarar Temple =

Hindu temple in Tamil Nadu, India

Coordinates: 10.624496°N 79.667664°E

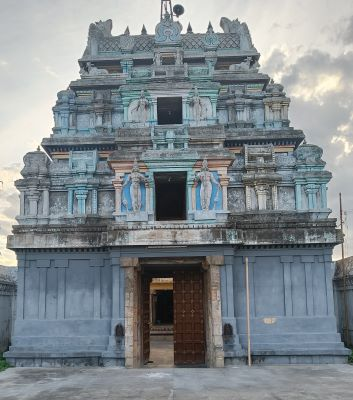
Rajagopura

Kaichinam Kaichineswarar Temple (கைச்சனம் கைச்சினேஸ்வரர் கோயில் ) is a Hindu temple located at Kachanam in Tiruvarur district, Tamil Nadu, India. The historical name of the place is Kaichinam. The temple is dedicated to Shiva, as the moolavar presiding deity, in his manifestation as Kaichineswarar. His consort, Parvati, is known as Palvalai Nayaki.

== Significance ==
It is one of the shrines of the 275 Paadal Petra Sthalams - Shiva Sthalams glorified in the early medieval Tevaram poems by Tamil Saivite Nayanar Tirugnanasambandar.
