= Gandaraditya I =

Gandaraditya (1108 CE – 1138 CE): Bhoja I was succeeded by Gandaraditya. who claimed to be the undisputed king of Konkan. During the later period of his regime, his son Vijayaditya defeated Jayakesin II of Goa who had ousted the Shilahara ruler of Thane. Gandarditya executed various public works. At Irukudi in Miraj district he built a lake called Gandusamudra on the bank of which he built temples in honour of Buddha, Jina and Sankara.
