= Thiruppurambiyam =

Thiruppurambiyam Thirupparambiyam
- village
- Country: India
- State: Tamil Nadu
- District: Thanjavur
- Taluk: Kumbakonam

Population (2001)
  - Total: 5,114

Languages
  - Official: Tamil
- Time zone: UTC+5:30 (IST)

Thirupparambiyam is a village in the Kumbakonam taluk of Thanjavur district, Tamil Nadu, India.

== Demographics ==
In the 2001 census, Thiruppurambiyam had a population of 5114 with 2559 males and 2555 females. The sex ratio was 998. The literacy rate was 67.3

== History ==
Thiruppurambiyam was the fierce battlefield in the 9th century deciding the bright future of Cholas. Chola king, Aditya I built a temple, the Sakshinatheswarar Temple in sweet remembrance of turn of the tide in his favour and named it Aditeshwaram. The present name of the presiding deity is Sakshinathar and the consort's name is Kuraivilla Azhagi (Goddess with unsurpassed beauty). The sanctum of the consort was built by Rajaraja Chola I. The sanctum wall contains beautiful sculptures of Parivara devatas (other deities of Siva temple). Lord Ganesa, the idol of the Elephant God is showered with honey on the day of Vinayagar Chaturthi and all the honey poured down is absorbed by it. The people belonging to this village are the descendants of Cholas. They all are of the same family, but as the centuries passed by, they were divided into separate families. Thiruppurambiyam is a great historical place which then belonged only to Cholas and their families.
