= Early Pandyan society =

Dynasties of ancient Tamil

The Early Pandyas were one of the dynasties that ruled the ancient Tamil country from the pre-Christian era to about 200 AD. The Sangam works such as Mathuraikkanci, Netunalvatai and the Purananuru collection give a lot of information about the life and habits of the people during this age.

== People ==
The Tamil society during the early Pandyan age had several class distinctions among the people, which were different from the Vedic classification of Brahmins, Kshatriyas, Vaishyas and Shudras. The highest class below the king, among the Tamils, was the Arivar or the sages. They were the ascetics that renounced materialism and mostly lived outside the cities. Next in rank were the Ulavar or the farmers. Following the Ulavar were the Poruppan or the armed warriors, then comes Aayar or shepherds, then comes Vedduvar or hunters, followed by artisans such as goldsmiths, blacksmiths etc., then the Valayar or fishermen and finally the Pulayar or the scavengers. The higher classes enjoyed more privileges than the lower classes - for example, when the higher classes passed in the streets, the lower classes made way for them. The Pulayan, for example, bowed in supplication if he met a nobleman. The class distinctions were quite conspicuous in many aspects of life - the dress worn by the people, the way they groomed themselves and the kind of food they subsisted on were all different from one class to another. In spite of such class-based social inequalities, there was no slavery in the society.

There were several occupational groups among the people, like washermen, carpenters, blacksmiths, sculptors, goldsmiths, tailors, jewelers, potters, musicians, priests, oilmongers, wine sellers, prostitutes, actresses and cobblers. Each occupational group lived in its own locality called a Cheri - an arrangement that was made to locate each group without any difficulty, which may have led to the caste system eventually.

== Role of women ==
There was legal and social inequality between the sexes. Women had no property rights, and in general, were subordinate to men. However, women mixed freely in the business and amusements of social life. In towns and cities, women of lower classes were employed as hawkers, vendors, shopkeepers or servants in rich households and in the villages, they worked in the fields and gardens along with men and shared their hardships. The ladies of the higher classes were more confined to their homes, but they were not secluded from society. On festive occasions they joined processions and went out to invite their friends and relations. Owing to the freedom enjoyed by women, it was possible for young people to court each other before marriage. However, the plight of a widow was miserable – they were considered inauspicious and had to live life according to very strict rules. They were prohibited from decorating themselves or participating in any form of amusement. The practice of Sati was also prevalent in ancient Tamil country and was known as tippaydal. When the Pandyan king Pudappandiyan died, his queen Perungopendu killed herself by ascending the funeral pyre of the king. Women were exposed to education, a fact testified by the presence of at least thirty women poets in the Sangam works, including Avvaiyar, Mudatamakkanniar, Kaakkaippaadiniyaar, Naachchellayaar, Naagaiyaar, Nanmullaiyaar, Ponmudiyaar, Ilaveyiniyaar and Nappasaliyaar.

== Clothing ==
A variety of clothing was used by people during this age, including those made of pure cotton and silk. People living in hilly and deserted areas wore dresses made of foliage and flowers. Sheaths of grassy weeds (Korai) were used for making dress by the hill and forest area people. Skins of animals and barks of trees were also used. Men of the poorer classes wore only one piece of cloth around the waist. Among the higher classes, men wore two pieces: one around the waist and the other, the upper cloth, thrown over the shoulders. Both men and women sported long tresses of hair. Women plaited their hair while they were unmarried and after marriage, decorated their hair in five different ways – Kulal, Alagam, Kondai (elderly women tying up their hair), Paniccai (dressing hair in shape of plantain flower) and Tuncai. Widows were not permitted to have tresses of hair. Women also applied a cream of scented clay on their hair for the fragrance and the cooling effect. Women, except widows, wore colorful tilakam on their foreheads and used collyrium to beautify their eyelashes and brows.

== Diet ==
The diet was plain, rice being the staple cereal, with maize, millet, milk, butter and honey being in common use. The Paratavar (fisherman) ate fish as their main food, whereas people in the Mullai regions used dairy products heavily. Kurinji people ate meat obtained by hunting. Rice flakes were eaten with milk, honey, ghee and jaggery. pepper, tamarind and salt were used during cooking. Ghee was used by rich people. Vegetables and fruits were part of their meals. Meat eating was common - people ate flesh of rams, deer, hare, fowl, porcupines, pigs and boar, fresh and dried fish.

== Housing ==
The kind of housing was determined by the type of geography of the land and the economic status of the occupants. The Mullai and Marutam people lived in comfortable and bigger houses compared to that of the Kurinji and Neital people who lived in huts since they had to live near hilly regions and the seashore respectively. The rich built their houses with tiled roofs and walls made of burnt bricks and mud, while the poor built their huts with mud and thatched it with grass, coconut leaves or palmyra palm leaves. Both in the huts and houses, the flooring was smeared with cowdung. The affluent had houses with porticoes, many storeys, open terraces and furnished their houses well. The inner walls of their houses were decorated with flowers and paintings, with cottages to protect them from the wind. Cots were in common use – the rich had luxurious beds decked with swan's feathers and flowers, while the common people had beds woven with the straw of maize and the poorest people used beds made of grass or hay.

== Ancient Madurai ==
The Sangam poems Mathuraikkanci and Netunalvatai give a vivid description of the city of Madurai and the king's palace, under the rule of the Early Pandyas. The main streets were long and broad, with most buildings on either side of them being lofty mansions with upper stories furnished with many windows. A flag was hoisted at every temple and after each victory of the king, gorgeous colors were unfurled in the temples, giving the city a festive look. When the troops returned from successful missions, they brought with them war booty such as elephants, horses, cattle and beautifully carved fortress gates. Feudatory chiefs followed with their tributes to the king, while conch shells were blown to warn pedestrians off the road. The king's palace was built lavishly, surrounded by spacious lawns and enclosed within high walls. The gateways to the palace were massive, rivetted with iron and provided with large bolts and bars. The king ran his business seated from an audience hall in the presence of his council of ministers, military chiefs and other officers.

The Sangam poems also give a detailed account of the day-to-day routine of the inhabitants of Madurai during this period: Long before dawn, musicians tuned their lutes and practiced upon them, pastry cooks cleaned the floors of their shops and toddy sellers opened their taverns for early customers. Minstrels went around singing their morning blessings. At sunrise, conch shells boomed and big drums resounded in temples, monasteries and the palace of the king. Flower-sellers and vendors of fragrant powders, areca nuts and betel leaves strolled the streets. Elderly women with tempting dainties and sweet smelling flowers went from door to door offering the articles for sale. The wealthy classes drove in chariots pulled by horses or rode on ambling steeds which were trained to special paces. In the great market, which was held in an extensive square, several articles were put up for sale such as garlands of flowers, fragrant pastes, coats with metallic belts, leather sandals, weapons, shields, carts, chariots and ornamented chariot steps. The garment shops sold clothing of various colors and patterns, made of cotton, silk or wool and were neatly arranged in rows. In the grain merchants' street, sacks of pepper and sixteen kinds of grains including paddy, millet, gram, peas and sesame seeds were heaped along the street. The jewellers, who conducted business from a separate street, sold precious articles such as diamonds, pearls, emeralds, rubies, sapphires, topaz, coral beads and varieties of gold. In the cool hours of the evening, the nobleman drove out on their chariots accompanied by attendants clad in red garments, who ran by the side of the chariots. The ladies appeared on the high terraces of their mansions, wearing ankle rings and golden bracelets with the fragrances from their perfumes spreading through the streets. The merchants of perishable articles move about the streets disposing of unsold merchandise. Hotels and restaurants are crowded with visitors who feast upon the meals served. A flourish of music from trumpets and other instruments summoned people to the evening worship, following which families proceeded to their places of worship to offer prayers. As the sun set, lamps were lit in each house. Youths, drunken soldiers and harlots decked with jewels and flowers started walking the streets. During festival season, processions of the deities were common, accompanied by dancing and loud music. By nightfall, petty traders closed up their shops and some of them went to sleep outside their stalls. Night guards started patrolling the streets, with bows and arrows, even during dark and rainy nights.
