= Early Pandyan government =

The Early Pandyas were one of the dynasties that ruled the ancient Tamil country from the pre-Christian era to about 200 CE. Most of the information about the administration and government under the early Pandyas comes to use through Sangam literature.

== The king and his court ==
The head of the government was the king, a hereditary monarch, who ruled with unaided discretion. The ascension to the throne was normally hereditary, sometimes through usurpation and occasionally based on unusual methods of choosing a king such as sending out the royal elephant to select a person of its choice by garlanding them. The king could be crowned at any age and reigned as long as he chose to or lived. He was highly revered by his subjects and was even equated to God. The king, in turn, had onerous duties towards his subjects and was held responsible for any misfortune that befell them. The dynastic emblem of the Pandyas was the double carp, which was used for all official purposes of royal authentication. Coins issued by the kings, seals on letters as well as exported and imported cargo stocked in the ware houses at ports bore this emblem.

The king's court consisted of royal officers like the ministers, generals, commanders and accountants. His power was restricted by the Aimberunguzhu (Tamil: ஐம்பெருங்குழு) or the Five Great Assemblies. They consisted of the representatives of the people, priests, physicians, astrologers and the ministers. The council of representatives (Maasanam, Tamil: மாசனம்) safeguarded the rights and privileges of the people; the priests (Paarpar, Tamil: பார்ப்பார்) directed all religious ceremonies; the physicians (Maruthar, Tamil: மருத்தர்) attended to all matters affecting the health of the king and his subjects; the astrologers (Nimithar, Tamil: நிமித்தர்) fixed auspicious times for public ceremonies and predicted important events; the ministers (Amaichar, Tamil: அமைச்சர்) attended to the collection of revenue and expenditure and also the administration of justice. There was another assembly of officials that served the king called the Enberaayam (Tamil: எண்பேராயம்) or the Eight Groups of Attendants. While some scholars believe it consisted of attendants on the king's person like the perfumers, dressing valets, etc., others believe it consisted of more important persons like the people of the capital city, the leaders of the elephant corps and of the cavalry. The principal officers of State were the high priest, the chief astrologer, the ministers and the commanders of the army.

== Administration ==
The king divided his territory into a number of administrative units, each called a Koorram (Tamil: கூற்றம்). It was further divided into provinces called Mandalam, which in turn was divided into many sub-provinces called Nadus, with each Nadu consisting of many villages. A locality inside a town or village was called Ur and each neighborhood inside an Ur was called a Cheri. While the king ruled over his entire territory from the capital, he often placed one or more principalities (Koorram) under the near-sovereign government of some senior member of the royal family or a feudatory. The Cilappatikaram mentions that while Nedunj Cheliyan I ruled from Madurai, his younger brother was placed in charge of the Korkai principality. The villages that come under a principality, were each governed by the elders in the respective villages, almost autonomously. This arrangement can be roughly equated to a central government (the king), under which operated a set of feudal governments (the principalities), which in turn oversaw the local governments (the villages).

Madurai, the capital city from which the king ran the central government, was large, populous and prosperous. It had a simple police and sanitation system wherein the watchmen walked the streets, lamp in hand. The streets were kept clean by fresh sand being laid, thereon. Separate cheris existed for different sections of the society like the priests, merchants etc. Hospitals and educational institutions were set up by royal order or the philanthropy of the wealthy.

The village was the most fundamental unit of administration under the Pandyas. The affairs of a village were the responsibility of its elders, who were not elected but were recognized and appointed based on their age and status in society. There were two institutions for managing the affairs of a village – Ambalam and Manram, the only difference between the two being the locations from which they operated. The Manram or Podiyil was a simple structure around the foot of a tree in the centre of the village, while the Ambalam or Avai was a small building on a slightly raised platform. The functions of these institutions were judicial, administrative and financial – they looked after the police duties, hearing and settling disputes, justice, sanitation, communicating royal orders, land surveys, revenue assessment and maintenance of roads and irrigation facilities. Only the transmission of locally collected taxes to the royal coffers was left to the king's revenue officers.

== Judicial system ==
Justice was administered free of charge, by special officers appointed as judges and magistrates, but the king was supreme and the final arbiter in all civil and criminal cases. The monarchs prided themselves on the justness of their government. The Cilapatikaram mentions a Pandyan king who died of remorse on realizing his guilt of injustice. The officers appointed as judges were expected to be learned, straightforward, experienced and aged. Mortgage, lease, trust property, loans, breach of contract were some common sources of civil litigation, which had no time bar. Theft, adultery, forgery and treason were some types of criminal offences.

In the capital city, dispensation of justice was organized by the king in his own court, while in the villages, it was the elders that meted out justice. The committees of justice in the village assemblies were the Nyayattars and they met under ceremonial trees to conduct the trial and pronounce judgements. Trials were mostly characterized by elaborate judicial procedure, setting down of evidence and judgement. However, there have been instances where the trial-by-ordeal system was practiced, in which the defendant was put through some form of torture and if he escaped unscathed, he was deemed innocent.

The punishments were very severe and hence crimes were rare: one caught in the act of burglary, adultery or spying was given the death penalty and one giving false testimony would have his tongue cut off. Prisons were used to hold not only the guilty but also captives taken in war. Prisoners were chained and were watched over by warders. It was common practice to release prisoners on festive occasions and in some cases, they were asked to go into sea for pearl-fishing.

== Military and warfare ==
The king was the chief commander of the army and usually led his army in the battlefield. The military was said to be fourfold : the infantry, the cavalry, the elephantry and the chariotry. A wide variety of war weapons filled the military arsenal including shields, swords, spears, tridents, maces, bows and arrows. A successful war could lead to annexation of territories or the submission of the enemy, who would then recognize the hegemony of the victor and start paying tributes.

Battles of this age were of two kinds – those fought in the open and those fought around a fort under siege. The Maduraikanci gives a vivid picture of the sophisticated defence mechanism that was in place to protect the fort of Madurai during siege warfare. There were four gates to the fort surmounted by high towers, with massive walls built of rough-hewn stone. Surrounding the fort on its outside was a deep moat and around the moat was a thick jungle of thorny trees. The roads leading to the gates of the fort were wide enough to permit several elephants to pass abreast. There were all kinds of weapons and missiles concealed on the walls on both the sides of the entrance, ready to be discharged on an enemy. Many curious engines were mounted on the battlements to shoot arrows or to fling stones on those that besiege them. There were machines like the fishing rod and angle to catch and drag up those that approach the wall and machines like iron fingers to seize and tear them to pieces. There were also furnaces from which hot oil and molten metal might be poured on those that attempt to scale the wall and iron spokes and spears to shove down those that might succeed in mounting the ramparts. While besieging a fort, the method adopted by the invading army was to first cut open a wide passage through the jungle around the fort, then fill up the moat to enable the army to approach the walls and finally scale the wall with ladders or break open the gates with the help of elephants trained to do the work.

When the battle lines were drawn up, the elephants were placed first, the chariots and cavalry were ranged behind them and the infantry occupied the rear. The chariots and elephants carried the royalty and the generals that led the army and were armed with lances or swords and shields adorned with gold. The infantry consisted of archers and lancers who also carried swords and large bucklers. The cavalry carried lighter arms than the infantry. Since the elephants always formed the most formidable part of an army, it was deemed a great feat of valour to kill an enemy elephant.

== Revenue and expenditure ==
The main sources of royal revenue were taxes, tributes, customs duties and tolls. Taxes were called Karai or Irai, tributes called Tirai and customs tolls and duties were called Sungam. Levy of taxes as well as expenditure was at the discretion of the king who decided the rate and incidence of taxes, as well as any remissions. Land tax, paid in money or in kind, and income tax, equal to one-sixth of an individual's income, were the major types of taxes collected. Other sources of revenue include tributes paid by feudal subordinates, war booty presents by loyal and visiting subjects, treasure troves besides land revenue, cess and forced gifts. Tolls were collected on the trunk-roads used by caravans and at the frontier of each kingdom. Customs were levied at seaports where the imported goods landed. The export of locally manufactured goods such as textiles, pearls etc. earned a lot of foreign exchange for the royal treasury. The king took one-tenth of the total earnings from pearl-diving and sale of pearls as his royalty.

The items incurring expenditure for the king include the military, gifts to poets and temples, maintenance of educational and health services, building infrastructure such as roads and irrigation and the palace household expenses. Tax remission also deprived the king of some revenue. Expenses incurred in connection with the recruitment and maintenance of the army and waging of war were a considerable drain on the treasury. The palace consisted of not only the members of the royal family but a vast crowd of merchants, officials and entertainers all of whom had to be compensated for their services – this was also a major item of expenditure.

== Bibliography ==
- Kanakasabhai, V (1904). The Tamils Eighteen Hundred Years Ago. Asian Educational Services, New Delhi.
- Subrahmanian, N (1972). History of Tamilnad. Koodal Publishers, Madurai.
- Balambal, V (1998). Studies in the History of the Sangam Age. Kalinga Publications, Delhi.
- Husaini, Dr. S.A.Q. (1962). The History of the Pandya Country. Selvi Pathippakam, Karaikudi.
- Sastri, K.A. Nilakanta (1972). The Pandyan Kingdom: From the Earliest Times to the Sixteenth Century. Swathi Publications, Madras.
