= Pandya coinage =

The earliest coins of the Pandyan Kingdom were copper squares and were struck with a die. The coins were with five distinct images on one side, often an image of an elephant on that side and a stylised fish on the other, seen typically in the coins found around Korkai, their ancient capital and in Northern Lanka. These rectangular coins of the early Pandyans also featured the Nandi bull and contain Chakrams. The "Chakram" consists of two lines forming an acute angle, the apex being uppermost; with are two crossed lines parallel to the sides of the angle which they join. All four lines end at the bottom of the symbol on the same level. This symbol but with the outer lines somewhat shorter than the inner is used by certain Tamils in the Anuradhapura District as a brand-mark for cattle; a variant with the outer lines continued beyond the apex in the form of a loop or of a pair of pincers occurs in the Northern Province and represents a makara. The symbol or brandmark on the coin being a conventional fish, the well-known Pandyans badge.

Upon the revival of the Kingdom in the 7th-10th centuries, the predominant image was one or two fish, and the Pandyan bull. Sometimes they were with other images like a "Chola standing figure" or the "Chalukyan boar." The inscription on the silver and gold coins is in Sanskrit, and most of their copper coins have Tamil legends. The Pandyan's coins figure prominently on the coins used in northern Sri Lanka during the early period, and large hoards of their coins have been found in Kandarodai and Anuradhapura from the Sangam period.

A rectangular Nandi Bull coin, Ceylon

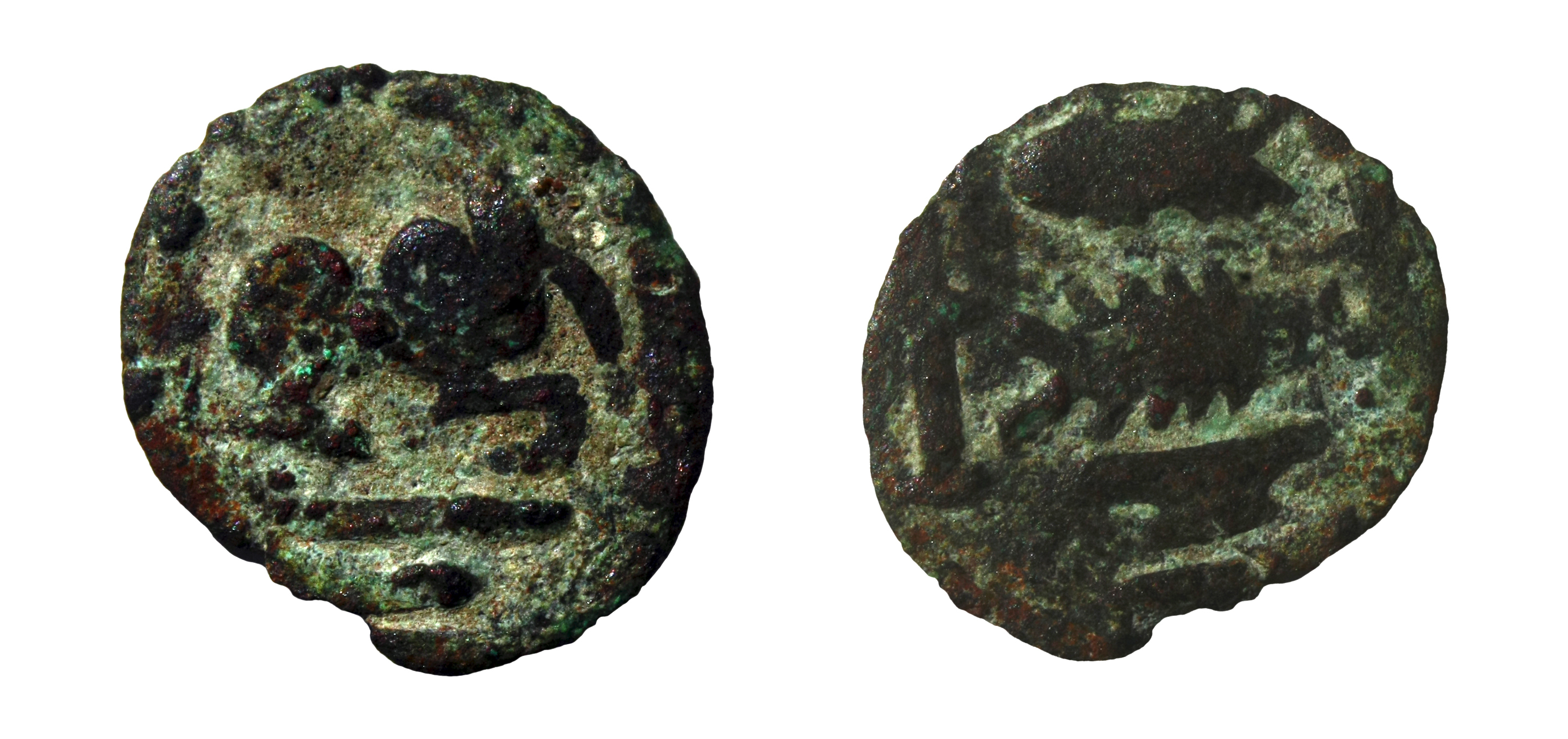
A Pandyan Nandi Bull coin, fishes on the reverse (found in Sri Lanka)

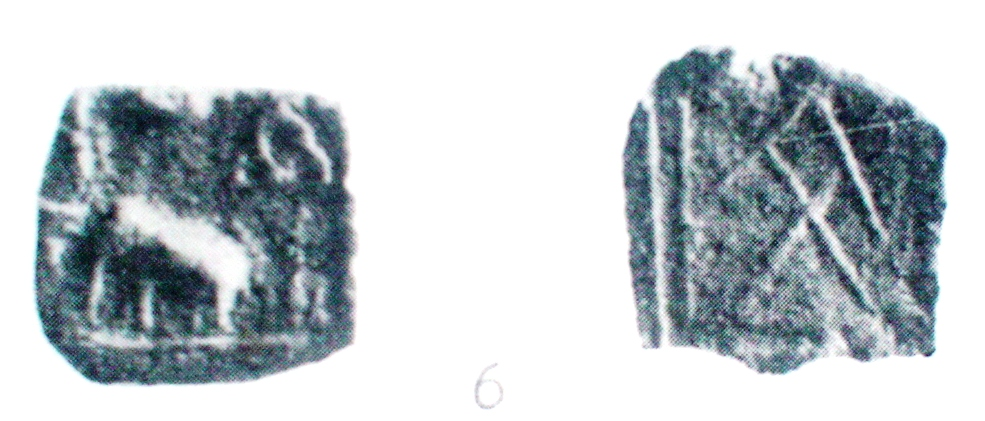
An Elephant and Fish coin, Ceylon

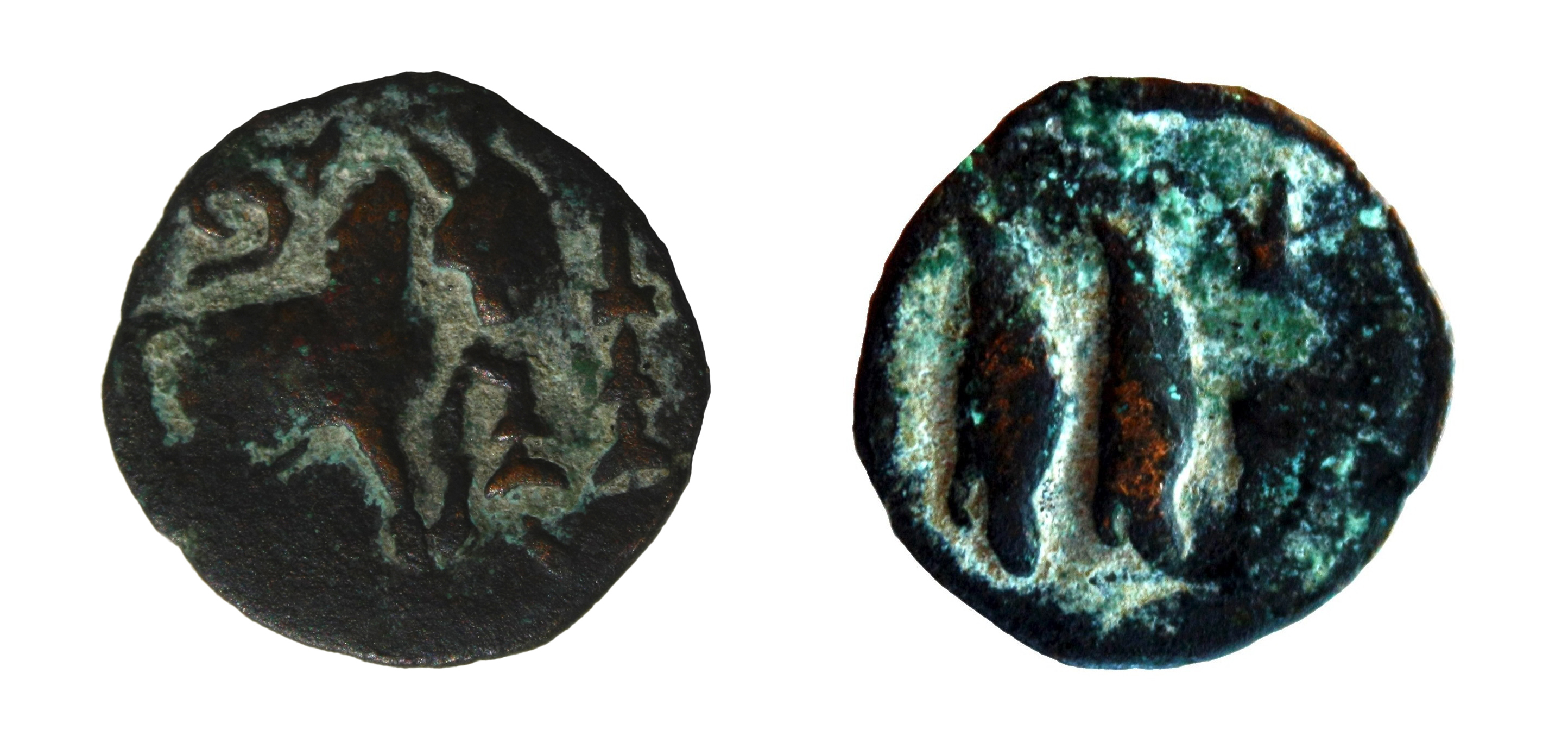
Three fishes (vertical) and horse standing before a lamps, Sri Lanka

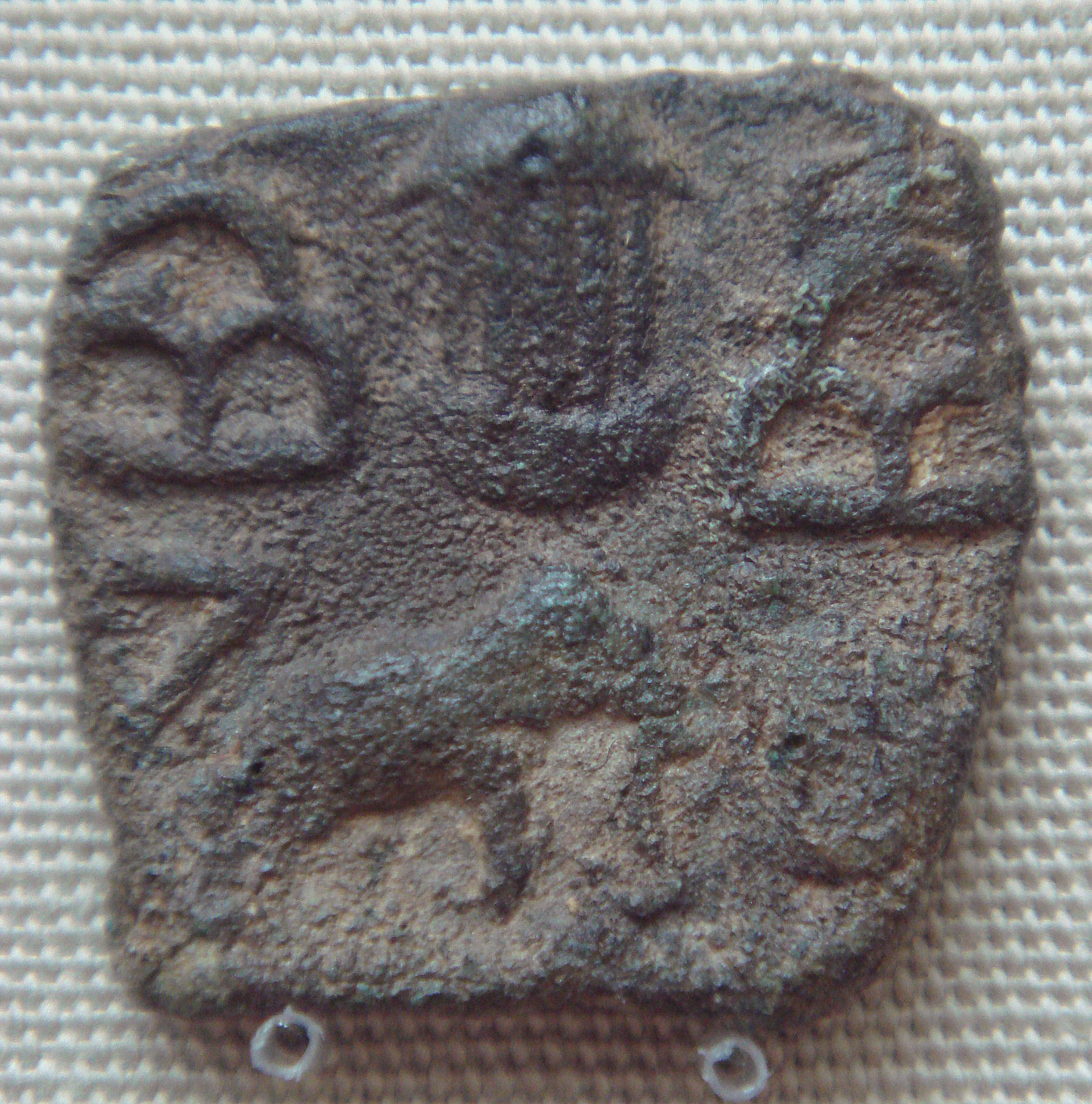
A temple between hill and elephant coin of the Pandyas, 1st century, Ceylon, British Museum
