= Nedunjeliyan II =

Early Pandya King (c. 210 CE)

- Thalaiyalankanathu Cheru-venda (he who won the Battle of Talaiyalanganam)
- Reign: 210 CE
- Dynasty: Pandyan

Nedunjeliyan II (Note: Also transliterated as Neṭuñceḻiyaṉ. (ISO 15919)) (c. 210 CE) (Tamil: நெடுஞ்செழியன்) was an Early Pandyan King during the Sangam era. He is known for defeating a confederacy of Cholas and Cheras at Thalayamangalam, near Tiruvarur, conquering most of the Tamil region, and contributing to Pandyan astrology. His deeds have been described in detail in the Madurai text.

== Quotes ==
"For a man to be defeated or slain by another man is the nature of this world.

Not knowing the majesty and greatness of King Chezhiyan who wears a garland braided with the bright tender leaves from the large branches of a thick-trunked neem tree in the courtyard, and long strands of ulignai vine, and another thickly woven garland flowing with honey, who has a sweet sounding kinai drum, wears gold ornaments, owns wealth and a rich country, the seven who came with warrior anklets, united, to fight with him, got defeated, their strengths ruined, as he felled them himself on the battlefield.

We have not heard about this before today."

— Purananuru - 76 , idaikundrur Kizhar.

== Reign ==
Nedunjeliyan II was a descendant of Nedunjeliyan I. His reign is generally fixed in the early 3rd century CE. Nedunjeliyan II ascended the throne at young age. Soon after, the kingdom was invaded by the Chola and Chera dynasties. Nedunjeliyan II defeated the invaders and pursued the retreating forces to Talaiyalanganam,(identified with a village of almost the same name, Talai-Alam-Kadu, eight miles north-west of Tiruvarur district) deep inside Chola territory. The Chera king Mandaranjeral Irumporai was taken captive by Nedunjeliyan II. During the battle Pandyan Nedunjeliyan ll captured entire Tamilakam up to Coorg and Mangalore.

Following his victory of Battle of Talaiyalanganam, Nedunjeliyan II mounted a campaign against the Velirs, Millalai, and Muttur.

== General citations ==
- Sastri, K. A. Nilakanta. A History of South India: From Prehistoric Times to the Fall of Vijayanagar. p. 115.
- Jyothisham, The Astrological Legacy of Nedunjeliyan II: Promoter of Navagraha Temples and Astronomical Alignment
- Team, Jyothisham (January 2025). "The Astrological Legacy of Nedunjeliyan II: Promoter of Navagraha Temples and Astronomical Alignment". jyothisham.com.
