= Pre-modern coinage in Sri Lanka =

Most of the pre-modern coinage used in Sri Lanka or coins used in pre-Christian Sri Lanka can be categorised as punch-marked coins (kahapana), (Bodhi) tree and railed swastika coins, elephant, lion (maneless and maned) coins, swastika coins and Lakshmi plaques.

== Punch-marked coins (Kahapana) ==
They are referred to as punch-marked coins or eldings. Similar coins have been unearthed throughout the island. Large numbers of such coins have been found in the North Central Province of Sri Lanka too but a study on regional varieties is yet to be done.

A punch marked coin

A punch marked coin

A kahapana coin

The reverse (?) of a kahapana coin

These punch marked coins are usually in silver and have assorted combinations of symbols punched on them, Usually the reverse of the coin is blank. Stylistically these coins are similar to coins used in the Indian sub-continent during this period. A recent publication on these coins attempts to identify symbols peculiar to Sri Lanka. Some of the more popular symbols are Sun, Moon, elephant, bull, nandipada, fish and peacock. The diversity of symbols suggests that these coins have been issued by regional rulers or traders and not by a central monarchy. They have been discovered at numerous archaeological sites, including Anuradhapura, Minuwangoda, Sigiriya, Tissamaharama, Kandarodai, Mannar, Mullaitivu and Jaffna.

== Tree and railed swastika coins ==
The tree and swastika coins are always cast. The tree on these coins is sometimes called a bo-tree, a tree with religious significance to Buddhists. However, as these coins are pre-Buddhist, the tree is more likely to be a widely accepted holy tree from the region.

A tree and swastika coin

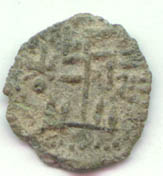
The reverse of the tree and swastika coin

== Elephant and swastika coins ==
The older coins of this type are cast and the later ones are struck. The cast coins are much thicker than the thinner struck coins. A struck coin is illustrated below.

An elephant and swastika coin

The reverse of the elephant and swastika coin

== Lion coins ==
Coins of this type were discovered inside the Jetavanarama Dagoba in Anuradhapura, constructed by King Mahasena, confirming that they were in circulation during his reign (277–304 CE). The coins are either cast or struck.

A maneless coin

The reverse of the maneless coin

== Lakshmi plaques ==
=== Chera coins ===
The goddess Lakshmi coins are either cast or struck. The two coins illustrated below are cast. They are found in may sizes ranging from about 3 inches to half an inch. The obverse of these coins bear the image of the goddess holding lotus stalks, surmounted by two elephants pouring water. Initially these were thought to be votive offerings. but now scholars are unanimous that they were indeed coins. They are early coins of the Chera Dynasty from about 500 BCE found in Kandarodai.

A goddess Lakshmi coin

The reverse of the goddess Lakshmi coin

A goddess Lakshmi coin

The reverse of the goddess Lakshmi coin

== The early period ==
=== Pandyan and Pallava coins ===
The bull, elephant and fish symbols figure prominently on the coins used in northern Sri Lanka by the Pandyan Dynasty during the early period. The lion features prominently on the Pallava coins.

A rectangular Nandi Bull coin

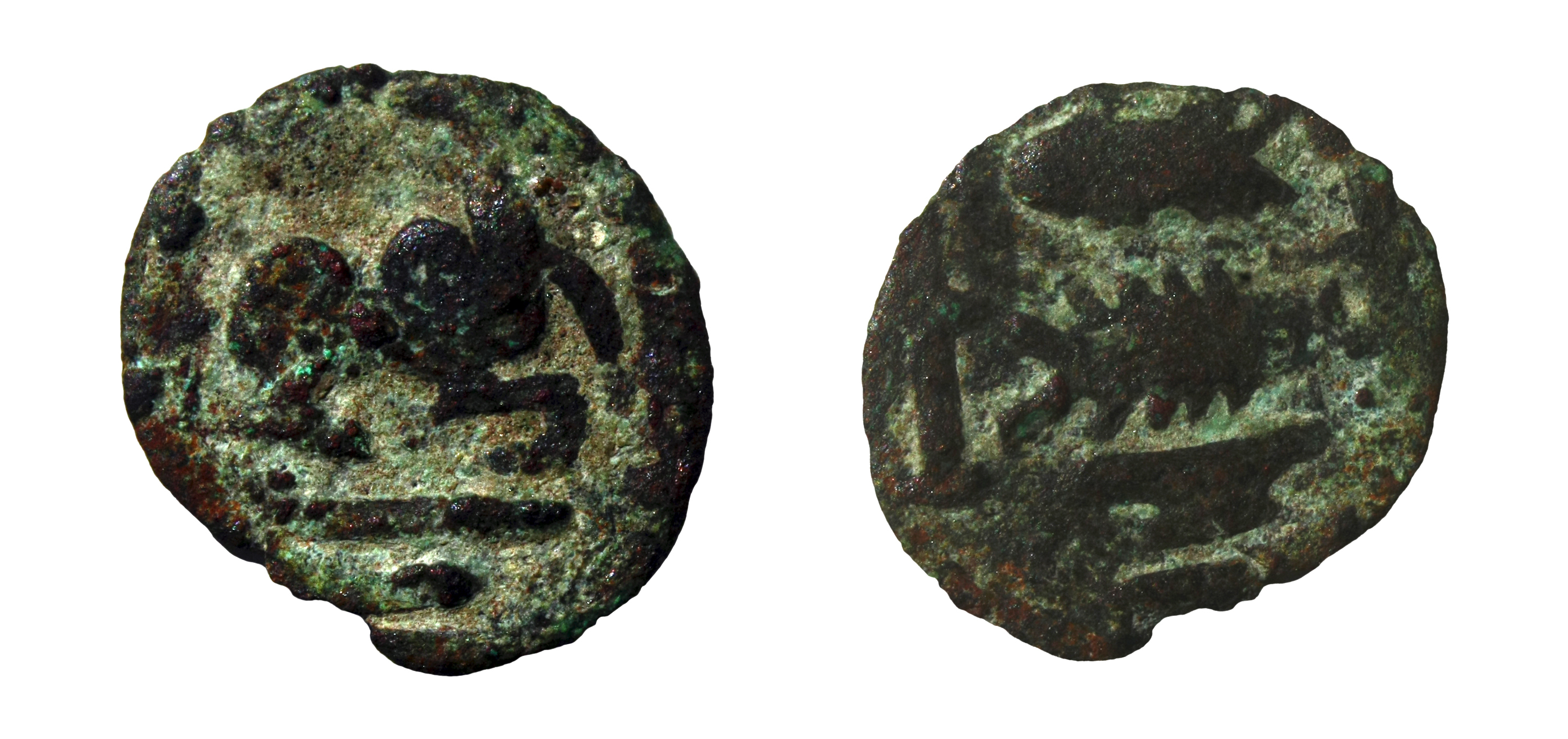
A Pandyan Nandi Bull coin, fishes on the reverse side

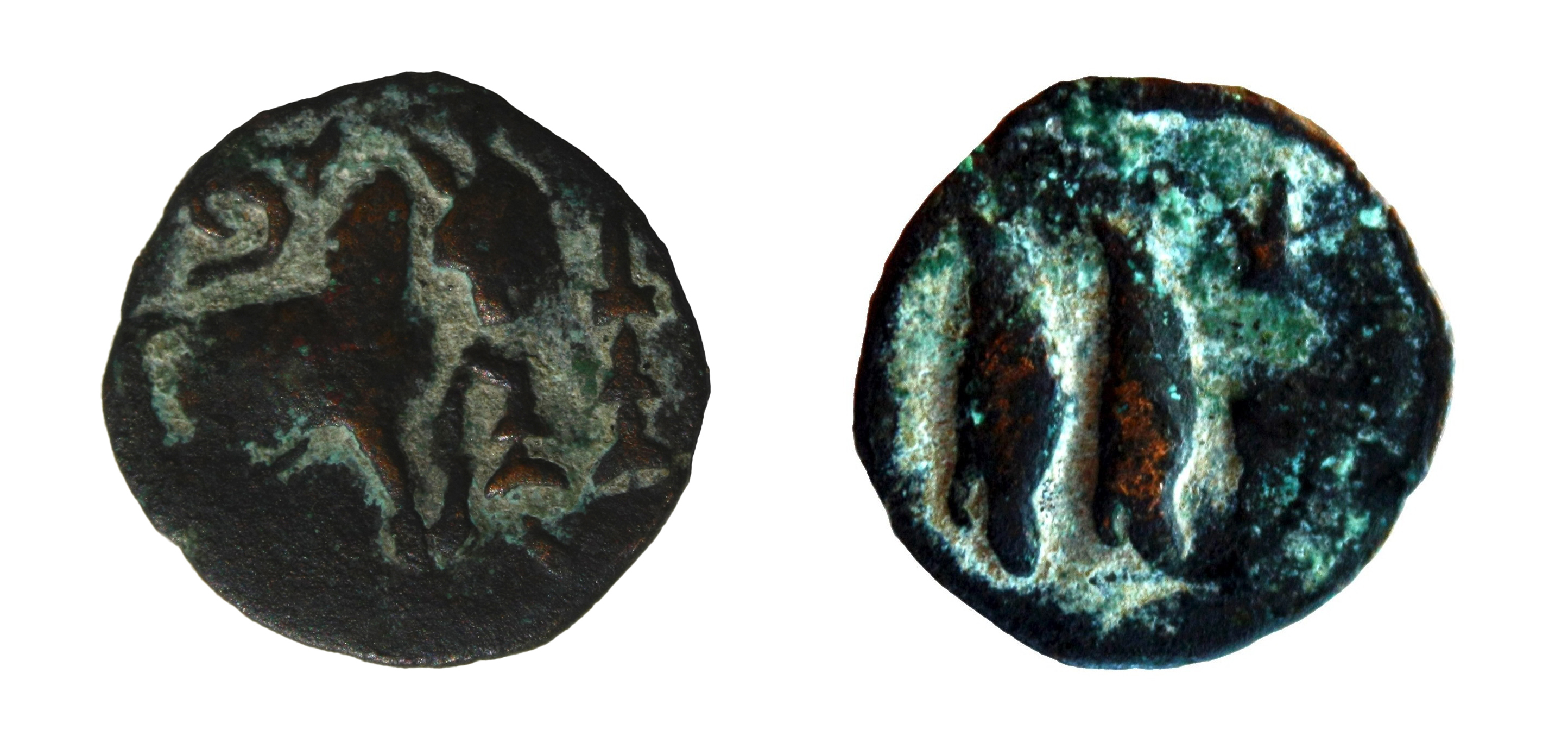
Three fishes (vertical) and horse standing before a lamp

A Pallava lion coin

The reverse of the Pallava lion coin

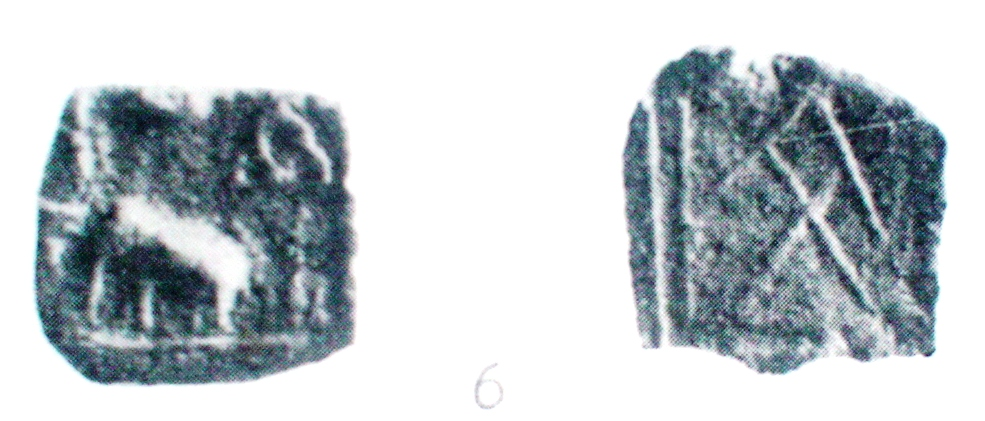
An Elephant and Fish coin

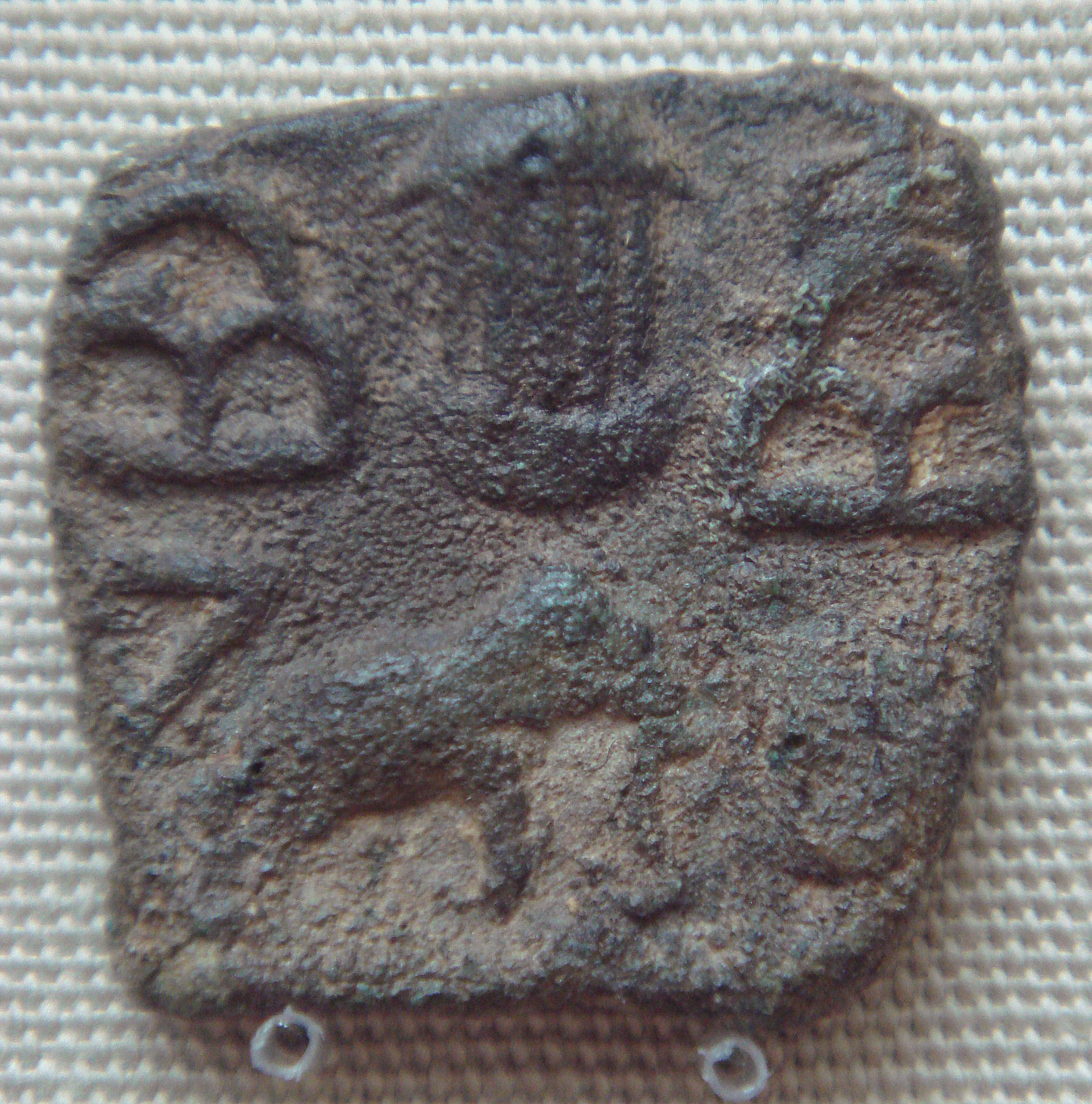
A temple between hill and elephant coin of the Pandyas, 1st century, Ceylon, British Museum

== The medieval period ==
=== Kahavanu ===
Kahavanu were gold coins used in ancient Sri Lanka, mainly during the late Anuradhapura period, between the 8th and 11th centuries CE. These coins typically featured a standing figure on one side and a seated figure on the other, along with various symbols and inscriptions. Kahavanu coins were produced in different denominations including half, quarter and eighth units and were widely used in trade and everyday transactions during this period.

A gold Kahavanu coin

The reverse of the gold Kahavanu coin

=== Chola coins ===
Gold and copper coins issued by the Chola ruler Rajaraja Chola (985-1014) are excavated from many parts of Sri Lanka. The obverse and reverse of these coins are similar to the common Dambadeniya Massa coins issued by later Kalinga and Pandya rulers of Sri Lanka. This prototype for the Dambadeniya coins uses Tamil characters on the reverse for the kings name.

A gold coin of Rajaraja Chola

The reverse of the Rajaraja Chola gold coin with a seated human figure and the king's name in Tamil

A copper coin of Rajaraja Chola with a Tiger besides the human figure

The reverse of the Rajaraja Chola copper coin with a seated human figure and the king's name in Tamil

A coin of Rajadhiraja Chola II with a lion surmounted by a sword

The reverse of the Rajadhiraja Chola II coin with his name in Devanagari

A silver coin of Uttama Chola with a Tiger and two fish

The reverse of Uttama Chola coin with his name in Devanagari

As illustrated above the lion symbol was used on Jaffna coins by Pallava rulers as well. The lion on the Rajadhiraja Chola II is very similar to the lion on the present Lion Flag of Sri Lanka.

=== Sethu bull coins ===
Several types of coins categorised as Sethu bull coins are found in large quantities in the northern part of Sri Lanka. Three types of this series are illustrated below. The obverse of these coins have a human figure flanked by lamps and the reverse has the Nandi (bull) symbol, the legend Sethu in Tamil with a crescent moon above. The obverse is similar to the contemporary Massa coins issued by the rulers of the central Sri Lankan kingdom of Dambadeniya.

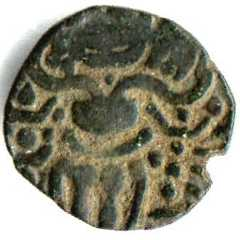
A Setu coin

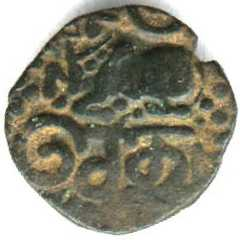
The reverse of the Setu coin

=== Polonnaruwa coins ===
The Late Kahavanu and Copper Massa were medieval coins used in Sri Lanka during the Polonnaruwa period, particularly between the 11th and early 13th centuries (c. 1070–1232 CE). Derived from the gold Kahavanu coins of the Anuradhapura period, the copper Massa became an important form of currency under the Sinhalese monarchs of Polonnaruwa. These coins typically featured a standing human figure on one side and a seated figure on the other, accompanied by the reigning monarch's name in Devanagari/Nāgarī script. They were issued under rulers including Vijayabahu I, Parakramabahu I, Nissanka Malla and Queen Lilavati. Copper Massa coins continued to circulate during the subsequent Dambadeniya period in the 13th century.

A coin of Vijayabahu I featuring a standing figure

The reverse of the coin of Vijayabahu I featuring a seated figure

A copper massa coin of Parakramabahu I featuring a standing figure

The reverse of the coin of Parakramabahu I featuring a seated figure

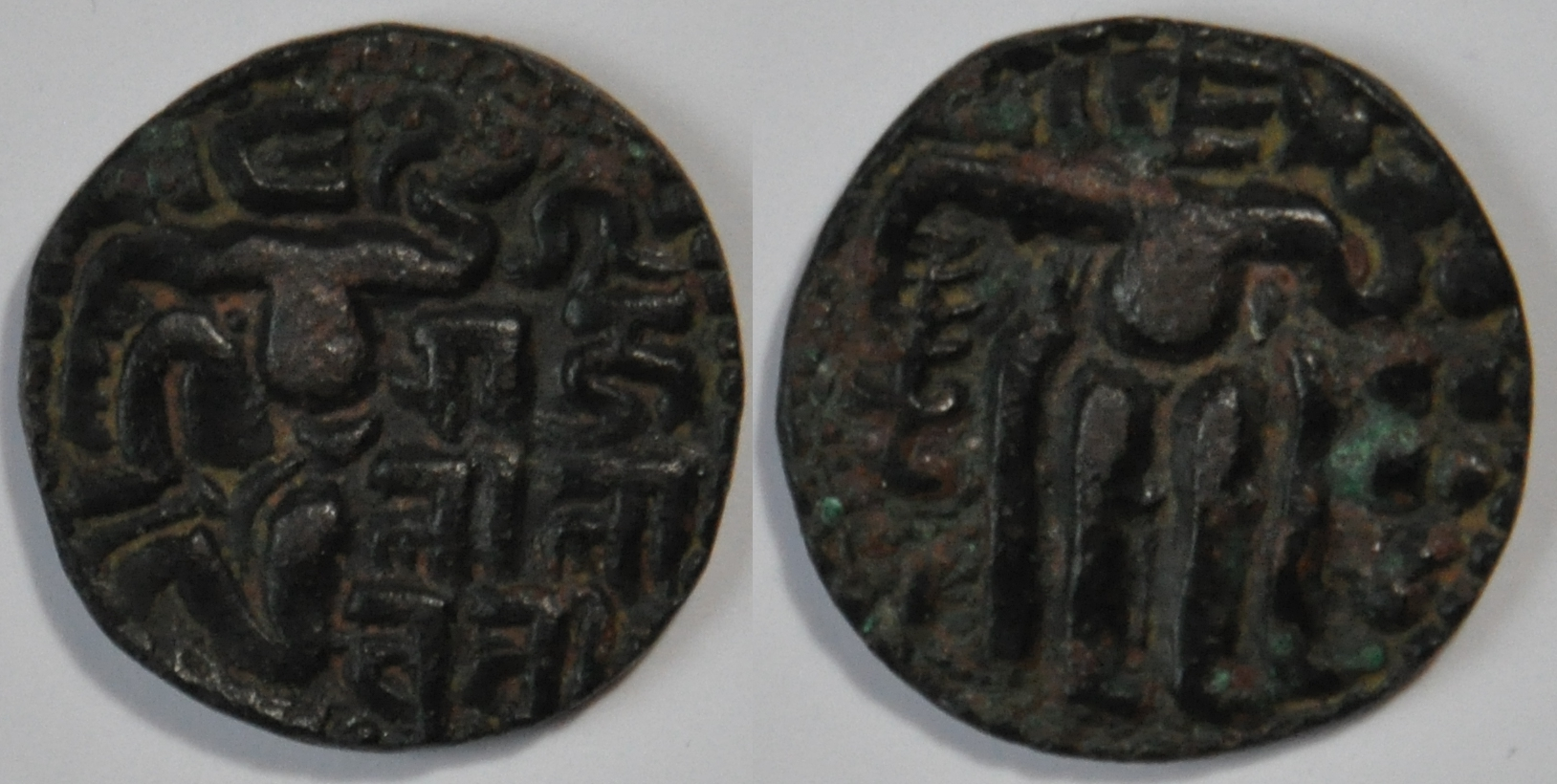
A copper massa coin of Queen Lilavati

=== Dambadeniya coins ===
The massa coins during this era also known as Dambadeni Kasi or Sinhala Massa continued to be used during the Dambadeniya period of Sri Lanka (c. 1220–1345 CE), particularly during the 13th century. These coins were largely similar to their earlier counterparts issued during the Polonnaruwa period, retaining the traditional copper coin design featuring a standing figure on one side and a seated figure on the other, often inscripted in Nagari script. They were issued under rulers such as Parakramabahu II.

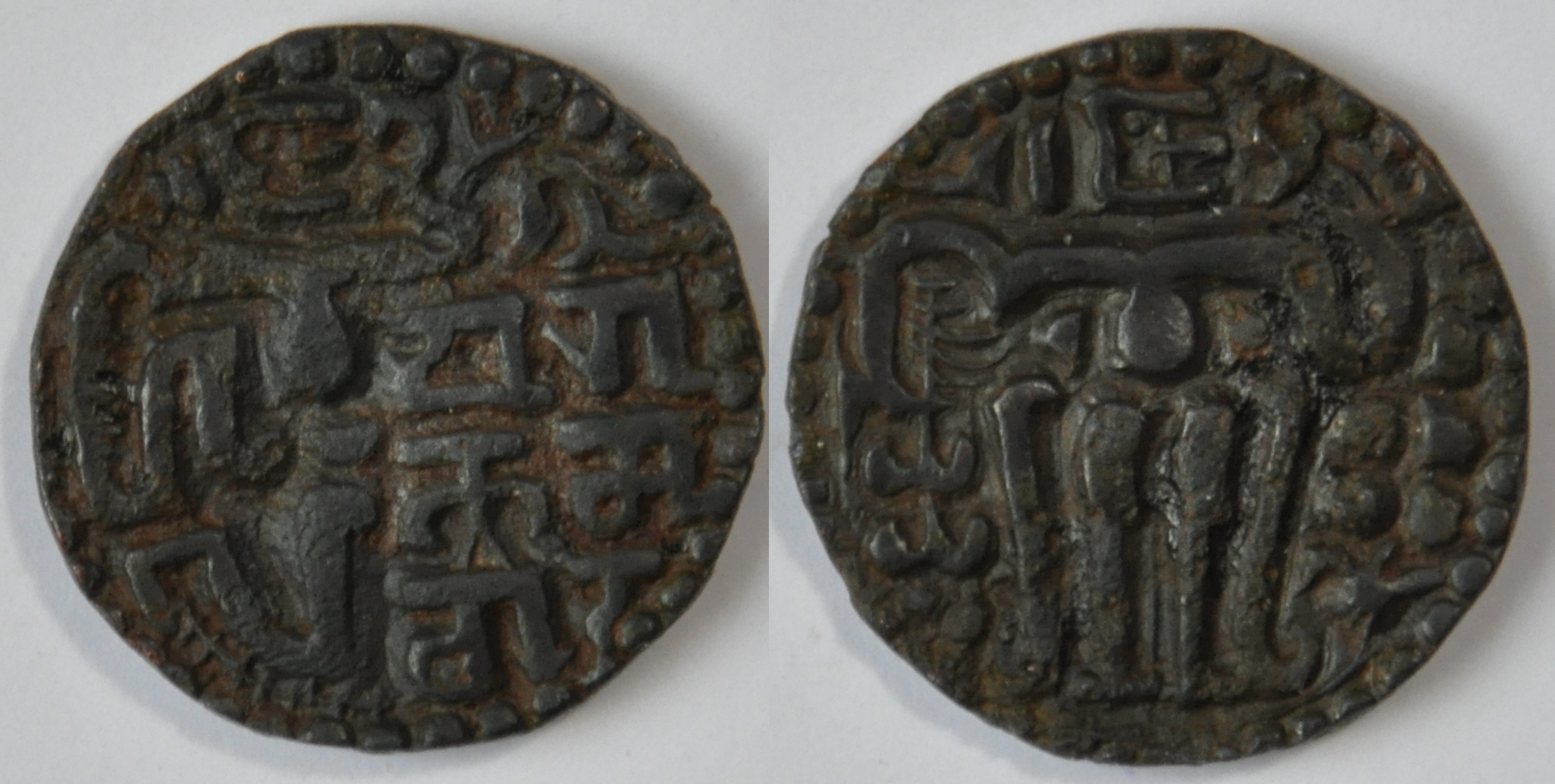
A massa coin of Parakramabahu II

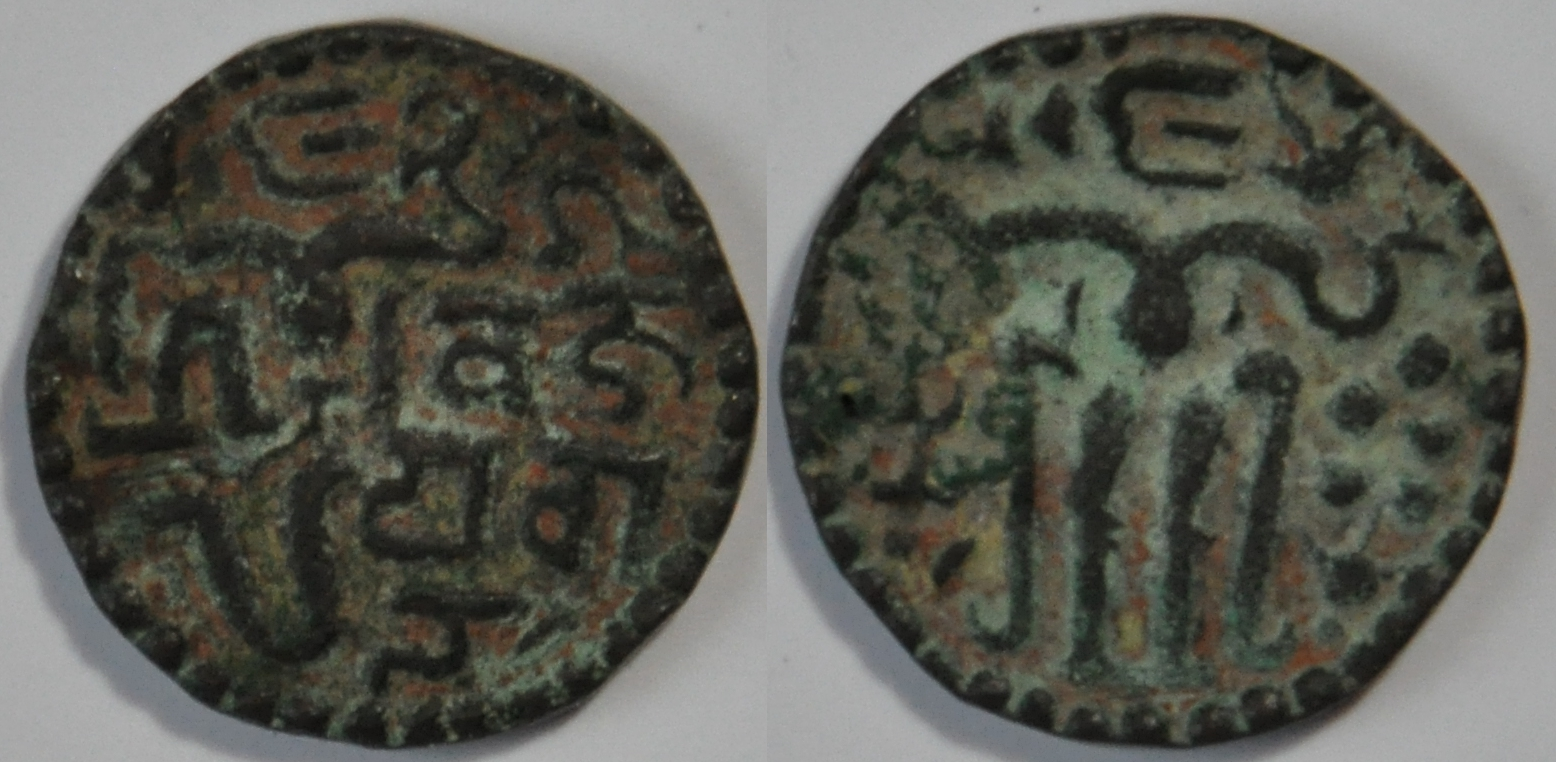
A massa coin of Vijayabahu IV

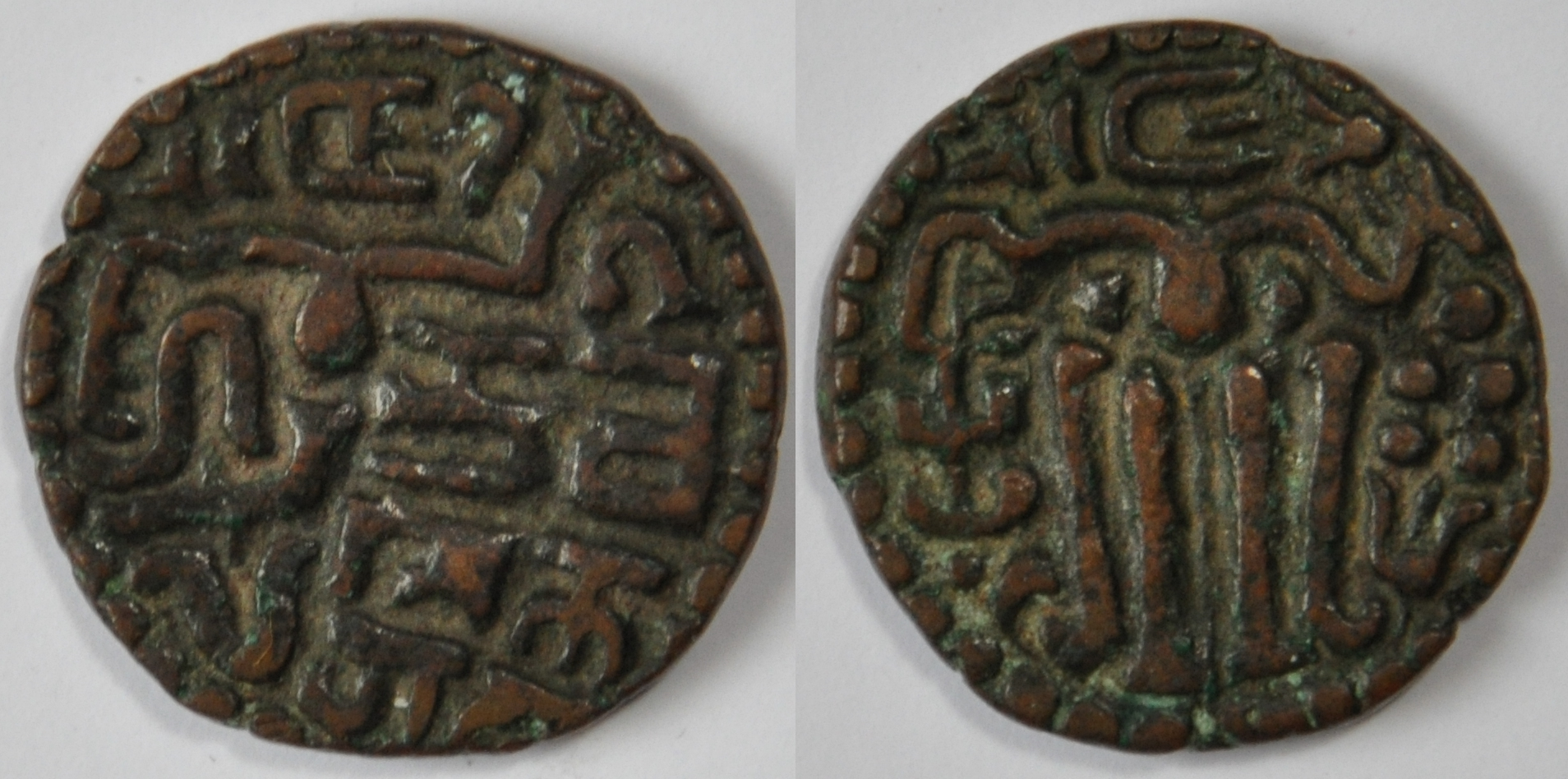
A massa coin of Bhuvanekabahu I

== The late period ==
These coins known as 'Parakramabahu lion type' are found in large numbers in the northern and western parts of Sri Lanka. The king is Parakramabahu VI of Kotte and the coins are believed to have been issued by Sapumal Kumara (also known as Chempaka Perumal) who ruled Northern peninsula from Nallur on behalf of the Kotte king, for some years. Although some writers have suggested that the lion represents Sinhala dominance over the Jaffna Kingdom, others have pointed out that the lion is stylistically Tamil, and unmistakably so.

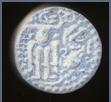
A Massa coin of Parakramabahu VI with the Nallur lion beside the human figure

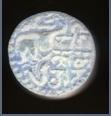
The reverse of the Massa coin of Parakramabahu VI with the king's name in Devanagari characters

== The Dutch period ==
These heavy rough copper coins were struck by the Dutch East India Company to use in the Jaffna territory. They were issued in the denominations of 1 and 2 Stuivers. These coins are also referred to as 'Dutch dumps'. Coins similar to those minted in Jaffna were minted in Trincomalee, Colombo and Galle as well and they bear the letters T, C and G respectively as mint marks.

A Dutch Stuiver struck in Negapatam with a human figure which appears to be a crude imitation of the figure on the Setu coins

The reverse of the Negapatam Stuiver with the legend Nagapattinam in Tamil

A Dutch stuiver struck in Jaffna with the VOC monogram of the Dutch East India Company surmounted by the letter J indicating that the coin was struck at the Jaffna mint

The reverse of the Jaffna Stuiver with the Tamil letters 'E' and 'B' abbreviation for Istrib (stuiver)
