= Early Pandyan kingdom =

South Indian kingdom of the Sangam period

The Early Pandyas of the Sangam period were one of the three main kingdoms of the Tamils, the other two being the Cholas, and Cheras dynasty. As with many other kingdoms around this period (earlier than 200 BCE), most of the information about the Early Pandyas come to modern historians mainly through literary sources and some epigraphic, archaeological and numismatic evidence. The capital of the Early Pandyan kingdom was initially Korkai, Thoothukudi and was later moved to Koodal (now Madurai) during the reign of Nedunjeliyan I.

The kings of the Pandyan dynasty are frequently mentioned in Sangam literature of the third century BCE and onwards, in literary works such as the Mathuraikkanci and other early Tamil literary works such as Cilapatikaram, which have been used by historians to identify their names and, to some extent, their genealogy. Nedunjeliyan II is referred to as the most popular warrior among the Early Pandyas, winning a battle at Talaialanganam against a coalition of forces from Cholas and Cheras and five other kingdoms. The early Pandyan kingdom extended between Travancore in the west, Vellaru river in the north and all the way to the ocean in the east and the south.

The Early Pandyas had active maritime trade relationships with the west, a fact testified by western classical writers such as Pliny the Elder (1st century CE), Strabo, Ptolemy and the author of the Periplus. The Pandyan country was well known for pearl fishery, with Korkai being the principal center of the trade. Some of the exports were pearls, spices, ivory and shells, while the imports included horses, gold, glass and wine.

== Origin and sources ==
The origin of the word "Pandya" has been a subject of much speculation.

Historians have used several sources to identify the origins of the Early Pandyan dynasty with the pre-Christian Era and also to piece together the names of the Pandyan kings. Unfortunately, the exact genealogy of these kings has not been authoritatively established yet.

One theory is that the word Pandya is derived from the Tamil word "Pandi" meaning bull. Ancient Tamils, considered the bull as a sign of masculinity and valor. Pandya became the epithet of the first Pandyan king of Thenmadurai (lit. south Mathurai), Kulasekharan Pandya as he was built like a bull. It was used as an epithet of masculinity. His son, the second king of Thenmadurai, the legendary Malayadhwaja Pandya who sided with the Pandavas and took part in the Kurukshetra battle is described as follows in Karna Parva (verse 20.25).

Malayadhwaja Pandya and his queen Kanchanamala had one daughter Thathagai alias Meenakshi who succeeded her father and ruled the kingdom successfully. The Madurai Meenakshi Amman temple was built after her. The city of Madurai was built around this temple.

Yet another theory suggests that in Sangam Tamil lexicon, the word Pandya means old country in contrast with Chola meaning new country, Chera meaning hill country and Pallava meaning branch in Sanskrit. The Chera, Chola and Pandya are the traditional Tamil siblings and together with the Athiyamaan are the major Kings that ruled ancient Tamilakkam.

=== Literary sources in Tamil ===
Several Tamil literary works, such as Iraiyanar Akapporul, mention the legend of three separate Tamil Sangams lasting several centuries before the Christian Era and ascribe their patronage to the Pandyas. The Sangam poem Maduraikkanci by Mankudi Maruthanaar contains a full-length description of Madurai and the Pandyan country under the rule of Nedunjeliyan II. The Nedunalvadai by Nakkirar contains a description of the king's palace. The Purananuru and Agananuru collections of the third century BCE contain poems sung in praise of various Pandyan kings and also poems that were composed by the kings themselves. Kaliththokai mentions that many Dravidian tribes such as Maravar, Eyinar, Oliar, Oviar, Aruvalur and Parathavar migrated to the Pandyan kingdom and started living there in the Third Tamil Sangam period 2000 years ago.

The Chinese historian Yu Huan in his 3rd century text, the Weilüe, mentions The Kingdom of Panyue:

"...The kingdom of Panyue is also called Hanyuewang. It is several thousand li to the southeast of Tianzhu (Northern India)...The inhabitants are small; they are the same height as the Chinese..."

The Roman emperor Julian received an embassy from a Pandya about 361 CE. A Roman trading centre was located on the Pandyan coast (Alagankulam - at the mouth of the Vaigai river, southeast of Madurai). Pandyas also had trade contacts with Ptolemaic Egypt and, through Egypt, with Rome by the first century, and with China by the 3rd century. The 1st century Greek historian Nicolaus of Damascus met, at Damascus, the ambassador sent by an Indian King "named Pandion or, according to others, Porus" to Caesar Augustus around 13 CE (Strabo XV.1-4, and Strabo XV.1-73).

=== Epigraphical sources ===
The 2nd and 13th rock edicts of Ashoka (273 - 232 BCE) refers to the Pandyas, Cholas, Cheras and the Satyaputras. According to the edicts, these kingdoms lay outside the southern boundary of the Mauryan Empire. The Hathigumpha inscriptions of the Kalinga King Kharavela, (c. 150 BCE), refers to the arrival of a tribute of jewels and elephants from the Pandyan king. The stone inscriptions discovered at Mangulam (a.k.a. Meenakshipuram) mentions the name of Nedunj Cheliyan III and his contemporary and subordinate, Kadalan Vazhuthi.

=== Archeological sources ===
Excavations in Tamil Nadu in the last fifty years or so have yielded remnants of black-and-red pottery ware, normally assigned to the Tamil speaking areas around 300 BCE. Some all-black and Russet coated ware assigned to the same time period have also been found. Rouletted and Amphorae wares, made in the Roman empire and brought by traders, have been excavated in several parts of Tamil Nadu, including the Pandyan country. These imported wares are dated to the early centuries of the Christian Era.

=== Numismatic sources ===
The excavations at Alagankulam, near Madurai, recovered two copper coins of the early Pandyas along with Northern Black Polished Ware. These coins have been assigned a broad time period ranging from 200 BCE to 200 CE. Several coins issued by the Pandyan king Mudukudumi Peruvaludhi have been recovered in the Madurai area and have been dated to around 200 BCE. Many gold and silver coins of the Roman empire have been found around Madurai: these coins bear the names of emperors ranging from Augustus (27 BCE) to Alexander Severus (235 CE).

== History ==
Scholars have attempted to reconstruct the political history of the ancient Pandya country based on classical works such as the Purananuru, the Pattuppāṭṭu and the Padirrupattu.

The first Pandyan king who has been mentioned in the Sangam works recovered so far is Nedunjeliyan I, who ruled from the coastal town of Korkai, at the mouth of river Tamraparni. During this time, the Tamil country consisted of several small kingdoms ruled over by independent chieftains, in addition to the three monarchies of Cheras, Cholas and Pandyas. In a bid to expand his territory, Nedunj Cheliyan I invaded the kingdom of Koodal (later renamed Madurai), which was under the rule of an independent chieftain, Akutai. He defeated Akutai and moved the capital of Pandyan kingdom to Madurai. This king also defeated an invading army from the Deccan Plateau and hence was called Aariyap Padaikadantha Pandyan. He was succeeded by his son Pudappandiyan, who expanded the kingdom by conquering Ollaiyur (near modern-day Pudukkottai) – an act that earned him the name Ollaiyur Thantha Pudappandian. Both Pudappandiyan and his predecessor, Nedunj Cheliyan I, were poets themselves who contributed to the Purananuru collection.

The successor of Pudappandiyan was Nedunj Cheliyan II also known as "Pasumpun Pandyan". Immediately after ascending the throne, he marched with his troops to the north of Vaigai and defeated the chieftain Evvi II. He then headed west and captured the Aayi territory controlled by another chieftain, Atiyan. Both Evvi II and Atiyan were made commanders of the Pandyan army for his battles against Kongu country that was further west. From here he expanded the Pandyan kingdom almost to the western coast, which earned him the title Vidambalamba Ninra Pandyan (the Pandyan whose kingdom was washed by two seas). Since he was responsible for expanding the Pandyan kingdom by annexing several kingdoms, he was also called Pannadu Thantha Pandyan (the Pandyan who annexed many lands). His successor, Mudukudumi Peruvaludhi, was also a great warrior and carried the devastation into enemy territories. He performed yagas with the aid of Brahmin priests, similar to the tradition in northern India at that time.

The next king in the hierarchy was Nedunj Cheliyan III, who is considered the greatest of all the early Pandyan kings. Since the Pandyan kingdom was considerably larger than a few generations ago, he had to defend it against many neighbors invading from various fronts. Not only did he succeed in defending his territory, he also seems to have advanced into the enemy territories – the southern province of Cholas and eastern province of the Cheras. At one point, it is said that a coalition of his neighbors including the Cheras, Cholas and five other kingdoms, met him at a pitched battle in Talaialanganam, in present-day Tanjore district. Nedunj Cheliyan emerged victorious in the battle that ensued and ended up annexing several new territories to his kingdom. He thus came to be known as Talaialanganathu Seruvendra Pandyan. The genealogy after this king is not very clear but there are at least four other kings who are thought to have ruled in the immediate succeeding generations. Notable among them were, Musiri Mutriya Cheliyan for the fact that he conquered the town of Musiri on the coast of the Arabian Sea and Ukkirap Peruvaludi for the fact that it was in his court that the famous poet Tiruvalluvar submitted his much-acclaimed work Tirukkural. Ilanji Vel is one among the ancient velirs of the Yadu Kingdom.[1] He ruled a territory called Ilanji, near Courtallam. He belongs to the clan of ancient Pandyas.

== Government ==
The head of the government was the king, a hereditary monarch. His power was restricted by the Aimberunguzhu (Tamil: ஐம்பெருங்குழு) or the Five Great Assemblies, which consisted of the representatives of the people, priests, physicians, astrologers and the ministers. There was another assembly of officials that served the king called the Enberaayam (Tamil: எண்பேராயம்) or the Eight Groups of Attendants. While some scholars believe it consisted of attendants on the king's person like the perfumers, dressing valets, etc., others believe it consisted of more important persons like the people of the capital city, the leaders of the elephant corps and of the cavalry. The principal officers of State were the high priest, the chief astrologer, the ministers and the commanders of the army. The king divided his territory into a number of administrative units or principalities, each called a Kootram (Tamil: கூற்றம்). A Kootram was further divided into provinces called Mandalam, which in turn was divided into many sub-provinces called Nadus, with each Nadu consisting of many villages. A locality inside a town or village was called Ur and each neighborhood inside an Ur was called a Cheri. While the king ruled over his entire territory from the capital, he often placed one or more principalities (Kootram) under the near-sovereign government of some senior member of the royal family or a feudatory. The village was the most fundamental unit of administration under the Pandyas. The affairs of a village were the responsibility of its elders, who supervised the judicial, administrative and financial functions.

Justice was administered free of charge, by special officers appointed as judges and magistrates, but the king was supreme and the final arbiter in all civil and criminal cases. Mortgage, lease, trust property, loans, breach of contract were some common sources of civil litigation, while criminal offences included theft, adultery, forgery and treason. The punishments were very severe and hence crimes were rare: one caught in the act of burglary, adultery or spying was given the death penalty and one giving false testimony would have his tongue cut off. The king was the chief commander of the army and usually led his army in the battlefield. The military was said to be fourfold : the infantry, the cavalry, the elephantry and the chariotry. A wide variety of war weapons filled the military arsenal including shields, swords, spears, tridents, maces, bows and arrows. The main sources of royal revenue were taxes, tributes, customs duties and tolls. Land tax, paid in money or in kind, and income tax, equal to one-sixth of an individual's income, were the major types of taxes collected. Other sources of revenue include tributes paid by feudal subordinates, war booty presents by loyal and visiting subjects, treasure troves besides land revenue, cess and forced gifts. The items incurring expenditure for the king include the military, gifts to poets and temples, maintenance of educational and health services, building infrastructure such as roads and irrigation and the palace household expenses.

Women were exposed to education, a fact testified by the presence of many women poets in the Sangam works – some of them include Avvaiyar, Mudatamakkanniar, Kaakkaippaadiniyaar, Naachchellayaar, Naagaiyaar, Nanmullaiyaar, Ponmudiyaar, Ilaveyiniyaar and Nappasaliyaar.

A variety of clothing was used by people during this age, including those made of cotton and silk. People living in hilly and deserted areas wore dresses made of foliage and flowers. Sheaths of grassy weeds (Korai) were used for making dress by the hill and forest area people. Skins of animals and barks of trees were also used. Men of the poorer classes wore only one piece of cloth around the waist. Women covered their upper body with a kind of dress called kachchu. Among the higher classes, men wore two pieces: one around the waist and the other, the upper cloth, thrown over the shoulders. Women of sophisticated society wore half sarees, made of the finest cotton and silk fabrics, with embroidery. Both men and women sported long tresses of hair. The diet was plain, rice being the staple cereal, with millet, milk, butter and honey being in common use. Meat eating was discouraged as expounded in the ancient Tamil literature Thirukkural, Naladiyar etc. The kind of housing was determined by the type of geography of the land and the economic status of the occupants. The rich built their houses with tiled roofs and walls made of burnt bricks and mud, while the poor built their huts with mud and thatched it with grass, coconut leaves or palmyra palm leaves. Both in the huts and houses, the flooring was smeared with cowdung. The affluent had houses with porticoes, many storeys, open terraces and furnished their houses well. The inner walls of their houses were decorated with flowers and paintings, with cottages to protect them from the wind. Cots were in common use – the rich had luxurious beds decked with swan's feathers and flowers, while the common people had beds woven with the straw of maize and the poorest people used beds made of grass or hay.
