= Tamilakam =

Geographical region inhabited by the ancient Tamil people

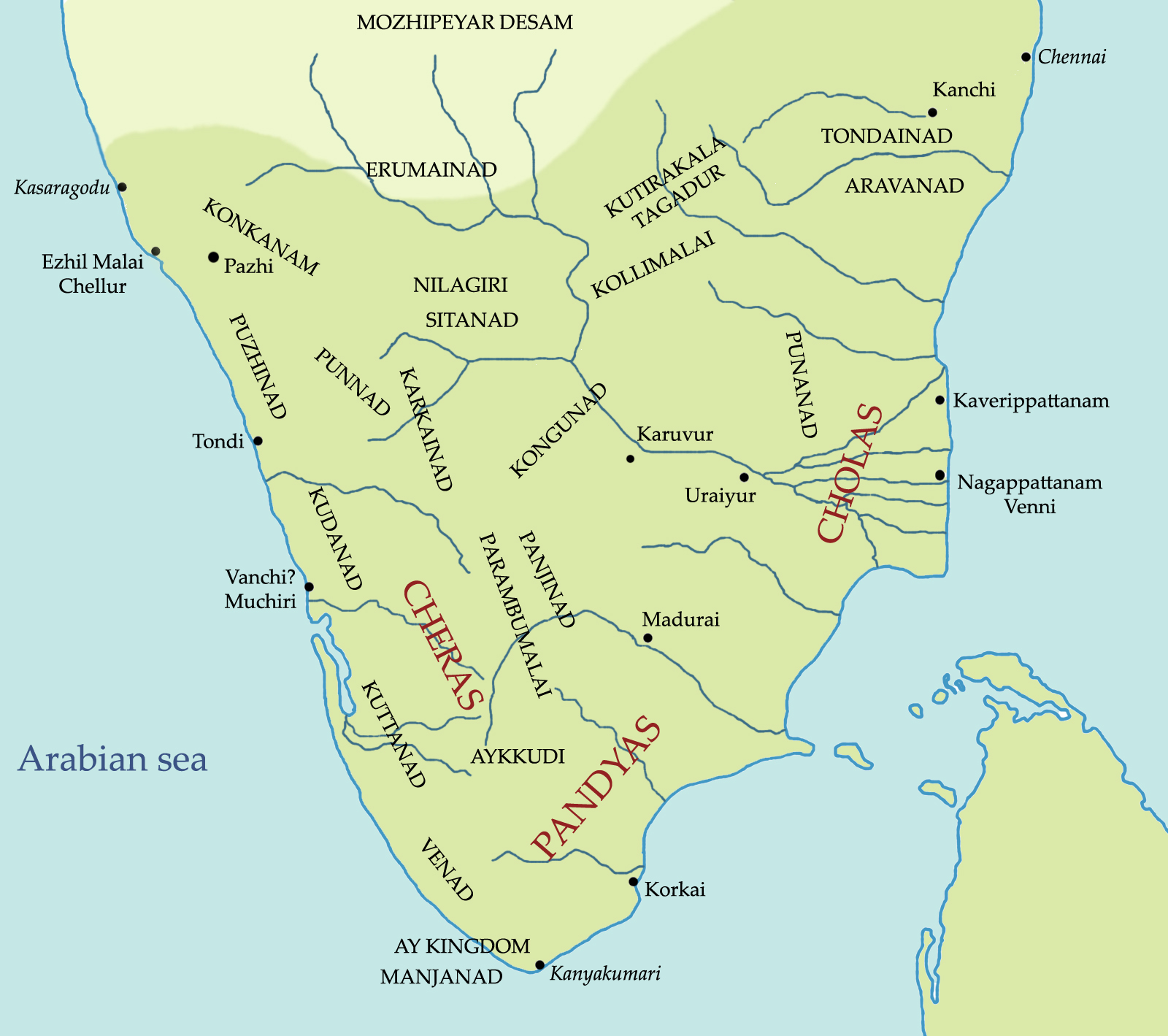
Tamilakam in the Sangam Period.

Tamilakam (Tamil: தமிழகம், romanised: Tamiḻakam), also known as ancient Tamil country, was the geographical region inhabited or dominated by the ancient Tamil people, covering the southernmost region of the Indian subcontinent. Tamilakam occupied today's Tamil Nadu, Kerala, Puducherry, Lakshadweep and southern parts of Andhra Pradesh and Karnataka. Traditional accounts and the Tolkāppiyam referred to these territories as a single cultural area, where Tamil was the natural language (Note: Thapar mentions the existence of a common language of the Dravidian group: "Ashoka in his inscription refers to the peoples of South India as the Cholas, Cheras, Pandyas and Satiyaputras - the crucible of the culture of Tamilakam - called thus from the predominant language of the Dravidian group at the time, Tamil".) and permeated the culture of all its inhabitants. (Note: See, for example, Kanakasabhai.) The ancient Tamil country was divided into kingdoms. The best known among them were the Cheras, Cholas, Pandyas and Pallavas.

During the Sangam period, Tamil language and culture began to spread outside Tamilakam. Ancient Tamil settlements were recorded in the Maldives, in Sri Lanka, and in few coastal locations of Southeastern Asia. Modern populations such as the Giravarus, or the Sri Lankan Tamils, derive some of their roots from these waves of migration and cultural diffusion.

During the Classical ages, the region of Tamilakam mostly remained unconquered by dynasties and centres of power established in the northern part of the subcontinent, such as the Maurya Empire and Gupta Empire while having exchanges with them.

The Cheras, Cholas, and Pandyas frequently competed for political supremacy, and Sangam literature contains references to conflicts and claims of superiority among them. Poems attributed to Ilango and Kovur Kilar describe rival royal emblems and ceremonial honours in ways that suggest the subordination of one ruler to another. This political and psychological background contributed to the circumstances that led to warfare.

In contemporary India, Tamil politicians and orators often use the name Tamilakam to refer to Tamil Nadu alone.

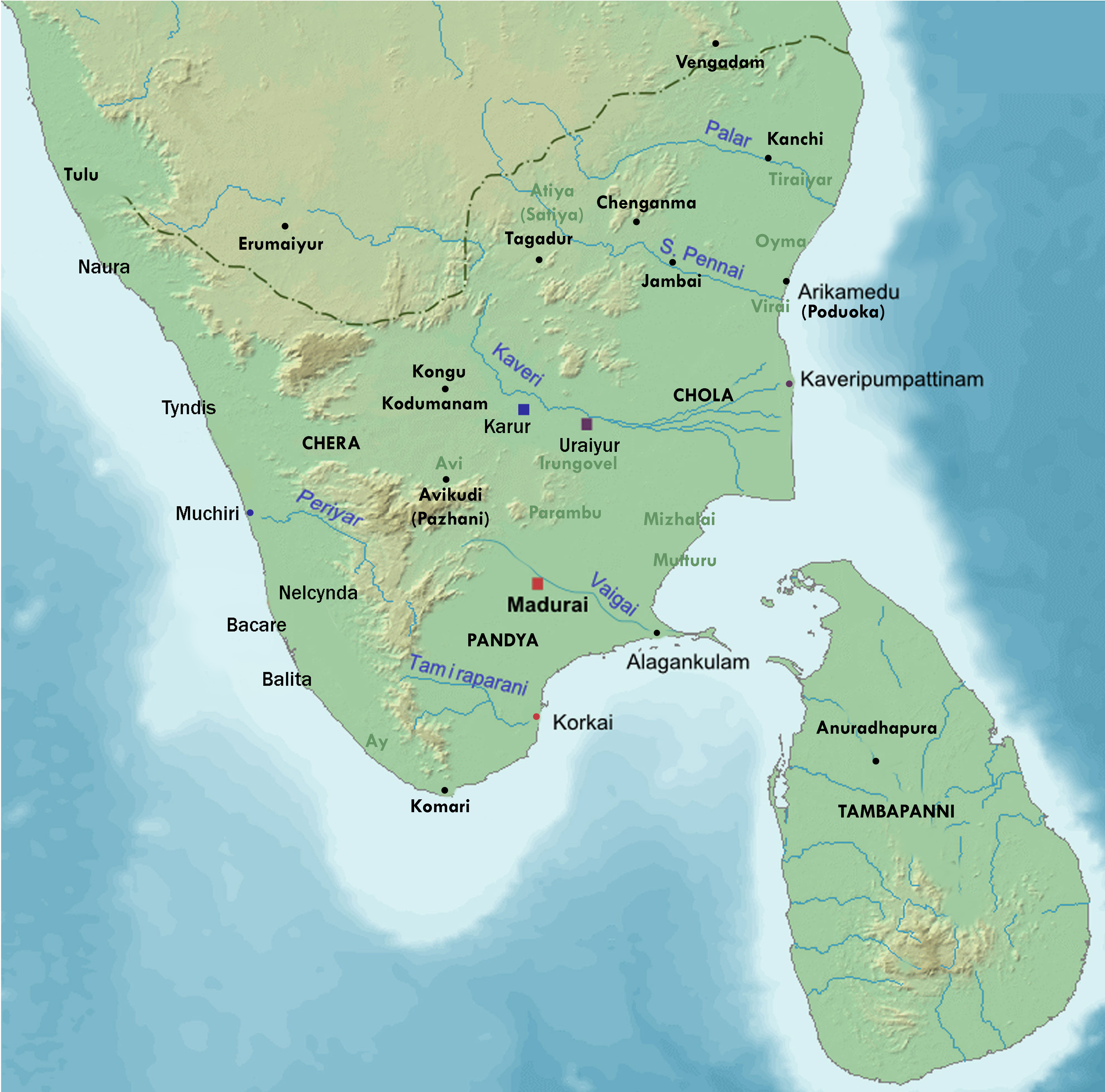
Tamilakam ports

== Etymology ==
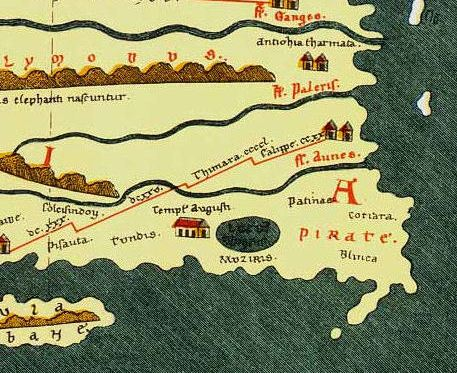
Part of Tamilakam from Tabula Peutingeriana

"Tamiḻakam" (தமிழகம்) is a combination of a word and suffix from the Tamil language, namely Tamiḻ (தமிழ்) and -akam (-அகம்). It can be roughly translated as the "home of Tamil". According to Kamil Zvelebil, the term seems to be the most ancient term used to designate Tamil territory in the Indian subcontinent.

The Periplus of the Erythraean Sea, as well as Ptolemy's writings, mention the term "Limyrike" which corresponds to the Malabar Coast of south-western India. The Roman map Tabula Peutingeriana includes a place named "Damirica" (or "Damirice") and because this sounds like "Tamil," some modern scholars have equated it with Limyrike, considering both to be synonyms of "Tamilakam". However, the "Damirice" mentioned in the Tabula Peutingeriana actually refers to an area between the Himalayas and the Ganges.

== Extent ==
The term "Tamilakam" appears to be the most ancient term used for designating the Tamil territory. The earliest sources to mention it include Purananuru 168.18 and Patiṟṟuppattu Patikam 2.5. The Specific Preface (cirappuppayiram) of the more ancient text Tolkāppiyam mentions the terms tamil-kuru nal-lulakam ("the beautiful world [where] Tamil is spoken") and centamil ... nilam ("the territory ... of refined Tamil"). However, this preface, which is of uncertain date, is definitely a later addition to the original Tolkāppiyam. According to the Tolkāppiyam preface, "the virtuous land in which Tamil is spoken as the mother tongue lies between the northern Venkata hill and the southern Kumari."

The Silappadikaram (c. 2nd century CE) defines the Tamilakam as follows:

The Tamil region extends from the hills of Vishnu [Tirupati] in the north to the oceans at the cape in the south. In this region of cool waters were the four great cities of: Madurai with its towers; Uraiyur which was famous; tumultuous Kanchi; and Puhar with the roaring waters [of the Kaveri and the ocean].

While these ancient texts do not clearly define the eastern and western boundaries of the Tamilakam, scholars assume that these boundaries were the seas, which may explain their omission from the ancient definition. Tamilakam thus included ancient Kerala. However, it excluded the present-day Tamil-speaking territories in North-East Sri Lanka.

== Subdivisions ==
=== Kingdoms ===
From around 600 BCE to 300 CE, Tamiḻakam was ruled by the three Tamil dynasties: the Chola dynasty, the Pandyan dynasty and the Chera dynasty. There were also a few independent chieftains, the Velirs (Satyaputra). The earliest datable references to the Tamil kingdoms are in inscriptions from the 3rd century BCE during the time of the Maurya Empire.

The Chola dynasty ruled from before the Sangam period (~3rd century BCE) until the 13th century in central Tamil Nadu. The heartland of the Cholas was the fertile valley of the Kaveri. The Pandyan dynasty ruled parts of South India until the late 17th century. The heartland of the Pandyas was the fertile valley of the Vaigai River. They initially ruled their country from Korkai, a seaport on the southernmost tip of the Indian Peninsula, and in later times moved to Madurai. The Chera dynasty ruled from before the Sangam period (~3rd century) until the 12th century over an area corresponding to modern-day western Tamil Nadu and Kerala.

The Vealirs (Vēḷir) were minor dynastic kings and aristocratic chieftains in Tamiḻakam in the early historic period of South India.

=== Nations of Tamilakam ===
Tamiḻakam was divided into political regions called Perunadu or "Great country" ("nadu" means country).

There were three important political regions which were Chera Nadu, Chola Nadu and Pandya Nadu. Alongside these three, there were two more political regions of Athiyaman Nadu (Sathyaputra) and Thamirabharani Nadu (Then Paandi) which were later on absorbed into Chera and Pandya Nadu by 3rd century BCE. Tondai Nadu which was under Chola Nadu, later emerged as independent Pallava Nadu by 6th century CE.

Tamilakam was also divided into 13 socio-geographical regions called Nadu or "country", each of which had their own dialect of Tamil.

- Aruva Vadathalai Nadu
- Kakkanadu
- Kuda Nadu
- Kuttanadu
- Malai Nadu
- Puzhi Nadu
- Erumai Nadu
- Panri Nadu
- Punal Nadu
- Sida Nadu
- Thenpandi Nadu
- Tondai Nadu
- Tulu Nadu
- Venadu

=== Nations outside Tamilakam ===
Some other Nadus are also mentioned in Tamil literature which were not part of Tamilakam, but the countries traded with them in ancient times.

- Eela Nadu (Ceylon)
- Naga Nadu (Jaffna Peninsula)
- Vengi Nadu
- Chavaka Nadu (Java)
- Kadara Nadu (Kedah)
- Kalinga Nadu
- Singhala Nadu (Ceylon)
- Vadugu Nadu
- Kannada Nadu (Land of Kannada people)
- Telunka Nadu (Land of Telugu people)
- Kolla Nadu
- Vanka Nadu
- Magadha Nadu
- Kucala Nadu
- Konkana Nadu
- Kampocha Nadu (Cambodia)
- Palantivu Nadu (Maldives)
- Kupaka Nadu
- Marattha Nadu
- Vatuka Nadu
- Tinmaitivu (Andaman and Nicobar Islands)

=== European references to the Tamil kingdoms ===
The Tamil kingdoms of southern India—including the Chola, Pandya, and Chera dynasties—were referred to by various names in European historical sources from classical antiquity through the early modern period. These references appear primarily in Greek and Roman geographical works, medieval travel accounts, and early modern colonial records. The names used were typically transliterations of local Tamil terms or adaptations into Greek and Latin phonetic systems.

Classical antiquity (Greek and Roman sources) Greek and Roman authors from approximately the 3rd century BCE to the 3rd century CE described the Tamil kingdoms as part of the broader region known as India, but also referred to specific kingdoms and regions by distinct names.

Regional names

The Tamil-speaking region, known locally as Tamilakam, was referred to by several names in Greco-Roman geography, including: Damirica (Damirice or Dimirice) – widely believed to be a transliteration of "Tamilakam". Limyrike (Limyrica) – used primarily to describe the southwestern coast of India, associated with the Chera kingdom. These names appear in works such as the Periplus of the Erythraean Sea (1st century CE) and the Geographia of Ptolemy (2nd century CE).

Pandya kingdom The Pandya kingdom was referred to as:Pandion Pandaea Greek and Roman writers often used "Pandion" as a dynastic title rather than a personal name. The Pandya kingdom is mentioned in the works of Megasthenes, Strabo, Pliny the Elder, and Ptolemy. Megasthenes described the kingdom of Pandaea as occupying the southernmost part of India and ruled by a hereditary dynasty. Pliny the Elder also referred to the Pandya kingdom and its trade relations with Rome.

Chola kingdom The Chola kingdom was identified in classical sources under names such as:Cholae Colchi Sorae These names appear in Ptolemy’s geographical accounts. The Chola territory was noted for its coastal ports and maritime trade networks. The port of Kaberis Emporion, identified with Kaveripattinam, was mentioned as a major trading centre.

Chera kingdom The Chera rulers were referred to by names including:Cerobothra Kerobothra These terms appear in Greco-Roman texts and are believed to represent transliterations of Chera royal titles. The Chera kingdom controlled important ports along the Malabar Coast, including Muziris, a major centre of Indo-Roman trade described in the Periplus of the Erythraean Sea. Archaeological discoveries of Roman coins and amphorae in Kerala and Tamil Nadu confirm extensive trade between the Chera kingdom and the Roman Empire.

Medieval European references During the medieval period, European knowledge of southern India was transmitted largely through Arab intermediaries and travel accounts.

Maabar The Tamil region, particularly the Pandya kingdom, was referred to as Maabar (or Mabbar). Marco Polo described Maabar as a wealthy kingdom known for pearls and maritime trade.

Coromandel Coast The eastern coast of Tamil Nadu came to be known as the 'Coromandel Coast, derived from the Tamil word Cholamandalam (realm of the Cholas). This term became widely used by Portuguese, Dutch, and British traders from the 16th century onward.

Early modern European usage

With the arrival of European colonial powers, references to Tamil regions became more standardised. Common names included: Coromandel Coast, Malabar Coast, Kingdom of Tanjore, Carnatic. These names appear frequently in European administrative and trade records from the 16th to 18th centuries.

Significance in European accounts European sources consistently described the Tamil kingdoms as independent political entities and important centres of maritime trade. They were known for exporting:

1. Pearls
2. Pepper
3. Textiles
4. Ivory
5. Precious stones

Archaeological evidence, including Roman coin hoards found in Tamil Nadu, supports the existence of extensive trade relations between the Tamil kingdoms and the Roman Empire.

== Geocultural unity ==
A major part of ancient Tamilakam lies in the modern Indian states of Kerala and Tamil Nadu

Although the area covered by the term "Tamilakam" was divided among multiple kingdoms, its occurrence in the ancient literature implies that the region's inhabitants shared a cultural or ethnic identity, or at least regarded themselves as distinct from their neighbours. The ancient Tamil inscriptions, ranging from 5th century BCE to 3rd century CE, are also considered as linguistic evidence for distinguishing Tamilakam from the rest of South India. The ancient non-Tamil inscriptions, such as those of the northern kings Ashoka and Kharavela, also allude to the distinct identity of the region. For example, Ashoka's inscriptions refer to the independent states lying beyond the southern boundary of his kingdom, and Kharavela's Hathigumpha inscription refers to the destruction of a "confederacy of Tamil powers".

== Interaction with Sri Lanka ==
During the protohistoric period (1000-500 BCE) Sri Lanka was culturally united with southern India, and shared the same megalithic burials, pottery, iron technology, farming techniques and megalithic graffiti. This cultural complex spread from southern India along with Dravidian clans such as the Velir, prior to the migration of Prakrit speakers. The Annaicoddai seal, dated to the 3rd century BCE, contains a bilingual inscription in Tamil-Brahmi. (Note: An archaeological team led by K.Indrapala of the University of Jaffna excavated a megalithic burial complex at Anaikoddai in Jaffna District, Sri Lanka. In one of the burials, a metal seal was found assigned by the excavators to c. the 3rd century BCE.) Excavations in the area of Tissamaharama in southern Sri Lanka have unearthed locally issued coins produced between the second century BCE and the second century CE, some of which carry Tamil personal names written in early Tamil letters, which suggest that Tamil merchants were present and actively involved in trade along the southern coast of Sri Lanka by the late classical period. Around 237 BCE, "two adventurers from southern India" took control of the Anuradhapura kingdom. In 145 BCE Elara, a Chola general or prince known as Ellāḷaṉ took over the throne at Anuradhapura and ruled for forty-four years. Dutugamunu, a Sinhalese, started a war against him, defeated him, and took over the throne. Tamil Kings have been dated in Sri Lanka to at least the 3rd century BCE.

== Religion ==
Hinduism (Vaishnavism, Kaumaram, Shaktism, Shaivism, Dravidian folk religion), Jainism and Buddhism have coexisted in the Tamil country since at least the second century BCE.

== Economy ==
The economy of the ancient Tamil country (Sangam era: 600 BCE–300 CE) describes the ancient economy of a region in southern India that mostly covers the present-day states of Tamil Nadu and Kerala. The main economic activities were agriculture, weaving, pearl fishery, manufacturing and construction. Paddy was the most important crop; it was the staple cereal and served as a medium of exchange for inland trade. Pepper, sugarcane, millets, and various other cereals were other commonly grown crops. Madurai and Urayur were important centres for the textile industry; Korkai was the centre of the pearl trade. Industrial activity flourished.

== Agriculture ==
During the Sangam age, 700 BCE–100 CE, agriculture was the main vocation of the Tamil. It was considered a necessity for life, and hence was treated as the foremost among all occupations. The farmers or the Ulavar were placed right at the top of the social classification. As they were the producers of food grains, they lived with self-respect. Agriculture during the early stages of Sangam period was primitive, but it progressively got more efficient with improvements in irrigation, ploughing, manuring, storage and distribution. The ancient Tamils were aware of the different varieties of soil, the kinds of crops that can be grown on them and the various irrigation schemes suitable for a given region. These were also in Madras, Thanjore (now as Chennai, Thanjavur respectively).

== Industry ==
During the Sangam age, industrial activity was considered ancillary to agriculture and was mostly domestic, not factory-based. Simple workshops where the blacksmith made the wheel or the carpenter his wooden wares could be called factories of a sort. Weaving, pearl fishing, smithy and ship building were some of the prominent industries of the ancient Tamil country. Cotton and silk fabrics from Madurai and Urayur were in great demand; the textiles from these regions were well known for their high quality. Korkai was the centre of pearl trade and produced pearls that were sought after not only in Tamilakam, but in the kingdoms of north India and Rome. Smithy was an essential industry, because the blacksmith manufactured many of the tools and objects used in daily life. The flourishing overseas trade was supported by the shipbuilding industry that produced a variety of ocean and river craft. There were several ancillary industries such as carpentry, fishing, salt manufacture and construction that supported the trade and economic activity of this age.

== See also ==
- Sources of ancient Tamil history
- Chronology of Tamil history
- History of Tamil Nadu
- History of Kerala

== Sources ==
=== Printed sources ===
- Abraham, Shinu (2003). "Chera, Chola, Pandya: using archaeological evidence to identify the Tamil kingdoms of early historic South India". Asian Perspectives. 42 (2): 207–223. doi:10.1353/asi.2003.0031. hdl:10125/17189. S2CID 153420843. Archived from the original on 15 February 2009 – via Questia.
- John E. Cort, ed. (1998), Open Boundaries: Jain Communities and Cultures in Indian History, SUNY Press, ISBN 0-7914-3785-X
- Aiyangar, Muttusvami Srinivasa (1986). Tamil studies: essays on the history of the Tamil people, language, religion, and literature. Asian Educational Services. ISBN 9788120600294.
- Aiyaṅgār, Sākkoṭṭai Krishṇaswāmi (1994). Evolution of Hindu Administrative Institutions in South India. Asian Educational Services. ISBN 978-81-206-0966-2.
- Deegalle, Mahinda (2006). "Buddhism, Conflict and Violence in Modern Sri Lanka". Routledge.
- Hanumanthan, Krishnaswamy Ranaganathan (1979). "Untouchability: a historical study upto 1500 A.D. : with special reference to Tamil Nadu". Koodal Publishers.
- Holt, John (2011). "The Sri Lanka Reader: History, Culture, Politics". Duke University Press.
- Indrapala, K. (1969). "Early Tamil settlements in Ceylon". Journal of the Ceylon Branch of the Royal Asiatic Society, 1969, XIII:54.
- Kanakasabhai, V (1904). The Tamils Eighteen Hundred Years Ago. Asian Educational Services. ISBN 8120601505.
- Krishnan, Shankara (1999). Postcolonial Insecurities: India, Sri Lanka, and the Question of Nationhood. University of Minnesota Press. p. 172. ISBN 0-8166-3330-4.
- Mahadevan, Iravatham (2002). "Aryan or Dravidian or Neither? – A Study of Recent Attempts to Decipher the Indus Script (1995–2000)". Electronic Journal of Vedic Studies. 8 (1). Archived from the original on 23 July 2007.
- Manogaran, Chelvadurai (1987). "Ethnic Conflict and Reconciliation in Sri Lanka". University of Hawaii Press.
- Rajayyan, K. (2005). "Tamil Nadu, a real history". Ratna Publications.
- Ramaswamy, Sumathi (1997). Passions of the Tongue: Language Devotion in Tamil India, 1891-1970. University of California Press. ISBN 978-0-520-20805-6.
- Ramaswamy, Vijaya (2007). Historical Dictionary of the Tamils. Scarecrow Press. ISBN 978-0-8108-5379-9.
- Reddy, L.R. (2003). "Sri Lanka: Past and Present". APH Publishing.
- Singh, Upinder (2009). "A History of Ancient and Early Medieval India: From the Stone Age to the 12th Century". Pearson Education India.
- Smith, Vincent A. (1999). The Early History of India. Atlantic Publishers & Dist. ISBN 978-81-7156-618-1.
- Thapar, Romila (2004). Early India: From the Origins to AD 1300. University of California Press. ISBN 9780520242258.
- Wenzlhuemer, Roalnd (2008). "From Coffee to Tea Cultivation in Ceylon, 1880-1900: An Economic and Social History". BRILL.
- Zvelebil, Kamil (1973). "The smile of Murugan on Tamil literature of South India". Leiden: Brill.
- Zvelebil, Kamil (1992). "Companion studies to the history of Tamil literature". BRILL.
