= Maturaikkāñci =

Ancient Sangam era Tamil poem about Madurai city

Maduraikanchi (Tamil: மதுரைக் காஞ்சி) is an ancient Tamil poem in the Sangam literature. It is a didactic poem and its title connotes the "poetic counsel addressed to the king of Madurai". Composed by Mankuti Marutanar – probably the chief court poet of the Pandya king Nedunjeliyan II, the Maduraikkāñci is the sixth poem in the Pattuppāṭṭu anthology. The poem is generally dated to the late classical period (2nd to 4th century CE).

Maduraikkanci is the longest poem in the Pattuppāṭṭu collection with 782 lines of poetry. Many of the verses are in akaval meter and others in vanci meter. It is a detailed description of life and bustle in the ancient city of Madurai. The poem praises the king for all his accomplishments and strengths. Embedded indirectly within the poem is the poet's counsel to the king on justice, the impermanence of everything in life, and the proper rule of the kingdom.

In addition to Madurai, the poem is another source of historic information about the Tamil region. It mentions seaports in the neithal coastline, the prosperous marutham farms, the hilly kurinchi region, the palai arid area. Madurai is described as the capital city with fortified gates, broad streets, mansions and big markets. The Maduraikkanci presents the social and economic life of the city in five sections, under the following subheadings: morning, evening, dusk, night, and dawn. The morning market is described as busy with throngs of people of various creed, race and languages. Elephant- and horse-pulled chariots carry the elite and the soldiers through the streets.

The city has many temples, families buy and carry votive offerings to the gods in these temples, and inside these temples are musicians playing various styles of music, according to Maduraikkanci. Newly married women pray inside the temple, light lamps and make offerings to the goddesses, to be blessed with children. Women wear flowers in their hair and jewelry when they visit the temples and markets. The temples are officiated by priestesses. Men dance inside Murugan temples. The Brahmins chant the Vedas. The bards sing in the street about wars and victories, people listen and make donations. Mahouts host elephants and feed them fodder. The shopkeepers stock their shops and clean their floors, then smear them with a coating of cow dung. Watchmen announce the hour. The city has a zoo, while from the trees the birds sing and invite their mates. Women participate in agricultural and economic activity.

The Maduraikkanci describes a well-structured administration in Madurai. The king had ministers, officials and judges, who wore turbans. Patrolmen and soldiers watched the streets, collected tolls and protected the traders from acts of theft. The city is described largely in terms of its markets and temples. Lines 497 to 511 allude to gods and goddesses in these temples with iconographic items of Hinduism. Vishnu is called the ruler of the three worlds and it identifies Rama and Krishna as his incarnations, Shiva (Rudra) is alluded to with "god who wields the battle-ax", while Vishnu is alluded to with "god who protects the world". City gates had symbols of Lakshmi, the goddess of wealth and Vishnu's wife. A bathing festival with ritual dip in the waters to "cleanse their sins" is mentioned in the poem. Chanting of the Vedas is mentioned in lines 512–518, as is the presence of Jain monks and Buddhist monasteries alluded to in lines 519–528 and elsewhere in the poem. The lines related to the Vedas, states Chelliah, alludes to the jivanmukta ideology found in Hinduism.

== See also ==
- Ten Idylls
- Eighteen Greater Texts
- Sangam literature
