= Kongu Chera dynasty =

South Indian dynasty

Chera dynasty Cheras of Karur-Vanchi
- Capital: Karur (Vanchi)
- Common languages: Tamil
- Religion: Hinduism
- Today part of: India

Kongu Chera dynasty, or Cheras or Keralas (Note: The term 'Kerala', originally a non-Dravidian title related to the Tamil root 'Chera' or 'Cheraman/Cheralan', refers here to the name of a tribe or clan, not to the modern Malayalam-speaking geographical entity (the state of Kerala). The tribal or clan name was later transferred to the geographical region now known as the state of Kerala.) of Kongu or Karur, or simply as the Chera dynasty, was a medieval royal lineage in south India that initially ruled over western Tamil Nadu and central Kerala. The headquarters of the medieval Cheras was located at Karur-Vanchi (present-day Karur), an ancient base of the early historic Cheras in central Tamil Nadu. The Chera rulers were subordinate to, or were conquered by, the Chalukya, Pallava, and Pandya kings. The Rashtrakuta and Chola rulers are also said to have overrun the Kongu Chera country.

The medieval Cheras claimed descent from the Cheras who flourished in pre-Pallava (early historic) south India. Present-day central Kerala likely detached from the larger Chera kingdom around the 8th-9th century AD to form the Chera kingdom on the western coast (fl. c. 9th – 12th century AD; modern Kerala). The exact relationship between the different branches of the Chera family — such as the one based in Karur and the other in Mahodayapuram-Kodungallur — is not clearly understood by scholars.

The Kongu Cheras are often described as members of the Chandra-Aditya Kula (the Luni-Solar Race) around 9th–11th centuries AD. By the 10th–11th century AD, they appear to have been completely absorbed into the Pandya political system. A collateral branch of the Kongu Cheras, known as the "Kongu Cholas", later ruled the Kongu country under Chola suzerainty.

== Political history ==
In ancient and medieval sources, "Kerala" and "Chera" were used interchangeably for both the dynasty and its territory, unlike their modern usage.

The following description incorporates corrections made by M. G. S. Narayanan (Perumals of Kerala, 1972 & 1996) to the revised second edition of K. A. Nilakanta Sastri's work, as well as the writings of Elamkulam P. N. Kunjan Pillai.

=== Rulers of western Tamil Nadu and Kerala ===
The Cheras, or "the Keralas", of the early medieval period initially appear as rulers of western Tamil Nadu and central Kerala, with their headquarters at Karur in interior Tamil Nadu. The dynasty claimed descent from the legendary Cheras who flourished in pre-Pallava (early historic) southern India. Through the family name "Chera", the clan professed a connection to the prestigious world of the Sangam poetry. It is likely that the Cheras followed a system of joint rule, with each elder of the family governing a different region. At least three centers are known: Karuvur Vanchi (interior Tamil Nadu), Muchiri-Vanchi (central Kerala), and Thondi (north-central Kerala).

By the beginning of the early medieval period, Karur had gained prominence over the other two bases, Muchiri-Vanchi and Thondi. Records indicate that by the 8th – 9th centuries AD, Karur was known as "Vanchi ma-nakara-mana Karur" (or Karur-Vanchi). It has been speculated, based on later Kerala traditions such as the Keralolpatti, that the Cheras of Karur may have exercised authority over present-day Kerala, possibly through some form of viceregal rule.

Available epigraphic evidence points to the influence of several other dynasties over the old Chera country during this period. The earliest Chalukya ruler to claim overlordship over the Chera/Kerala is Kirttivarman I (fl. 566 - 598 AD), although this claim is generally regarded by historians as a boastful exaggeration. A later grant dated 695 AD by king Vinayaditya II Satyasraya, which refers to the "vassalage" of the Kerala country, is considered a more reliable record. Several Chalukya inscriptions from the 7th and 8th centuries mention the conquest and vassalage of the Kerala country. Additionally, a number of Pallava records also refer to the vassalage of the Kerala/Chera country.

=== Cheras as Pandya vassals ===
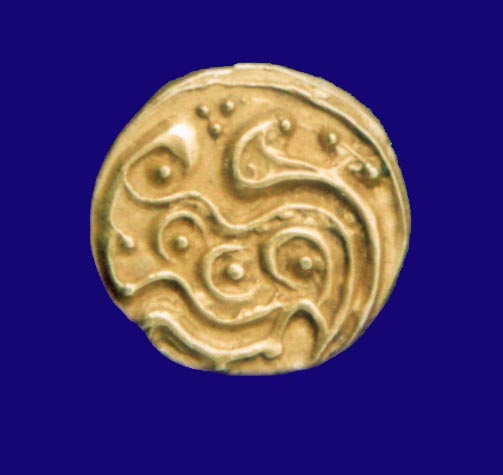
Kongu Chera coin (13th Century AD), Government Museum Chennai

There are clear attestations of repeated Pandya conquests of the Kerala/Chera country in the 7th and 8th centuries AD. Pandya king Sendan or Jayantan (645 – 70 AD) was known as the "Vanavan", an ancient title traditionally associated with Chera rulers. Arikesari Maravarman, another Pandya ruler (670 – 710 AD), likely defeated the "Keralas" or "Cheras" on multiple occasions. It is recorded that the Pandya ruler captured the Kerala/Chera alive, along with his relatives and military contingents. Sources also refer to an engagement between the two kingdoms known as the "battle of Chennilam". His successor, Ko Chadayan "Ranadhira", also made gains against the Cheras.

The so-called "renewal of the capital city of Vanchi (Karur) along with Kudal (Madurai) and Kozhi (Uraiyur)" by Pandya king Rajasimha I (730 – 65 AD), as described in the Madras Museum Plates of Jatila Parantaka Nedunjadaiyan Varaguna (765 – 815 AD), may indicate a Pandya occupation of the Chera capital, Karur. It is recorded that when Jatila Parantaka went to war against the Adigaman ruler of Thagadur (Dharmapuri), the Keralas and the Pallavas came to the latter's aid, though "the Pandyas drove them back to the quarters from which they had emerged" (Madras Museum Plates of Jatila Parantaka, 17th year).

Rashtrakuta inscriptions also mention "an alliance of Dravida kings — including "Kerala", Pandya, Chola and Pallava — who were defeated" (E. I., XVIII). The "Keralas" mentioned in these records may refer to the Chera rulers of Karur, who had already submitted to the Pandyas, rather than the Chera rulers of Kerala.

=== Detachment of central Kerala ===
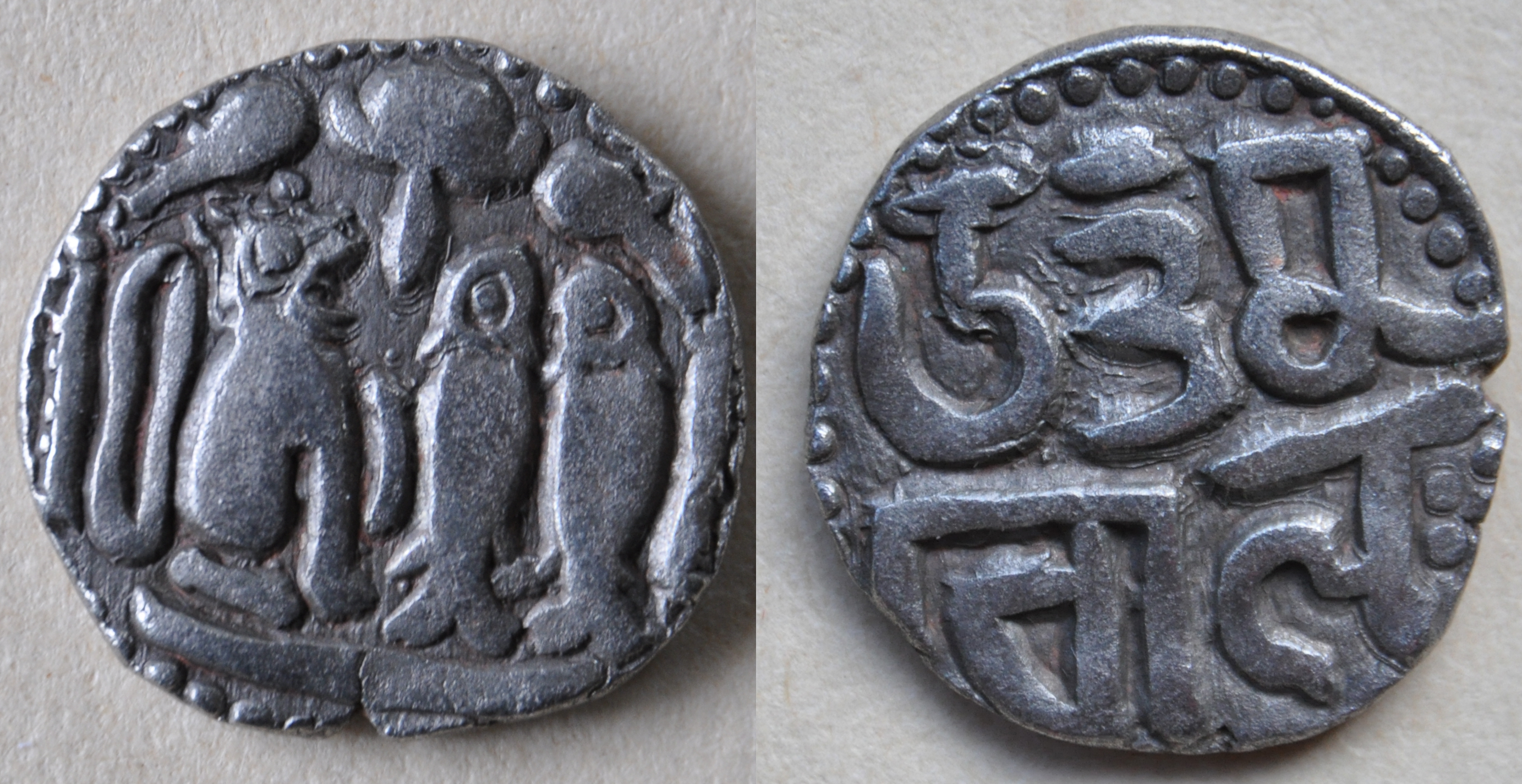
Chola coin of king Rajendra, with legend "Uttama Chola", showing the Chera emblem (Bow, left to the Sitting Tiger).

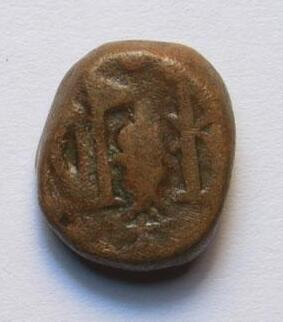
Kongu Chera Coin (13th/14th century CE). Images of bow, hag, fish and palm tree are visible.

As the eastern portions of the ancient Chera country gradually came under the Pandya sphere of influence, the western portion evolved into an independent kingdom with its headquarters at Mahodayapuram-Kodungallur (c. early 9th century AD). Rulers from a branch of the Chera family who survived in the Kongu country as vassals of the Pandyas are described in inscriptions dated to the 9th–11th centuries AD as members of the "Chandra-Aditya Kula" (the Luni-Solar Race). This likely suggests a process of integration with the Pandya royal family (traditionally associated with the Lunar Race) through marriage alliances. The two branches of the Chera family — the Cheras of Karur and the medieval Cheras of Kerala — supported by the Pandyas and the Cholas respectively, were possibly rivals during this period.

The Pandya ruler Parantaka Vira Narayana (c. 880 – 900 AD) is recorded as having married a Chera or "Kerala" (Kongu Chera) princess, "Vanavan Maha Devi". Their son, Rajasimha II, is described in the Sinnamanur Copper Plates as a member of the "Chandra-Aditya Kula". Earlier historians such as K. A. Nilakanta Sastri and Elamkulam P. N. Kunjan Pillai initially assumed that Vira Narayana had married a Chera princess from Kerala; however, this view was later revised by M. G. S. Narayanan.

=== Conquests of Aditya Chola ===
The Kongu country was conquered by the Cholas under Aditya I in the final years of the 9th century AD, likely involving conflict with the Pandya ruler Parantaka Vira Narayana. It is recorded that the Chera ruler of Kerala Sthanu Ravi acted as a junior partner in this Chola campaign in the Kongu country. The Pandyas were eventually defeated in the "great battle" of Sripurambiyam (c. 885 AD). Corresponding marriage alliances between the Chera rulers of Kerala and the Cholas are also recorded in several inscriptions (see Kizhan Adigal).

Pandya king Rajasimha II, who was defeated by Parantaka I, is said to have found asylum in the Chera country or Kerala around 920 AD. It is also recorded that Chola king Sundara (c. 956 – c. 973 AD) had a Chera or Kerala princess among his queens.

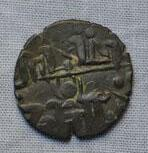
Vira Kerala coin, Napier Museum

=== Under the Chola influence ===
The Kongu Chera country was subsequently conquered by the imperial Cholas (late 10th-early 11 centuries AD).

- "Amara Bhujanga Deva", one of the princes defeated by Chola emperor Rajaraja (as mentioned in the Tiruvalangadu Grant), was likely a Pandya or a Kongu Chera prince. Records from this period also mention a ruler named "Vira Kerala Amara Bhujanga Deva" from the Kongu country.
- Chola ruler Rajadhiraja is known for defeating certain "Vira Kerala", one of the so-called "thennavar muvar", and trampling him to death with his war elephant. This royal figure was probably a Kongu-Chera of the "Chandra-Aditya Kula" or a Pandya prince born of a Pandya royal and a Kongu Chera princess. Vira Kerala was previously thought to be a medieval Chera ruler of Kerala by historians such as K. A. Nilakanta Sastri and Elamkulam P. N. Kunjan Pillai; however, this view was later revised by historian M. G. S. Narayanan.

== Legacy ==
=== Cheras of Thagadur ===
It is recorded that in the late 12th century AD, the Kerala or Chera rulers governed Thagadur (Dharmapuri) in northern Tamil Nadu under the Cholas. In their inscriptions, these rulers describe themselves as descendants of the Adigaman or Satiyaputra Chera rulers of Thagadur.

=== Kongu Cholas ===
A line of independent rulers known as "Kongu Cholas", who bore Chola titles, ruled the Kongu country around the 13th century AD. These rulers were probably members of a collateral branch of the Kongu Cheras or descendants of Chola "viceroys" appointed to the Kongu country.

== Coinage ==
Unlike the medieval Chera rulers of the west coast (Mahodayapuram; Kerala), the Kongu Cheras are known for their distinctive coins.

Silver coins bearing the Nagari legend "sri vira keralasya" (11th–12th centuries AD), found in British Museum and other locations, are generally attributed to the Kongu Cheras. Another coin, known as "anai achu" (the elephant mould"), featuring the bow and arrow symbol, is also believed to be a product of the Kongu Cheras. The anai achu coin was in circulation in western Tamil Nadu and, to some extent, in Kerala in the 12th–13th centuries AD.

== Kongu Chera genealogy ==
Several stone and copper inscriptions of the Kongu Cheras, dated by palaeography to the 9th – 11th centuries AD, have been found in places such as Vellalur, Namakkal, Pazhani, Perur, Dharmapuram, Erode, and Tirukkannapuram in Tamil Nadu. In these inscriptions, they are generally described as members of the "Chandra-Aditya Kula" (the Luni-Solar Race).

Cheras or Keralas
Kongu Chera	Notes
Ravi Kota	Found in an Erode record (Kollam Palayam).; Previously identified as a medieval Chera ruler of Kerala.; Penultimate ruler (Ravi) mentioned in the Namakkal Copper Plates.
Kantan	Son of Ravi Kota.; Father of Kantan Ravi and Kantan Vira Narayana.; Last ruler (Kantan) mentioned in the Namakkal Copper Plates.
Kantan Ravi	Found in two Ponnivadi records.; Ravi, son of Kantan; "Member of the Luni-Solar Race".
Kantan Vira Narayana	Found in a Vellalur record.; Vira Narayana, son of Kantan; Member of the Luni-Solar Race.
Ravi Kantan	Son of Kantan Ravi (found in records from Kiranur, Pazhani and Perur, Coimbatore).
"Vira Chola"	Probably identical with Ravi Kantan, son of Kantan Ravi.; A subordinate of Chola ruler "Parakesari Varma" (identified with Parantaka I).; Names his ancestors - Rama, Mahabahu, Kerala Jagatpati, Manikuttuva, Kota, Ravi and Kantan.; Donor of Namakkal Copper Plates.
Vira Kota	
Vira Chola Kalimurkka	Son of Vira Chola.; Found in two Piramiyam records.
Kalimurkka Vikrama Chola	Son of Kalimurkka.; Found in a Piramiyam record.; Found in a Tingalur record.
Under the Chola Influence
Amara Bhujanga Deva	Probably identical with the Amara Bhujanga Deva defeated by Chola king Rajaraja (Tiruvalangadu Grant).; Probably a Pandya prince.
Vira Kerala Amara Bhujanga Deva	Probably identical with the Amara Bhujanga Deva defeated by Chola king Rajaraja (Tiruvalangadu Grant).; Probably a Pandya prince.
Vira Kerala	Probably identical with the Pandya prince Vira Kerala - one of the so-called "thennavar muvar" (the Three Pandyas). Defeated by Chola king Rajadhiraja (trampled to death by a war elephant).; Probably identical with the Pandya prince "Minavan" Vira Kerala.; Previously identified as a medieval Chera ruler of Kerala.
Kerala Kesari Adhirajaraja Deva	

=== Chera rulers of Thagadur ===
Rajaraja Adigaman Vagan	Dated to 12th century AD
Vitukathazhakiya Perumal	Dated to late 12th century AD.; Subordinate of Kulothunga III.
