= Jayantavarman =

- Vanavan
- Reign: c. 620–650 CE
- Predecessor: Maravarman Avanisulamani
- Successor: Maravarman Arikesari Parankusan
- Dynasty: Pandya

Jayantavarman (r. c. 620–650 CE), known in Tamil as Seliyan Sendan,(Tamil:செழியன் சேந்தன்) was a Pandya ruler of early historic south India. He is best known for extending the Pandya rule to the Chera country (Kerala). He was succeeded by his son Maravarman Arikesari Parankusan.

== Names ==
Jayantavarman (of the Smaller Sinnamanur Plates) is described as Seliyan Sendan in the Velvikkudi Grant. Sendan is the Tamil form of the Sanskrit name "Jayantan". The Velvikkudi Grant uses the Chera title "Vanavan" for Sendan. This probably signifies his victory over a Chera king (or the extension of the Pandya rule to the Chera country).

== Dates ==
- K. A. Nilakanta Sastri (the first assumption) — c. 645–670 CE
- K. A. Nilakanta Sastri (revised date) — c. 654–670 CE
- T. V. Sadasiva Pandarathar — c. 600–625 CE.
- K. V. Raman — ascension year = 653 CE.
- Noboru Karashima — c. 620–650 CE (or) c. 654–670 CE

== Life and career ==
Jayantavarman was the son and successor of Maravarman Avanisulamani. T. V. S. Pandarathar identified him as the king who ruled in Madurai, when the Chinese traveler Xuanzang visited Kanchipuram.

The rock-cut cave temple at Malaiyadikurichi in Tirunelveli district is ascribed to Jayantavarman's reign. This inscription is dated to the 17th regnal year of "Maran Sendan", and states that the cave was excavated by an officer under the royal order. It was discovered in 1959, and is written in mixed Tamil Brahmi and Vatteluttu.

Another inscription ascribed to Jayantavarman was discovered in Vaigai riverbed at Madurai by a washerman, who used it for washing clothes. K. V. Raman noticed it in 1961. This inscription is dated to the 50th regnal year of "Sendan". The Sanskrit portion of this script is written in Grantha script, while the Tamil portion is written in Vatteluttu script. According to this record, Sendan performed several charitable donations (maha-dana) including hiranyagarbha and tulabhara. He commissioned a sluice to the Vaigai river, and named it Arikesariyan (apparently after his heir-apparent Arikesari). He also founded the city of Mangalapura.

The Velvikkudi Grant states that Ko Chadaiyan Ranadhira, a later Pandya king, attacked and defeated certain maharathas (warriors?) at the city of Mangalapura. Historians generally tend to identify Mangalapura with present-day Mangalore. K. V. Raman identifies Mangalapura with modern Mangalam, located on the northern bank of the Kollidam River in Tiruchirappalli district.
