= Velvikudi inscription =

8th-century bilingual copper-plate grant from the Pandya kingdom of southern India

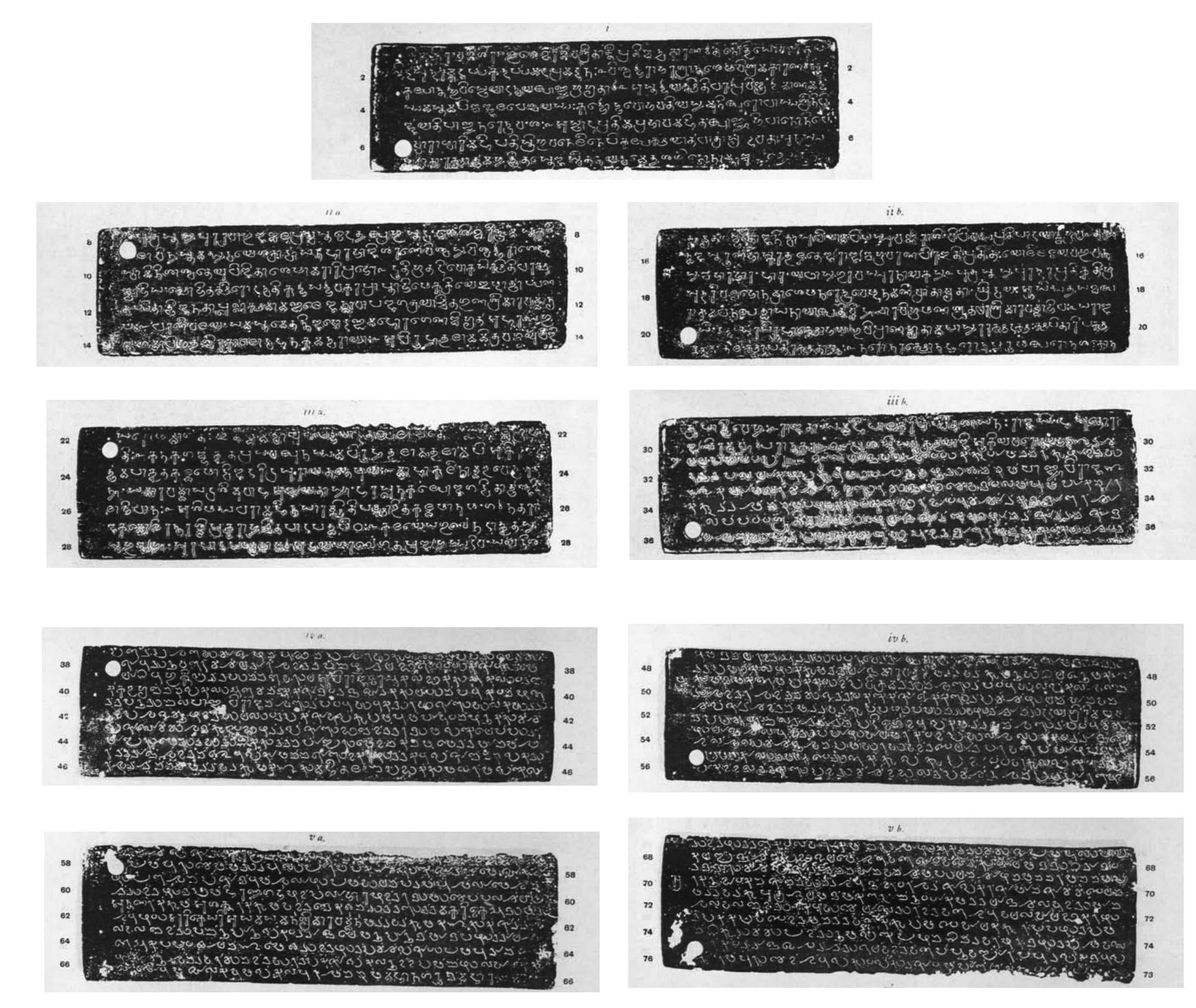
Velvikudi inscription, plate 1

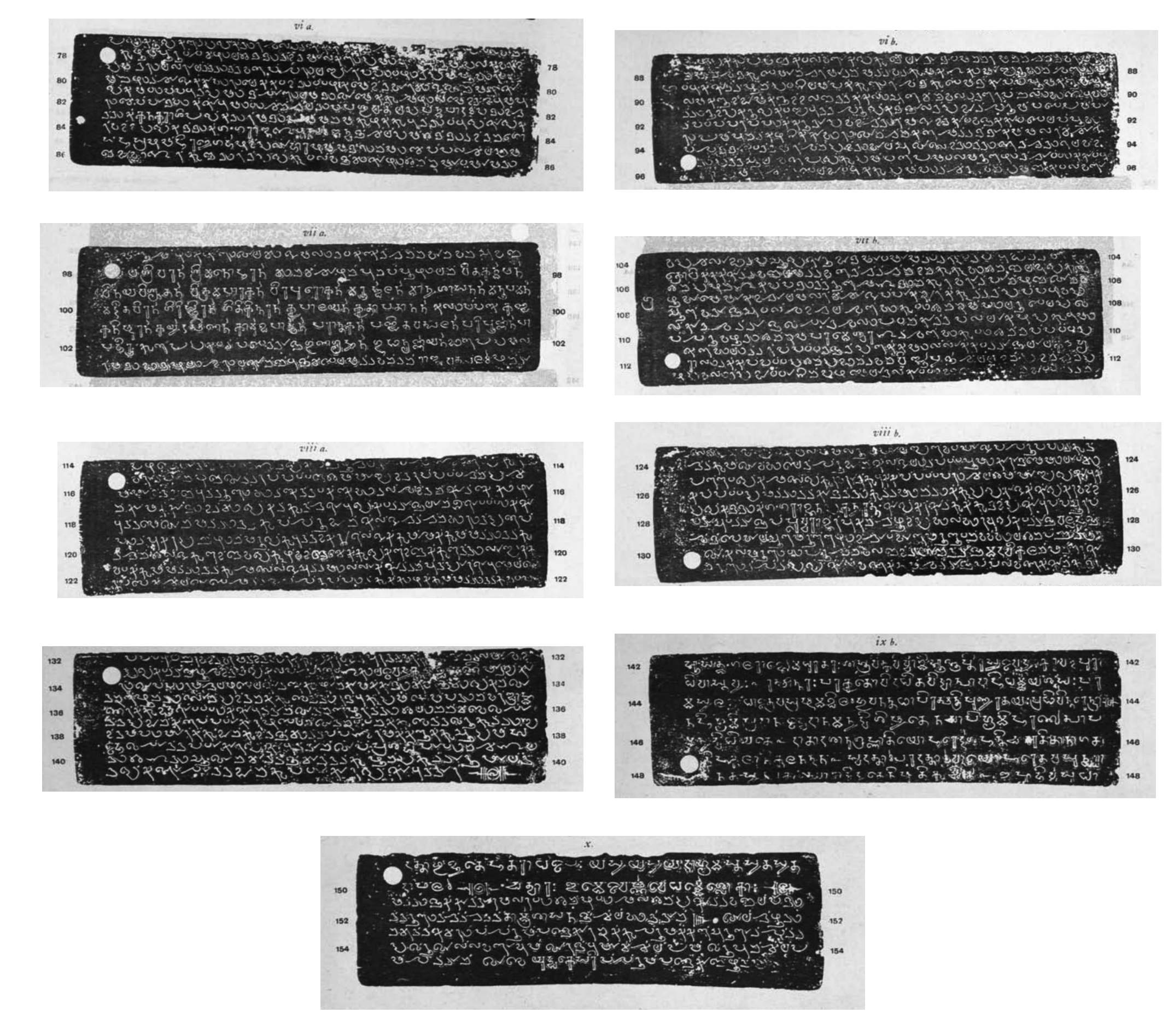
Velvikudi inscription, plate 2

The Velvikudi inscription is an 8th-century bilingual copper-plate grant from the Pandya kingdom of southern India. Inscribed in Tamil and Sanskrit languages, it records the renewal of a grant of the Velvikudi village to a brahmana by the Pandya king Nedunjadaiyan Varaguna-varman I alias Jatila Parantaka (r. c. 768-815 CE) in c. 769-770 CE.

== Date ==
The grant was made in the third regnal year of the king Nedunjadaiyan (also transliterated as Neduncheliyan), whose reign is dated to c. 765-815 CE. The grant recorded in the inscription was probably made in 769-770 CE, but there is some controversy about its actual date.

== Physical features ==
- The record is in form of ten copper plates, each measuring 27.5 x 8 cm.
- The plates are held together by a thin copper ring, without a seal.
- British Museum's Indian Charters on Copper Plates in the Department of Oriental Manuscripts and Printed Books (1975) states that these copper plates were found at Madakulam.

== Language ==
The inscription consists of the Sanskrit language portions inscribed in the Grantha script (lines 1-30 and 142-150), and the Tamil language inscribed in the Vatteluttu script (lines 31-141 and 151-155). The Tamil portion also uses the Grantha script for words of Sanskrit origin, the spelling of these words is sometimes influenced by the rules of Tamil orthography. The sequential numbers on the copper plates are inscribed in the Grantha script.

The Sanskrit portion was composed by Varodayabhatta, who is described as "a performer of all sacrifices" (Sarvakratuyajin). The Tamil portion was composed by Senapati Enadi, alias Chattan Chattan.

The inscription includes the Praśasti (eulogy) portions written in both Sanskrit and Tamil. In the earlier inscriptions from the Tamil-speaking region, issued by the Pallavas, the Praśasti portion is written only in Sanskrit, while the use of Tamil is restricted to the transactional portions. The later inscriptions, issued by the Cholas, also follow the Pallava model. The Velvikudi inscription is the earliest extant inscription that features Praśasti portions written in both Sanskrit and Tamil, a model also followed in other Pandya inscriptions, such as the Larger Chinnamanur (Sinnamanur) inscription and the Dhalavaipuram (Dalavayapuram) inscription. This appears to be the result of the Pandya attempts to raise the status of the Tamil language.

H. Krishna Sastri, who first edited and translated the inscription, suggested that the Sanskrit part may have been added later to give the inscription a "dignified appearance". However, this is unlikely, because similar Sanskrit portions also appear in other near-contemporary Pandya inscriptions. Moreover, the Tamil text of the Velvikudi inscription does not start on a new copper plate, but in the middle of the reverse of the third copper plate. The Sanskrit text that appears at the end of the inscription begins on the reverse of the ninth copper plate, but it is followed by Tamil text starting in the middle of the last copper plate.

== Content ==
=== Sanskrit portion: Mythical genealogy ===
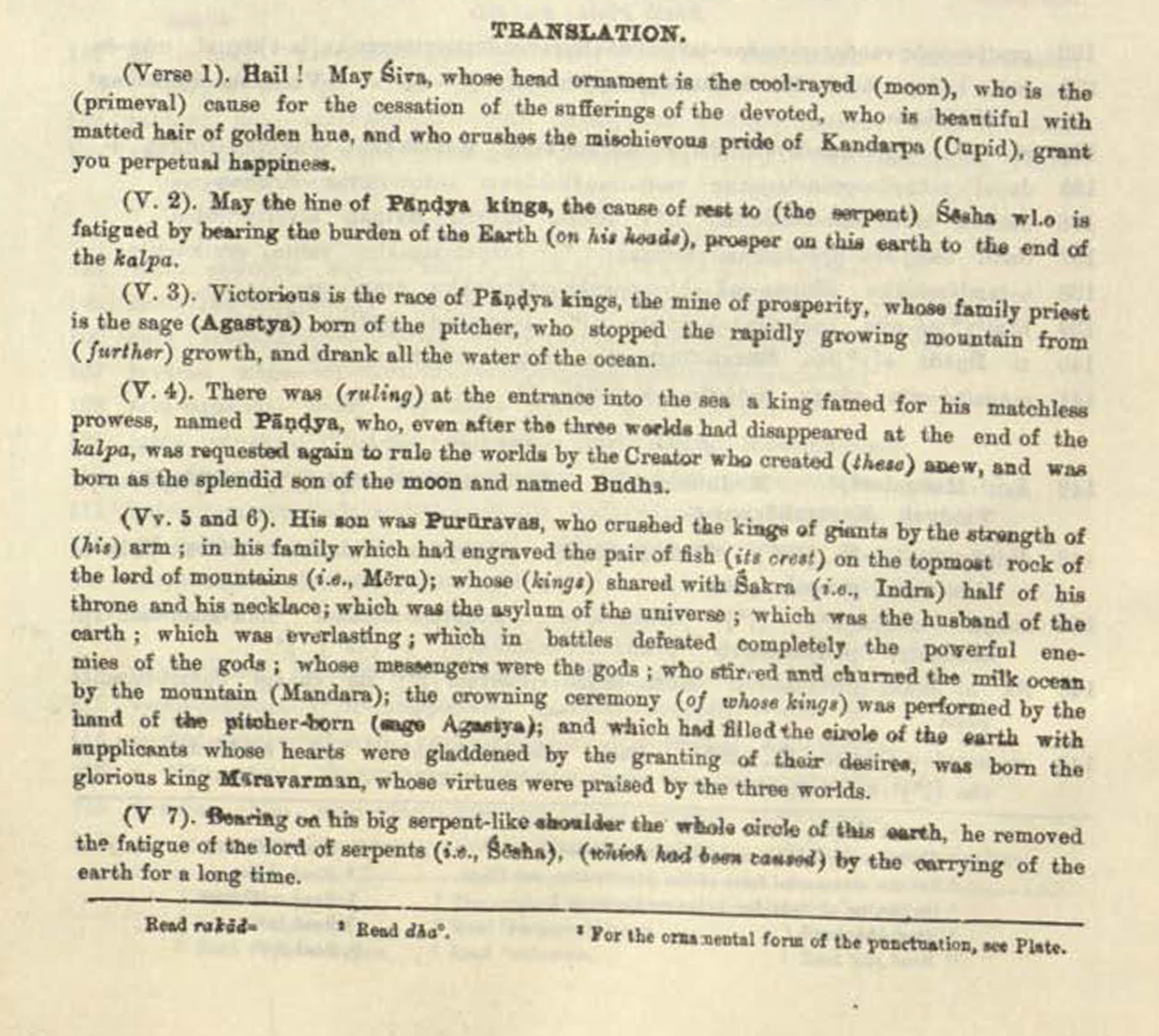
H. Krishna Sastri's translation of the Velvikudi inscription

The inscription begins with a Sanskrit portion that invokes the God Shiva, and describes the mythical lineage of the Pandya kings, naming the sage Agastya as their family priest. It also gives the following account of the dynasty's origin:

At the end of the previous kalpa (age), a king named Pandya ruled the coastal region. At the beginning of the present kalpa, this king was reborn as Budha, the son of the Moon. Budha's son Pururavas introduced the dynasty's emblem - a pair of fish, and shared his throne and taxes with Indra. Pururavas' descendant Maravarman was a patron of the learned, who conquered several enemies and gave away heaps of gold.

Maravarman's son Ranadhira was an able ruler like his ancestors, and Ranadhira's son Maravarman (II) alias Rajasimha was a powerful, prosperous, truthful and learned ruler. The enemy king Pallavamalla ran away from the battlefield when faced with Rajasimha, wondering if the Pandya king was Shiva, Vishnu, or Indra. Rajasimha generously distributed his wealth among the brahmanas, beggars and temples. He married the daughter of the Malava king, and their son was the next ruler, Jatila. (Sastri identified Malava with modern Mala-nadu.) Jatila alias Parantaka was almost equal to Skanda, the son of Shiva.

=== Tamil portion: Historical context ===
The Tamil portion begins with the description of a past event, and goes on to describe the achievements of the issuer king's ancestors:

Narkorran (Tamil Lexicon: Naṟkoṟṟan), a brahmana and a headman of Korkai, completed a Vedic sacrifice at Velvikudi (Vēḷvikkuṭi), with support of the Pandya king Palyaga Mudukudimi Peurvaluti (Palyāka Mutukuṭumi Peruvaḻuti). The inscription defines the boundaries of the Velvikudi village with reference to landmarks such as vegetation, ponds, mounds, and other villages such as Payal and Kulandai; however, the modern identity of Velvikudi is uncertain. Both Korkai and Velvikudi were located in a subdivision called Paganur-kurram, which had fertile agricultural fields. Based on a petition from the brahmanas of the Paganur-kurram, the king granted the village to Narkorran.

Subsequently, a Kali king named Kalabhran (identified with the Kalabhras) conquered the whole Pandya country, including Velvikudi. After some time, the Pandya king Kadungon recaptured his ancestral territory from the enemies. Kadungon's son was Avani Sulamani Maravarman, whose son was Seliyan Vanavan Sendan.

The next king in the line, Arikesari Asamasaman Maravarman, won a battle at Pali by driving into a herd of war elephants; defeated the ocean-like army of Vilveli at Nelveli; destroyed the Paravar who did not seek refuge with him; annihilated the race of the people of Kurunadu; won a battle at Sennilam by driving into a herd of war elephants; defeated the king of Kerala several times at the strongly-fortified town of Puliyur; performed hiranyagarbha and tulabhara gift-giving ceremonies; and protected the brahmanas and the infirm.

Seliyan Sendan's son Sadaiyan (Caṭaiyaṉ), the lord of Konga, bore the titles Tenna-Vanavan, Sembiyan, Solan and Madura-Karunatakan. Sadaiyan won a battle at Marudur; defeated Ayavel in the battles at Sengodi and Pudankodu; and destroyed the maharathis at Mangalapuram. He stamped the symbols of bow, tiger and fish on Mount Meru (these are the symbols of the Chera, Chola and Pandya countries; thus, the inscription suggests that he held supreme authority over the Chera, Chola and Pandya territories).

Sadaiyan's son Ter-Maran defeated the enemies at Neduvayal, Kurumadai, Manni-Kurichchi, Tirumangai, Puvalur, and Kodumbalur. He defeated the Pallava king at Kulumbur, capturing the enemy's elephants and horses. He defeated his enemies at Periyalur, crossed the Kaviri (Kaveri River), and subdued the Mala-Kongam country. He reached Pandi-Kodumudi, and worshipped Pashupati (Shiva). He established a marital alliance with the Gangaraja. He performed the gift-giving ceremonies gosahasra (gift of cows), hiranyagarbha, and tulabhara. He relieved the distress of those who studied the Vedas, and repaired the fortifications at Kudal, Vanji and Kozhi.

Ter Maran's son Parantaka Nedunjadaiyan (the issuer king, also known as Jatila Parantaka) was a respected, merciful and militarily powerful king, who loved the learned people (pandita-vatsala), and equalled Manu. He was like death to his enemies (parantaka), like Partha in wielding the bow, and like Kinnara in music. He defeated the Kadava ruler at Pennagadam, forcing the enemy king to flee to the forest. He also won a battle against the Ay Vel chieftain.

=== Tamil portion: Grant ===
The Velvikudi inscription provides the earliest extant reference to the establishment of a Brahmadeya (land grant to a brahmana) in the Tamil-speaking region. It records Nedunjadaiyan's renewal of a grant made by his purported ancestor, the ancient Pandya king Palyaga Mudukudimi Peurvaluti.

The inscription states that during the third year of Nedunjadaiyan's reign, a man arrived at the Pandya capital Kudal (Kūṭal or Madurai), and complained that Velvikudi had not been returned to Narkorran's descendants after the end of the Kalabhra interregnum. The king asked the complainant to prove the antiquity of the grant, which the complainant did. The king then granted the Velvikudi village to Kamakkani Narchingan (Kāmakaṇi Naṟchiṅgaṉ) alias Suvaran Singan, the headman of Korkai. The headman kept the one-third of the village for himself, and distributed the remaining part among fifty other brahmanas.

=== Sanskrit portion: imprecatory verses ===
The Sanskrit portion at the end names Mangalaraja Madhuratara of Karavandapura as the executor (ajnapti) of the grant. It describes him as a vaidyaka, a master of the shastras, a poet and an orator. This portion ends with four Vaishnavite imprecatory verses (cursing those who violate the grant deed).

=== Tamil portion: Colophon ===
The Tamil portion at the end states that the inscription was engraved by the order of the king himself, and names the engraver as Yuddhakesari (or Chuttakesari) Perumbanaikkaran. The engraver was allotted a house site, a wet field and a dry field.

== Historicity ==
Ignoring the mythical kings, the Sanskrit portion of the Velvikudi inscription mentions three immediate predecessors of the current king Jatila Parantaka (four generations in total). The subsequent Tamil portion mentions six such ancestors (seven generations in total), ignoring the legendary Palyāka Mutukuṭumi Peruvaḻuti. These numbers appear to have been determined by convention: the other near-contemporary inscriptions from the region variously name either four or seven generations of kings.

Genealogy of the Pandya kings
Madras Museum Plates	Velvikudi Grant		Smaller Sinnamanur Plates	Larger Sinnamanur Plates	
Madras Museum Plates	Sanskrit portion	Tamil portion	Smaller Sinnamanur Plates	Larger Sinnamanur Plates	
		Kadungon			
Maravarman Avanisulamani
		Seliyan Sendan (or Sendan)	Jayantavarman		
	Maravarman	Arikesari Maravarman	Arikesari Maravarman	Arikesari Parankusa	
	Ranadhira	Ko Chadaiyan		Jatila	
Maravarman Pallavabhanjana	Maravarman Rajasimha I	Ter Maran (or Maran)		Rajasimha	
Jatilavarman Nedunjadaiyan	Jatila Parantaka	Nedunjadaiyan (=Maranjadaiyan, Anamalai Inscription)		Varaguna Maharaja (Varaguna I)	
				Srimara Srivallabha	
				Varagunavarman II (Varaguna II)	Parantaka Viranarayana
Maravarman Rajasimha II

The inscription presents the issuer king Nedunjadaiyan as a descendant of Palyāka Mutukuṭumi Peruvaḻuti, but this may be a false claim.

The inscription is notable for being one of few early sources that mention the Kalabhras.
