= Maravarman Avanisulamani =

Avanisulamani
- Maravarman
- Reign: c.590–620 CE
- Predecessor: Kadungon
- Successor: Seliyan Sendan (Jayantavarman)
- Dynasty: Pandya
- Father: Kadungon

Maravarman Avanisulamani (IAST: Avaniśūlāmani; r. c. 590–620 CE)(Tamil: அவனி சூளாமணி) was a Pandya ruler of early historic south India. He was the son and successor of Kadungon, who revived the Pandya dynastic power after the Kalabhra interregnum. Not much information is available about either of these kings.

Velvikkudi Grant (a later copper-plate inscription) is the only source information about Avanisulamani. The grant praises the Pandya, claiming that he removed the common ownership of the Earth (by making it his own) and married the goddess of the flower (Lakshmi).

Maravarman Avanisulamani was succeeded by his son Seliyan Sendan (Jayantavarman).

== Dates ==
- K. A. Nilakanta Sastri – c. 620–645 CE.
- T. V. Sadasiva Pandarathar – c. 600–625 CE.
- Noboru Karashima – c. 590–620 CE
