= Maravarman =

Maravarman is a given name. Notable people with the name include:

- Arikesari Maravarman, Pandyan king who ruled the ancient Tamil kingdom between 670 and 710 AD
- Maravarman Kulasekara Pandyan I, Pandyan king, who ruled regions of South India between 1268 and 1308 AD
- Maravarman Rajasimha I, early Pandyan kings
- Maravarman Rajasimha II, the last Pandyan king of the first Pandyan empire
- Maravarman Sundara Pandyan, Pandyan king who ruled regions of South India between 1216 and 1238 AD
- Maravarman Sundara Pandyan II, Pandyan king, who ruled regions of South India between 1238 and 1240 AD
- Maravarman Vikkiraman II, Pandyan king, who ruled regions of South India between 1250 and 1251 AD
