= Vanchi =

Vanchi or Vanji may refer to:

- Vanchi (early historic), the early historic headquarters of the Chera lineage in south India
  - Vanchi Karur, present-day Karur, medieval capital of the Kongu Cheras/Keralas
  - Mahodaya-puram (Makotai) or Vanchi (Thiruvanchikulam), present-day Kodungallur, medieval capital of the Chera/Perumals
- Vanchinathan or Vanchi (1886–1911), Hindu Nationalist
- Vanji language, an extinct Pamir language
