= Kadunkon =

- Pandyadhiraja

King of Pandyan Kingdom
- Reign: c. 560–590 CE
- Successor: Maravarman Avanisulamani
- Died: c. 590 CE
- Issue: Maravarman Avanisulamani
- Dynasty: Pandya
- Religion: Hinduism

Kadunkon or Kadungon was also the name an earlier Pandya king, mentioned in the Sangam literature.

Kadunkon (Tamil: கடுங்கோன்) was a Pandya king who revived the Pandya rule in South India in the 6th century CE. Along with the Pallava king Simhavishnu, he is credited with ending the Kalabhra rule, marking the beginning of a new era in the Tamil speaking region.

Kadunkon's title was "Pandyadhiraja", and his capital was Madurai. He was succeeded by his son Maravarman Avanisulamani.

== Dates ==
Most historians, including R. C. Majumdar, state the period of Kadunkon rule as 590–620. However, a multitude of evidence affirms that Simhavishnu – the Pallava king and Pandya Kadungon had united the Tamil regions, removed Kalabhras and others. Simhavishnu consolidated his kingdom from south of the Krishna river and up to the Kaveri river by c. 575 CE. To the south of Kaveri, the Pandyas came to power. Cholas became subordinates of Pallavas and they were already ruling Telugu region of Rayalaseema. The Kalabhra rule which had dominated the political scene of the Tamil country for few centuries was defeated and ended by the Chalukyas, Pandyas, and Pallavas. This is attested by the numerous inscriptions dated from the 6th century and thereafter, as well as the Chinese language memoirs of the Buddhist pilgrim Xuanzang who visited the Tamil region about 640 CE along with other parts of the Indian subcontinent. Xuanzang describes a peaceful cosmopolitan region where some monasteries with monks were studying Mahayana Buddhism, Kanchipuram was hosting learned debates with hundreds of heretic Deva (Hindu) temples but no Buddhist institutions. Xuangzang makes no mention of the Kalabhras. Historian Noboru Karashima state that kadumkon contemporary to pallava simhavishu that drove out kalabhras in tamil region 575 CE. Dated kadumkon ruled 560 - 590 CE.Noboru Karashima — c. 560–590 CE

- K. A. Nilakanta Sastri (the first assumption) — c. 600–620 CE
- K. A. Nilakanta Sastri (revised date) — c. 590–620 CE
- Noboru Karashima — c. 560–590 CE (or) c. 590–620 CE

== Velvikudi Grant ==
The Sangam literature mentions the early Pandya dynasty, which is believed to have gone into obscurity during the Kalabhra interregnum. The last known king of this dynasty was Ugrapperuvaludi.

Kadunkon is the next known Pandyan king. Not much information is available about him. Most of the knowledge about him comes from the Velvikudi inscription of the Pandya king Parantaka Nedunchadaiyan (also Nedunjadaiyan or Nedunchezhiyan). According to this inscription, Kadunkon defeated several petty chieftains and destroyed "the bright cities of unbending foes". It describes him as the one who liberated the Pandya country from the Kalabhras and emerged as a "resplendent sun from the dark clouds of the Kalabhras". His defeat of Kalabhras (who were probably Jains or Buddhists) was hailed as the triumph of Shaivism.
