= Agatheeswarar Temple, Karur =

Hindu temple in Tamil Nadu, India

Agatheeswarar Temple
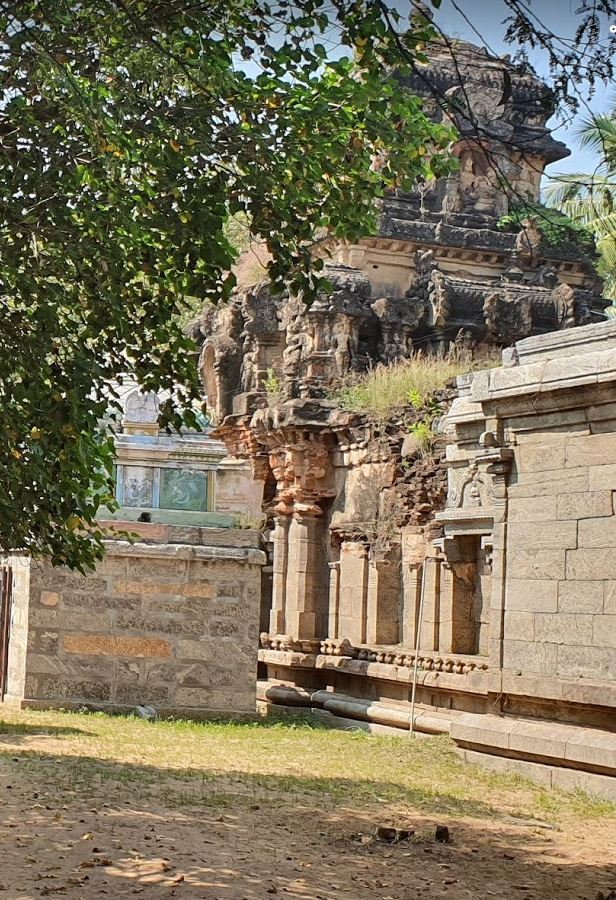

- Location in Tamil Nadu

Religion
- Affiliation: Hinduism
- District: Karur
- Deity: Agatheeswarar (Shiva); Anjanakshi Amman

Location
- Location: Thirumukkudalur, Karur
- State: Tamil Nadu
- Country: India
- Interactive map of Agatheeswarar Temple
- Coordinates: 10.962810989942321°N 78.17863909561548°E

Architecture
- Type: South Indian, Temple

Agatheeswarar Temple is a Hindu temple dedicated to Shiva in Thirumukkudalur village of Karur district, Tamil Nadu, India, around 15 km from Karur. It is on the banks of River Amaravathi, near the confluence of the rivers Cauvery, Amaravathi and Thirumanimuthaaru.

The main deities are Agatheeswarar and Anjanakshi Amman. Other deities include Brahma, Vishnu, Suryan, Chandran, Agoraveerabadrar, Murugan, Valli, Deivanai.

The temple is in ruins.

== History ==
The temple is more than 1000 years old. It is said to have been built by Rajendra Chola I, who ruled from 1014-1044.

== Legend ==
According to the legend, both sage Agasthya and Vaali had wanted to consecrate a Shiva lingam here. Vaali brought a Kashilingam from Kashi. However, before he reached there, Agasthya had already built a Shiva lingam with sand and consecrated it. As a result, Vaali ended up consecrating his lingam across the river at Ayalur (Sriramasamuthiram) where the temple is known as Valeeswarar temple.
