= Marangari =

Marankāri was a minister and military leader of the Pandya kingdom during the early medieval period of South India. He is known from the Velvikudi inscription and other inscriptions, which describe him as a trusted official and commander under a Pandya ruler. He is noted for his participation in the Battle of Venbai.
