= Keralan =

Keralan refers to something from Kerala, India. It may also refer to:

- Keralan cuisine
- Keralan caste system
- Veera Keralan
