= Karur =

- Municipal corporation
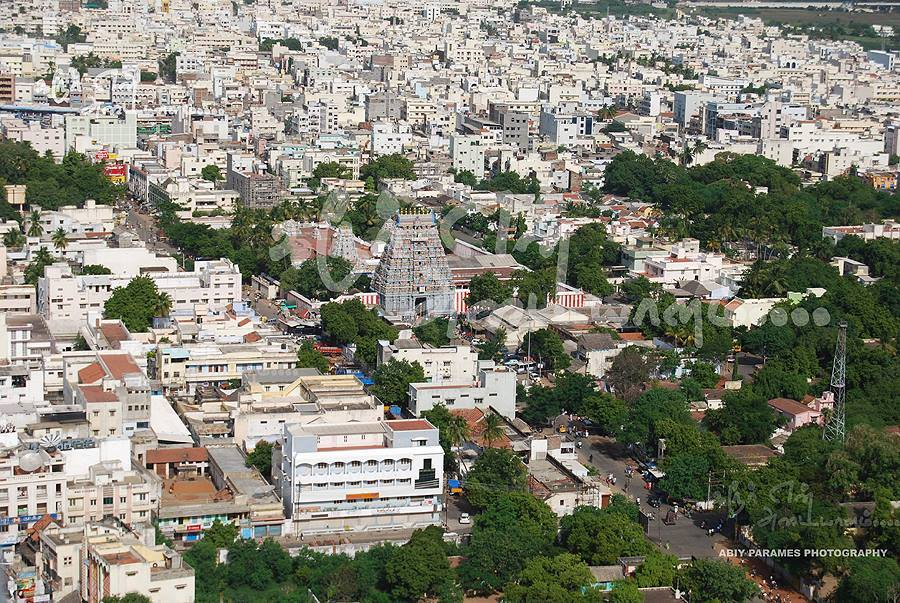

- Karur, Tamil Nadu Karur (India)
- Coordinates: 10°57′36″N 78°4′30″E
- Country: India
- State: Tamil Nadu
- District: Karur

Government
  - Type: Municipal Corporation
  - Body: Karur Municipal Corporation
  - Member of Parliament: Jothimani
  - Member of Legislative Assembly: V. Senthil Balaji
  - Mayor: Kavitha Ganesan

Area
  - Total: 53.26 km^{2} (20.56 sq mi)
- Elevation: 147 m (482 ft)

Population The population as per 2011 census was calculated basis pre-expansion area of 5.96 sq.km. was 70,980. Post expansion of city limits to 52.26 sq.km., the population including the new city limits was estimated to be 394,719 in 2024 by unofficial sources.
  - Total: 394,719

Languages
  - Official: Tamil
- Time zone: UTC+5:30 (IST)
- PIN: 639(xxx)
- Telephone code: 91-(0)4324
- Vehicle registration: TN-47

Karur (Tamil: [kaɾuːɾ]) is a city and municipal corporation in the Indian state of Tamil Nadu. It is the administrative headquarters of Karur district and is administered by the Karur Municipal Corporation. It is located on the banks of the rivers Amaravathi, Kaveri and Noyyal. It is situated at about 395 km (245 mi) southwest of the state capital Chennai.

The region was ruled by the Cheras during the Sangam period and the town might have been part of the Chera capital at Vanchi-Karuvoor. It formed a part of the principal trade route between the west coast and Tamil Nadu. Archeological evidence points to Karur being a centre of trade during the Chera period. The region was ruled later by the Cholas, as evident from temple epigraphs. It was under the control of Pandyas, Vijayanagara Empire and the Madurai Nayaks across various periods in history. In the later part of the 18th century, the region came under the Kingdom of Mysore and the British East India Company annexed it to the Madras Presidency in 1799. After Indian Independence in 1947, it became pert of Madras State, the predecessor of Tamil Nadu.

The economy of the town is dependent on agriculture and textiles. Hindus form the majority of the urban population, with a minor population of Muslims and Christians. Tamil is the major spoken and official language. Karur is a part of the Karur Assembly constituency that elects a member to the Tamil Nadu Legislative Assembly once every five years.

== Etymology ==
The name "Karur" came from Karuvur, the Chera capital of the same name. In Tamil, the name literally means '"embryo town"' (Karu meaning "embryo" and "Oor" meaning "town" or "place"). It is probably derived from the Hindu mythology linked with the creator God Brahma and was earlier referred to as Brahmapuri. In vernacular parlance, the town was referred by names such as Tiruvanilai and Pasupati.

== History ==
Cheras, one of the three kingdoms of the Sangam period (3rd century BC to 3rd century CE), ruled over the region with their capital at Vanchi-Karuvoor. Historians are divided on the exact location of the Chera capital and have opined that it might correspond to either the present day Karur in Tamil Nadu or Kodungalur in Kerala. Karur, which was known as Karuvur, was part of the Kongu Nadu region in the ancient Tamilakam and was one of the oldest inhabited towns in the state. Archaeological excavations from Kodumanal, further along the Noyyal River from Karur, show traces of civilization from 4th century BCE.

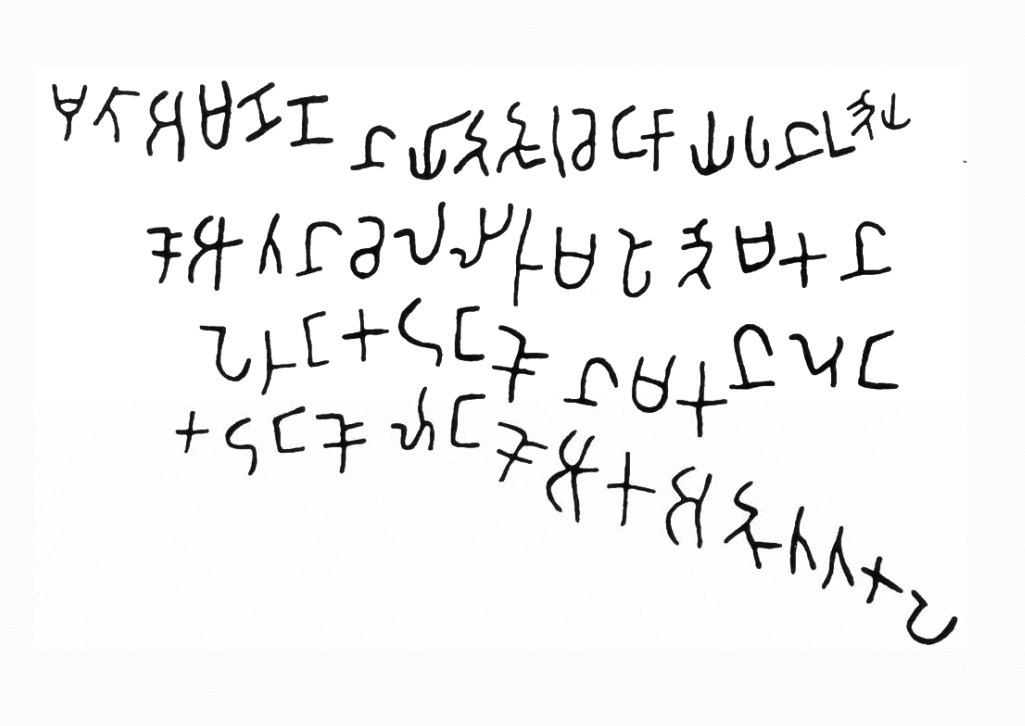
Tamil Brahmi inscription from Pugalur, near Karur

Archeological evidence points to Karur being a centre of trade during the Chera period. The Tamil epic Silapathikaram mentions that the Chera king Senguttuvan ruling from Karuvur. The archaeological excavations undertaken in Karur have yielded pottery, bricks, mud-toys, Roman Amphorae, Rasset coated ware, rings and coins belonging to various eras. Karur might have been the center for old jewellery-making and gem setting, as seen from various excavations. In 150 CE, Greek scholar Ptolemy mentioned "Korevora" as an inland trading center in South India. The region was part of an ancient Roman trade route that extended from Muziris in the west coast to Arikamedu along the east coast of India. Early Tamil Brahmi writings have been found on coins, seals and rings obtained from Amaravati River bed near Karur.

The region came under the influence of the Pandyas during the reign of Arikesari Maravarman in the seventh century CE. Later, the region was ruled by various dynasties such as Rashtrakutas and Western Gangas. The Cholas led by Aditya I, conquered the region in ninth century CE. While the region was directly under the control of the Imperial Cholas till 1064 CE, the Kongu Cholas who were probably vassals or viceroys of the Cholas, ruled the region autonomously later. Temple inscriptions found near Karur dated to the period of Kulothunga Chola I mention the location as Vanchimanagarama Karuvur (Vanchi city of Karuvur).

It was later ruled by the Vijayanagara Empire and the Madurai Nayaks, who were vassals of Vijayanagara earlier. In the latter part of the 17th century, the region came under the influence of the Kingdom of Mysore. In the later part of the 18th century, the place changed hands multiple times between the Mysore Kingdom and the British East India Company. In 1790, the British captured it for the third time and the Karur fort remained as a British garrison until 1801.

Under the British Raj, the region was annexed to the Madras Presidency and served as the headquarters of the sub-collector. The Karur municipality was constituted in 1874. After Indian Independence in 1947, the region was part of the Madras State. After the States Reorganisation Act of 1956, which re-organized state boundaries, majority of the region became part of the new Madras state, which would become Tamil Nadu in 1969.

== Geography ==
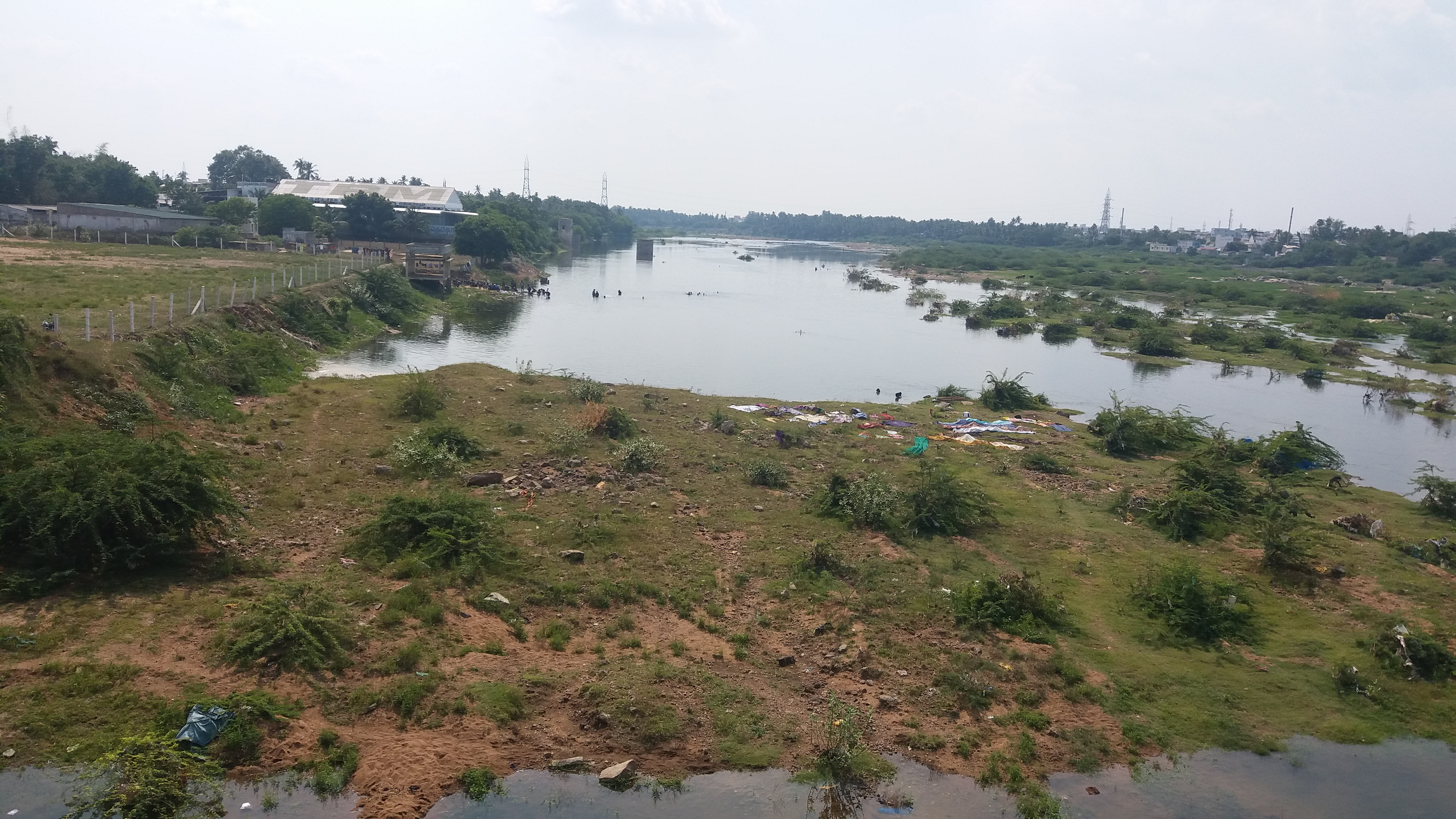
Amaravathi River near Karur

Karur is located at 10.960°N 78.075°E and has an average elevation of 101 metres or 331 feet. The town is located in Karur district, at a distance of 370 km (230 mi) from Chennai. The town is located on the banks of the rivers Amaravathi, Kaveri and Noyyal with a plain topography. There are no notable mineral resources available in and around the town. The soil types are black and red that are conducive for common crops in the Cauvery delta.

=== Climate ===
The climate is hot semi-arid, labelled BSh under the Köppen and Geiger classification system. The temperature ranges from a maximum of 39 °C (102.2 °F) to a minimum of 17 °C (62.6 °F) with an average of 28.7 °C or 83.7 °F. April to June are the hottest months and December to January are the coolest. With an average of 31.5 °C or 88.7 °F, May is the hottest month, whilst the average temperature is 25.6 °C or 78.1 °F in the month of December.

Karur receives an average rainfall of 590 to 600 mm (23 to 24 in) annually, which is substantially below the state average of 1,008 mm (39.7 in). The Southwest monsoon, with an onset in June and lasting up to August, brings scant rainfall to the region as it is situated in the rain shadow region of the Western Ghats. The majority of the rainfall comes from the Northeast monsoon in October-November. Most of the rainfall occurs in October, with an average precipitation of 166 mm (6.5 in) and the driest month is March, with only 8 mm (0.31 in) of rain.

Climate data for Karur Paramathi (1991–2020)
Month	Jan	Feb	Mar	Apr	May	Jun	Jul	Aug	Sep	Oct	Nov	Dec	Year
Record high °C (°F)	35.6 (96.1)	40.0 (104.0)	42.0 (107.6)	45.4 (113.7)	42.0 (107.6)	42.5 (108.5)	39.6 (103.3)	38.8 (101.8)	39.0 (102.2)	38.4 (101.1)	37.2 (99.0)	36.5 (97.7)	45.4 (113.7)
Mean daily maximum °C (°F)	30.5 (86.9)	33.1 (91.6)	36.0 (96.8)	37.0 (98.6)	36.1 (97.0)	33.8 (92.8)	32.7 (90.9)	32.7 (90.9)	33.3 (91.9)	31.4 (88.5)	29.7 (85.5)	29.2 (84.6)	33.0 (91.4)
Mean daily minimum °C (°F)	18.7 (65.7)	20.0 (68.0)	22.5 (72.5)	25.1 (77.2)	25.1 (77.2)	24.8 (76.6)	24.2 (75.6)	24.1 (75.4)	23.9 (75.0)	23.0 (73.4)	21.5 (70.7)	19.4 (66.9)	22.7 (72.9)
Record low °C (°F)	13.4 (56.1)	13.5 (56.3)	15.0 (59.0)	17.6 (63.7)	18.0 (64.4)	20.0 (68.0)	18.6 (65.5)	20.5 (68.9)	19.8 (67.6)	16.4 (61.5)	15.5 (59.9)	13.6 (56.5)	13.4 (56.1)
Average rainfall mm (inches)	1.9 (0.07)	3.8 (0.15)	6.4 (0.25)	35.3 (1.39)	80.5 (3.17)	22.6 (0.89)	23.2 (0.91)	44.2 (1.74)	90.7 (3.57)	124.4 (4.90)	147.7 (5.81)	44.8 (1.76)	625.4 (24.62)
Average rainy days	0.3	0.1	0.6	2.1	4.3	1.4	1.6	3.4	4.7	7.7	7.0	3.2	36.6
Average relative humidity (%) (at 17:30 IST)	51	43	37	40	47	53	58	59	56	65	71	66	54
Source: India Meteorological Department

== Demographics ==
Religious census
Religion	Percent(%)
Hindu	91.41%
Muslim	5.62%
Christian	2.88%
Sikh	0.01%
Buddhist	0.01%
Other	0.07%
No religion	0.01%

As per 2011 census, the population within the pre-expansion area of 5.96 km^{2} (2.30 sq mi) was 70,980. Post expansion of city limits to 52.26 km^{2} (20.18 sq mi), the population including the new city limits was estimated to be 394,719 in 2023. As per 2011 census, the sex ratio was 1,032 females for every 1,000 males, above the national average of 929. About 6,147 were under the age of six including 3,162 males and 2,985 females. Scheduled Castes and Scheduled Tribes accounted for 12.1% and 0.1% of the population respectively. The average literacy rate was 81.7%, higher than the national average of about 73%. The city had a total of 57,687 households. There were a total of 30,216 workers, comprising 125 cultivators, 181 main agricultural labourers, 469 in household industries, 26,660 other workers, 2,781 marginal workers, 24 marginal cultivators, 82 marginal agricultural labourers, 140 marginal workers in household industries and 2,535 other marginal workers.

The population density of the city in the 2001 census was 128 persons per hectare and the average household size was 3.95 as of 2001. Hindus form the majority of the urban population, followed by Muslims and Christians. Tamil is the main language spoken in the city, and the usage of English is common in educational institutions and offices in the service sector.

== Administration and politics ==
Municipal Corporation officials
Mayor	Kavitha Ganesan
Corporation Commissioner	Sudha
Elected members
Member of Legislative Assembly	V. Senthil Balaji
Member of Parliament	Jothimani

Karur is the headquarters of the Karur district. The town was constituted as a municipality in 1874, promoted to first-grade during 1969, selected-grade during 1983 and special-grade in 1988. The Karur Municipal corporation was established in October 2021. It is headed by a mayor, who is elected by the councillors of the 48 wards. The functions of the municipality are devolved into six departments: general administration, engineering, revenue, health, city planning, and IT. All these departments are under the control of a municipal commissioner who is the executive head. The legislative powers are vested with the municipal council.

Karur is a part of the Karur assembly constituency and it elects a member to the Tamil Nadu Legislative Assembly once every five years. The seat has been won by the All India Anna Dravid Munnetra Kazhagam five times, twice by the Dravida Munnetra Kazhagam (DMK), and once by the Indian National Congress. Karur is a part of the Karur (Lok Sabha constituency). From 1957, the seat has been held eight times by the Congress, six times by the AIADMK, and once each by the Tamil Maanila Congress and the DMK.

=== Law and order ===
Law and order is maintained Karur sub division of the Tamil Nadu Police headed by a Superintendent of Police. There are four police stations for law and order, two for traffic and an all women police station. There are special units like prohibition enforcement, district crime, social justice and human rights, district crime records and special branch that operate at the district level, headed by a Superintendent of Police.

=== Utilities ===
Electricity supply to Karur is regulated and distributed by the Karur Electricity Distribution Circle of the Tamil Nadu Electricity Board (TNEB). A Chief Distribution engineer, stationed at the regional headquarters in Karur, is responsible for administration and management. Water supply is provided by the municipal corporation, which operates 58 overhead water tanks that store water pumped from the pumping stations on the Kaveri river. As of 2021-22, 31.97 million litres of water was supplied to households everyday.

As per the municipal data for 2011, about 45 metric tonnes of solid waste were collected every day by door-to-door collection and subsequently the source segregation and dumping was carried out by the sanitary department of the corporation. The coverage of solid waste management in the town by the municipality had an efficiency of 100% as of 2001. As of 2022, the corporation maintained 23 public toilets.

As of 2022, the corporation maintained a total of 88.9 km (55.2 mi) of underground storm water drains, which carry an average of 5.5 million litres of waste water per day. As of 2022, there is one government medical college hospital, one maternity clinic, one municipal Siddha centre, and two primary health centres. As of 2022, the corporation maintained a total of 11,875 street lamps including 3026 LED lamps. The corporation also operates a daily market, two weekly markets and two farmer markets.

== Culture ==
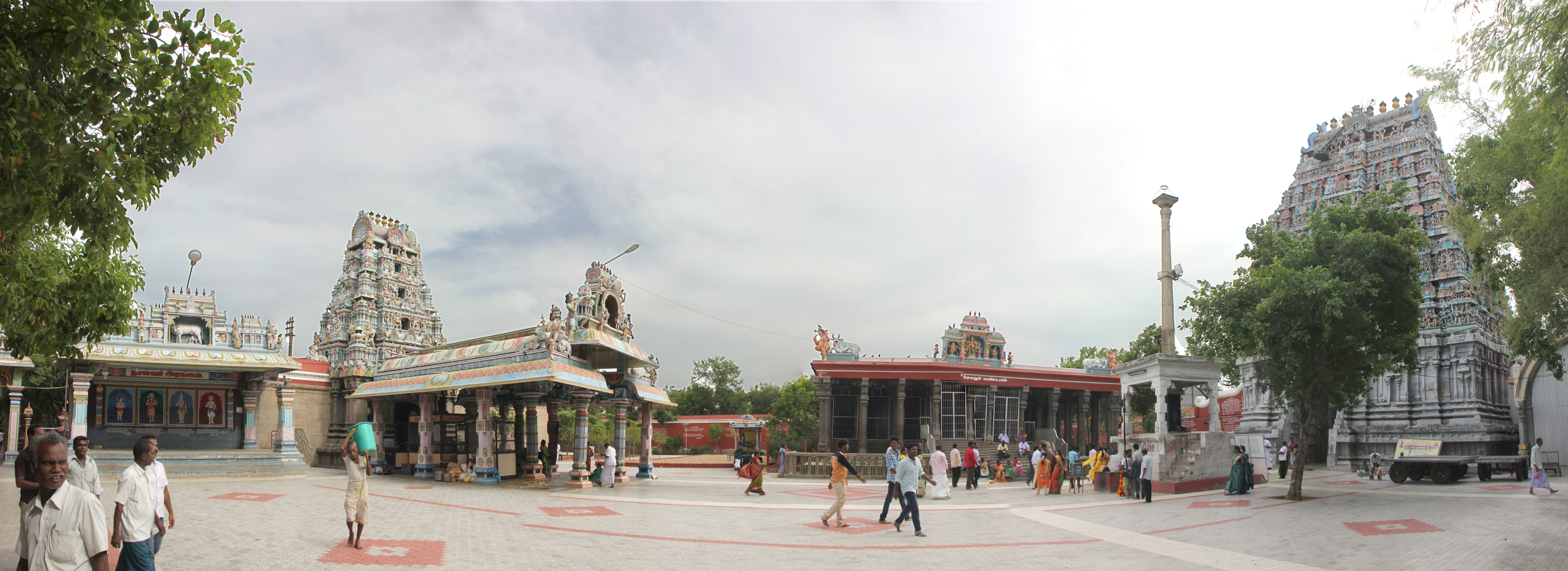
Karur Pasupateeswarar temple

The town formed a part of the traditional Chera and Chola empires and has a number of temples. Karuvurar, born in medieval Karur, was one among the nine who sung the divine composition Thiruvichaippa, the ninth Thirumurai. In addition to the Pasupatheeswarar Siva temple, there is a Vishnu temple at Thiruvithuvakkodu, sung by Kulasekaraazhvaar (7th-8th century CE) and presumably mentioned in epic Silappadikaram as the temple where Cheran Senguttuvan sought blessings before his north Indian expedition.

== Economy ==
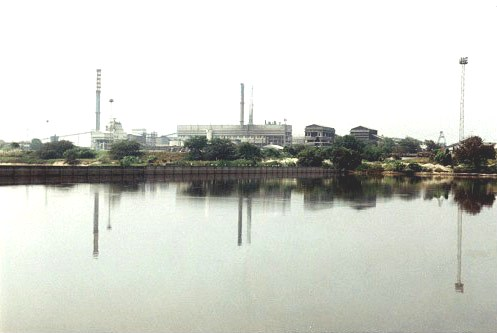
TNPL paper mill in Karur

The city has about 19% of its total area under agricultural land use. The major crops are rice, cotton, sugarcane and oil seeds, while the major horticultural crops are coconut, banana, betel and mango. The town is the commercial centre for trading of agricultural commodities from the nearby towns and villages. Approximately 80% of the workforce is employed in tertiary sector, 17% in primary sector and 4% in secondary sector activities. Several banks have branches in the town with private banks Karur Vysya Bank and Lakshmi Vilas Bank have their headquarters in Karur.

Textiles is a major industry with various allied industries like ginning and spinning mills, dyeing factories and weaving. As of 2005, the industry had revenues of ₹20 billion (US$210 million) annually. Karur is also home to an integrated textile park.

The town is a major hub for coach building, with a major share of bus coaches being built here locally. About 2000 units were engaged in making High-density polyethylene (HDPE) mono filament yarn and associated products. TNPL promoted by the Government of Tamil Nadu is located near Karur and is one of the largest producers of paper in India. Bharat Petroleum operates a pipeline from Kochi to Karur for transporting petroleum products. The petroleum products received at the terminal in Athur is transported to other districts of Tamil Nadu through tanker trucks. Chettinad Group operates a wet process cement plant at Puliyur near Karur.

== Transport ==
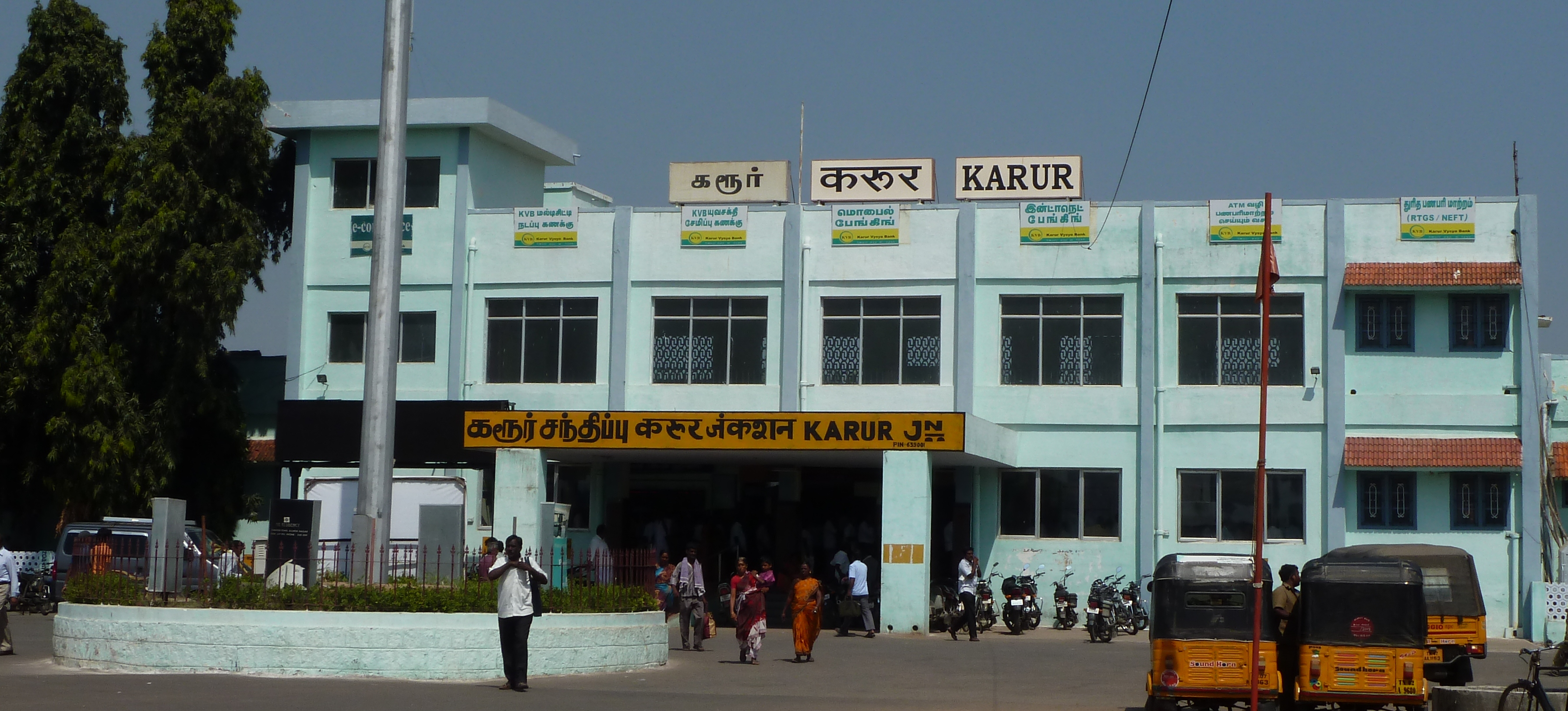
Karur railway station

The corporation maintains 412.24 km (256.15 mi) of roads including 55.2 km (34.3 mi) concrete roads, 79.33 km (49.29 mi) gravel roads and 275.3 km (171.1 mi) bituminous road. A total of 8.375 km (5.204 mi) of state highways is maintained by the State Highways Department and 26.69 km (16.58 mi) of national highways by the national highways department. There are two national highways namely the NH 44 and NH 67 that pass via Karur. Karur bus stand is located near the center of the town. The State Express Transport Corporation operates long-distance buses to other cities. Tamil Nadu State Transport Corporation operates city and moffusil busses from Karur to other parts of Tamil Nadu and neighbouring states. Karnataka State Road Transport Corporation and Kerala State Road Transport Corporation also operates few buses to Karnataka and Kerala respectively.

Karur Junction railway station (station code - KRR) is one of the railway junctions under the Salem division of the Southern Railway zone of the Indian Railways network. It has five active Platforms and forms the intersection between Erode–Tiruchirappalli line and Salem-Karur line. The nearest airport is the Tiruchirapalli International Airport, located 78 km (48 mi) away.

== Education ==
There are 10 government schools including four primary schools, four middle schools and two higher secondary schools. There are several institutes of higher education in the town. Karur medical college was established in 2019.

== See also ==
- 2025 Karur crowd crush
