= Battle of Venbai =

- Part of Pandya–Chalukya conflicts
Date	c. 8th century CE (c. 750 CE)
Location	Venbai (on the banks of the Kaveri River, South India)
Result	Decisive Pandya victory

Belligerents
Pandya Kingdom	Chalukya Empire; Western Ganga Dynasty

Commanders and leaders
Maravarman Rajasimha I Marangari	Kirtivarman II; Sripurusha

Strength
Unknown	Unknown

Casualties and losses
Unknown	Unknown

The Battle of Venbai was a military engagement fought in the 8th century CE between the Pandya kingdom under Maravarman Rajasimha I and the Chalukya ruler Kirtivarman II, along with his Western Ganga ally Sripurusha. The battle, fought on the banks of the Kaveri River, resulted in a defeat for the Chalukya–Ganga forces and contributed to the expansion of Pandya influence into the Kongu region and adjoining areas of the southern Chalukya territory.

== Background ==
During the reign of Maravarman Rajasimha I, the Pandya kingdom expanded into the Kongu region, bringing it into conflict with the Chalukyas of Vatapi and their ally, the Western Ganga ruler Sripurusha. The Chalukya king Kirtivarman II, along with his Ganga feudatory, opposed the Pandya advance into territories adjacent to the Ganga kingdom.

== Battle ==
The conflict culminated in a major battle at Venbai, located on the banks of the Kaveri River. Maravarman Rajasimha I is said to have crossed the Kaveri and engaged the combined forces of Kirtivarman II and Sripurusha. According to historical accounts, the Chalukya forces and their Ganga ally were defeated in the battle. Marangāri was a minister and military leader of the Pandya kingdom during the early medieval period of South India. He is known from the Velvikkudi copper plates and other inscriptions, which describe him as a trusted official and commander under a Pandya ruler. He is noted for his participation in the Battle of Venbai.

== Aftermath ==
Following the battle, the Pandya ruler Maravarman Rajasimha I strengthened his position in the Kongu region and adjoining areas. The defeat of the Kirtivarman II and his Western Ganga ally Sripurusha is described in sources as a significant setback, weakening their influence in the region. Some accounts also suggest that a Ganga princess was given in marriage to a Pandya prince, possibly as part of a political settlement following the conflict.
