= Varagunavarman l =

Varagunavarman I
- Tenna vanavan, Sinacholan
- Reign: c. 765 – 815 CE
- Predecessor: Maravarman Rajasimha I
- Successor: Srimara Srivallabha
- Dynasty: Pandya
- Religion: Hinduism

Varagunavarman l (also known as Jatila Parantaka Nedumchadayan; r. c. 765–815 CE) was a Pandya ruler of South India noted for his long reign and military activity. Inscriptions attribute to him successes against the Pallavas, including the capture of parts of their southern territories, and the extension of Pandya influence across the Tamil region, Kerala, and Kongu Nadu, Chola nadu, Thondainad .He is also associated with the Velvikkudi copper-plate grant, and numerous inscriptions from his reign have been identified, suggesting one of the longest reigns among the Pandya rulers.

== Military campaigns ==
Around 767 CE, the Pallava king Nandivarman II was defeated in a battle at Pennagadam, located south of the Kaveri River, by Varagunavarman l, as recorded in the Velvikkudi copper plates. These inscriptions further state that Parantaka went on to defeat Ay Vel, the chief of the Podiyil hills, Adigaman of Tagadur, and the Kurumbas in the Kongu region.He dedeated Ay vel in the Battle of Nattukkurumbu driving away the Ayvell and the Kurumbas to the forest.

Additionally, according to the Sivaramangalam copper plates, Parantaka destroyed his enemies in battles fought at Vellur, Vinnam, and Sezhiyakkudi. On the northern bank of the Kaveri River, at places such as Ayiraveli, Ayirur, and Pugaliyur, he is said to have defeated Adigaman of the Adigaman lineage. It is also mentioned that a Chera king and a Pallava king came to the aid of Adigaman, but Parantaka drove them away.

Furthermore, Parantaka is described as having defeated the Kongu ruler, captured Puhar (or Puhar-related territory), subdued the Kongu country, destroyed Vizhinjam, and captured the Venadu king. He is said to have seized elephants, horses, and immense wealth from that kingdom, and after subduing his enemies at Vellur, brought the entire southern region under his control.

=== Campaigns against the Pallavas ===
Varaguna I is associated with conflicts against the Pallavas. Inscriptions attribute to him victories in battles such as those at Karuvur and Pennagadam. According to some sources, he defeated Nandivarman II at the Battle of Pennagadam around 767 CE. He is also described as having defeated the Pallava ruler Dantivarman and capturing the southern parts of the Pallava territory. These campaigns indicate sustained military engagement between the Pandyas and Pallavas during his reign.

=== Conflict with Pallava Kongu and Chera Allied Forces ===
Varaguna I is described in inscriptions as having faced a confederacy comprising the Pallavas, the Chera dynasty, and the chiefs of Kongu Nadu. Engagements at Ayiraveli, Ayirur and Pugaliyur are attributed to this phase, where he is said to have defeated the combined forces of these powers, and captured war materials, including chariots and horses. He also conducted campaigns in Kongu Nadu, where, according to inscriptional records, he defeated the Kongu ruler (Adigan) and captured him. This successful Campaigns against Pallava allies, Pandya king Varaguņa varman l reach the heart of the Pallava region basing a military camp close to Pallava capital Kanchipuram. This campaign led by Nandivarman II represent a Failer to save southern region of Pallavas. He unable to recover his territory.

=== Battle of Nattukkurumbu ===
Jatila Parantaka (identified with Varaguna Varman I in some historical interpretations) is described in Epigraphia Indica (Vol. 17) as having fought against the Āy chiefs and the Kurumbas at Nattukkurumbu. The record states that he defeated these groups and drove them into forest regions.

=== Kerala Campaign ===
Varaguna I (also known as Parantaka Nedumchadayan) is described in inscriptional sources, including the Museum plates, as having campaigned against the ruler of Venad (in present-day southern Kerala). These records state that he defeated the Venad king and annexed his territory, capturing elephants, horses, and other treasures. The campaign is also associated with the attack on the fortified port of Vilinam (Vizhinjam), which is described as having been destroyed by Pandyan forces. The port is portrayed in the sources as an important emporium that was subject to repeated attacks, including in later centuries by the Cholas.

=== Extent of the Pandya kingdom ===
No records of military campaigns undertaken after the twenty-seventh regnal year of Varaguna I are known. However, inscriptions attributed to later regnal years (such as those found at Kalugumalai and Ervadi) suggest that he may have ruled for nearly fifty years. Based on inscriptional evidence, his reign is associated with a significant expansion of Pandya authority. His control is described as extending beyond Tiruchirappalli into regions corresponding to present-day Thanjavur, Salem, Coimbatore Thondainad (Kanchi surrounding areas), in addition to territories in Kongu Nadu and Venad. These developments are presented in the sources as marking a period of territorial consolidation and expansion for the Pandya kingdom.
