= Arikesari Maravarman =

Arikesari
- Maravarman
- Reign: c. 640–670 CE
- Predecessor: Seliyan Sendan (Jayantavarman)
- Successor: Ko Chadaiyan Ranadhira
- Dynasty: Pandya

Arikesari Maravarman c. 640–670 CE also known as Parankusa, was a Pandya king of early medieval south India.

Arikesari's reign witnessed the beginning of the Pandya contesting with the Pallavas in the northern part of the Tamil country. He probably entered into an alliance with Chalukyas (to the counter the Pallavas). However, historian K. M. Venkata Ramaiah notes that Arikesari Maravarman later defeated the Chalukyas under Vikramaditya I at the battle of Nelveli, indicating that Pandya–Chalukya relations were not consistently allied. The Pandyas also fought with the Cheras ("Keralas") under his rule.

== Period ==
Arikesari Maravarman was the successor of Seliyan Sendan (Jayantavarman), but it is not known for certain if he was Jayantavarman's son or not (most probably his son).

- K. A. Nilakanta Sastri (the first assumption) - c. 670–710 CE
- K. A. Nilakanta Sastri (revised date) - c. 670–700 CE
- T. V. Sadasiva Pandarathar - c. 640–670 CE
- Noburu Karashima - c. 650–700 CE (or) c. 670–700 CE
- V. Vedachalam & A. Kalavathi - c. 640–690 CE

He was succeeded by his son Kocchadaiyan Ranadhira.

== Names ==
In the Velvikkudi Grant and the Smaller Chinnamanur Plates, his name appears as "Arikesari Maravarman". In the Larger Chinnamanur Plates, he is called "Arikesari Parankusa".

== Life and career ==
=== Velvikkudi Grant ===
The reign of Arikesari Maravarman probably saw a significant increase in the Pandya political power and prestige.

According to the Velvikkudi Grant, Arikesari Maravarman won battles at Pali, Nelveli, and Uraiyur. In Nelveli, he is said to have conquered the vast forces of certain Vilveli. The victory at Nelveli is confirmed by the Larger Sinnamanur Plates. Except Uraiyur (Tiruchirappalli), the identity of these places is not certain. E. Hultzsch tentatively identified Nelveli with modern Tirunelveli, but K. A. N. Sastri disagreed with this identification.

=== Larger Chinnamanur Plates. ===
The Larger Chinnamanur Plates states that Arikesari "Parankusa" won battles at Nelveli and Sankaramangai.

According to the Chinnamanur copper plates, Arikesari Maravarman is credited with defeating the Pallavas at the battle of Sankaramangai.

The inscription further states that he ruined the Paravars (people on the south-east coast of the Pandya country) who did not submit to him and destroyed the people of Kurunadu. According to one theory, "Kurunattar" refers to people of Kurunadu (an unidentified place); another possibility is that the term refers to petty chieftains.

Arikesari is also said to have defeated an unspecified enemy at Sennilam, which may refer to a particular place or is a generic term for "Red (Bloody) Battlefield". Finally, the inscription states that he defeated the Keralas (the Cheras) multiple times, battle of Puliyur he defeated Cheras and once imprisoned their king with his near relatives and warriors.

=== Role in the Chalukya-Pallava-pandya conflicts ===
Arikesari Maravarman seems to have joined with the Chalukyas in their struggle against the Pallavas. Early in the rule of Pallava king Parameswara I, Chalukya Vikramadtiya I advanced south and even displaced the Pallava from his capital Kanchi. The Chalukya king then advanced further south to the Kaveri River and encamped at Uraiyur (where he probably effected an alliance with Arikesari Maravarman). However, other historians note that the relationship between the Pandyas and the Chalukyas was not consistently allied. K. M. Venkata Ramaiah records that at the battle of Nelveli the Pandya forces defeated the Chalukyas under Vikramaditya I, forcing the Chalukyan army to retreat. The retreating forces later encountered the Pallavas at Peruvallanallur, where they were again defeated. This sequence suggests shifting hostilities rather than a stable Pandya–Chalukya alliance.

=== Literary sources ===
Commentary to the Iraiyanar Ahapporul mentions a king named Arikesari, with titles Parakusan and Nedumaran among others. The commentary also mention several battles, at Pali, Sennilam and Nelveli and at Vizhinjam, some of which the scholars do not read in epigraphy till late 8th century.

Based on this, historian Venkayya assumed that the two rulers are identical. However, K. A. N. Sastri rejected this identification on the basis that "a rhetorical work like this took for its hero, a saintly king of legendary fame, and attributed to him all the achievements of the Pandyan lines of kings that the author could think of his day".

== Religion ==
Arikesari is known to have performed the Hiranyagarbha and Tulabhara rituals (a number of times).

=== Identification with Nedumaran ===
Arikesari Maravarman is sometimes identified with the Pandya king Nedumaran or Koon Pandya, who converted from Jainism to Hinduism under the influence of the Bhakti Shaivite Saint, Sambandar. Koon Pandiyan was thence regarded as a Saint himself. The legend is considered as an expression of the historical consciousness (signifying the loss of Jain political influence in the Tamil country).

According to this legend, Koon Pandiyan had married the Chola princess, Mangayarkkarasi, who is also a Shaivite Saint.
