= Vitukathazhakiya Perumal =

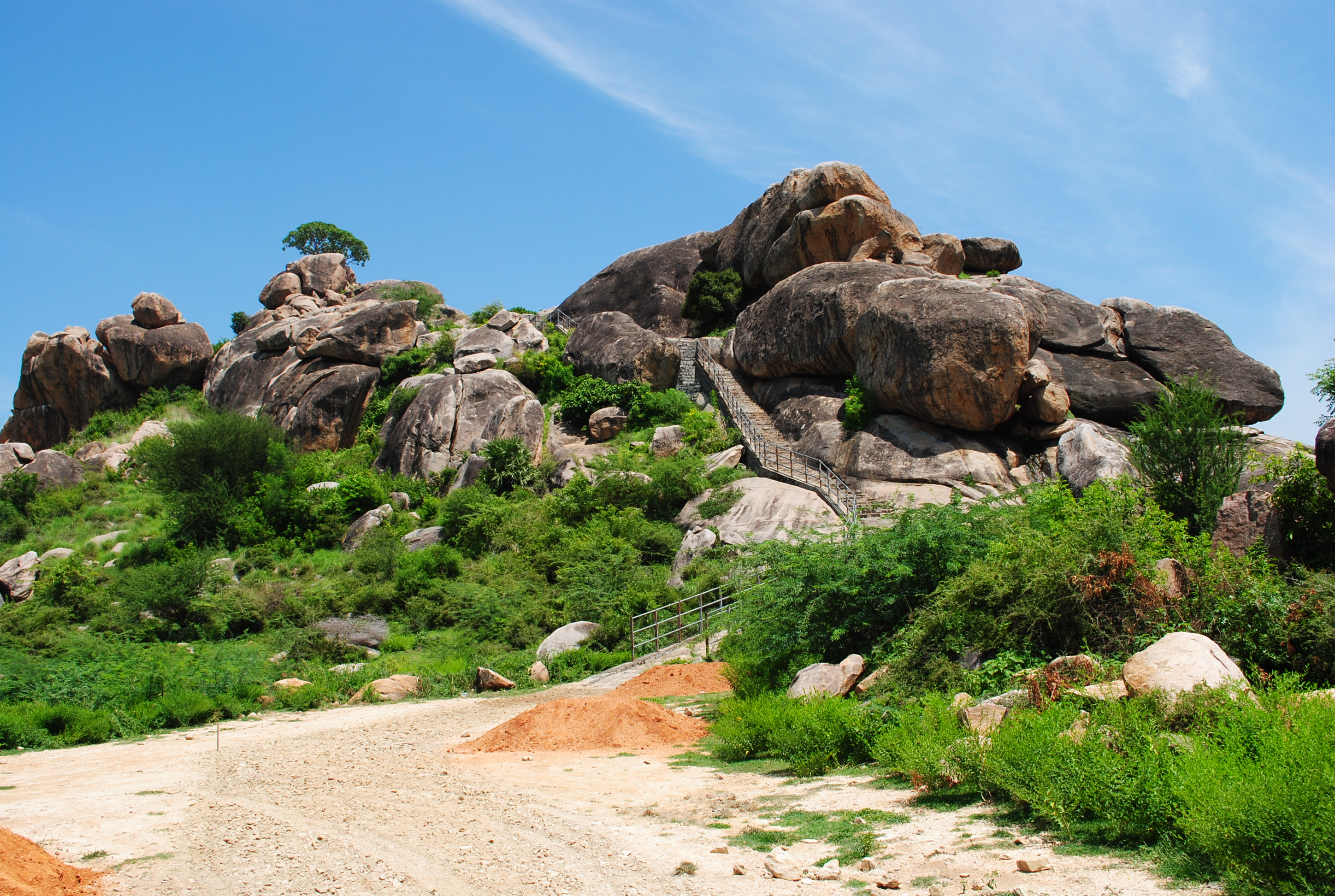
- Jain Temple on the Tirumalai Hill

Satiyaputra Chera ruler of Thagadur
- Reign: Late 12th century AD
- Predecessor: Rajaraja Adigaman Vagan
- House: Chera (Kerala)/(Adiyaman) Satiyaputra
- Religion: Hinduism

Rajarajadevan Vitukathazhakiya Perumal (fl. late 12th century AD), also known as Vyamukta Sravanojjvala in Sanskrit, was an Adigaman Chera ruler of Thagadur (modern Dharmapuri) in northern Tamil Nadu, southern India under Chola monarch Kulothunga III. He was a contemporary of Sengeni Ammaiyappan Hastimalla alias Vikrama Chola Sambuvarayan and Seyyagangar/Siyagangan, both also subordinates of Kulothunga III. Vitukathazhakiya is said to have ruled over the three rivers — Pali (Palaru), Pennai (Southern Pennaru) and Ponni (Kaveri).

He is described as the son of a certain Rajaraja Adigaman Vagan (Sanskrit: Adhika, also Satiyaputra). Vitukathazhakiya is noted for having repaired the Jain Temple on Tirumalai Hill, originally associated with his remote ancestor Ezhini. He reinstalled the images of the Yaksha and Yakshi, ancient donations made by Ezhini, an Adigaman of the Chera (Sanskrit: Kerala) family. He also donated a gong and commissioned a water channel connected to the "Kadapperi" tank.

Ezhini (Sanskrit: Yavanika) is described as "the king of Keralas" (Tamil: Chera) and "the chief of the family ruling over Vanchi" in inscriptions. Tirumalai Hill is referred to as the Holy Mountain of the Arhat in "Tondai Mandalam". Yavanika is the Sanskrit equivalent of the Tamil term "Ezhini" (meaning "curtain" in Tamil). "Vya-mukta Sravana-ujjvala" is likewise the Sanskrit approximate of the Tamil title "Vitu-kathu-azhakiya".

== Inscriptional records ==
- Painted Cave, Tirumalai, near Polur, North Arcot District (two inscriptions) [bilingual, Tamil and Sanskrit]
- Sengama, Tiruvannamalai Taluk, South Arcot District (two inscriptions)
