= Pasupateeswarar Temple, Karur =

Temple in Tamil Nadu, India

Pasupateeswarar Temple
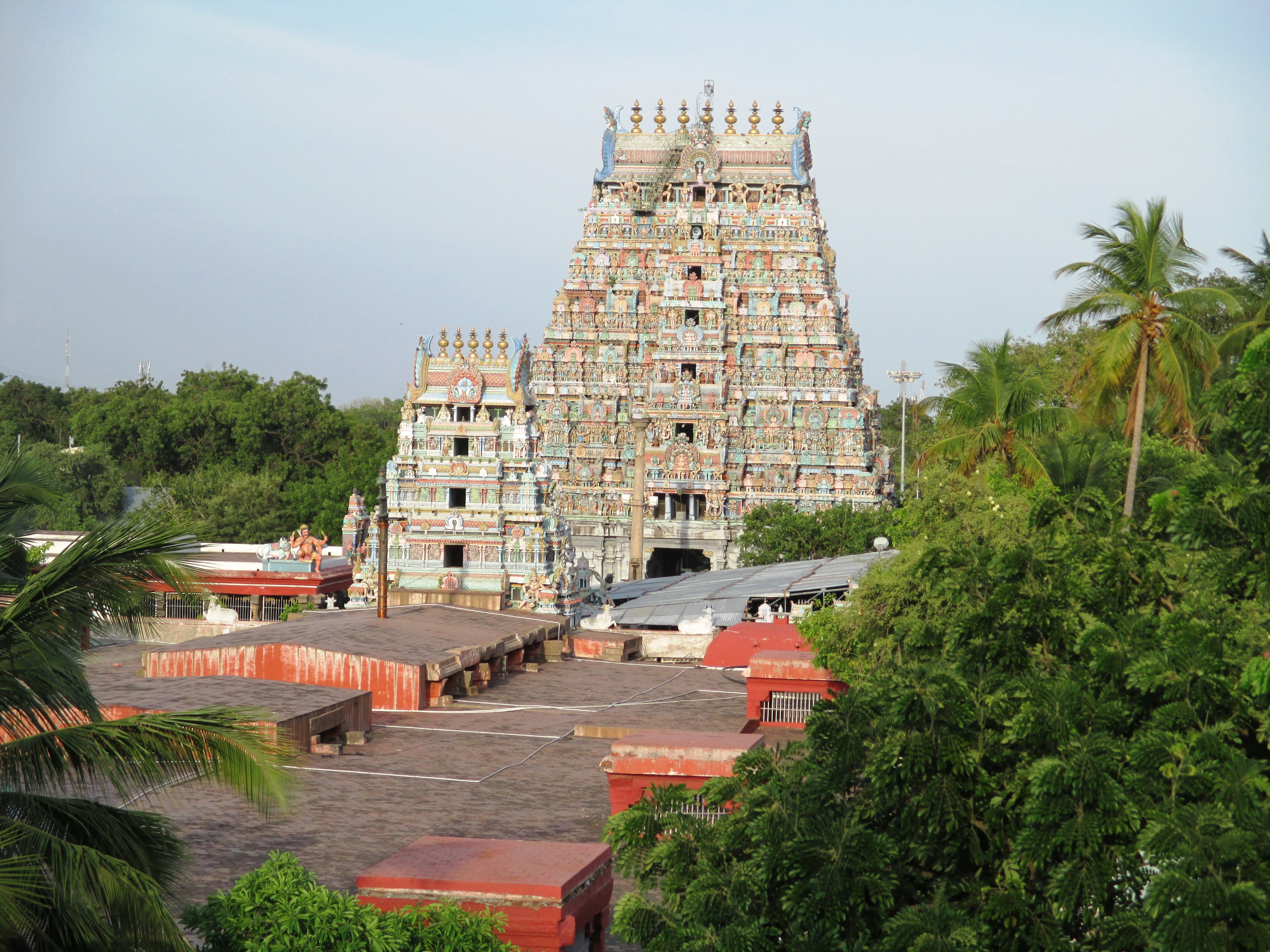

- Pasupateeswarar Temple, Karur, Tamil Nadu

Religion
- Affiliation: Hinduism
- District: Karur district
- Deity: Pasupatheeswarar (Shiva)
- Festival: Maha Shivaratri

Location
- Location: Karur
- State: Tamil Nadu
- Country: India
- Coordinates: 10.9606°N 78.0785°E

Architecture
- Type: Dravidian architecture

Specifications
- Temple: One
- Elevation: 175 m (574 ft)

Pasupateeswarar temple, Karur is located in Karur and is one of the seven Sivastalams. This city was called karuvoor during the time of Sambandar's visit to this temple. From the inscriptions so far deciphered, it is clear that the temple existed during the reign of the king Rajendra Chola (1012-54 CE) since he gifted land to this temple. For the Kongu Cholas and Kongu Pandyas, the temple was a favourite and, it the drew undivided attention of the Vijayanagar rulers too.

== Legend ==
Legend says that Kamadhenu, the mythological cow, meditated upon Siva to receive his blessings and the name Aanilai. Brahma is said to have worshipped the presiding deity here. Thus the Sthala Theertham is called the Brahma Theertham. Since Kamadhenu, the cow (locally call Pasu) worshipped the presiding deity, Shiva came to be known as Pasupatheeswarar.

== Architecture ==
This Shivasthalam is situated 79 miles (127 km) by road from Coimbatore. There is also a railway station at Karur on the Erode–Tiruchy section of the Southern Railway, and it is about 70 km from Erode and 75 km from Tiruchy. The temple at Karuvoor is built on a 2.65 acres (10,700 m^{2}) site. The front Gopuram is 120 feet (37 m) in height. The presiding deity in the main shrine (Moolvar) is a swayambu lingam. He is called Pasupateeswarar or Aanilaiappar. There are two images of Ambal here, Sundaravalli and Alankaravalli. The shrine of female deity Sundaravalli is facing south. Images of mythological characters are found on the tower. There are 2 corridors inside the temple. The 100 pillar mandapam is a prominent portion of the temple.

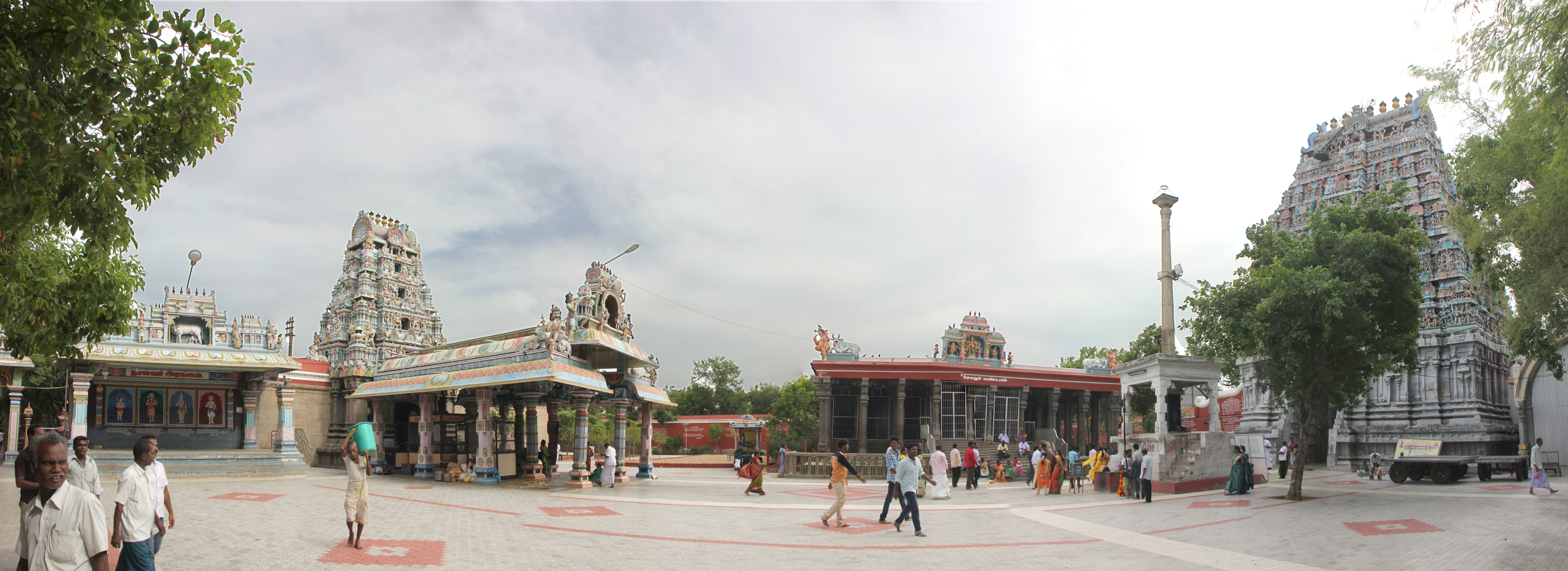
Karur Pasupateeswarar temple

== Religious importance ==
It is one of the shrines of the 275 Paadal Petra Sthalams. Sundarar and Sambandar composed Thevaram Pathigam in this temple. The temple is counted as one of the temples located in the southern bank of river Amaravati, a tributary of Cauvery.

== Festivals ==
The sun's rays falls on the lingam 3 days in a year during the Tamil month of Panguni (mid March to mid April). The annual Brahmotsavam is celebrated in the same month. Other festivals include the Eripaththa Nayanar utsavam, Navaratri in September, and Arudra Darisanam in January 22-01-2021 To 24-01-2021 3 days.
