= Athiyaman (Sathiyaputhra) =

Ancient rulers of southern India

Athiyaman Sathiyaputhra
- Current region: Tamil Nadu
- Historic seat: Thagadur (Dharmapuri)
- Connected families: Chera

Athiyaman (also known as Athiyan, Adhiyaman, Adigaman, or as Sathiyaputhra in Indo-Aryan) were an ancient line of rulers based in Thagadur, present day Dharmapuri, in the north western Tamil country, dating back to at least the 3rd century BCE. They were one of the four major powers of the Tamilakam (the Tamil country) during the second half of the first millennium BCE, bordered by the Cheras to the southwest and the Pandyas and Cholas to the south.

The Athiyamans are mentioned in early historic Tamil literature (the Sangam Literature), as well as in inscriptions such as the edicts of the Maurya emperor Asoka (3rd century BCE) and a Tamil-Brahmi cave record from Jambai (Viluppuram). The Tamil-Brahmi inscription at Jambai, Tirukkoyilur, provide details of their sovereignty in the c. 1st century CE. The most well-known ruler of this dynasty was Neduman Anchi, who is listed as one of the kadai ezhu vallal (the last seven great patrons) in early historic Tamil literature.

Their rule is mentioned in the Gummireddipura plates, with the added title "Sathyaputhra" — meaning "Members of the Fraternity of Truth" — a term synonymous with the Chera dynasty. Vidukathazhagiya Perumal, a late 12th century AD century ruler of this family, is described as the descendant of a certain Ezhini, an Adigaman of the Chera (Sanskrit: Kerala) family.

== Quotes ==
"King of the Athiyans! You who give excitement-causing alcohol! Your powerful hand with its swirling bracelets lifts a victorious sword and strikes down enemies in battlefields, O Anji with a golden garland, who is rich in murderous battles! May you live as long as he lives, the one who has a milk-like glowing crescent moon on his head, with neck as dark as sapphire!"

— Avvaiyar ,Purananuru -91

== Inscriptional records ==
=== Inscriptions of Ashoka ===
The Maurya emperor Ashoka (3rd century BCE) mentions the Athiyaman dynasty—as the Sathiyaputhras—in his inscriptions, alongside the Cholas, Pandyas, and Cheras (referred to as the Keralaputhras). This suggests that the Athiyamans held significant importance in south India during Ashoka's time, on par with the Cheras, Cholas, and Pandyas.

"Ye Ca anta ata Choda, Pandiya, Satiyaputo, Kedalaputo, Tambapanni, Antiyogo nama, Yonalaja"

Everywhere in the conquered dominions of king Priyadarsin, the Beloved of the Gods, and the dominions on the borders as those of the Chola, the Pandya, the Satiyaputra, the Keralaputra, Tamraparni, the Yavana King named Antiyoka and the other neighbouring kings of this Antiyoka...

=== Jambai inscription ===
A Tamil-Brahmi inscription, generally dated to the 1st century CE, found in Jain caves at Jambai in Tirukkoyilur, Viluppuram district (formerly South Arcot) in Tamil Nadu, refers to the Athiyaman dynasty as the Sathyaputhras.

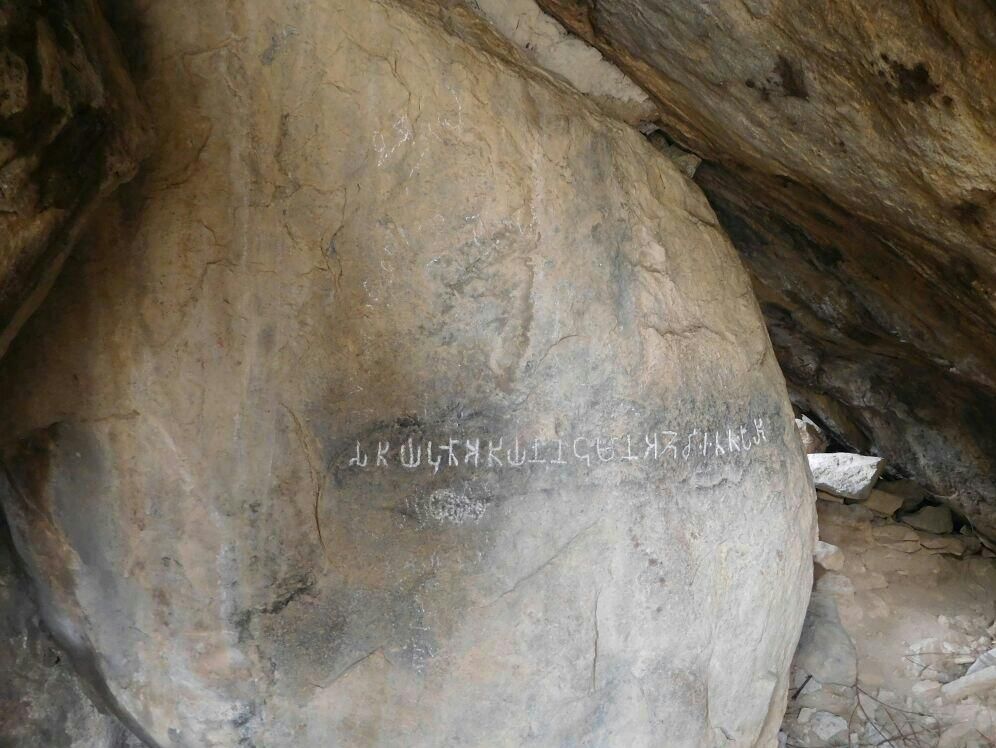
Jambai Inscription

"satiyaputō atiyan neṭumān añci itta paḷi"

The hermitage was given by Atiyan Netuman Anci, the Satiyaputta.

The inscription records the endowment of a cave-shelter by the ruler Athiyan Neduman Anchi, who bears the title "Sathiyaputho". It provides the names of his dynasty ("Athiyan"), his father ("Neduman"), and himself ("Anchi"). The Athiyan ruler Neduman Anchi mentioned in the inscription is also referenced in early historic Tamil works such as Purananuru and Akananuru. The discovery of this inscription enabled historians to identify the title "Athiyaman", found in early Tamil literature, with the "Sathiyaputras" mentioned in Ashoka's inscriptions.

The Gummireddipura plates also mention the Sathyaputhra Adigaman dynasty.

== See also ==
- Velir
- Kingdoms of Ancient India
