= Avvaiyar =

Avvaiyar (also Auvaiyar or Avviyar) is an honorific historically used in Tamil culture and literature, and is defined as "respectable elderly woman". There are at least three poets titled Avvaiyar:

- Avvaiyar (Sangam poet), a 1st-century BCE poet
- Avvaiyar (8th-century poet), an 8th-century poet
- Avvaiyar (12th-century poet), a 12th-century poet

The name may also refer to:

- Avvaiyar (film), a 1953 Indian film by Kothamangalam Subbu
- Avviyar (crater), a crater on Venus named for the Sangam period poet

== See also ==
- Avva, a name
- Avva (film), a 2008 Indian film
