= Vanchi (early historic) =

Name of the Chera capital, south India

Vanchi was a headquarters of the Chera dynasty, which ruled central Kerala and western Tamil Nadu (the Kongu country) in the early historic south India. The historic location of the Chera dynasty capital, Vanchi, is one of the most famous and highly debated topics in South Indian archaeology, pitting Kodungallur in Kerala against Karur in Tamil Nadu. Rather than one being right and the other wrong, modern historical consensus indicates that the ancient Chera Dynasty actually operated from both locations across different time periods and branches. Excavations in Karur along the Amaravati River have yielded vast amounts of ancient Roman coins, pottery, and Tamil-Brahmi inscriptions naming Chera kings of three generations. Most historians agree this was the principal capital of the Irumporai branch of the early Chera dynasty during the Sangam era.

When looking strictly at the text of the epic Cilappatikaram, the description of the capital city features elements that strongly support Kodungallur (Kerala) as the setting for the final chapter Vanchi Kandam. The text describes Kannagi walking west from Madurai into the high mountain ranges (Western Ghats) to enter the Chera kingdom. The presence of specific ritual elements mentioned in the text—such as the Pattini (Kannagi) temple, and the tradition of female oracles—strongly aligns with the cultural history of the Kodungallur Sree Kurumba Bhagavathy Temple. Located near the famous ancient port of Muziris, this area was the global trade hub connecting India to the Roman, Greek, and Arab empires. The nearby Thiruvanchikulam Temple only Shiva temple mentioned in Periya puranam from Kerala stands as a direct testament to the city's royal Chera history.It served as the primary headquarters for the western coastal branch during the Sangam period and later became the grand capital of the Second Chera Empire (Kulasekhara Perumals) from the 9th century onward.

The following Chera (Kerala) capitals were referred to as "Vanchi":

- Vanchi Karur or Karuvur — present-day Karur, Tamil Nadu (capital of the Cheras or Keralas of the western Tamil country)
- Kodungallur — Mahodaya-puram (Makothai) — Thiruvanchikkulam (capital of the medieval Chera rulers of Kerala)
