= Vira Kerala =

Royal title

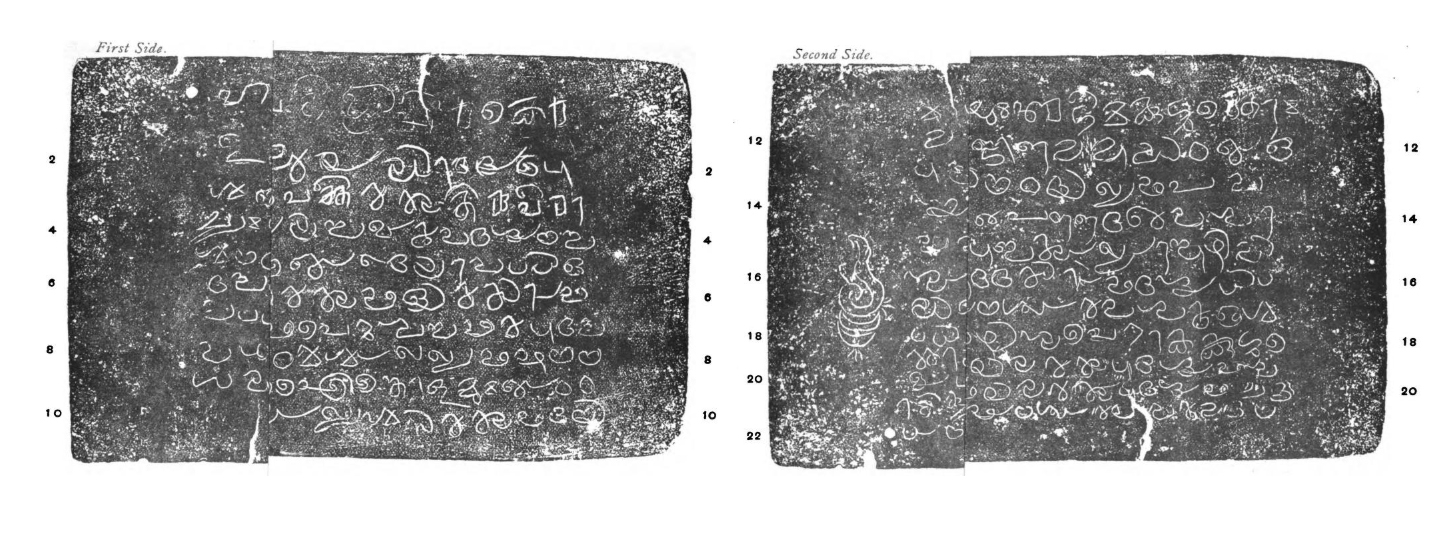
Viraraghava copper plates (1225 CE)

Vira Kerala, also spelled Veera Kerala or Keralan, was a name given to male members of several medieval ruling families of Tamil Nadu and Kerala.

Several royals with the name "Vira Kerala" are known to scholars.

The following is a list of royals with the name "Vira Kerala" (till c. 12th century)

1. Vira Kerala Amara Bhujanga Deva, a royal from Kongu Chera dynasty.
  - Probably identical with Amara Bhujanga Deva, one of the princes defeated by Chola king Rajaraja (Tiruvalangadu Grant). Probably a Pandya or a Kongu Chera prince.
2. Vira Kerala, from a Nagari coin legend in British Museum (11th-12th centuries AD).
3. Vira Kerala, a royal found in several inscriptions of Kongu Chera dynasty (western Tamil Nadu).
4. Vira Kerala, fl. 11th century, one of the so-called "thennavar muvar". Defeated by Chola king Rajadhiraja (trampled by his war elephant called Attivarana).
  - Probably a Kongu Chera or a Pandya prince (son of a Pandya and a Chera princess).
  - This royal was previously considered as a successor of Bhaskara Ravi (i. e., a Chera Perumal king of Kerala) (K. A. N. Sastri and E. P. N. K. Pillai).
5. Minavan Vira Kerala, a Pandya prince, probably identical with the Kerala defeated by Rajadhiraja.
6. Vira Kerala, the first post-Chera Perumal king of Venad (south Kerala), 12th century AD, appears in a Cholapuram (Nagercoil) inscription (1126 AD).
7. Vira Kerala, a son of the last Chera Perumal Rama Kulasekhara and a Venad princess (as per Kerala tradition) - probably identical with (6).
8. Vira Kerala Chakravarti, the ancestor of Vira Raghava Chakravarti, the 13th century Perumapadappu king of Cranganore (Viraraghava copper plates).
