= Maravarman Rajasimha II =

Maravarman Rajasimman II
- Reign: 900–915 AD
- Coronation: c. 900 AD
- Predecessor: Parantaka Viranarayana
- Successor: Sundara Pandyan
- Issue: Sundara Pandyan; Vira Pandyan
- Dynasty: Pandya
- Father: Parantaka Viranarayana

Maravarman Rajasimha II (reigned c. 900–915) (பராந்தகப் பாண்டியன்) was the last major king of the early medieval Pandya kingdom (6th–10th century AD) of South India. He was the son and successor of Parantaka Viranarayanan (r. c. 880–900 AD) and the donor of the Larger Sinnamanur Plates.

Rajasimha was the son of Parantaka Viranarayanan and Vanavan Mahadevi (a Kongu Chera princess). When the Chola king Parantaka I (r. c. 907–55) invaded the Pandya territories in 910, he captured Madurai (hence the title Madurai Konda ("Conqueror of Madurai") for the Chola. Rajasimha II received help from the Sri Lankan king Kassapa V, though was still ultimately defeated by the Cholas in the decisive Battle of Vellur(Velur).

Rajasimha fled the Pandya country and stayed in Sri Lanka for some years. He then found refuge in the Chera country, leaving even his royal insignia in Sri Lanka.
