= Salem division =

Revenue division in Tamil Nadu, India

Salem division is a revenue division in the Salem district of Tamil Nadu, India.
