= Velur, Thanjavur =

Velur
- village
- Country: India
- State: Tamil Nadu
- District: Thanjavur
- Taluk: Thanjavur

Population (2001)
  - Total: 441

Languages
  - Official: Tamil
- Time zone: UTC+5:30 (IST)

Velur is a village in the Thanjavur taluk of Thanjavur district, Tamil Nadu, India.

== Demographics ==
Velur had a total population of 441 people in 2001, including 214 men and 227 women. 1061/sex was the ratio. 54.22 percent of people could read.
