= Maravarman Rajasimha I =

- Pallava - bhan- jana ( Destroyer of the Pallavas)
- Reign: c. 710 - 765 AD
- Predecessor: Ko Chadaiyan Ranadhira
- Successor: Varagunavarman l
- Dynasty: Pandya
- Father: Ko Chadaiyan Ranadhira

Maravarman Rajasimha I (reigned c. 710 – 765 AD), also known as Pallavabhanjana,(Tamil:முதலாம் இராசசிம்மன்) was a Pandya king of early medieval south India. He was the son and successor of Ko Chadaiyan Ranadhira. He remembered for his important successes against the Pallavas and in the Kongu country.

Although mentioned in the Larger Sinnamanur Plates, the Velvikkudi Grant is the major source of information about this Pandya king.

== Life and career ==
=== Campaign against the pallavas ===
==== Siege of Nandigrama ====
When the Pallava king Parameswara II died in a battle with the Gangas, a crisis arose in the Pallava kingdom over succession. The Pallava officials then chose a young prince, Nandivarman II Pallavamalla, r. c. 731 - 96 AD, as the next monarch. Rajasimha espoused the cause of a son of Parameswara II (named Chitramaya) in this crisis.

The Pandya seems to have taken part in the campaigns which led to the siege of Nandivarman II in Nandigrama (Nandipuram, Kumbakonam) by the Tamil princess. The Velvikkudi Grant ascribes him victories at Neduvayal, Kurumadai, Mannikuricchi (Mannaikkudi), Tirumangai, Puvalur, Periyalur and Kodumbalur.The grant also says that he defeated Nandivarman II in the Battle of Kuzhumbur. The siege was eventually raised by Pallava general Udayachandra (as mentioned in the Udayendiram Plates of Pallavamalla). He defeated the Pandyas, beheaded prince Chitramaya, and made the Pallava throne secure for Nandivarman II.

Even after defeating the Gangas in c. 760 AD, the Pallavas were unable to restrain the growing power of the Pandyas.

=== Kongu country ===
Rajasimha I won a battle at Periyalur, then crossed the Kaveri River to subjugate the country of Mala Kongam (borders of Trichy and Thanjavur districts). The Malava king who suffered defeat gave his daughter in marriage to Rajasimha. It seems that the conquests of the Pandya extended up to Pandikkodumudi (Kodumudi).

=== Expedition to chera country ===
Rajasimha is reportly to have "renewed the cities of Kudal, Vanchi and Kozhi". It is possible that this is a reference to the conquest of the ancient capitals of the Pandyas, the Cheras and the Cholas.

=== Battle of Venbai ===
Velvikkudi Grant describes the Pandya foray in to the Ganga kingdom (a vassal of the Chalukyas). It says that the Chalukya king was defeated by the Pandya king in a Battle of Venbai Subsequently, a Ganga princess was offered in marriage to a Pandya prince (a son of the Pandya king). The Chalukya king who was defeated was probably Kirtivarman II (and thus the southern territory of the Chalukya kingdom was lost to the Pandyas under Kirtivarman II).

Marangāri was a minister and military leader of the Pandya kingdom during the early medieval period of South India. He is known from the Velvikkudi copper plates and other inscriptions, which describe him as a trusted official and commander under a Pandya ruler. He is noted for his participation in the Battle of Venbai.
