= Kochchadaiyan Ranadhira =

Pandya king

- Tenna - Vanavan , Sembiyan , Cholan, Madura - Karunatakan , Kongar koman (Lord of Kongu country ) , King of Kings
- Reign: r. c. 670 – 710AD
- Coronation: c. 670 AD
- Predecessor: Arikesari Maravarman Parankusan
- Successor: Maravarman Rajasimha I (son)
- Wife: unnamed Pallava princess
- Dynasty: Pandya
- Father: Arikesari Maravarman

Kochchadaiyan, known as Ranadhira, (Tamil: கோச்சடையான் ரணதீரன்)(r. c. 670 – 710 AD) was a Pandya king of early medieval south India. He was the son and successor of Arikesari Maravarman c. 640–670 CE The name of the king is famously omitted in the Tamil portion of the Larger Sinnamanur Plates.

== Reign ==
Kochadaiyan Ranadhira succeeded his father Arikesari Maravarman.Kochadaiyan Ranadhira was known for his military prowess and conquests, which are recorded in historical accounts and Inscriptions. He also fought many wars and won during his reign. He had to fight many kings to gain supremacy in the south. The Velvikudi copperplates speak about his victory. Ranadhira defeated the Cheras, Cholas, Kongas, Karnatas and Ay chieftains in the battles. The Velvikkudi grant also mentions he victories at battles of Sengodi and Pudankodu.

== Titles ==
Kochadayan Ranathira bore several titles—Tennan Vanavan, Sembiyan, Cholan, King of Kings, Madurakarunatakan, and Kongar Koamaan—reflecting his military victories and authority over various regions, and he was also known by the title Ranadhira, meaning "ferocious warrior". He was known as Tennan Vanavan for defeating the Cheras, Sembiyan and Cholan for defeating the Cholas, Madurakarunatakan for defeating the Karnatas (i.e. Chalukyas), and Kongar Koamaan (Lord of Kongas) for defeating the Kongu country. During his reign, the dominance of the Pandya kingdom increased further.

These titles, documented in historical records such as the Velvikudi copper plates, provide insights into Kochadaiyan Ranadhira's significant military achievements and his success in expanding the Pandya kingdom's influence across the South Indian region.

== Military achievements ==
=== Expansion into Kongu country ===
Chadaiyan extended the Pandya influence into the Kongu country. The result of this foray does not appear to have been permanent as the Kongu country is said to have been conquered by his successor also.

=== Suppressing a revolt in the Ay country ===
Ranadhira also suppressed a revolt in the Ay country (Trivandrum-Tirunelveli). The Ay chieftain Ay Vel was defeated in the Battle of Marudur (Tiruppudaimarudur, Ambarasamudram) and had to acknowledge the Pandya supremacy.

=== Asserting dominance over Cheras and Cholas ===
Chadaiyan is given the titles "Vanavan", "Chembiyan" and "Chola" which seem to claim supremacy over the Chera and Chola

=== Victory over the chalukyas ===
In reign of Paramesvaravarman I, he was attacked by the Chalukyan king Vikramaditya I and seized Kanchipuram after defeating the Pallava king. According to the Chalukyan records Vikramaditya I seems to have pushed on to the south, and he was encamped at Uragapura (Uraiyur) on the south bank of the Kaveri river on April 25 A.D. 674. Where he was opposed by Paramesvaravarman I and the Pandyan king Kochchadaiyan,near Trichinopoly a battle was fought at Peruvalanallur. And the Kendur plates say that Vikramaditya I, fought with the Pandyas.We have also Supposed that Pandya king was one of the three confederates who gained the victory at Peruvallanallur. Pallava and Pandya records equally claim that, in this battle the Chalukyas was defeated.The Velvikudi copper plates mention Ranadhira victory over the Karnatas(i.e.,Chalukyas) And bore the title of (Madurakarunatakan). Defeated the Chalukyan forces led by Vikramaditya I, in the Battle of Peruvallanallur.According to N. Subramaniam, the title ‘Ranadhira’ could be interpreted as having been assumed after a victory over Vikramaditya I, also known as ‘Ranarasika’. Vikramaditya, despite commanding a large army, was forced to leave the battlefield.Based on these evidences, scholars such as D. C. Sircar theorize that Vikramaditya fought against the Pallavas as a subordinate of his brothers, and ascended the throne only after their deaths. The term "three kings" apparently refers to the Chola, Chera, and Pandya rulers who had allied with the Pallavas.

=== Victory over Maharathas ===
"at the great city called Maagalapura, where the peacock danced with the cuckoo near tanks perfumed with opening flowers, (Kochadaiyan) attacked and destroyed the Maharathas (and thus) removed the word “common property” (with reference to) the country (bordering) on the roaring seas."

He is also said to have attacked and defeated the "Maharathas" in the city of Mangalapuram (modern Mangalore). The Velvikkudi copper plates, issued during the reign of Jatila Parantaka Nedunjadaiyan (also identified with Varaguna I, r. c. 765–815 CE), refer to a battle at Mangalapura (generally it identified with present-day Mangalore) in which the “Maharathas” were defeated. This event is often placed in the early 8th century CE and attributed to the reign of Kochadaiyan Ranadhira, the grandfather of Jatila Parantaka.( Varagunavarman l) According to Historian interpret the term “Maharathas” in this context as referring to the Chalukyas of Badami. In this view, the Chalukya ruler Vijayaditya (r. c. 696–733/734 CE) may have been involved in the conflict, possibly along with his subordinate, the Alupa ruler Prithvisagara, who is suggested to have been defeated at Mangalapura. However, the identification of the “Maharathas” with the Chalukyas is not universally accepted and remains a matter of scholarly interpretation. The campaign is generally regarded as evidence of Pandyan expansion and influence along the western coast, including regions corresponding to present-day coastal Karnataka.
