= T. V. Sadasiva Pandarathar =

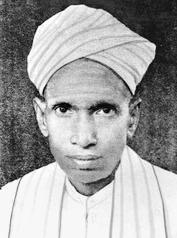
- Born: 15 August 1892; Thiruppurambiyam
- Died: 1 February 1960 (aged 67)
- Occupations: Poet, writer
- Writing career
- Genre: History

T. V. Sadasiva Pandarathar (15 July 1892 – 2 January 1960) was a Tamil historian from Tamil Nadu, India.

Sadasiva Pandarathar was born in Thiruppurambiyam to Vaithiyalinga Pandarathar and Meenatchi Ammal. He finished his schooling in 1910 and learnt Tamil grammar and literature from Pinnathur Narayanaswamy Iyer and Valmpuri Balasubramania Pillai. He worked at Kumbakonam Taluk office and as a teacher at Kumbakonam high school for a few years.

During 1917-42 he worked as a teacher in Banathurai high school.

He published his historical essays in the magazine Senthamizh. In 1930, his first book Mudhalam kulothunga Cholan was published. During 1942-53 and 53-60 he was a lecturer at the Tamil research department of Annamalai University. During this period he conducted extensive field research and wrote his most known work Pirkaala Cholar saritharam (lit. History of the Later Cholas). It was published in three parts in 1949, 51 and 61. Apart from this he is known for his two Tamizh ilakkiya varalaaru (lit. Tamil literary history) books and his various Thala Varalaaru (lit. Temple history) books.

1. Thirupurambyam Temple History
2. Sembiyanmadevi Temple History
3. Kaveripoompatinam
4. Thirukovilur are the most popular Temple History Books wrote by him. They set new standards for such Temple History books.

He was one of the first few people to write Historical books in Tamil when English speaking scholars researched and wrote regarding Tamil History in English. His first book on Kulothunga Chozhan, attracted praises from U.Ve.Sa and set the standards for Historical Research books in Tamil.
