= Noboru Karashima =

Japanese historian and writer (1933–2015)

- Born: April 24, 1933; Japan
- Died: November 26, 2015 (aged 82); Tokyo
- Other name: 辛島 昇
- Occupations: Professor, Writer, Historian
- Awards: Fukuoka Asian Culture Prize; Padma Shri

Academic work
- Institutions: University of Tokyo; Taisho University; Epigraphical Society of India; Japan Association for South Asian Studies; International Association of Tamil Research (IATR)
- Main interests: South Indian History; South Asian History

Noboru Karashima (辛島 昇, Karashima Noboru; 24 April 1933 – 26 November 2015) was a Japanese historian, writer and Professor Emeritus in University of Tokyo, Japan. He also served as Professor Emeritus at the Taisho University, Japan. He was a prominent scholar of Asia in the studies of south Indian and South Asian histories. He has rewritten historical accounts on medieval south India and published a number of writings.

Professor Karashima played a critical role in developing Indo-Japan cultural ties and was conferred the Padma Shri award in 2013, one of India's highest civilian award, for his contribution in the field of literature and education. In a rare gesture the Indian Prime Minister Dr. Manmohan Singh handed over the award personally to Professor Karashima in Tokyo. He died of leukemia in November, 2015.

== Position held ==
- President of the Epigraphical Society of India in 1985.
- President of the Japan Association for South Asian Studies from 1996 to 2000.
- He was the President of International Association of Tamil Research (IATR) from 1989 to 2010. He organised 8th World Tamil Conference in 1995 at Thanjavur, Tamil Nadu. He and IATR boycotted 9th World Tamil Conference in 2009 due to the political interference. He resigned from the post of president in 2010 because of the same reason.

== Books ==
- South Indian History and Society - Studies from Inscriptions AD 850-1800, Oxford University Press, Delhi (1984)
- Kingship in Indian History
- Towards a New Formation: South Indian Society under Vijayanagar Rule (1992)
- A Concordance of the Names in Cōl̲a inscriptions
- History and Society in South India: The Cholas to Vijayanagar. Comprising South Indian History and Society and Towards a New Formation (2001)
- A Concordance of Nāyakas: The Vijayanagar Inscriptions in South India (2002)
- Ancient to Medieval: South Indian Society in Transition (2009)
- A Concise History of South India. Issues and Interpretations (2014)

== Awards ==
- Fukuoka Asian Culture Prize (1995)
- Japan Academy Prize (2003)
- Person of Cultural Merit (2007)
- Padma Shri (2013)
