= K. A. Nilakanta Sastri =

Indian historian (1892–1975)

Kallidaikurichi Aiyah Nilakanta Sastri
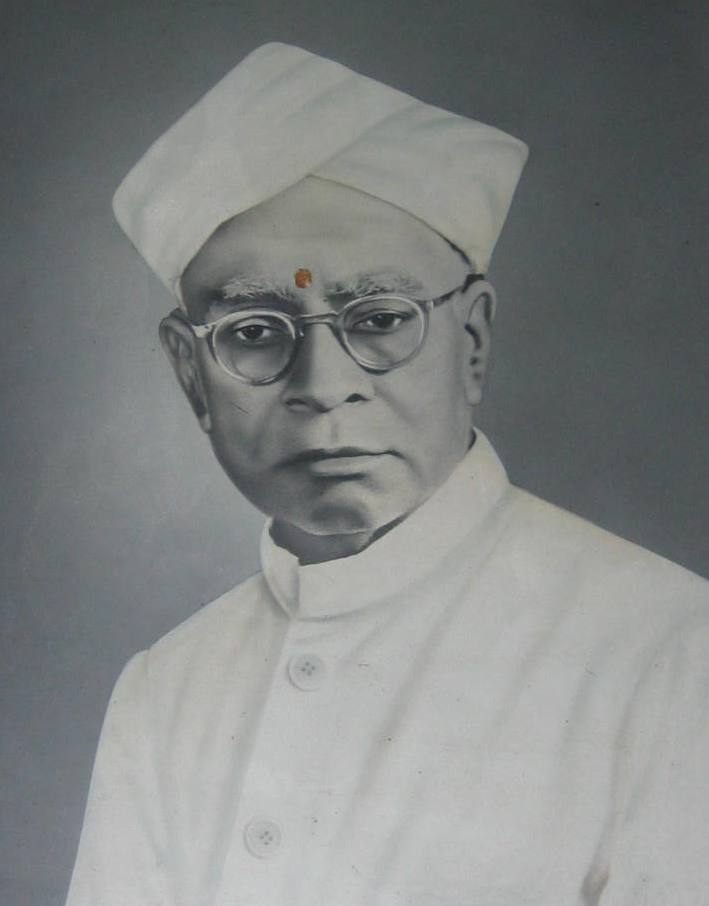
- Born: 12 August 1892; Kallidaikurichi, Tinnevely District, Madras Presidency, British India (now in Tirunelveli District, Tamil Nadu, India)
- Died: 15 June 1975 (aged 82); Madras (now Chennai), Tamil Nadu, India
- Education: Madras Christian College
- Occupations: Historian, Academic, professor, author
- Spouse: Lakshmi Narasammal
- Awards: Padma Bhushan (1957)

Kallidaikurichi Aiyah Nilakanta Sastri (12 August 1892 – 15 June 1975) was an Indian historian who wrote on South Indian history. Many of his books form the standard reference works on the subject. Sastri was acclaimed for his scholarship and mastery of sources and was a recipient of the third highest Indian civilian honour, the Padma Bhushan.

== Career ==
Nilakanta Sastri was born in a Telugu Niyogi Brahmin family, in Kallidaikurichi near Tirunelveli, on 12 August 1892. He completed his FA at the M.D.T Hindu College, Tirunelveli and his college education at the Madras Christian College.

Sastri obtained his MA by ranking first in the Madras Presidency. He joined the Hindu College as a lecturer in 1913 where he taught till 1918. He served as the professor of history, Banaras Hindu University from 1918 to 1920. After that he became the Principal of the then new Arts College of Annamalai University. In 1929, he was employed as the professor of history at National College, Trichy. The same year, he succeeded Sakkottai Krishnaswamy Aiyangar as the Professor of History and Archaeology at the Madras University, a post he held till 1946. He was the Professor of Indology (now the Department of History and Archaeology) at the University of Mysore from 1952 to 1955. He was appointed the ex-officio Director of Archaeology for Mysore State in 1954. He was also the President of the All-India Oriental Conference in the early 1950s. From 1957 to 1972, he served as the Director of UNESCO's Institute of Traditional Cultures of South East Asia. In 1957, he was awarded the Padma Bhushan, India's third highest civilian honour. In the summer of 1959, he was a visiting professor at the University of Chicago where he delivered a series of lectures on South Indian History. Nilakanta Sastri died in 1975.

== Assessment ==
Nilakanta Sastri is regarded as the greatest and most prolific among professional historians of South India. Tamil historian A R Venkatachalapathy regards him as "arguably the most distinguished historian of twentieth-century Tamil Nadu".

In 1915, Bengali historian Jadunath Sarkar, writing in an essay Confessions of a History Teacher in the Modern Review, regretted the lack of acclaimed historical works in vernacular languages and stressed that efforts should be made to write history books and teach history in vernacular languages. Nilakanta Sastri, who was then a young teacher in Thirunelveli, wrote a letter to the newspaper opposing Sarkar's suggestion by saying that "English serves me better as a medium of expression than Tamil – I mean in handling historical subjects. Perhaps the vernacular is not so well off in this part of the country as it should be". Sastri's comments evoked sharp criticism from the nationalist poet Subramanya Bharathi. According to Venkatachalapathy, Sastri's Tamil proficiency was not good and he relied on Tamil scholar S. Vaiyapuri Pillai for understanding Tamil literary works. Thus he was not able to analyse the changing meaning of words over time. Venkatachalapathy says, "In the professional historiography in Tamil Nadu practised in the age of K. A. Nilakanta Sastri there was rarely any interrogation of sources (except in terms of authenticity and chronology)."

Sastri's A History of South India is a recommended textbook for university students of Indian history. In a preface to the 2013 reprint, historian Sanjay Subrahmanyam describes the book thus

... a classic work, which retains its importance and has never quite been replaced. It shows the author's mastery over a huge set of sources, which placed him head and shoulders above other South Indian historians of his time

Historian Noboru Karashima, who edited A Concise History of South India (2014), describes Sastri's A History of South India as an excellent book, and praises Sastri's examination of sources of south Indian history as "thoroughgoing and meticulous". However, Karashima also states that being a Brahmin, Sastri was inclined to emphasize the role of "North Indian and Sanskrit culture in the development of south Indian society", which resulted in occasional bias. Karashima notes that Sastri's book remained the only authoritative scholarly book on the south Indian history for a number of reasons: nobody could match Sastri in bringing out a similar work; attacks from Tamil nationalists deterred historians from writing such a book; and new trends in history writing made composition of works on general history more difficult.

Ganapathy Subbiah (2007) of the Indian History Congress describes Sastri as "the greatest" of all South Indian historians. During Sastri's period, strong language-based movements had emerged in various regions of South India. Subbiah notes that Sastri attempted to portray South India as a distinct geocultural unit, and was keen to dissolve the growth of regionalism in South Indian historiography. Subbiah adds that Sastri's macro-level view of the South Indian history "revolved around Aryan-Dravidian syndrome", and this view changed with his age: in his 20s, Sastri asserted the existence of "an independent Tamil culture which flourished for centuries before it was touched by extraneous influences"; a few years later, he wrote that the culture of the Sangam period was a composite of two distinct "Tamilian and Aryan" cultures; and a decade later, he declared that "Sanskrit is the pivot of our whole culture, and [...] Tamil culture is no exception to this rule". According to Subbiah, Sastri's views should be analyzed in the context of the rise of the anti-Brahmin Dravida Nadu movement in the mid-20th century: his assertions overemphasizing the importance of Indo-Aryan and Sanskrit influence in south Indian history can be seen as "his angry and desperate response" against the Dravida Nadu secessionists.

== Bibliography ==
In all, Nilakanta Sastri authored 25 historical works mostly on the history of South India.

- Sastri, K. A. Nilakanta (1929). The Pāṇḍyan Kingdom from the Earliest Times to the Sixteenth Century. Luzac.
- Sastri, K. A. Nilakanta (1932). Studies in Chola history and administration. University of Madras.
- Sastri, K. A. Nilakanta (1935). The Cholas. University of Madras.
  - Sastri, K. A. Nilakanta (1955). The Cholas (revised 2nd ed.). University of Madras.
- Sastri, K. A. Nilakanta (1936). A comprehensive history of India. Orient Longman.
- Sastri, K. A. Nilakanta (1941). Historical method in relation to problems of South Indian history. University of Madras.
- Sastri, K. A. Nilakanta (1945). Gleanings on social life from the Avadanas. Indian Research Institute.
- Sastri, K. A. Nilakanta (1946). Further sources of Vijayanagara history. University of Madras.
- Sastri, K. A. Nilakanta (1948). The Tamil kingdoms of South India. The National Information & Publications.
- Sastri, K. A. Nilakanta (1949). South Indian Influences in the Far East. Hind Kitabs.
- Sastri, K. A. Nilakanta (1949). History of Sri Vijaya. University of Madras.
- Sastri, K. A. Nilakanta (1955). A History of South India: From Prehistoric Times to the Fall of Vijayanagar. Oxford University Press.
- Sastri, K. A. Nilakanta; H.S Ramanna (1956). Historical method in relation to Indian history.
- Sastri, K. A. Nilakanta (1957). A Comprehensive History of India. Orient Longman.
- Sastri, K. A. Nilakanta (1963). Development of religion in South India. Orient Longman.
- Sastri, K. A. Nilakanta (1964). The Culture and History of the Tamils. K. L. Mukhopadhyay.
- Sastri, K. A. Nilakanta (1964). Sources of Indian history with special reference to South India. Asian Publishing House.
- Sastri, K. A. Nilakanta (1965). A great liberal: speeches and writings of Sir P. S. Sivaswami Aiyar. Allied Publishers.
- Sastri, K. A. Nilakanta; G. Srinivasachari (1966). Life and culture of the Indian people: a historical survey. Allied Publishers.
- Sastri, K. A. Nilakanta (1967). Cultural Contacts Between Aryans and Dravidians. Manaktalas.
- Sastri, K. A. Nilakanta (1967). Age of the Nandas and Mauryas. Motilal Banarsidass.
- Sastri, K. A. Nilakanta; G. Srinivasachari (1971). An Advanced history of India. Allied Publishers.
- Sastri, K. A. Nilakanta (1972). Foreign Notices of South India: From Megasthenes to Ma Huan. University of Madras.
- Sastri, K. A. Nilakanta (1972). Sangam literature: its cults and cultures. Swathi Publishers.
- Sastri, K. A. Nilakanta (1974). Aspects of India's history and culture. Oriental Publishers.
- Sastri, K. A. Nilakanta (1978). South India and South-East Asia: studies in their history and culture. Geetha Book House (Mysore).

== Notes ==
=== Bibliography ===
- Ganapathy Subbiah (2007). "Sectional President's Address – Dakṣināpatha: Where does the path lead us?". Proceedings of the Indian History Congress. 67: 49–81. JSTOR 44147923.
