= List of villages in Viluppuram district =

This is an alphabetical list of villages in Viluppuram district, Tamil Nadu, India.

== A ==
- Andikuli
- Anichangkuppam
- Annamputhur
- Anniyur
- Anumandai
- Aruvapakkam
- Avalurpet

== B-J ==
- Brahmadesam, Tindivanam taluk
- Brahmadesam, Viluppuram taluk
- Chendur
- Endiyur
- Irumbai

== K ==
- Kanchiyur
- Kappur
- Katranpakkam
- Kil Sevalambady
- Kilvalai
- Koonimedu
- Kooteripattu
- Kottakarai
- Kozhipattu
- Kuilappalayam
- Kalinjikuppam

== M-O ==
- Mailam
- Mambalapattu
- Meenambur
- Melpathy
- Mugaiyur
- Mundiyampakkam
- Murukkery
- Nangathur
- Nangilikondan
- Neganur
- Nehanurpatti
- Omandur
- Olakkur

== P-T ==
- Panchalam
- Parrikal
- Pennagar, Gingee
- Perani
- Perumpoondi
- Perumukkal
- Pettai, Villupuram
- Pombur
- Sathiyamangalam, Viluppuram
- Settavarai
- Thiruvakkarai

== V ==
- Vadambalam
- Valathi
- Veedur
- Veeracholapuram
- Viranamur
