= Koonimedu =

Neighbourhood in Villupuram district, Tamil Nadu, India

Koonimedu is a panchayat village in Tamil Nadu, India. It is part of the Marakkanam block of the Viluppuram district and is located 16 kilometres from Pondicherry and 130 km (81 mi) from Chennai. It has a population of approximately 5000 people, of whom 50% are Hindus and the remaining 50% predominantly Muslims.Koonimedu is also known as chinna Kuwait because of their occupational in 1972 baji abdul lathif traveled from mumbai to kuwait at firs person in this village via sea route. One after another, a Koonimedu people travelleing Kuwait to earn. Apart from Kuwait, some other countries where Koonimedu NRIs living is Singapore, Malaysia, UAE, Oman, Qatar, France and Saudi Arabia. Koonimedu village was one of the oldest villages in Villupuram. It is said that, Muslim population spread here during period King Arcod Nawab, for his soldiers passing way to Pondicherry old French colony. The latitude 12.11574 and longitude 79.907041 are the geocoordinate of the Koonimedu. Chennai is the state capital for Koonimedu village. It is located around 116.5 km (72.4 mi) away from Koonimedu.. The other nearest state capital from Koonimedu is Pondicherry and its distance is 21.3 km The other surrounding state capitals are Pondicherry 21.3 km, Bangalore 271.3 km, Thiruvananthapuram 506.5 km (314.7 mi)

The surrounding nearby villages and its distance from Koonimedu are Anumandai 5.9 km, Marakkanam 10.5 km, Siruvadi 12.5 km, Endiyur 23.2 km, Molasur 24.1 km, Annamputhur 26.0 km, etc.

== The official language of Koonimedu ==
The native language of Koonimedu is Tamil and more than 25 percent of koonimedu people communicates in Urdu. As majority living here is Urdu Muslims.

== Koonimedu Sun rise time ==
Koonimedu village is located in the UTC 5.30 time zone and it follows Indian standard time(IST). Koonimedu sun rise time varies 10 minutes from IST. The vehicle driving side in Koonimedu is left, all vehicles should take left side during driving. Koonimedu people are using its national currency which is Indian Rupee and its international currency code is INR. Koonimedu phones and mobiles can be accessed by adding the Indian country dialing code +91 from abroad. Koonimedu people are following the dd/mm/yyyy date format in day-to-day life. Koonimedu domain name extension( country code top-level domain (cTLD)) is .in .

== The nearest railway stations in and around Koonimedu ==
The nearest railway station to Koonimedu is Puducherry which is located in and around 22.9 kilometres' distance. The following table shows other railway stations and its distance from koonimedu.

- Puducherry railway station 22.9 km
- Villianur railway station 27.1 km
- Olakur railway station 29.2 km
- Tindivanam railway station 30.5 km
- Mailam railway station 30.6 km

== Nearest airport to Koonimedu ==
Koonimedu's nearest airport is Pondicherry Airport situated at 16.0 km distance. Few more airports around Koonimedu are as follows.

- Pondicherry Airport 16.0 km
- Tambaram Air Force Station 90.6 km
- Chennai International Airport 101.8 km

== The nearest banks and atm in and around Koonimedu ==
- State Bank Of India Koonimedu .
- Indian Overseas Bank Koonimedu.
- SBI ATM Koonimedu.
- IOB Atm Koonimedu.
- SBI Atm Anumandai.

== Nearest districts to Koonimedu ==
The other nearest district headquarters is puducherry situated at 21.8 km distance from Koonimedu. Surrounding districts from Koonimedu are as follows.

- Puducherry district 21.8 km
- Cuddalore district 44.4 km
- Viluppuram district 49.0 km
- Kanchipuram district 84.4 km
- Tiruvannamalai district 91.1 km

== Nearest town/city to Koonimedu ==
Koonimedu's nearest town/city/important place is Marakkanam located at the distance of 10.5 kilometres. Surrounding town/city/TP/CT from Koonimedu are as follows:

- Marakkanam 10.5 km
- Kalapet 5.0 km
- Pondicherry 21.3 km
- Villupuram 49.0 km
- Auroville 15.0 km

== Schools in and around Koonimedu ==
Koonimedu nearest schools has been listed as follows.

- Government hr sec school 0 km
- AL Rasheed matric high school 0 km
- Alm metric hr sec school 0 km
- Puc school 0 km
- The Study school 5 km
- Kolping matri hr sec school 5 km
- Kazhikkuppam School 6.6 km
- Ragavendra School Auroville Via 16.0 km
- Kottakuppam High School With Play Ground 19.0 km
- Kottakuppam High School 19.1 km

Government hr.sec.school anumandai.3 km

== Beaches in and around Koonimedu ==
Koonimedu's nearest beach is Pondicherry Beach located at the distance of 12.4 kilometers. Surrounding beaches from Koonimedu are as follows.

- Nochikuppam beach
- White Beach 00 km
- Pondicherry Beach 12.4 km
- Silver Beach 43.9 km
- Mahabalipuram Beach 63.5 km
- Parankipatai Beach 71.4 km
- Golden Beach 96.3 km

== Koonimedu map ==
Google map
