= List of educational institutions in Viluppuram district =

Villupuram district, India has several primary, secondary and tertiary educational institutions.

Different schools in Villupuram follow the curricula set by their board of choice, such as the Tamil Nadu State Board or the CBSE. Some schools have become model schools in the recent past.

== Colleges in Villupuram District ==
At tertiary level, the range of colleges in Viluppuram varies from Arts and Science Colleges (both Government and privately run) to professional colleges for Engineering and Medical Studies.

In 2010, Government Villupuram medical college was started functioning at Mundiyampakkam (8 km away from Villupuram on the way to Chennai).

=== Engineering ===
- IFET College of Engineering, an autonomous Institution, Villupuram
- Mailam Engineering College, Mailam

=== Schools ===
- The Claribel Matric school, Villupuram
- Sacred Heart Anglo-Indian Higher Secondary School, Villupuram
- Railway Mixed High School
- Ramakrishna Mission Vidyalaya Matric Higher Secondary School
- E.S. Lords International School
