= Viluppuram (disambiguation) =

Viluppuram is a municipality in Tamil Nadu, India

Viluppuram, or Villupuram, may also refer to:

- Viluppuram district, a district in Tamil Nadu, India
- Viluppuram taluk, a taluk in Viluppuram district
- Viluppuram (Lok Sabha constituency)
- Villupuram (State Assembly Constituency)
