= Pennagar =

Pennagar may refer to two places in Tamil Nadu, India:

- Pennagar, Gingee, a village panchayat in Gingee taluk, Villupuram District
- Pennagar, Vellore, a village panchayat in Vellore Taluk, Vellore District
