= Chendur, Tamil Nadu =

Chendur Sendur
- Village
- Location of Chendur in Tamil Nadu Chendur (India)
- Coordinates: 12.16722°N 79.53667°E
- Country: India
- State: Tamil Nadu
- Former name: Sendur
- Pincode: 604 302
- Area Calling Code: +91 4147
- Vehicle registration: TN 16
- Official language: Tamil

Chendur is a village in India which is located near to the Mailam Sri Subramania Swamy Temple, Thiruvakkarai Vakkira Kaliamman Temple and Tindivanam town, and is also a part of Villupuram District of Tamil Nadu.

== List of schools in Chendur ==
Name	Administration	Affiliation
Primary School	Government	Samacheer Kalvi
High School	Government	Samacheer Kalvi
