= Katranpakkam =

Village in Villupuram district

Katrampakkam is a village in Vanur taluk, Viluppuram district, Tamil Nadu, India. It is a small village which had a population of approximately 1,300 people in 2024

== Economy ==
The primary economic activity in the village is agriculture. In the past, the majority of the population worked for a small group of landlords but now more people are going to school and obtaining higher degrees. The majority of the people currently work in nearby towns and cities such as Pondicherry, Tindivanam, Chennai, and even as far away as Bangalore.

== Transport ==
It is situated on National Highway 66 of 15 km from Pondicherry to Krishnagiri highway. Katrampakkam connects the East Coast Road(ECR) by 11 km of East to Bay of Bengal.

== Education ==
There is a government school in Katrampakkam. A feature of the school is that it serves a free lunch which includes eggs for all its students in accordance with Tamil Nadu Department of Education regulations. Currently, students are taught Tamil up to "X standard" after which students progress to higher levels of schooling in nearby villages. As of January 2024 the school is undergoing major renovations sponsored by Max William Vale, a local land owner.
