= Perumpoondi =

- Village
- Location in Tamil Nadu, India Perumpoondi (India)
- Coordinates: 12.21°N 79.26°E
- Country: India
- State: Tamil Nadu
- District: Villupuram

Government
  - Panchayat: Sangeetha Sankar

Area
  - Total: 5 km^{2} (1.9 sq mi)

Population (2001)
  - Total: 1,250
  - Density: 250/km^{2} (650/sq mi)

Languages
  - Official: Tamil
- Time zone: UTC+5:30 (IST)
- PIN: 604210
- Telephone code: 04145

Perumpoondi is a village located in the Gingee taluk Viluppuram district of Tamil Nadu, India. It is located 12 kilometres (7.5 mi) from Ginee and 32 kilometres (20 mi) from Tindivanam.
