= Anniyur, Viluppuram =

Anniyur Anniyur
- Village
- Nickname: Ramanatheesuram
- Location in Tamil Nadu, India Anniyur (India)
- Coordinates: 12°02′51″N 79°36′59″E
- Country: India
- State: Tamil Nadu
- District: Viluppuram
- Named after: Temple

Government
  - Type: Village Panchayat
  - Body: Village Panchayat

Population (2000)
  - Total: 1,500

Languages
  - Official: Tamil
- Time zone: UTC+5:30 (IST)
- PIN: 605202
- Vehicle registration: TN-32
- Nearest city: Villupuram
- Lok Sabha constituency: Villupuram
- Civic agency: Village Panchayat

Anniyur is a village located in the District of Viluppuram in the southern state of Tamil Nadu under the Union of India. It lies 25 kilometres from Gingee, Vilupuram

== Early history ==
Early of history of Anniyur remains unclear, but the rock scripts of the two oldest temples shows this village's status in the 12th century. Anniyur was one of the part of Thondai Naadu which was ruled by cholas and later by pallavas. The two temples are important landmarks of Anniyur. The Vishnu temple was built by the minister of Krishna Devaraya named as Bethanna and the Shiva temple was built by the pallavas. The rock pillar which was laid before the Vishnu temple is 30 feet high, and it was made from a single rock.

=== Medieval history ===
In medieval time Anniyur was one of the Taluk of South Arcot District. The history of the systematic administration of the Land Revenue of erstwhile South Arcot District begins with the acquisition from the Nawab in 1801, when the Nawab made over the Carnatic to the company, Captain Graham was appointed to take charge of the District lying between Palar and Portonovo rivers and become the first Collector South Arcot.

Then Cuddalore district consisted of the 21 Taluks of Arcot, Vellore, Thiruvathur, Polur, Arani (the Jagir of that name) Wandiwash, Chetpet, Thiruvannamalai, Gingee, Tindivanam, Valudavur, Villupuram, Anniyur, Tirukoilur, Thiruvennainallur, Tiruvadi, Elavanasur, Kallakurichi, Vridhachalam, Tittagudi and Bhuvanagiri.

Thiru Patchiyappa Mudaliyar was the village's first president. During this time Anniyur grew significantly. He was served as the Secretary to the Farmers Cooperative Society. The Murugan Temple Festival which was celebrated every year in the month of Thai is a 75 years old grant festival of Anniyur.

== Demographics ==
More than 15,000 people are inhabitants of the village.

== Economy ==
During the 1960s making hand looms was the primary occupation Anniyur. Most of the workers later moved to towns for good earnings. The people in this village are mostly farmers. Sugar Cane is the major crop cultivated over ninety percentage. The cultivated Sugar Cane crop is sold to Rajshree Sugar Mills, Mundiyampakkam. Irrigation to farm lands mostly depends the seasonal rainfall of North-East Monsoon.

== Administration ==
The current village administrators are:

- Member of Parliament: Mr. D. Ravikumar of VCK (Villupuram Constituency)
- MLA: Mr. N. Pugazhenthi (Vikravandi Constituency)
- Union Councillor: Mrs. Sarasu Devarasu
- President: Mrs. Prema Kumaran
- Vice President: Mrs. Siva
- Panchayat Secretary: Mr. M. Senthil

=== Amenities ===
Anniyur has a well-equipped 24X7 government hospital. It has 30 beds, emergency care unit, x-ray facility, and any time mortal care.

== Education ==
Anniyur and the district it belongs has a low literacy rate. Now the situation is being changed. 2 Panchayat Union Primary schools, 3 Private schools, 3 higher secondary schools are functioning.

Anniyur has three higher secondary schools

1. Government Boys Higher Secondary School
2. Government Girls Higher Secondary School
3. Olive Tree Matriculation Higher Secondary School

Both are run by Government of Tamil Nadu and also have two Government Primary Schools, three private primary schools.

== Transport ==
Anniyur is connected by road transport facility with its district capital Villupuram by four different routes.

1. Villupuram - Soorapattu - Anniyur (Prime route)
2. Villupuram - Kanjanur - Elusempon - Anniyur
3. Villupuram - Kakkanur - T.Kosappalayam - Anniyur
4. Villupuram - Melkaranai - Perungalampoondi - Anniyur.

Anniyur is connected with the nearest cities like Villupuram, Gingee and Thirukovilur.
