= Olakur =

Village in Tamil Nadu (India)

Coordinates: 12°19′N 79°43′E

Olakur is a village in Tamil Nadu located in the Villupuram District. The nearest town to Olakur is Tindivanam.

Olakur railway station is part of the Chennai Suburban Railway.
