= N. Kesavan =

Indian politician (died 2011)

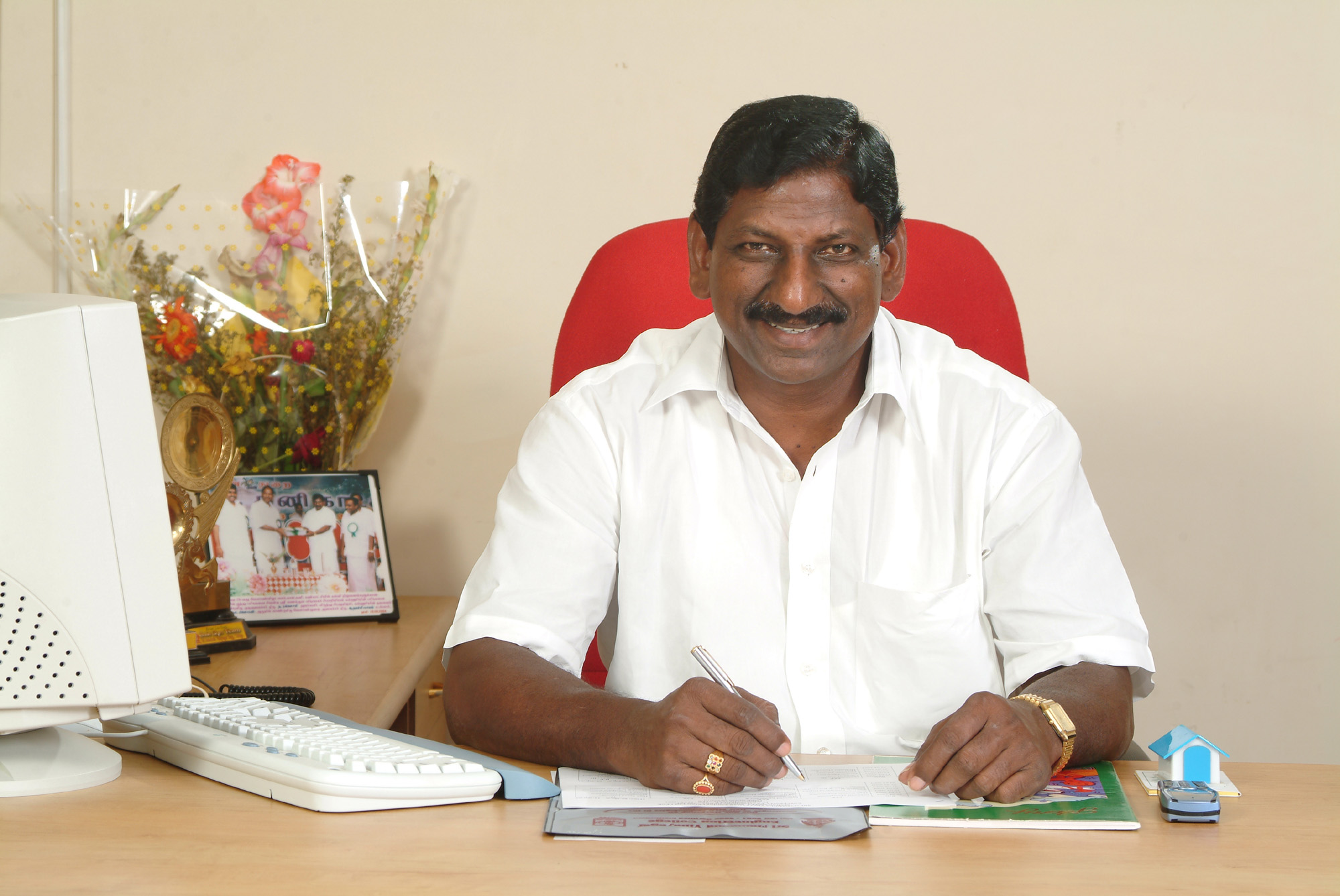

Member of the Puducherry Legislative Assembly
- In office 1996–2001
- Constituency: Lawspet

Personal details
- Born: Puducherry, India
- Died: 6 September 2011

N. Kesavan (died 2011) was an Indian politician from Puducherry. He served as Member of the Legislative Assembly from Lawspet assembly constituency from 1996 to 2001. He was appointed as Government Whip in Puducherry Legislative Assembly during his tenure.

== Sri Manakula Vinayagar Educational Trust ==
In 1996, N. Kesavan formed the Sri Manakula Vinayagar Educational Trust. The trust runs several colleges in Puducherry. Its goal is to provide technical and medical education to the disadvantaged sections of society.

Kesavan was the chairman and managing director of the trust, until his death.

=== Institutions ===
The trust runs the following institutions:

- Sri Manakula Vinayagar Engineering College, Madagadipet, Puducherry
- Manakula Vinayagar Institute of Technology, Kalitheerthalkuppam, Madagadipet, Puducherry
- Sri Manakula Vinayagar Medical College & Hospital, Kalitheerthalkuppam, Madagadipet, Puducherry
- Sri Manakula Vinayagar Nursing College, Kalitheerthalkuppam, Madagadipet, Puducherry
- Sri Manakula Vinayagar Polytechnic College, Kalitheerthalkuppam, Madagadipet, Puducherry
- Venkateswara College of Education & Teacher Training Institute, Kalitheerthalkuppam, Madagadipet, Puducherry
- Sri Manakula Vinayagar School of Arts and Science College
- Sri Manakula Vinayagar School of Allied Health Sciences
- College of Physiotherapy
- School of Agriculture

== Mailam Subramania Swamy Educational Trust ==
Kesavan was also the Former Chairman of Mailam Subramania Swamy Educational Trust which was established in 1996. Mailam Engineering College is an institution formed under this trust.
