= Brahmadesam, Viluppuram taluk =

Coordinates: 12.1975°N 79.7797°E

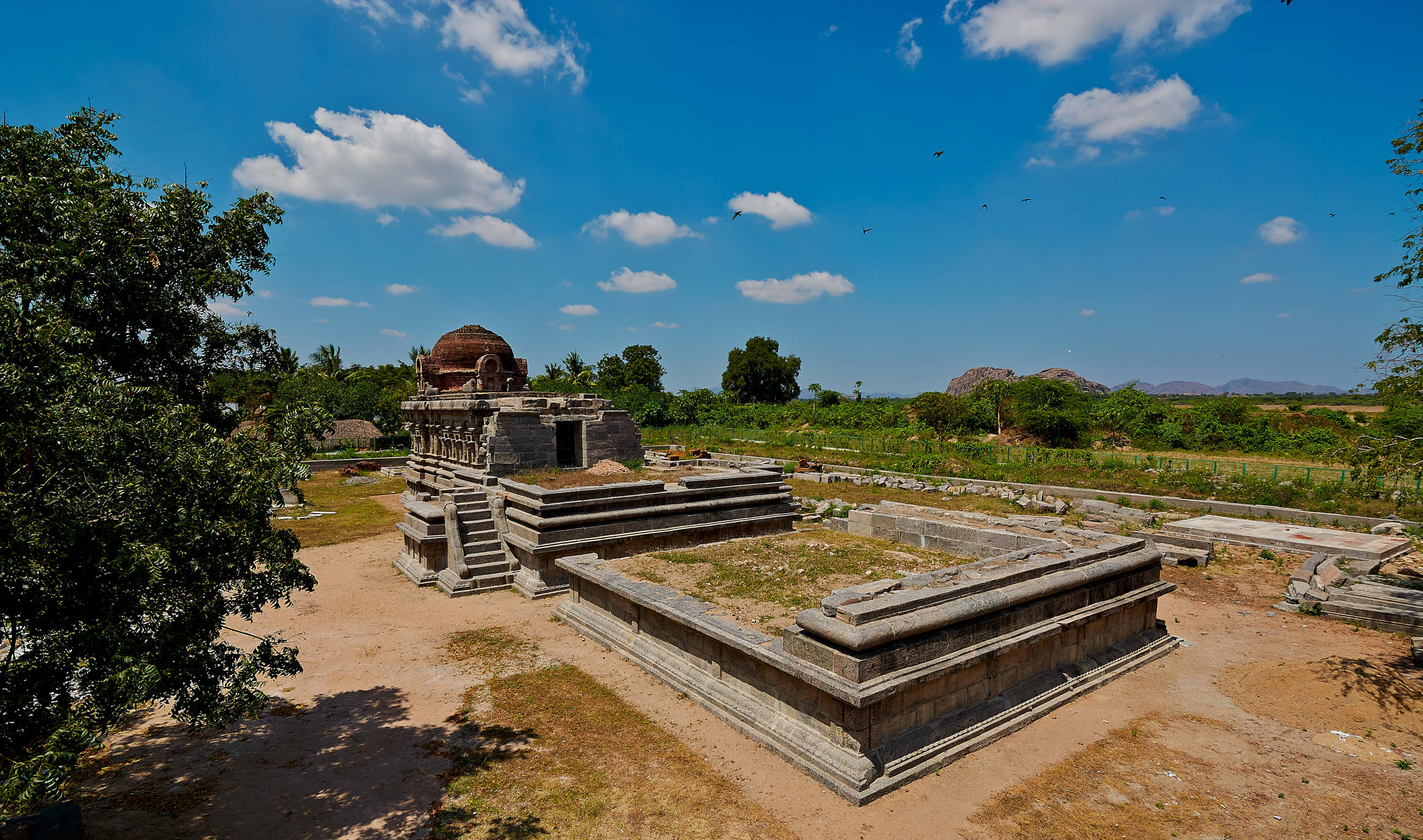
The Patalisvara Temple in Brahmadesam

Brahmadesam is an Indian Panchayat village located in Viluppuram taluk of Viluppuram district in the state of Tamil Nadu. As of the 2001 census, the village had a population of 1986, with a literacy rate of 59%. The two temples in the village Brahmapurisvara Temple and Patalisvara Temple are among the Archaeological Survey of India's list of monuments.
