= Anumandai =

- Village
- Location in Tamil Nadu, India Anumandai (India)
- Coordinates: 12°13′10″N 79°59′52″E
- Country: India
- State: Tamil Nadu
- District: Viluppuram

Population (2011)
  - Total: 6,539
- Time zone: UTC+5:30 (IST)
- PIN: 604303
- Area code: +91-4147
- Vehicle registration: TN-16
- Nearest city: Pondicherry (24 km), Chennai (about 143 km)
- Lok Sabha constituency: Villupuram
- Website: www.anumandai.in

Population by gender
Female	3290	(50.3%)
Male	3249	(49.7%)
- Source: 2011 India Census

Anumandai is a village panchayat located in the Marakkanam Taluk, Viluppuram district, Tamil Nadu, India. It is one of the village panchayats coming under Marakkanam block of Viluppuram district.

== Businesses ==
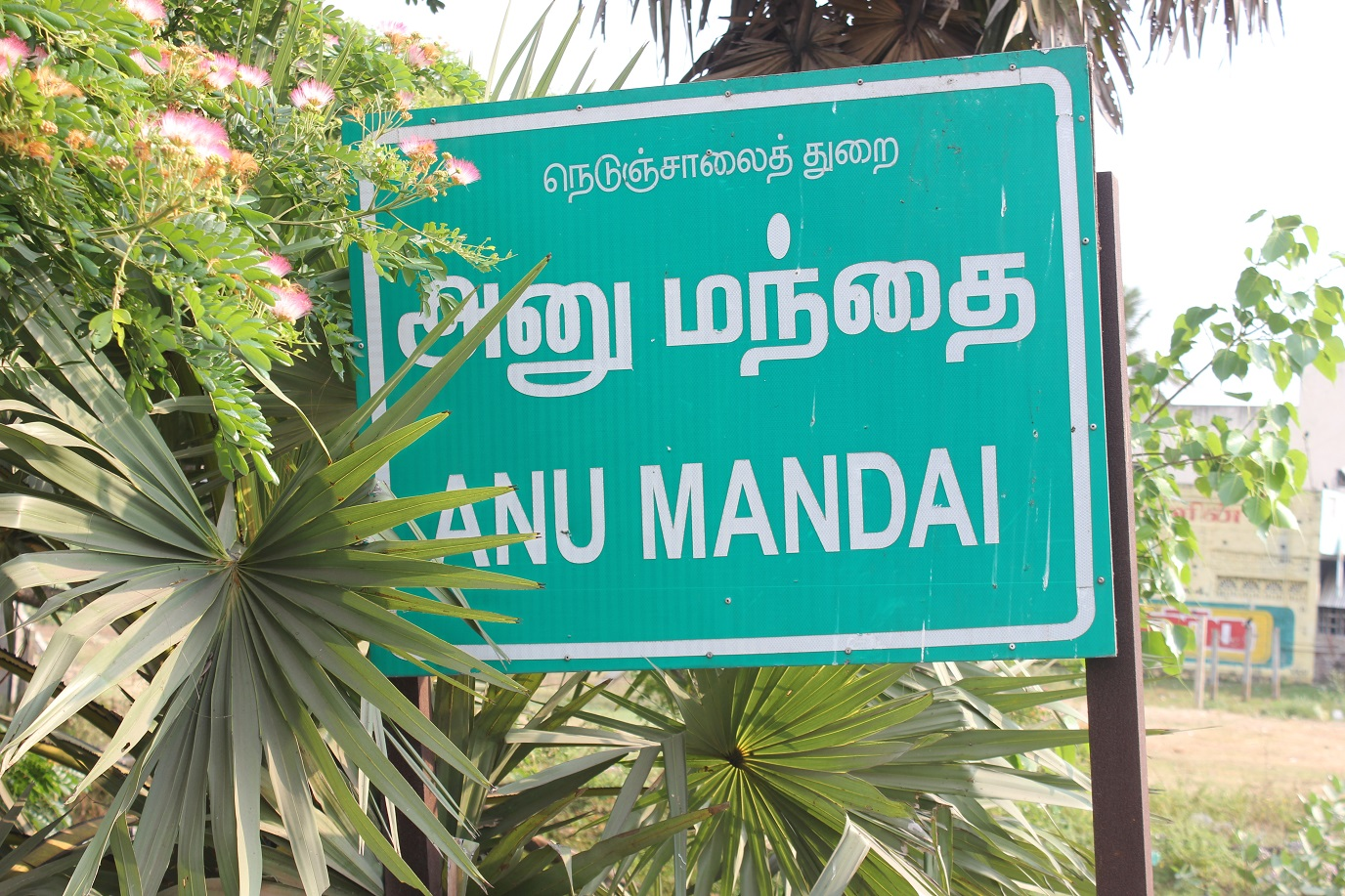
Anumandai name board

Anumandai has two banks namely, Pallavan Grama Bank and Co-operative Bank.
