= Neganur =

- Location in Neganur, Tamil Nadu, India
- 12.293785°N 79.4565395°E
- Location: Gingee, India

Neganur Village is a 6.5 square kilometres (2.5 sq mi) village in Gingee taluk, Villupuram District in the India state of Tamil Nadu. The main activity is cultivating agricultural crops such as rice and groundnut.

== Location ==
Neganur is located 7 kilometres (4.3 mi) northeast of Gingee. People can take the 268,9 and Veerappa transport buses to reach the village, the maximum travel time will be 20 minutes from Gingee town.

Melkalavai (3 km), Perumpugai (3 km), Chellapiratti (3 km), Aviyur (4 km), Anangoor (4 km) are the nearby villages to Neganur. Neganur is surrounded by Gingee Block towards west, Melmalayanur Block towards west, Thellar Block towards North, Tindivanam Block towards East.

Tindivanam, Vandavasi, Viluppuram, Tiruvannamalai are the nearby cities to Neganur.

This place is in the border of the Villupuram District and Tiruvannamalai District. Tiruvannamalai District Thellar is north towards this place.

== Festival ==
Amman Temple:-

Neganur Village used to celebrate the Amman Temple festival every year during the months of April and May, it will be celebrated for one full day.

Neganur Pudur village celebrate the Poniyamman temple festival every year.

== Gallery ==
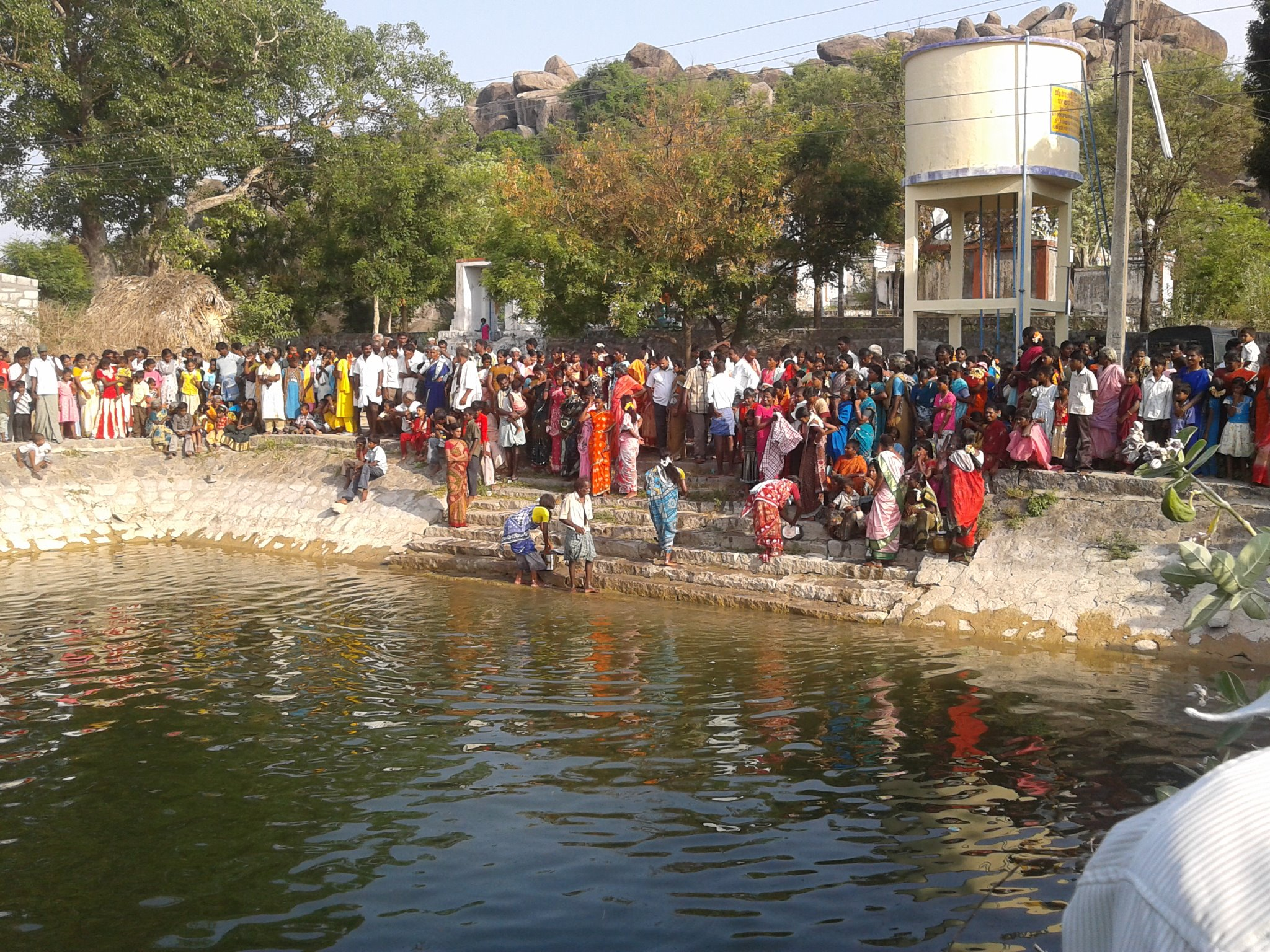
Neganur Marriyamman Temple celebration-2011

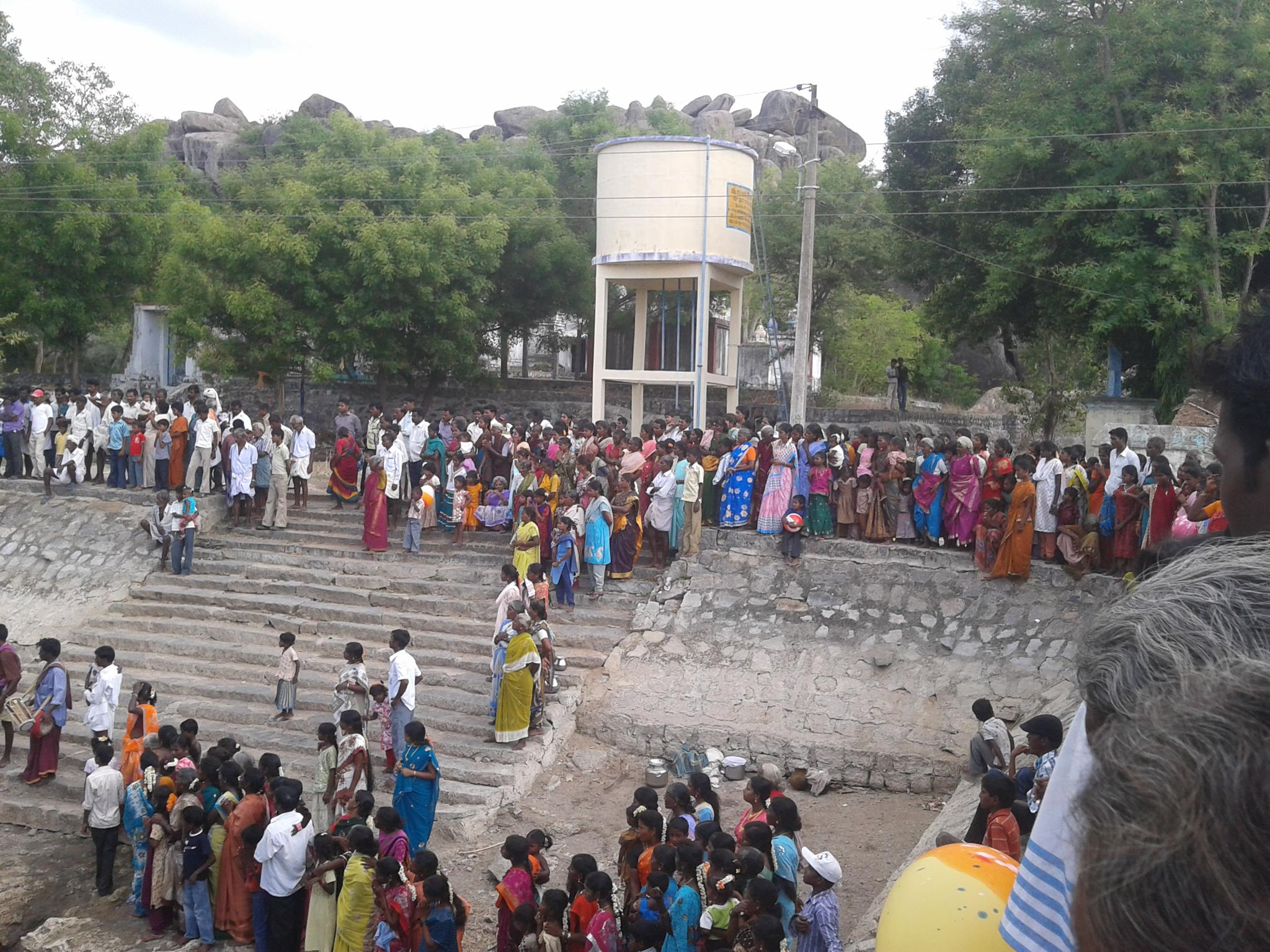
Neganur Marriyamman Temple celebration-2012

== History & Culture ==
2,200-year-old Tamil-Brahmi inscription found on Neganur pudur.

== Neganur Pudur main temples ==
Neganur pudur main temples:

- Ponniyamman temple
- Vinayagar temple
- Kannika parameshwari
- Venkateswara temple

== Neganur 2011 Census Details ==
Neganur Local Language is Tamil. Neganur Village Total population is 3451 and number of houses are 895. Female Population is 48.5%. Village literacy rate is 65.4% and the Female Literacy rate is 26.8%.

== Population ==
Census Parameter Census Data

Total Population 3451

Total No of Houses 895

Female Population % 48.5% ( 1674)

Total Literacy rate % 65.4% ( 2258)

Female Literacy rate 26.8% ( 925)

Scheduled Tribes Population % 1.0% ( 36)

Scheduled Caste Population % 10.4% ( 360)

Working Population % 52.1%

Child(0 -6) Population by 2011 328

Girl Child(0 -6) Population % by 2011 47.9% ( 157)
