= Nangathur =

- Village
- Location in Tamil Nadu, India Nangathur (India)
- Coordinates: 12.08°N 79.499°E
- Country: India
- State: Tamil Nadu
- District: Villupuram

Languages
  - Official: Tamil
- Time zone: UTC+5:30 (IST)
- PIN: 605202

Nangathur is a village located in between Villupuram and Ginge. It is 23 km away from Villupuram and 15 km away from Ginge. PIN Code:605202. It is in Villupuram District and Vikravandi Taluk. People of various religions are living happily with a strong unity. It's a fast developing rural area among the other villages around it. A very big Lake is there available for feeding the farms in and around nangathur. There are two other water reservoirs available here. Most of the people are farmers.

== Education ==
The overall literacy rate was recorded as 86.03% in the 2011 Indian census. There are two schools available in Nanagthur:

1. Government Primary school, Nangathur, which has nearly 160 children from first standard to fifth standard.

2. St. Mary's High School, Nangathur, which is run by the Roman Catholic Church, and has nearly 500 students from first standard to tenth standard. Students from nearby villages like Mathur, Sangeethamangalam, Nagar are also studying here. It is known locally as a great place for developing skills and knowledge for the local younth.

3. There are many native Catholic Priests from this village working in different parts of the world engaging themselves in educational service, social upliftment and spiritual enhancement of peoples. There are also many catholic nuns from this village working in different parts of the Country and the world serving for the educational, medical and social welfare of people, especially the poor and the downtrodden.

4. The Catholics are 100% literate in the village. it is due to the educational facilities available for them since four generation. Thanks to the French Missionaries for their foresightedness in bringing school to the village.

5. The Catholic hamlet (Then Nangathur) is a classical example of education bringing transformation in just two generations. The children of the soil are serving in many fields in many parts of the world.

6. St. MARY's middle school of Nangathur started in the year 1906. It has successfully completed its 106th year in 2015. During this 106 years this humble primary school has produced all kinds of people. From catechist to cardinal, Priests, Nuns, Doctors, Doctorates, Bankers, Military personnel, lawyers, professors, a good number of Teachers, Managers, Several state/central government servants, etc. 7. St. Marys High School of Nangathur started in the year 1999. And for the last two academic years, i.e. 2017 & 2018 the school results in SSLC examination is 100%.

== Region and economy ==
Nangathur is a mixture of both Hindus and Christians - Roman Catholics. While most of the Hindu families are agriculturists, most of the Christian families are either teachers or Army personnel. They live depending on each other. Economically the Christian part is better due to the regular government salaries and pensions.

The youth go outside the village for their studies and jobs. The granite mountains all around the village made it difficult to have easy access and hence until recently there were no buses, no road facilities and transportation was difficult. Presently the town bus access helps the people a lot for access for studies, jobs etc.

== Transport ==
There are two bus routes that connect the village with nearby the towns of Villupuram and Gingee. The 15A bus runs from Villupuram to Sangeethamangalam vai Nangathur. The 27 bus runs from Villupuram to south Nangathur via Kalyanampoondi.

However, despite the transport problem Nangathurians has seen the world long long ago. Many fought in WWI and WWII and sacrificed their lives. Few fought in the Indo-Pakistan, i.e. Kargil War. Once Nangathur was very famous for military services. There were Havildars, Subedars, Majors, captains, and slowly people have opted other civil services and government services.
