= Meenambur =

Village in Tamil Nadu India

Meenambur is a small village in Gingee taluk, Viluppuram district in the state of Tamil Nadu, India. It lies 151 kilometres (94 mi) south of the state capital at Chennai. The closest town to the village is Gingee, which is 5 kilometres (3.1 mi) away, whereas the district headquarters of Viluppuram is 34 kilometres (21 mi) distant.
