= Veedur =

Veedur is a village panchayat in the Viluppuram district of Tamil Nadu state, India. It is the largest village by area and population in the district. National Highway No. 45, from Chennai to Dindigul via Tiruchirapalli, goes through the hamlet.

Veedur lies in the northeast part of Tamil Nadu, between Chennai and Villupuram. It is 142 km (101 mi) south of Chennai and 50 km (98 mi) north of Pondicherry. The surrounding area has many bodies of water, forests, farmland, and vegetation, as well as Veedur Dam, which is built at the confluence of two area rivers. The Mailam temple of Lord Murgaa is c. 10 km from Veedur.

Politically, Veedur is part of Arani (Lok Sabha constituency) constituency and the Mailam State Assembly constituency.

The village is secular, but a majority of residents are Hindus and Jains. The village is known for Shivan kovil and Adhinath Bhagavan Jain Temple, both at least 1200 yrs). The village also contains a church and facilities dedicated to demigods like Ayyanarappan. In addition, Veedur is known in the field of religious literature.

The town's main economy is agriculture. Their crops are Paddy, Sugarcane, Jasmine Flower and other grams.
