= Pettai, Villupuram =

Pettai
- village
- Location within Tamil Nadu Location within India
- Coordinates: 12°13′45″N 79°15′28″E
- Country: India
- State: Tamil Nadu
- District: Villupuram
- Taluka: Gingee

Population (2011)
  - Total: 1,929
- Time zone: UTC+5:30 (IST)

Pettai is a panchayat village in the southern state of Tamil Nadu. Administratively, Pettai is under the Gingee Taluk of Villupuram District, Tamil Nadu. Pettai is 18.5 km by road west of the village of Gingee, and 24 km east of the town of Tiruvannamalai.

There is one village in SE. Pettai gram panchayat: Pettai. In the 2011 census 1,929 people were recorded as living in Pettai village.
