= Perani =

Village in Tamil Nadu, India

Coordinates: 12°06′N 79°33′E

Perani is a village near Tindivanam in Viluppuram district, Tamil Nadu, India, and has a railway station in the south line of Chennai Suburban Railway.
