= Melpathy =

Melpathy or Melpathi, is a village in Viluppuram district located between Chennai and Tanjur National Highway NH45C and close to Puducherry and Villupuram.

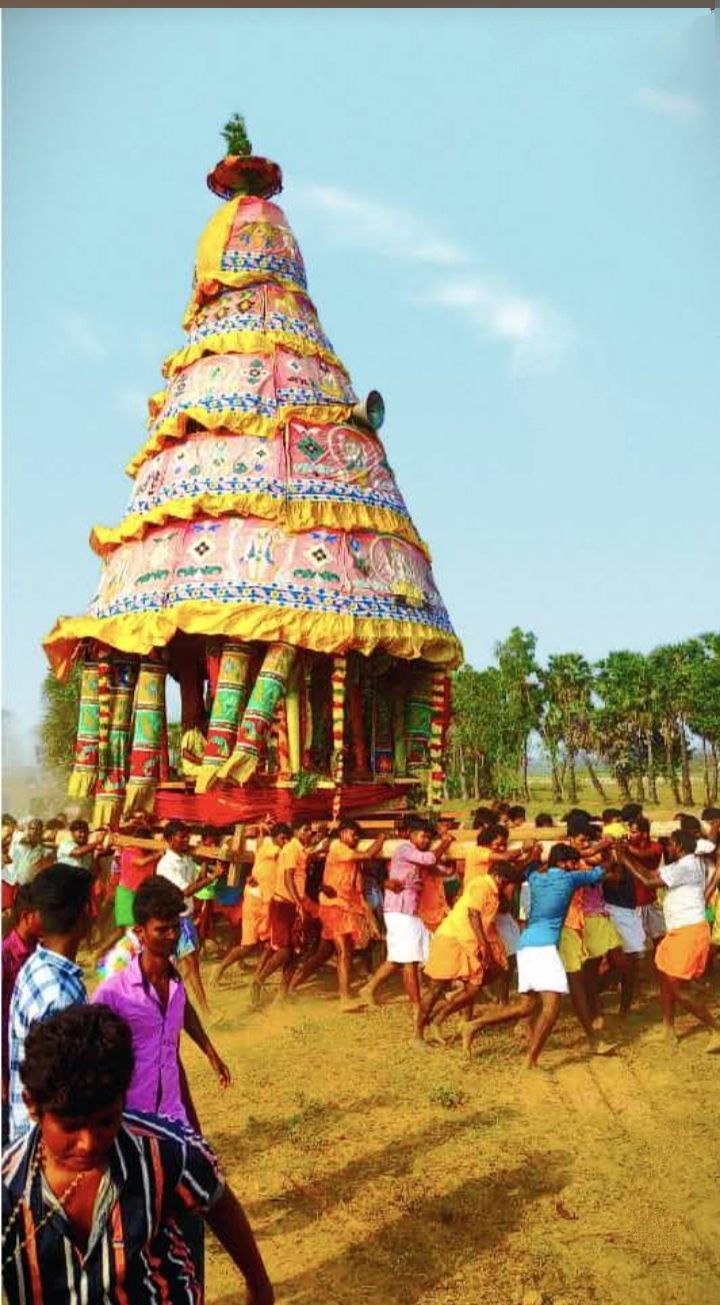
