= Sathiyamangalam, Viluppuram =

Sathiyamangalam Sakthipuram
- village
- Country: India
- State: Tamil Nadu
- District: Villupuram

Government
  - Panchayat President: S.L.AbarnaRavisankar MBA

Population (2001)
  - Total: 3,355

Languages
  - Official: Tamil
- Time zone: UTC+5:30 (IST)
- Postal code: 604153
- Website: http://kaliamman.beep.com

Sathiyamangalam is a village in the Gingee Taluk of Villupuram district, Tamil Nadu, India. Sathiyamangalam is located at a distance of 12 km from Gingee, its nearest town. Sri kaliamman Alayam is most popular one. The Sakthi Kaliamman Temple is a Hindu temple dedicated to the goddess Kaliamma located in the village of Sathiyamangalam in the Gingee taluk of Villupuram District, India. The Pongal festival and the annual Vigasi festivals are important festivals celebrated.

== History ==
This temple was athi sakthi birthplace so that only the village name is Sathiyamangalam. Sathiyamangalam have many stories.

== Deities ==
The prime deity is Kaliamman. The temple is open to devotees only thrice a week – Thursday, Friday and Sunday. [1] It is believed that the main deity, all day kaliamman stay there.

== Festivals ==
A Pongal festival is held annually during the month of January. During the festival, the idol of goddess Kaliamman is brought from the temple one day thiru veethi ula. The pongal-festival is a part of the annual festival that is celebrated for a period of 3 days. A yearly once Annual festival has been performed during every year" Vaikasi" around 22nd date Tamil month.

== Demographics ==
As per the 2001 census, Sathiyamangalam had a total population of 3355. with 1678 males and 1677 females. Out of the total population 1903 people were literate.
