= Nandan canal =

Waterway in Tamil Nadu, India

The Nandan Canal, located in the Tiruvannamalai and Vilupuram districts of Tamil Nadu, India, is a 200-year-old waterway constructed during the British period. It serves as a lifeline for 120 villages in these districts through which it flows. The Keeranur Dam, from which the Nandan Canal originates, is constructed at a place called Sammandanur, where the Olaiyaru and Thurinjalaru rivers converge.

The Nandan Canal branches off from the Keeranur Dam in the Tiruvannamalai district, extending for approximately 38 kilometers, and reaches up to the Panamalai Pettai Lake near Gingee in the Villupuram district.

There is an ongoing expectation that the Cheyyar-Pennaiyar Link Canal will be excavated and connected to the Nandan Canal. This would not only resolve the drinking water issues for over 60 villages but also benefit 10,000 acres of agricultural land. The excess water released from the Sathanur Dam currently flows into the sea via the South Pennaiyar River. If this water is diverted through a canal for about 16.40 kilometers, approximately 10 TMC (thousand million cubic feet) of water could be utilized.
