= Aruvapakkam =

- village
- Country: India
- State: Tamil Nadu
- District: Villupuram District

Population (2001)
  - Total: 1,800

Languages
  - Official: Tamil
- Time zone: UTC+5:30 (IST)
- PIN: 604102
- Vehicle registration: TN-16
- Nearest city: Pondicherry (30 km), Chennai (about 150 km)
- Sex ratio: 103 ♂/♀
- Literacy: 51.04 %%
- Lok Sabha constituency: Villupuram

Aruvapakkam is an Indian Panchayat village located in Vanur taluk of Villupuram district in the state of Tamil Nadu. Its PIN code is 604001.
