= Nangilikondan =

Coordinates: 12.25270°N 79.45055°E

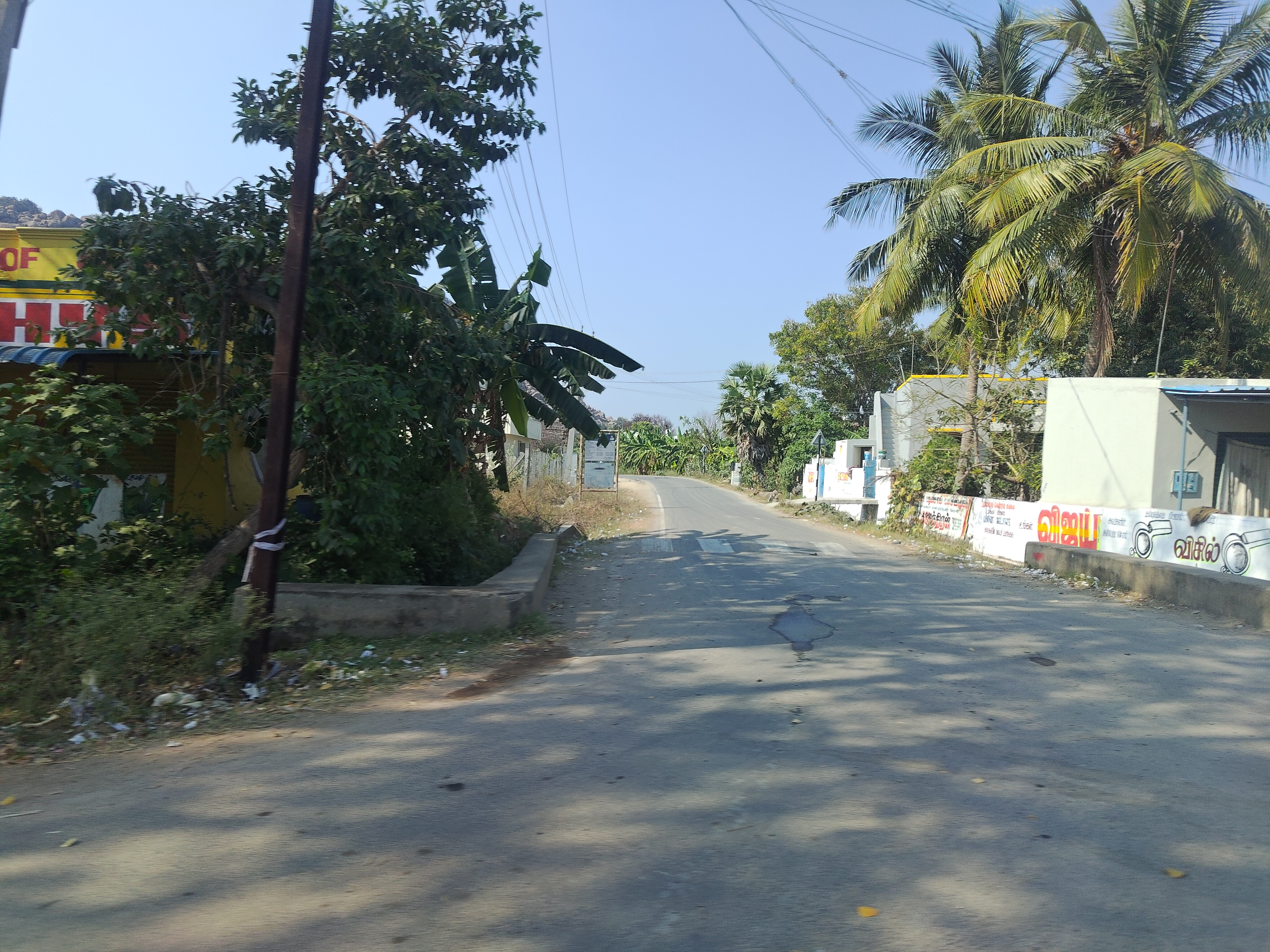
Road in Nangilikondan.

Nangilickondan (also called Nangilickondan) is a village in Villupuram district, Tamil Nadu. It has located between Gingee and Tindivanam road. It is about 20 km (12 mi) far away from Tindivanam and about 8 km (5.0 mi) away from Gingee. The village is patrolled by Gingee police. Nearest railway station is in Tindivanam. Nearest Airport is Chennai about 145 km.
