= Satta Panchayat Iyakkam =

Satta panchayat Iyakkam
- Formation: 2015
- Founder: Siva Elango, Senthil Arumugam
- Founded at: Chennai, Tamil Nadu
- Purpose: Promote the rule-of-law, anti-corruption, liquor prohibition and good governance
- Location: India
- Key people: Siva Elango, Senthil Arumugam
- Website: https://www.sattapanchayat.org/

Satta panchayat Iyakkam (SPI) is a social organisation founded in 2013 in Chennai, India, which campaigns against corruption and in favour of liquor prohibition.

== History ==
SPI runs a call centre to help the people of Tamil Nadu obtain Government services without corruption and bribery. The SPI call centre also provides assistance and advice related to government procedures. SPI handled over 100,000 calls from 2019 to 2021. Every Saturday, the members meet for a camp organized by the organization where retired government officials and lawyers offer administrative and legal assistance, steered by the Treasurer, Srinivasan, and a retired Deputy Collector.

SPI filed a PIL to force Village Administrative Officers (VAOs) to remain in their villages and serve the people, rather than visiting only occasionally. The Chennai High court made it mandatory for all VAOs to stay in their respective villages, though many did not comply with this ruling. SPI continues to campaign on this issue, and filed a PIL to enact the "Right to Services Act" to ensure time-bound service delivery from government officials.

SPI has been campaigning against liquor since its formation, via public outreach and the organization of protests in front of liquor shops.

"Urimai Kural" is a program run by the organization to educate citizens about their rights and be able to file RTI.

Executives Senthil Arumugam, Siva Elango and Jai Ganesh lead SPI activities as full-time staff. SPI wings include Research, Technical, Design, Women, and Student wings to enable the organisation's functioning. SPI has a significant presence in Chennai, Madurai, Nellai, Erode, and Villupuram districts.
