= Vadambalam =

Vadavambalam is one of the villages in Kandamangalam Taluk in the Villupuram District of India's Tamil Nadu State. This village surrounded both side rivers. In this village most of people doing agricultural. The famous Lakshmi narasimma temple. poovarasankuppam located near this village. More than 15 temples in the village. More than 500 years historical Siva Temple in vadavambalam. From vadavambalam puvarasankuppam lakshmi narasima just 2 kilometer. The grand festival of the village is selva ganapathi vinayagar temple festival. Conducted by selva ganapathi nanbargal kuzhu vadavambalam.

== Location ==
Vadavambalam is located 13.9 km distance from its Taluk Main Town Kandamangalam. Vadavambalam is 14.1 km far from its District Main City Villupuram. It is 152 km far from Chennai.

The village has an Adhistanam temple for Sri Atma Bodhendra Saraswathi, the 58th pontiff of the Kanchi_Matha.
