= Pombur =

Coordinates: 12°02′N 79°36′E

- village
- Interactive map of Pombur
- Country: India
- State: Tamil Nadu

Languages
  - Official: Tamil
- Time zone: UTC+5:30 (IST)

Pombur is an Indian village near Vikravandi. It is located between three towns Villupuram, Pondicherry and Tindivanam.
