= Kottakarai =

Coordinates: 12°00′43.8″N 79°47′48.8″E

Kottakarai is an Indian village in Villupuram district of Tamil Nadu. The village is called Kottakarai because kottai means palace in English. In this village there is a big lake. This village is located near to Auroville which is an international township city.
