= Panchalam =

Panchalam is a village in Viluppuram district, Tamil Nadu, India, to the south line of Chennai Suburban Railway.
