= Viranamur =

Village in Tamil Nadu

Coordinates: 12°20′0″N 79°30′41″E

Viranamur is a village in the southern state Tamil Nadu in India. It is located in Gingee Taluk, Villupuram District of Tamil Nadu.
