= Andikuli =

Andikuli is a village in Viluppuram district, Tamil Nadu, India. According to the 2011 Census of India, it has a total population of 1,217: 658 males and 559 females.
