= Kappur =

- Village Panchayat
- Location in Tamil Nadu, India Kappur (India)
- Coordinates: 11.9131178°N 79.4155261°E
- Country: India
- State: Tamil Nadu
- District: Villupuram

Government
  - Village President: Govindasamy
- Elevation: 171 m (561 ft)

Population (2001)
  - Total: 5,000

Languages
  - Official: Tamil
- Time zone: UTC+5:30 (IST)
- PIN: 605301
- Vehicle registration: TN-32

Kappur is a Village Panchayat in Villupuram District, in the Indian state of Tamil Nadu. It serves as the headquarters of Kappur Panchayat which includes Nerkunam, Kuchipalyam, Govindapuram. The village's main source of income is agriculture. Its literacy rate was low until the early 1980s, but has since improved constantly and is currently above 60%. This village has many government offices such as post office and banks.
