= Kil Sevalambady =

- Village
- Location in Tamil Nadu, India
- Coordinates: 12.3851175°N 79.3984700°E
- Country: India
- State: Tamil Nadu
- District: Villupuram district
- Named for: Sevalambady

Government
  - Type: Tamil Nadu Government

Languages
  - Official: Tamil
- Time zone: UTC+5:30 (IST)
- PIN: 604 208
- Telephone code: 04145
- Vehicle registration: TN 16
- Nearest city: Chetpet
- Lok Sabha constituency: Arani
- Vidhan Sabha constituency: Gingee
- Taluk: Melmalaiyanur

Kil Sevalambady is a village located in Viluppuram District Melmalaiyanur Taluk, Peruvalur Post, State Tamil Nadu, India. Placed in rural part of Viluppuram district in Tamil Nadu, it is one of the 79 villages in Melmalayanur Panchayat Union, Vadavetti Panchayat in Viluppuram district. As per the government records, the village number is Sevalambadi (Kil) in 632302.The village has 264 houses.

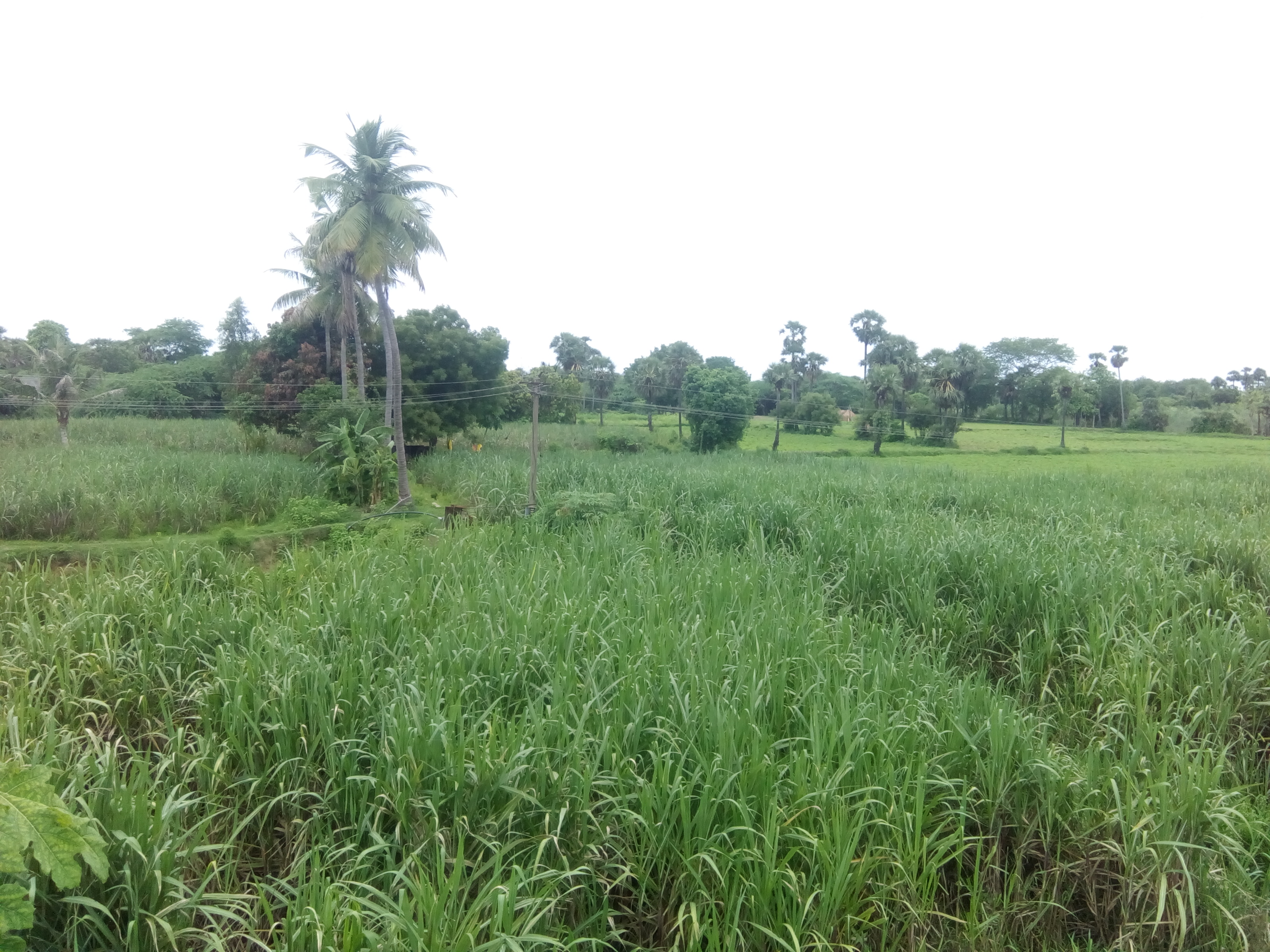

Nearest Hospital Valathi (8.4 km), Nearest Police Station Valathi (8.4 km), Nearest Fire office Melmalaiyanur (13.3), Nearest Petrol Bunk Valathi (7.3 km), Nearest Railway Station Polur (41 km), Nearest Airport is Chennai (Meenapakkam) (129), Nearest Harbour in Chennai (146 km). Nearest city such as Thiruvannamalai (46.7 km), Villupuram (59.5 km), Vellore (74.5 km), Kanchipuram (74.5 km), Pondicherry (80.4 km), Thiruvallur (121 km), Chennai (146 km). Nearest tourist Places Gingee Fort (22 km), Melmalaiyanur Angalamman Temple (13.3 km), Thiruvannamalai Arunachaleswarar Temple (46.7 km), Pondicherry (80.4 km), Vedanthangal Bird Sanctuary (70 km), Mahabalipuram (114 km), Vandalur Zoo (119 km).

== Population ==
According to the 2011 census, Sevalambadi (Kil)'s population is 1023. Out of this, 519 are males whereas the females count 504 here. This village has 99 children in the age group of 0–6 years. Out of this 62 are boys and 37 are girls.

== Literacy rate 2008 ==
Literacy rate in Sevalambadi (Kil) village is 63%. 649 out of total 1023 population is educated here. In males the literacy rate is 69% as 362 males out of total 519 are literate however female literacy rate is 56% as 287 out of total 504 females are literate in this Village. The dark portion is that illiteracy rate of Sevalambadi (Kil) village is 36%. Here 374 out of total 1023 persons are illiterate. Male illiteracy rate here is 30% as 157 males out of total 519 are uneducated. In females the illiteracy rate is 43% and 217 out of total 504 females are illiterate in this village.

The number of employed individual of Sevalambadi (Kil) village is 671 while 352 are non-working. And out of 671 employed people 610 peoples are entirely reliant on farming.
