= Vikravandi =

- town
- Location in Tamil Nadu, India
- Coordinates: 12.03°N 79.55°E
- Country: India
- State: Tamil Nadu
- District: Viluppuram

Government
  - Type: town

Area
  - Total: 12.22 km^{2} (4.72 sq mi)
- Elevation: 44 m (144 ft)

Population (2021)
  - Total: 33,447
  - Density: 2,737/km^{2} (7,089/sq mi)

Languages
  - Official: Tamil
- Time zone: UTC+5:30 (IST)
- Postal code: 605652
- Vehicle registration: TN-32

Vikravandi is a developing town and suburb of city of Villupuram in the Indian state of Tamil Nadu.

== Geography ==
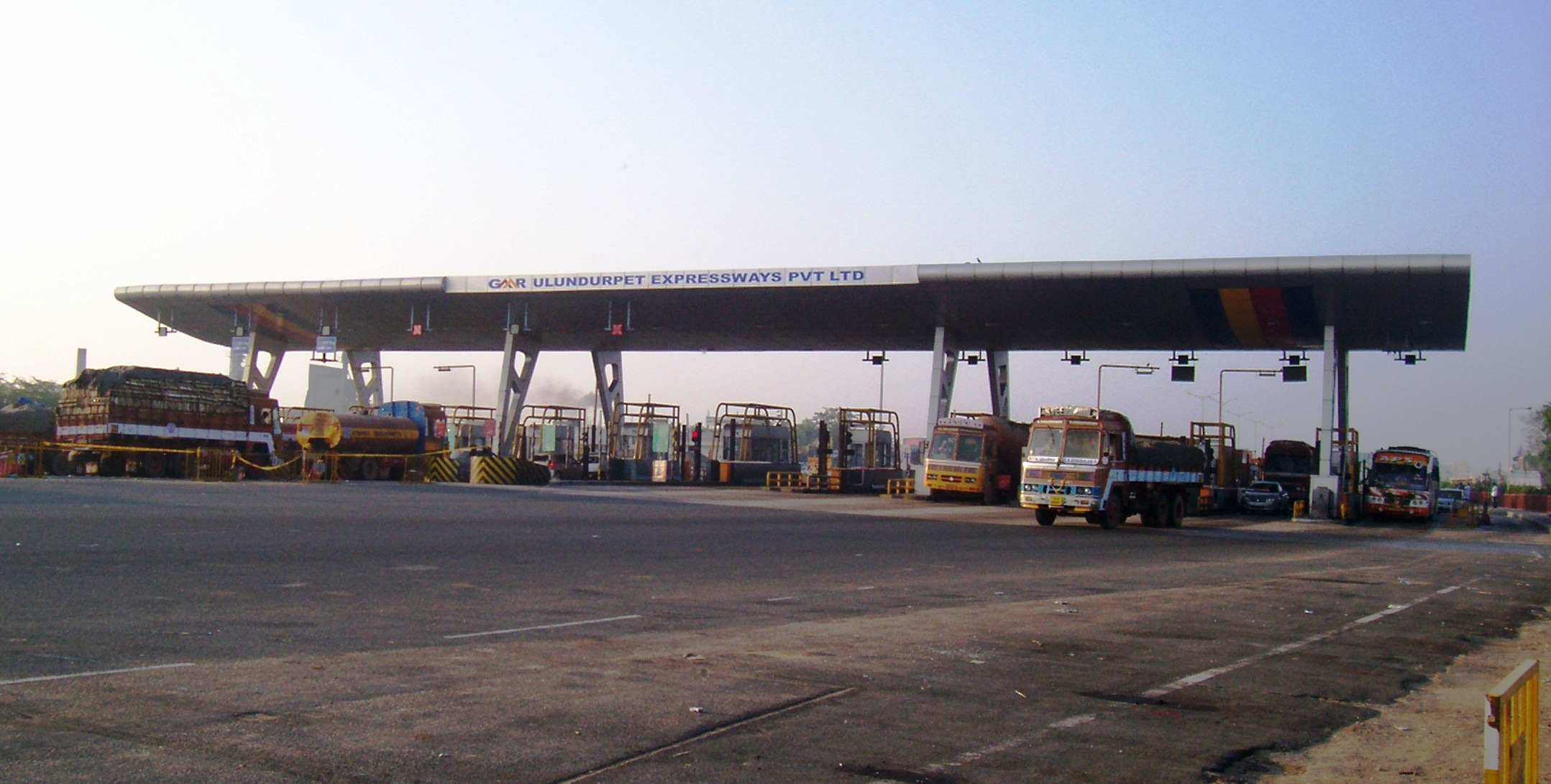
Toll Plaza at Vikravandi

Vikravandi is located at 12.03°N 79.55°E. It has an average elevation of 44 metres (144 feet). The National Highway NH 132 connects Villupuram and Tindivanam, passes through Vikravandi and NH 36 connects Vikravandi and Manamadurai through Kumbakonam, Thanjavur and Pudukkotai. It is located at the distance of 154 km from Chennai, 14 km from Villupuram and 35 km from Pondicherry.

== Demographics ==
As of 2001 India census, Vikravandi had a population of 10,141. Males constitute 52% of the population and females 48%. Vikravandi has an average literacy rate of 74%, higher than the national average of 59.5%: male literacy is 81%, and female literacy is 66%. In Vikravandi, 10% of the population is under 6 years of age.

== Transport ==
=== Road ===
NH 36 connects Vikravandi and Manamadurai via Panruti – Neyveli – Kumbakonam - Thanjavur - Pudukottai bypasses Villupuram at 5 km in Koliyanur.
