= Kozhipattu =

- village
- Country: India
- State: Tamil Nadu
- District: Viluppuram

Languages
  - Official: Tamil
- Time zone: UTC+5:30 (IST)

Kozhipattu is a small village located in Kanai block in Viluppuram District in the Indian state of Tamil Nadu.
