= Annamputhur =

Village in India

- Interactive map of Annamputhur
- Coordinates: 12°10′1″N 79°40′26″E
- Country: India
- State: Tamil Nadu
- District: Viluppuram
- Revenue block: Marakkanam

Annamputhur is a village panchayat in the Marakkanam block, Viluppuram district, Tamil Nadu, India. The panchayat is known for Srinidheeswarar temple and a huge Shivalinga that people of this area have had reconstructed with the help of the Archaeological Survey of India.
