= Mugaiyur =

Mugai (bud) + Oor (a small settlement or village)

Coordinates: 11°58′N 79°19′E

Mugaiyur is one of the blocks in Viluppuram District, Tamil Nadu, India.

== Etymology ==
The name Mugaiyur means mugai (bud) + oor (a small settlement or village). The story goes like this: the ruler of Tirukoilur, Malayaman Thirumudikkaari used to get flower buds from this village for pujas performed in the temple in Tirukoilur. Still there are evidences which suggest there had been a 'Poonthottam'(Flower Garden) from which buds had been sent to the Temple.

- Mugaiyur: This is a geographical location in Tamil Nadu.
- "Mugai": This Tamil word means "bud," signifying a nascent or developing stage.
- "Oor": This Tamil word means "village" or "settlement".
- Mugaiyur Stories: This suggests that the stories are either originating from or are about this specific place, Mugaiyur.
- Possible Interpretations: The stories could be about the history of the village, local legends, or folklore passed down through generations. The "bud" aspect of the name could also be a metaphor for something new or emerging, potentially influencing the themes or narratives within the stories.
- Historical Significance: Mugaiyur has a history that includes being a French colony and having a Chola-era temple, which was reconstructed after being damaged by natural calamities.
- Cultural Heritage:
  - The town boasts a strong cultural heritage, with influences from both French and Tamil traditions.
- Natural Beauty:
  - Mugaiyur is surrounded by lush greenery and offers a peaceful escape with its beaches and backwaters.
- Community:
  - Mugaiyur has a strong sense of community and is known for its patriotic residents who have a high representation in the Indian Army.

== Politics ==
The Mugaiyur assembly constituency has been clubbed into the Tirukoilur constituency.

https://en.wikipedia.org/w/index.php?title=Mugaiyur_Assembly_constituency&oldid=1303078634

== History ==
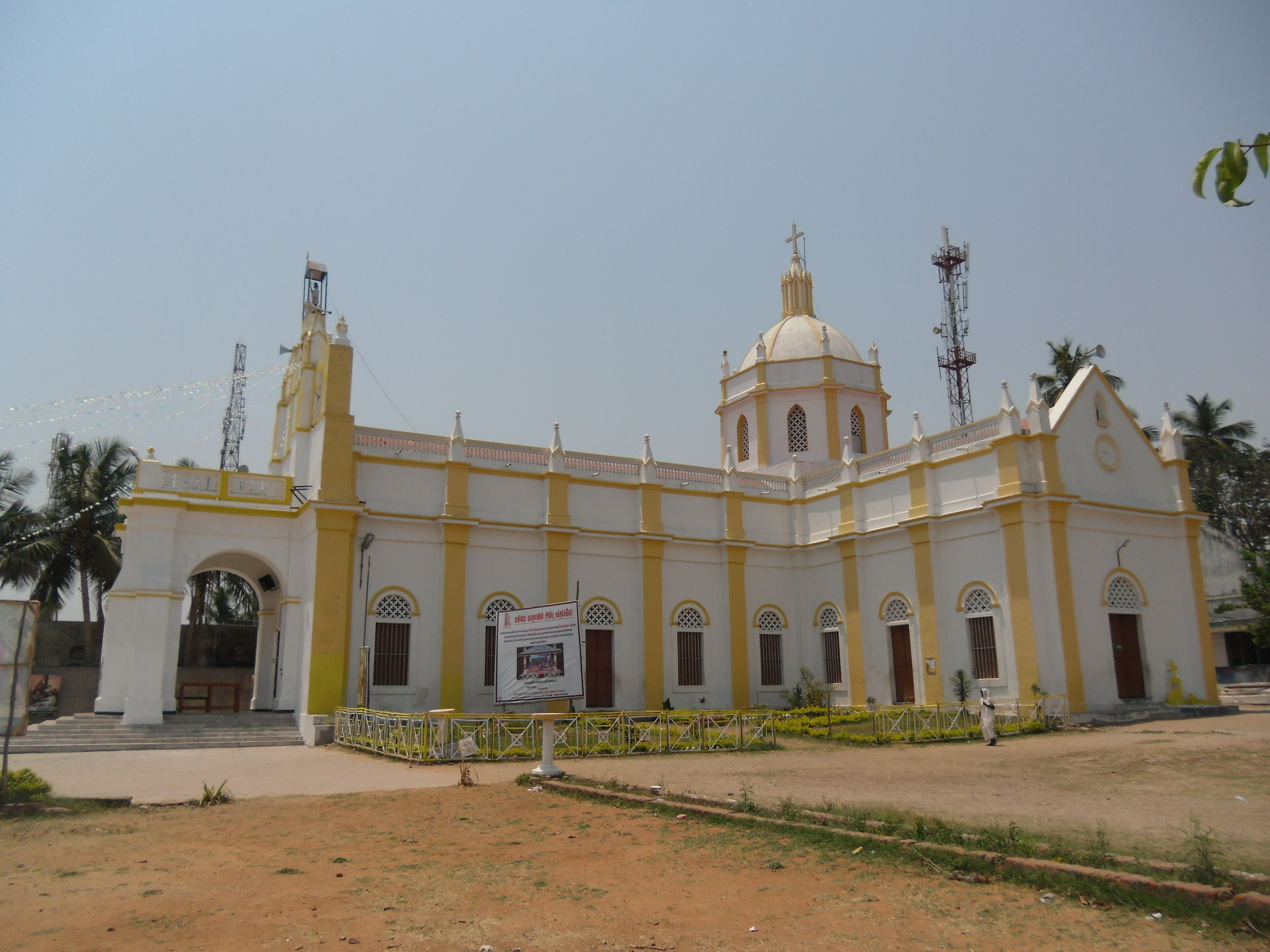

Mugaiyur is one of the earlier Christian Missionary foot-holds in Northern Tamil Nadu. It has a 125-year-old church whose patron saint is St.Xavier. Demographically the Christian population of Mugaiyur is slightly higher than that of the Hindus. This parish has given a large number of priests and nuns, many of whom are now in European countries engaged in missionary activities. The parish is also known as Mugaiyur Mahimai Matha Shrine.

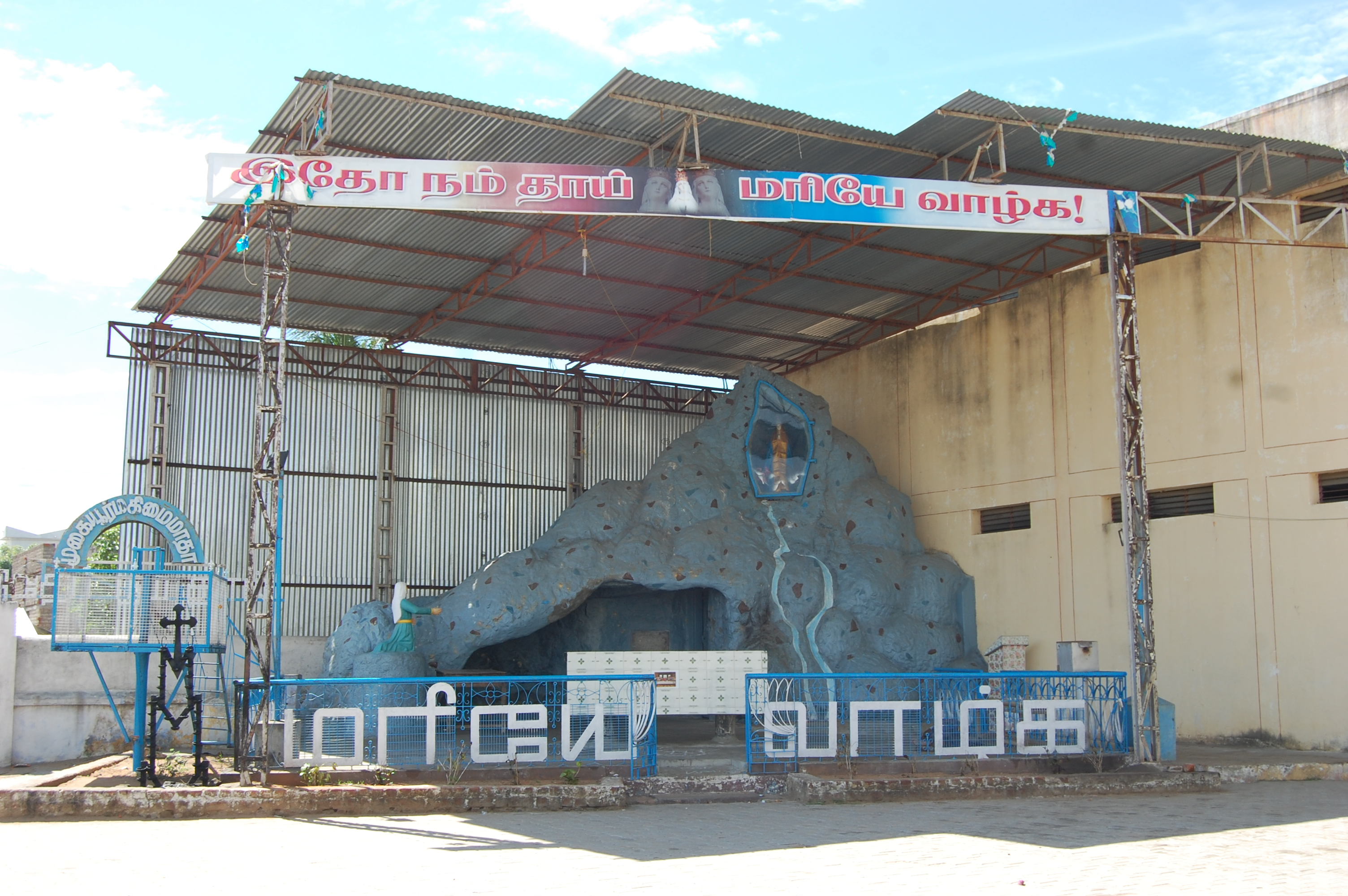

Some 25 years back after the apparition of Our Lady, the parish became famous for the miraculous, powerful and immediate intercession of Mugaiyur Mahimai Matha. People of all religions throng to pray to her and continue to receive many benefits. The present parish priest is Fr. Roy Arokiadoss who was appointed in June, 2010. Mugaiyur is also a center of learning. It has a century old elementary school that was started in 1908. There is also St.Xavier's Higher Secondary school for boys at Inigo Nagar. St. Joseph's girls primary school, St. Joseph's Girls Higher Secondary School and St.Joseph's Matriculation school are run by the sisters of St. Louis de Gonzague.

In Tamil Nadu history the erstwhile Mugaiyur assembly constituency, it is said, is the constituency from which Mr. Govindasamy ( a former Minister in the DMK regime) was elected to the state assembly as the first member who contested with the 'rising sun' (udhaya suriyan)symbol. Only recently the Mugaiyur assembly constituency had been clubbed into the Tirukoilur constituency.

== Education Institutions ==
Mugaiyur is also a center of learning.

- It has a century old elementary school that was started in 1908.
- St. Xavier's Higher Secondary school for boys at Inigo Nagar.
- St. Joseph's girls primary school,
- St. Joseph's Girls Higher Secondary School and
- St.Joseph's Matriculation school are run by the sisters of St. Louis de Gonzague.
- St.Xavier ITI, Mugaiyur

== Mugaiyur - Residents swell the ranks of Army ==
For a population of 5,000, there are over 600 soldiers. For hearing exploits of soldiers on the war front, one must go to Mugaiyur village. The otherwise non-descript place tucked away in a corner of the Thirukkoilur block in Villupuram district is full of war veterans and serving defence personnel.

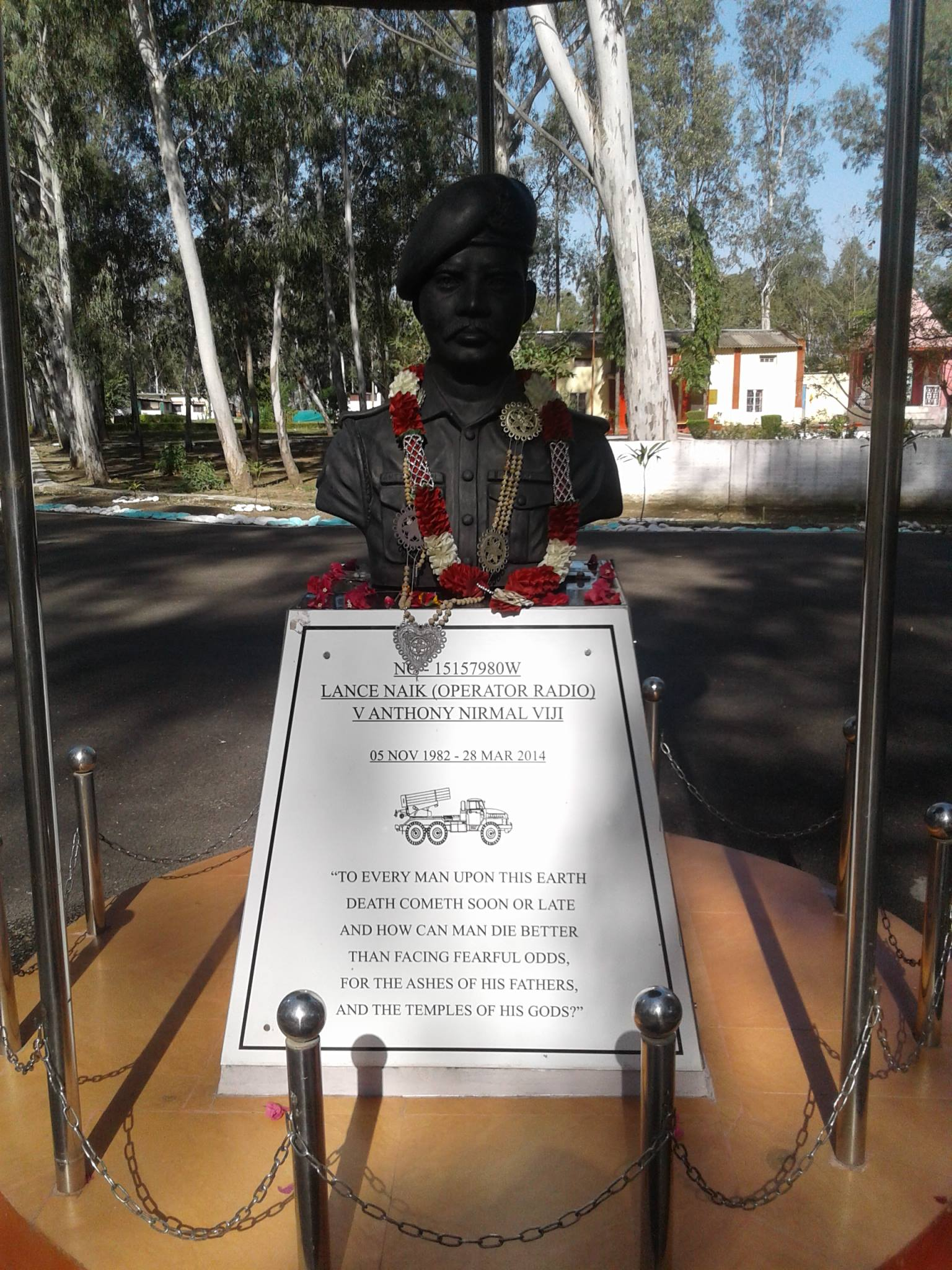
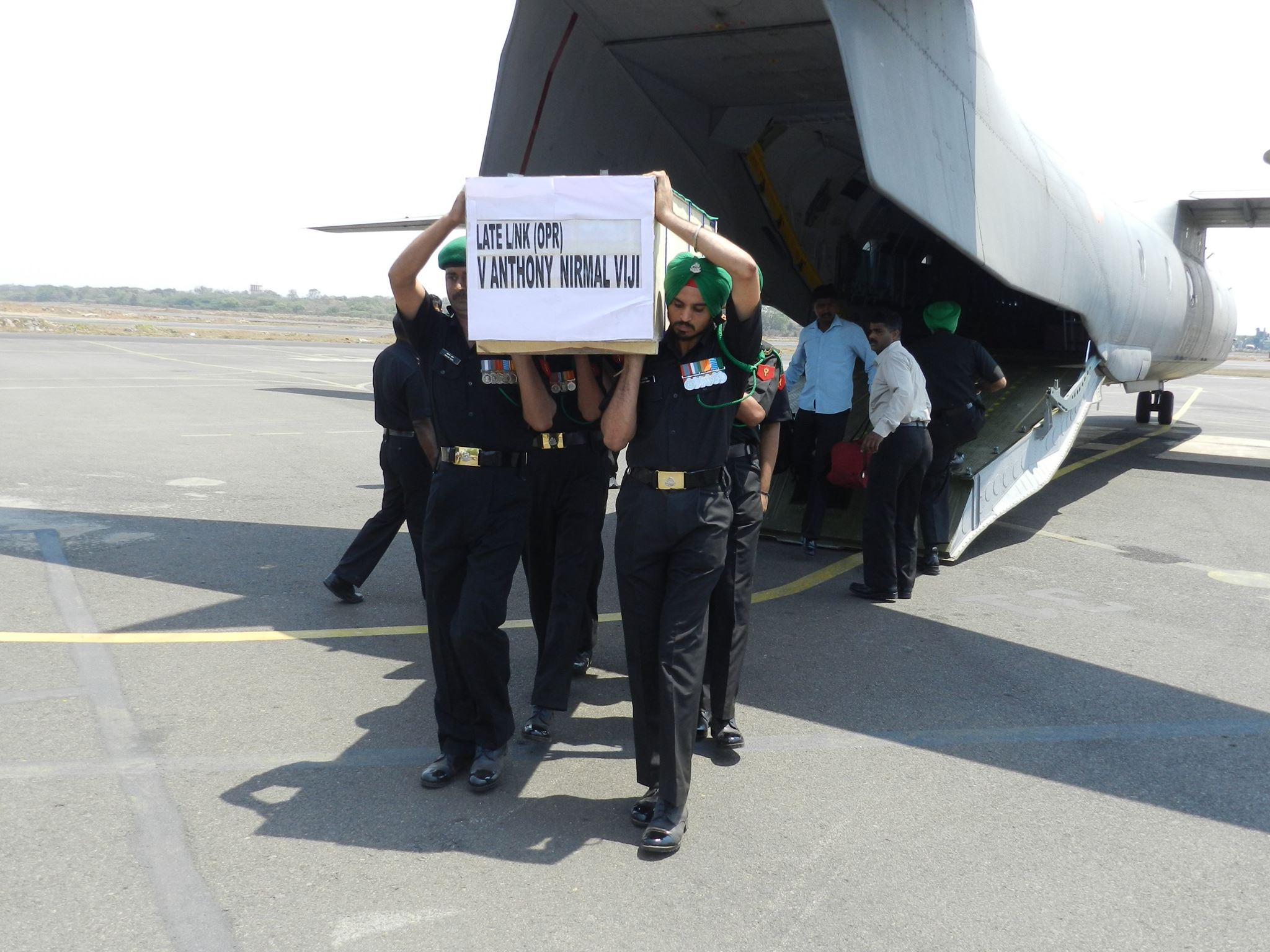

https://www.thehindu.com/news/national/tamil-nadu/mugaiyur-residents-swell-the-ranks-of-army/article5853548.ece

The funeral of Lance Naik V. Anthony Nirmal Viji (31), who was killed in a fidayeen attack in Jammu on Friday, took place at his native place at Mugaiyur in Thirukkoilur block with full military honours on Saturday.

== Hospitals, Clinic & Medicals ==
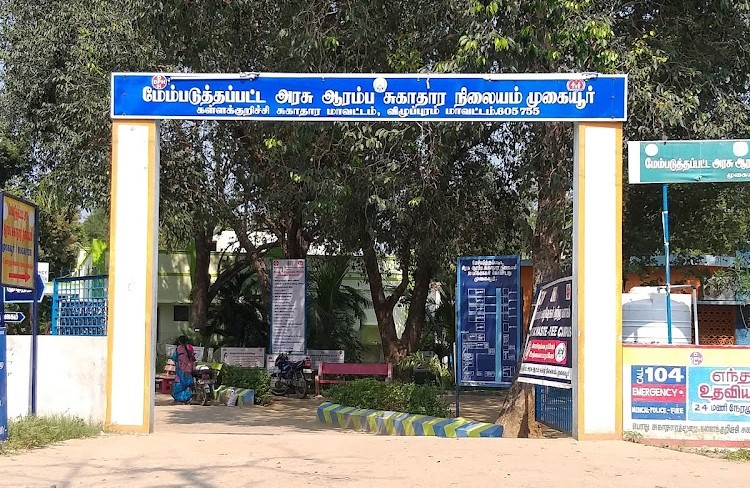

- Govt.Primary Health Center, Mugaiyur
- Dr. Muthuraj Clinic & Medicals, Bus Stop, Mugaiyur
- Devi Clinic & JJ Medicals, Irudhayapuram Road Mugaiyur
- Venkateshwara Medicals, Near IOB, Mugaiyur
- MJ Clinic & MEGA Medicals, Railway Gate, Mugaiyur

== Mugaiyur Assembly constituency ==
Mugaiyur is a state assembly constituency in Viluppuram district in Tamil Nadu. After the delimitation of constituencies in 2008, it was reorganised into Tirukkoyilur Assembly constituency.
