= Irumbai =

- Village
- Irumbai, Villupuram district, Tamil Nadu
- Coordinates: 12°0′24.52″N 79°47′14.26″E
- Country: India
- State: Tamil Nadu
- District: Villupuram

Languages
  - Official: Tamil
- Time zone: UTC+5:30 (IST)

Irumbai temple

Irumbai is a village situated next to Auroville in the Indian state of Tamil Nadu, and at about 10 km from Pondicherry.

== Temple ==
An ancient temple dedicated to Lord Shiva is there hosting Magakaleswarar, Maga Kalanathar and goddesses Mathura Sundara Nayagi and Kuil Mozhiyammai. This temple has ancient records written by Thirugnanasambantha Swamigal and are hosted Pujas . The Mahakaleshwar cult was only conducted in three locations in India. Irumbai Mahakaleshwar Temple served as a connecting point to the other two of the three.

This Shivasthalam temple is 9 km from Pondicherry on Pondicherry—Tindivanam bus route. Another Paadal Petra Sthalam Tiruarisili is 5 km northwest of this Sthalam.

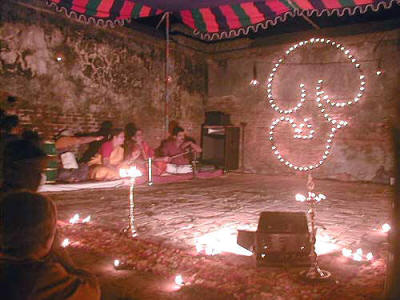
Irumbai festival
