= Parrikal =

- village
- Country: India
- State: Tamil Nadu

Languages
  - Official: Tamil
- Time zone: UTC+5:30 (IST)

Parrikal is a small village about 28 kilometers from Villupuram, Tamil Nadu. Parrikal is famous for its ancient temple which houses Shri Lakshmi Narasimha (the fourth Avatar of Vishnu). Many Madhva Brahmin families of the Shri Vyasaraja Mutt (Sosale) order owe allegiance to Parrikal Lakshmi Narasimha as their Kula Devata (God being worshiped ancestrally). Lore has it that the idols here are very ancient prathisthapane (installation) dating to 1500 BC.

Entrance of the Sanctum of Shri Lakshmi Narasihma Devaru at Parrikal

== History ==
Very little is known about the history of this holy place. It is believed that idol of Shri Lakshmi Narasihma the fourth Avatar of Vishnu which has been consecrated was made by lord Brahma himself. As per the Purohit (Brahmins who perform the daily rituals at the temple), the Chola kings had great reverence towards this temple.

Recently, the temple is under the temple endowments department of Tamil Nadu. There is a meal scheme at the temple, where devotees are provided with free lunch.

Inside the temple

== Transport ==
Parrikal is about 28 kilometers from Villupuram, which is about 150 km from Chennai.
