= Tindivanam taluk =

Administrative division of Tamil Nadu, India

Tindivanam taluk is a taluk of Viluppuram district of the Indian state of Tamil Nadu. The headquarters of the taluk is the town of Tindivanam.

== Demographics ==
In 2011, the taluk of Tindivanam had a population of 446,024 with 223,391 males and 222,633 females. There were 997 women for every 1,000 men. The taluk had a literacy rate of 67.66%. Child population in the age group below 6 years were 23,196 males and 22,445 females.
