= Kottakuppam =

- Town
- Location in Tamil Nadu, India
- Coordinates: 11°59′29″N 79°50′29″E
- Country: India
- State: Tamil Nadu
- District: Viluppuram

Population (2021)
  - Total: 47,661

Languages
  - Official: Tamil
- Time zone: UTC+5:30 (IST)
- PIN: 605 104
- Telephone code: 0413
- Vehicle registration: TN 16
- Website: kottakuppam.in

Kottakuppam is a developing town in Viluppuram district in the state of Tamil Nadu, India, approximately 5km from the nearby city of Pondicherry.
