= Mailam Engineering College =

Engineering college in Tamil Nadu, India

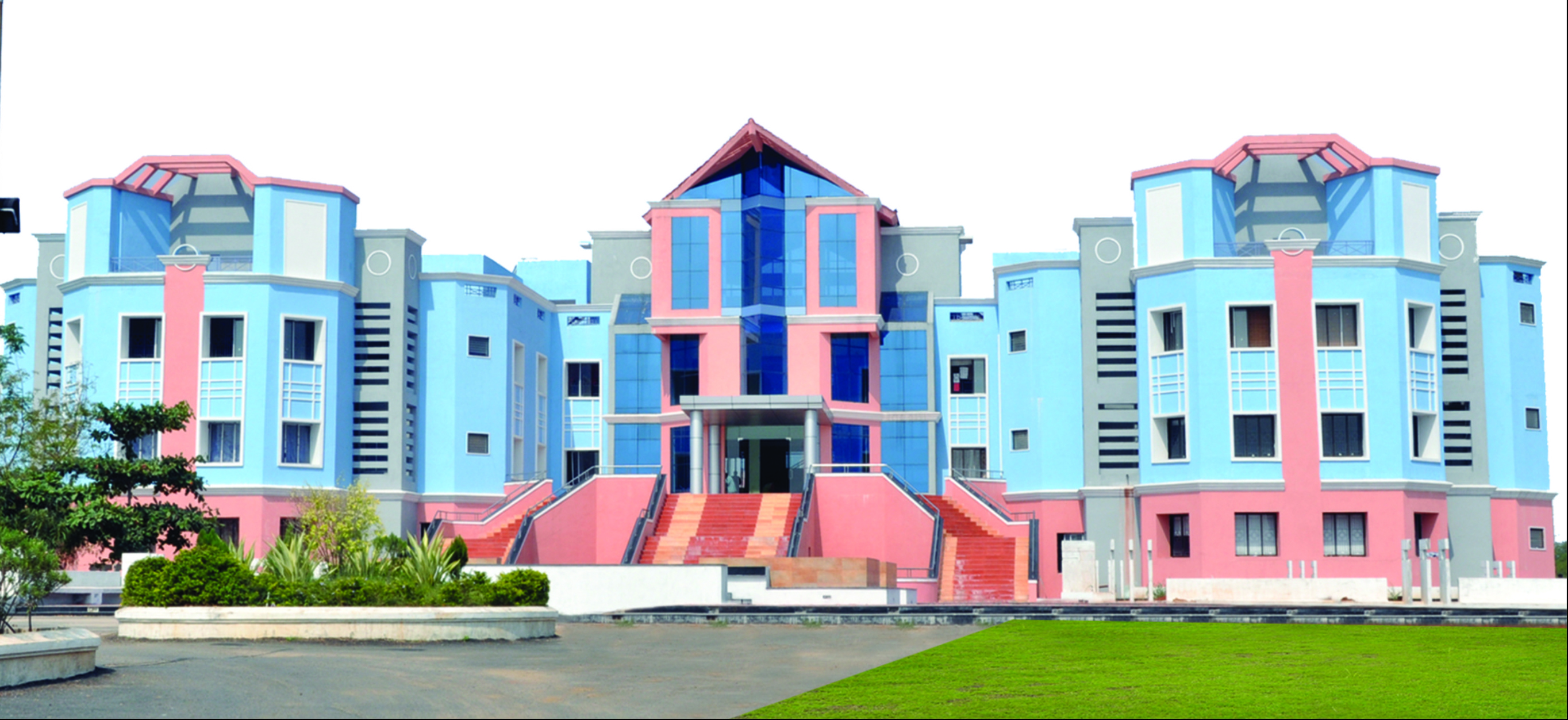
- Mailam Engineering College Admin Block
- Motto: "A Place to Foster Innovative Technologists"
- Type: Self-financing
- Established: 1998
- Affiliations: Anna University, Chennai
- Chairman: Shri M. Dhanasekaran
- Administrative staff: 400
- Students: 4000
- Undergraduates: 3500
- Postgraduates: 500
- Location: Mailam, Tamil Nadu, 604304, India; 12.116747°N 79.615261°E
- Campus: Mailam, Tindivanam Taluk, Villupuram District
- Accreditation: AICTE, NBA, TCS
- Colors: White and green
- Nickname: MEC
- Website: https://www.mailamengg.com/

Mailam Engineering College is a private engineering college, founded in 1998, in the Villupuram district of Tamil Nadu, India.

The college is approved by the All India Council for Technical Education, New Delhi and affiliated with Anna University, Chennai. The college is built in a campus of 42 acres, situated adjacent to the Sri Subramaniam Swamy Koil, Mailam, and Sri Vakkarakali Amman Koil, Thiruvakkarai. The college has an air-conditioned auditorium that can accommodate 750 students.

In January 2025, the college stood first among the 315 colleges in the Naan Madhalvan scheme by providing 660 placements. In 2016, the college students of the department of electronics and communication engineering developed an anti piracy equipment to prevent motion picture on screen from exposure to all kinds of lenses. The college students also developed a remote powered ploughing machine.

== Courses ==
The college offers eight undergraduate courses and six postgraduate courses including M.B.A. and M.C.A.

== Undergraduate courses ==
The college offers four-year undergraduate courses in Computer Science and Engineering (from 1998), Civil Engineering (2009), Electrical and Electronics Engineering (1998), Electronics and Communications Engineering (2001), Mechanical Engineering (1998), and B.Tech courses in Information Technology (2001) and Artificial Intelligence and Data Science (2021).

== Post Graduate programmes ==
The college also offers two year post-graduate programmes in Master of Computer Application (started in 2000) Engineering Design (2004), Computer Science and Engineering (2005), Power Electronics and Drives (2005), Master of Business Administration (2006) and Communication Systems (2009).
