= Anichangkuppam =

Anichangkuppam is an Indian village situated in East coast Road from Pondicherry to Chennai, also called as Nambikkai nallure.

Anichangkuppam comes under kizhputhupet panchayat, Viluppuram district which is 15 kilometres (9.3 mi) away from Pondicherry to the north. There are around 350 families living in this village.
