= Vanur taluk =

Coordinates: 12°01′32″N 79°43′25″E

Vanur taluk is a taluk of Viluppuram district of the Indian state of Tamil Nadu. The headquarters of the taluk is the town of Vanur.

== Demographics ==
According to the 2011 census, the taluk of Vanur had a population of 196,282 with 98,852 males and 97,430 females. There were 986 women for every 1,000 men. The taluk had a literacy rate of 68.73%. Child population in the age group below 6 was 11,028 males and 10,647 females.

== See also ==
- Pombur
