= Pennagar, Gingee =

Pennagar
- Village Panchayat
- Nickname: Pennagar (Gingee)
- Location in Tamil Nadu, India Pennagar (India)
- Coordinates: 12.342895°N 79.439937°E
- Country: India
- State: Tamil Nadu
- District: Villupuram
- Elevation: 114 m (374 ft)

Population (2001)
  - Total: 2,071

Languages
  - Official: Tamil
- Time zone: UTC+5:30 (IST)
- PIN: 604210

Penagar is an Indian Panchayat village located in Gingee taluk of Viluppuram district in the state of Tamil Nadu, India. According to the 2001 census, the village had a population of 2071, with a literacy rate of 59%.
