= Viluppuram taluk =

Coordinates: 11.941°N 79.493°E

Viluppuram Taluk is a taluk of Viluppuram district of the Indian state of Tamil Nadu. The headquarters of the taluk is the town of Viluppuram.

== Demographics ==
According to the 2011 census, the taluk of Viluppuram had a population of 715,411 with 358,721 males and 356,690 females. There were 994 women for every 1,000 men. The taluk had a literacy rate of 69.6%. Child population in the age group below 6, was 38,979 Males and 37,052 Females.
