= Kuilappalayam =

Human settlement in India

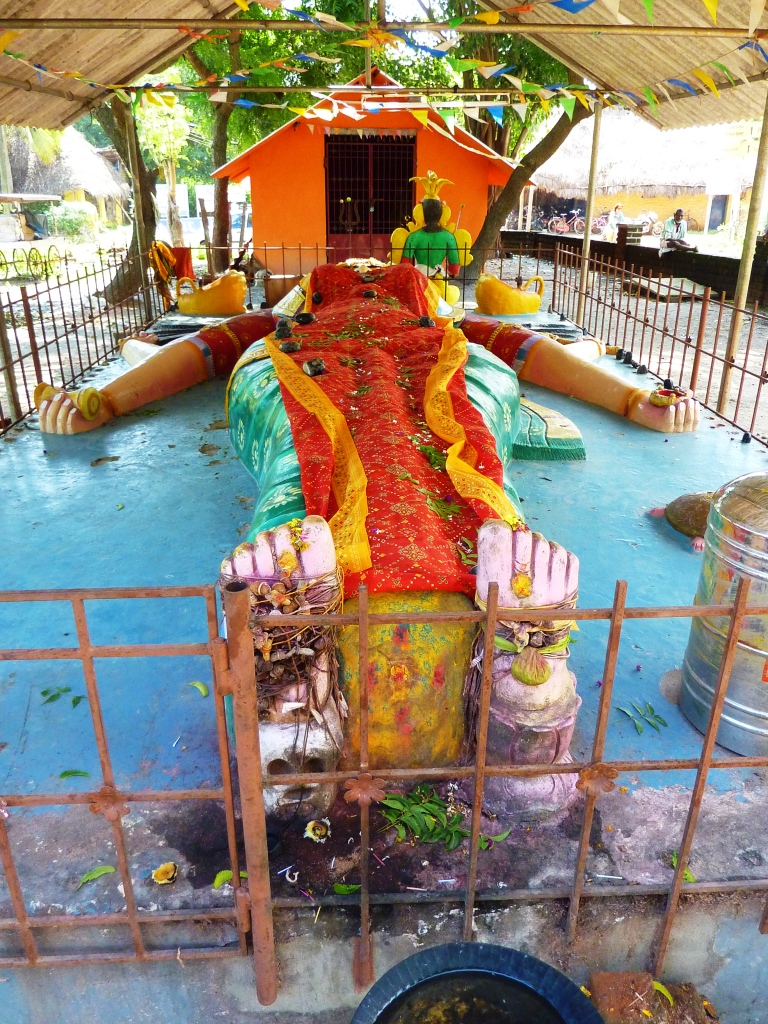
Draupati Amman temple in Kuiliappalayam, a mythological character in the Mahabharata.

Kuilappalayam is a village in Tamil Nadu state of India near Auroville township.

== Kanum Pongal ==
During the three days of the Kanum Pongal festival, the Ankalaman Temple is surrounded by many kind of shops and activities like dance and music.

According to The Hindu, the village has more than 50 bullock carts. "The race starts after performing "puja" to the local deity, Mariamman. Then the deity is brought in procession near the Ellaipidari Temple, where cattle decked up with festoons, balloons and pictures of film stars are lined up for the race. They would run at the burst of firecrackers. The owners too dress up well for the occasion. While some of the men did succeed in accompanying the cattle till the finishing point, others leave the race half way."
