= Pennagar, Vellore =

Pennagar
- village
- Location in Tamil Nadu, India Pennagar (India)
- Coordinates: 12.717560°N 79.402223°E
- Country: India
- State: Tamil Nadu
- District: Ranipet

Languages
  - Official: Tamil
- Time zone: UTC+5:30 (IST)
- PIN: 632518
- Vehicle registration: TN-73 (Ranipet)
- Nearest City: Ranipet
- Literacy: 80%
- Lok Sabha constituency: Arakkonam
- Assembly constituency: Arcot
- Climate: hot (Köppen)

Pennagar is a village in Ranipet district, Tamil Nadu. It is well known for holding quite good ratio of teachers in population. Though the transport facilities are limited to these kind of villages, it is a pride for having a higher secondary school with Her. Arni, Cheyyar and Arcot are the other major towns that are nearby. Farming is the main occupation here, supported by few rice-mills and shops here.

== Demographics ==
According to directorate of Census Operations - Tamil Nadu's 2001 reading, population here is 3019 with approximately 80% literacy ratio.

== Nearby Towns ==
Arcot is about 28 km, Arni is about 19 km, Cheyyar is about 21 km, Kanchipuram is about 50 km and Vellore is about 50 km from the village. Kalavai and Mambakkam are near by 6 km and 5 km simultaneously.

== Schools ==
- Pennagar Government higher secondary school
- Pennagar Government elementary school
