= Marakkanam block =

The Marakkanam block is a revenue block in the Viluppuram district of Tamil Nadu, India. It has a total of 56 panchayat villages.
