= Gingee taluk =

District headquarters in Tamil Nadu, India

Coordinates: 12.15°N 79.30°E

Gingee taluk is a taluk of Viluppuram district of the Indian state of Tamil Nadu. The headquarters of the taluk is the town of Gingee.

== Demographics ==
According to the 2011 census, the taluk of Gingee had a population of 422,880 with 213,162 males and 209,718 females. There were 984 women for every 1,000 men. The taluk had a literacy rate of 63.41%. Child population in the age group below 6 was 20,329 Males and 18,804 Females.
