= Mailam =

Town panchayat in Tamil Nadu, India

Coordinates: 12.127°N 79.619°E

Mailam Mailam
- panchayat town
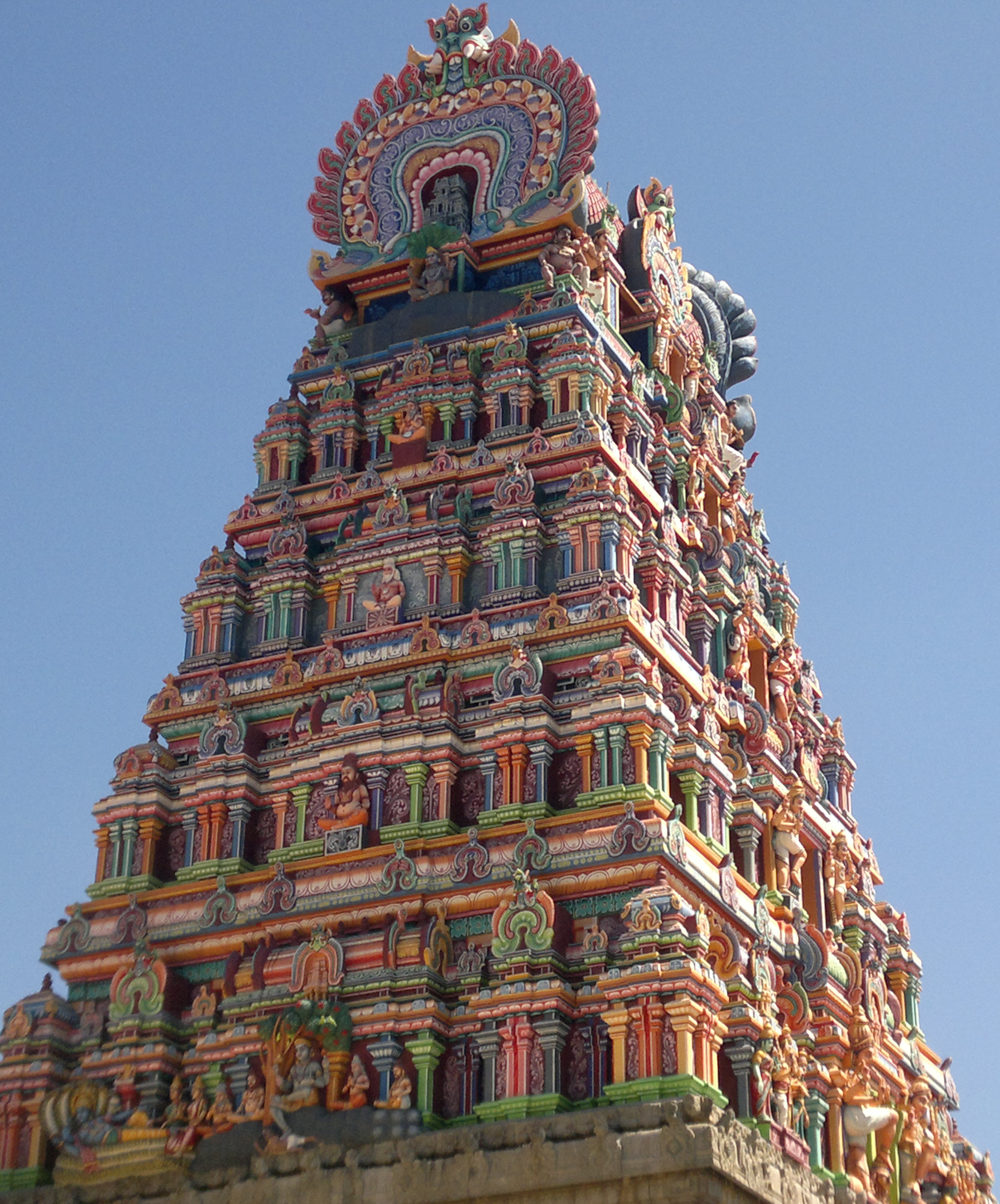
- Tower of Mayilam Murugan Temple
- Interactive map of Mailam
- Country: India
- State: Tamil Nadu
- District: Villupuram
- Taluk: Tindivanam

Government
  - Type: Town Panchayat
  - Body: Local government in Tamil Nadu

Population (2011)
  - Total: 7,538

Languages
  - Official: Tamil
- Time zone: UTC+5:30 (IST)
- Area code: 04326(XXXXXX)

Mayilam is a panchayat town in Tindivanam taluk, Viluppuram district in the Indian state of Tamil Nadu.

== Education ==
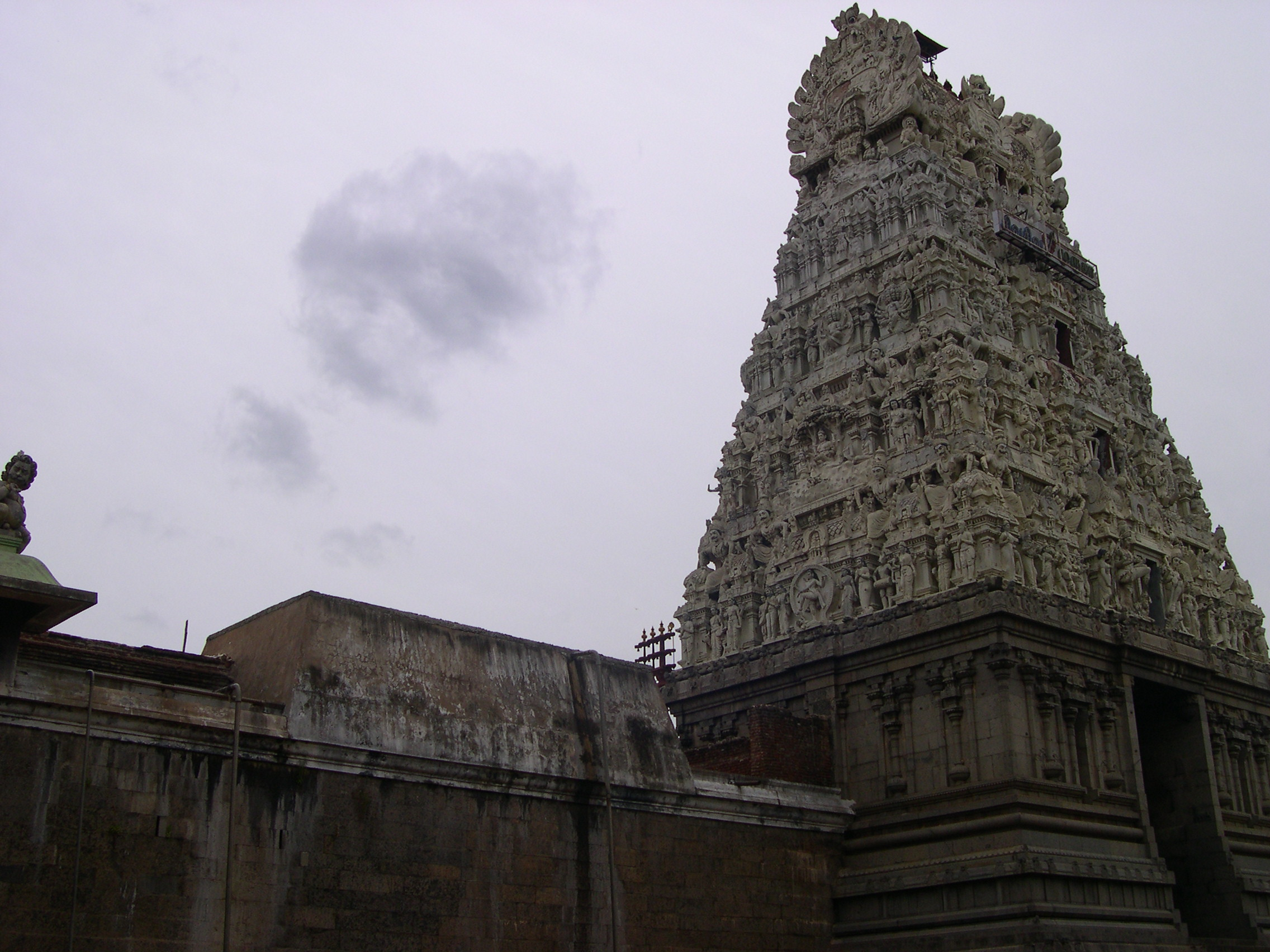
Mayilam Murugan Temple

Schools in Mayilam:

- Sivaprakasar school
- Aided HSS, Mayilam
- Nehru Mat. Hs Mayilam
- PUMS Mayilam
- PUPS mayilam
- Sri Ramakrishna Primary Mayilam (SRV)
- B.W.D.A Nursery and Primary school
- S.S. High School

Other colleges: Srimath Sivanana Balaya Swamigal Tamil Arts & Science college Mailam Engineering college,
