= Tindivanam =

- Municipality
- Tindivanam, Tamil Nadu
- Coordinates: 12.226700°N 79.650400°E
- Country: India
- State: Tamil Nadu
- District: Viluppuram

Government
  - Type: Selection Grade Municipality
  - Body: Tindivanam Municipality

Area
  - Municipality: 22.33 km^{2} (8.62 sq mi)
  - Rank: 2nd
- Elevation: 70 m (230 ft)

Population (2021)
  - Municipality: 120,405
  - Density: 5,392/km^{2} (13,970/sq mi)
  - Metro: 116,002

Languages
  - Official: Tamil
- Time zone: UTC+5:30 (IST)
- PIN: 604001, 604002
- Telephone code: 91-4147
- Vehicle registration: TN-16
- Website: http://municipality.tn.gov.in/tindivanam/#

Tindivanam is a municipality in Viluppuram district in the Indian state of Tamil Nadu. It is the second largest town in Villupuram District after the headquarters town Villupuram.

== Demographics ==
Religious census
Religion	Percent(%)
Hindu	82.16%
Muslim	11.95%
Christian	4.39%
Jain	1.36%
Sikh	0.04%
Buddhist	0.02%
Other	0.08%

According to 2011 census, Tindivanam had a population of 72,796 with a sex-ratio of 1,003 females for every 1,000 males, much above the national average of 929. A total of 7,664 were under the age of six, constituting 3,922 males and 3,742 females. Scheduled Castes and Scheduled Tribes accounted for 16.59% and 0.49% of the population respectively. The average literacy of the town was 78.19%, compared to the national average of 72.99%. The town had a total of 17,088 households. There were a total of 24,415 workers, comprising 595 cultivators, 672 main agricultural labourers, 465 in house hold industries, 19,541 other workers, 3,142 marginal workers, 51 marginal cultivators, 431 marginal agricultural labourers, 207 marginal workers in household industries and 2,453 other marginal workers. As per the religious census of 2011, Tindivanam had 82.16% Hindus, 11.95% Muslims, 4.39% Christians, 0.04% Sikhs, 0.02% Buddhists, 1.36% Jains, 0.08% following other religions and 0.0% following no religion or did not indicate any religious preference.

== Climate ==
Tindivanam's climate is classified as tropical. In winter, there is much less rainfall in Tindivanam than in summer. The Köppen-Geiger climate classification is Aw. The average annual temperature is 28.4 °C in Tindivanam. In a year, the average rainfall is 1,045 mm (41.1 in). Precipitation is the lowest in March, with an average of 5 mm (0.20 in). With an average of 220 mm (8.7 in), the most precipitation falls in October. At an average temperature of 32.3 °C, May is the hottest month of the year. January has the lowest average temperature of the year. It is 24.5 °C. Between the driest and wettest months, the difference in precipitation is 215 mm (8.5 in). During the year, the average temperatures vary by 7.8 °C.

Climate data for Tindivanam
Month	Jan	Feb	Mar	Apr	May	Jun	Jul	Aug	Sep	Oct	Nov	Dec	Year
Mean daily maximum °C (°F)	28.8 (83.8)	30.5 (86.9)	32.7 (90.9)	34.7 (94.5)	37.4 (99.3)	37.2 (99.0)	35.4 (95.7)	34.8 (94.6)	34.2 (93.6)	32 (90)	29.4 (84.9)	28.3 (82.9)	32.9 (91.3)
Mean daily minimum °C (°F)	20.2 (68.4)	20.5 (68.9)	22.5 (72.5)	25.6 (78.1)	27.2 (81.0)	27 (81)	26 (79)	25.4 (77.7)	25 (77)	24 (75)	22.3 (72.1)	20.8 (69.4)	23.9 (75.0)
Average rainfall mm (inches)	19 (0.7)	10 (0.4)	5 (0.2)	18 (0.7)	42 (1.7)	43 (1.7)	87 (3.4)	160 (6.3)	131 (5.2)	220 (8.7)	216 (8.5)	94 (3.7)	1,045 (41.2)
Source: https://en.climate-data.org/asia/india/tamil-nadu/tindivanam-968051/#climate-table

== Politics ==
- Tindivanam assembly constituency is part of Villupuram (Lok Sabha constituency) (up to 2009 Tindivanam was a Lok Sabha constituency).
- Tindivanam legislative assembly:
1. Member of legislative assembly : Seethapathy P
- Tindivanam Municipal Council:
1. Chairman: nil
2. Vice chairman
3. Commissioner: S.Annadurai, B.A.

== Notable people ==
- O. P. Ramaswamy Reddiyar
- S. Ramadoss
- Anbumani Ramadoss
- Tindivanam K. Ramamurthy
- C. V. Shanmugam

== Oil Seed Research Station ==
Oilseeds Research Station is located in a distance of 3 km from Tindivanam town. Started as Agricultural Research Station in 1935, later inducted with Tamilnadu Agricultural University in the year 1981. Oilseeds Research Station has been established by Govt of Tamilnadu to evolve groundnut, sesame and castor varieties with desirable attributes viz., short duration, high yield, high oil content, drought tolerance, fresh seed dormancy, resistance to major insect pests and diseases etc. Groundnut (Has separate Kolmudal Nilayalam (Tamil)) & Oil seeds research station – affiliated to the Tamil Nadu Agricultural University

== Temples ==
1. Mailam or Mayilam is located 15 kilometres from Tindivanam.
2. Chandramouleeswar temple, Thiruvakkarai
3. Shri Lakshmi Narasimmar temple, Tindivanam
4. Shri Nerkuthi Vinayagar temple, Theevanur
5. Shri Bheemeshwarar temple, Omandur
6. Shri Agastheeshwarar temple, Kiliyanur

== National Fossil Wood Park ==
National Fossil Wood Park, Tiruvakkarai is a notified National Geo-heritage Monument located in the Villupuram District in the Indian state of Tamil Nadu and is maintained by the Geological Survey of India. The park was established in 1940 and is located 1 km east of Thiruvakkarai village on the road between Tindivanam and Pondicherry. The park contains petrified wood fossils approximately 20 million years old, scattered throughout the park, which covers about 247 acres (100 ha). The park consists of nine enclaves, but only a small portion of the 247 acres (approx 1 square km) is open to the public. Officials of the GSI believe the fossils were formed during massive flooding that occurred millions of years ago. The park hosts about 200 fossilized trees.
