= Viluppuram =

City in Viluppuram district, India

Villupuram
- City
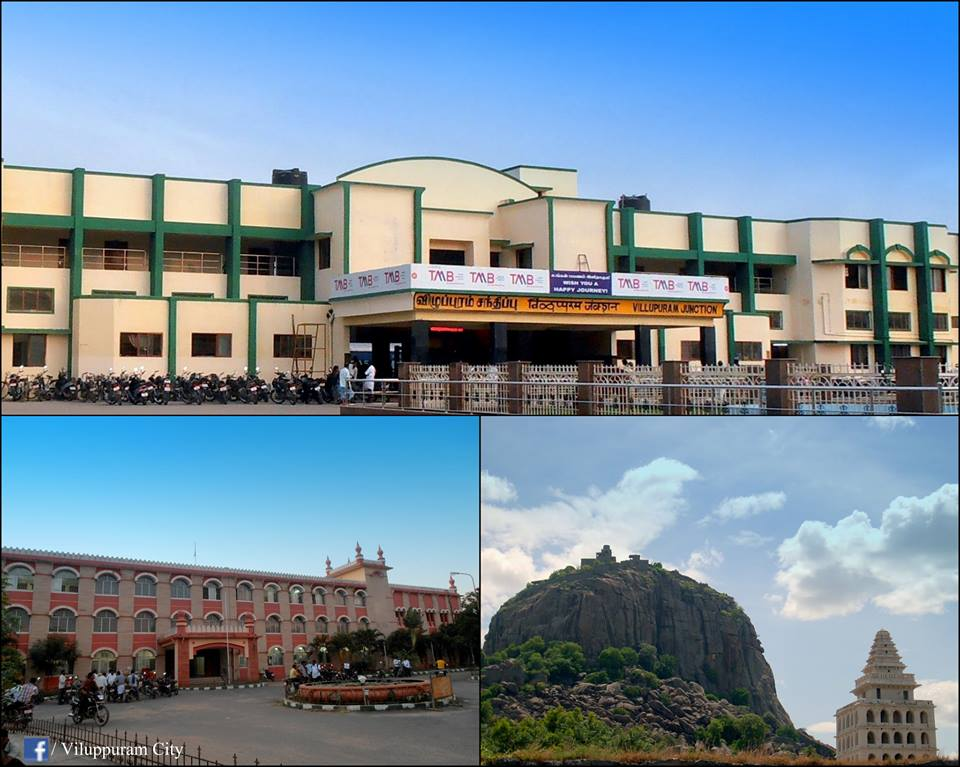
- Viluppuram Junction, District Court, Gingee Fort

- Villupuram, Tamil Nadu
- Coordinates: 11.940100°N 79.486100°E
- Country: India
- State: Tamil Nadu
- Region: Tondai Nadu
- District: Viluppuram
- Established: 1919

Government
  - Type: Viluppuram Municipality (Special Grade)
  - Body: Viluppuram Municipality
  - Chairman: Vacant

Area
  - Total: 37.13 km^{2} (14.34 sq mi)
  - Rank: 13
- Elevation: 71 m (233 ft)

Population (2021)
  - Total: 191,131
  - Density: 5,148/km^{2} (13,330/sq mi)

Languages
  - Official: Tamil
- Time zone: UTC+5:30 (IST)
- PIN: 605601, 605602, 605401, 605103, k605301
- Telephone code: +91–04146(STD Code)
- Vehicle registration: TN–32, TN-16
- Distance from Chennai: 160 kilometres (99 mi)
- Sex ratio: 998 ♂/♀
- Climate: Aw(Köppen)
- Literacy: 90.16%
- Website: Viluppuram Municipality

Viluppuram, Villupuram, or Vizhuppuram (Tamil: [ʋiɻɯppɯɾam]) is a city and the administrative headquarters of Viluppuram district of Tamil Nadu.

Located 61 kilometres (38 mi) south west of a Tiruvannamalai and 35 kilometres (22 mi) north west of Cuddalore null The town serves as a major and largest railway junction, and National Highway 45 passes through it. Agriculture is a main source of income. As Government of India 2021 census data indicated, Viluppuram had a population of 191,131. and the town's literacy rate has been recorded as 90.16% by Census 2011.

In 1919, Villupuram city was officially constituted as a Municipality which today comprises 42 wards, making it one of the largest cities in Tamilnadu.

== History ==
In 1677, [Shri Chhatrapati Shivaji Maharah] took Gingee area with the assistance of Golkonda forces. Later in 18th century, both the English and French acquired settlements in South Arcot. During the Anglo-French rivalry, the entire district was turned into a war land. After some time, the entire area came under the control of East India Company. It remained under British authority till 1947 when India became independent.

After independence, the district as we know it today, was part of the larger South Arcot District headquartered at Cuddalore. On 30 September 1993, Villupuram became the headquarters of the newly created Vizhuppuram District as a result of the division of the South Arcot District.

== Geography ==
Vizhuppuram is located in 11° 56' N 79° 29' E. which is in the far southeast part of India, situated 145 kilometres (90 mi) south of Chennai, 160 kilometres (99 mi) north of Trichy, 177 kilometres (110 mi) east of Salem, 35 kilometres (22 mi) North west of Cuddalore, 35 kilometres (22 mi) west of Pondicherry shares the seashore of the Bay of Bengal.

The area contains metamorphic rocks formed by pressure and heat belonging to the granite-like gneiss family. There are also three major groups of sedimentary rocks, layers of particles that settled in different geological periods. Kalrayan Hills forest park is located 116 kilometres (72 mi) to the west and Gingee Hills forest park 50 kilometres (31 mi) to the north. The Thatagiri Murugan Temple is about 191 kilometres (119 mi) to the southeast in Senthamangalam with the Lord Siva temple in Koppampatti 153 kilometres (95 mi) southwest of the town.

=== Climate ===
Since the town is landlocked, the weather in Viluppuram is generally humid and hot. It relies on the monsoon for rain from July to December. Summers are very hot, and temperatures can get up to 40 °C (104 °F). Winters are moderate with temperatures ranging between 30 and 35 °C (86 and 95 °F) Viluppuram has a tropical climate. In winter, there is much less rainfall in Viluppuram than in summer. This climate is considered to be Aw/As according to the Köppen-Geiger climate classification.

The average annual temperature is 28.4 °C (83.1 °F) in Viluppuram with average annual rainfall of 1,046 millimetres (41.2 in). The driest month is March, with 6 millimetres (0.24 in) of rainfall. With an average of 222 millimetres (8.7 in) per annum, the most precipitation falls in October. The warmest month of the year is May, with an average temperature of 32.0 °C (89.6 °F). January has the lowest average temperature of the year at 24.6 °C (76.3 °F).

Climate data for Viluppuram
Month	Jan	Feb	Mar	Apr	May	Jun	Jul	Aug	Sep	Oct	Nov	Dec	Year
Mean daily maximum °C (°F)	28.8 (83.8)	30.6 (87.1)	32.9 (91.2)	34.7 (94.5)	37.1 (98.8)	37.1 (98.8)	34.5 (94.1)	34.8 (94.6)	34.2 (93.6)	32.0 (89.6)	29.5 (85.1)	28.2 (82.8)	32.9 (91.2)
Mean daily minimum °C (°F)	20.4 (68.7)	20.8 (69.4)	22.7 (72.9)	25.6 (78.1)	27.0 (80.6)	26.9 (80.4)	25.9 (78.6)	25.3 (77.5)	24.9 (76.8)	22.1 (71.8)	22.5 (72.5)	21.2 (70.2)	23.8 (74.8)
Average rainfall mm (inches)	20 (0.8)	7 (0.3)	6 (0.2)	29 (1.1)	45 (1.8)	45 (1.8)	89 (3.5)	150 (5.9)	130 (5.1)	220 (8.7)	216 (8.5)	110 (4.3)	1,067 (42)
Source: en.climate-data.org,

The difference in precipitation between the driest month and the wettest month is 216 millimetres (8.5 in). During the year, the average temperatures vary by 7.4 °C (45.3 °F).

== Demographics ==
Historical population
Year	Pop.	±%
1961	43,496	—
1971	60,242	+38.5%
1981	77,091	+28.0%
1991	88,788	+15.2%
2001	95,455	+7.5%
2011	96,253	+0.8%
Sources: 1961 – 2001; 2011; 2014

As of the 2011 census, Viluppuram municipality was divided into 44 wards for which elections are held every five years and had a population of 96,253 of which 47,670 were male and 48,583 female.

Religious census
Religion	Percent(%)
Hindu	78.35%
Muslim	14.88%
Christian	6.15%
Jain	0.38%
Sikh	0.02%
Buddhist	0.01%
Other	0.01%
No religion	0.20%

== Administration ==
Elected members
Member of Legislative Assembly	R. Lakshmanan
Member of Parliament	D. Ravi kumar

Politically, Viluppuram is part of the Vizhuppuram Lok Sabha constituency and the Villupuram State Assembly constituency. The municipality was established in 1919 and was upgraded to a second-grade municipality in 1953, the first-grade municipality in 1973, and a selection grade municipality in 1988, and Special grade Municipality in 2023. The town is divided into 42 wards. The city Papulation is 1,91,131. The municipal council is composed of 42 ward councilors and is headed by a chairperson elected by voters of the town. Councilors-elect a vice-chairperson among themselves while the executive wing is headed by a commissioner, who is assisted by a team of officials including the health officer, municipal engineer, town planning officer, manager, revenue officer and other staff.

== Transport ==
=== Road ===
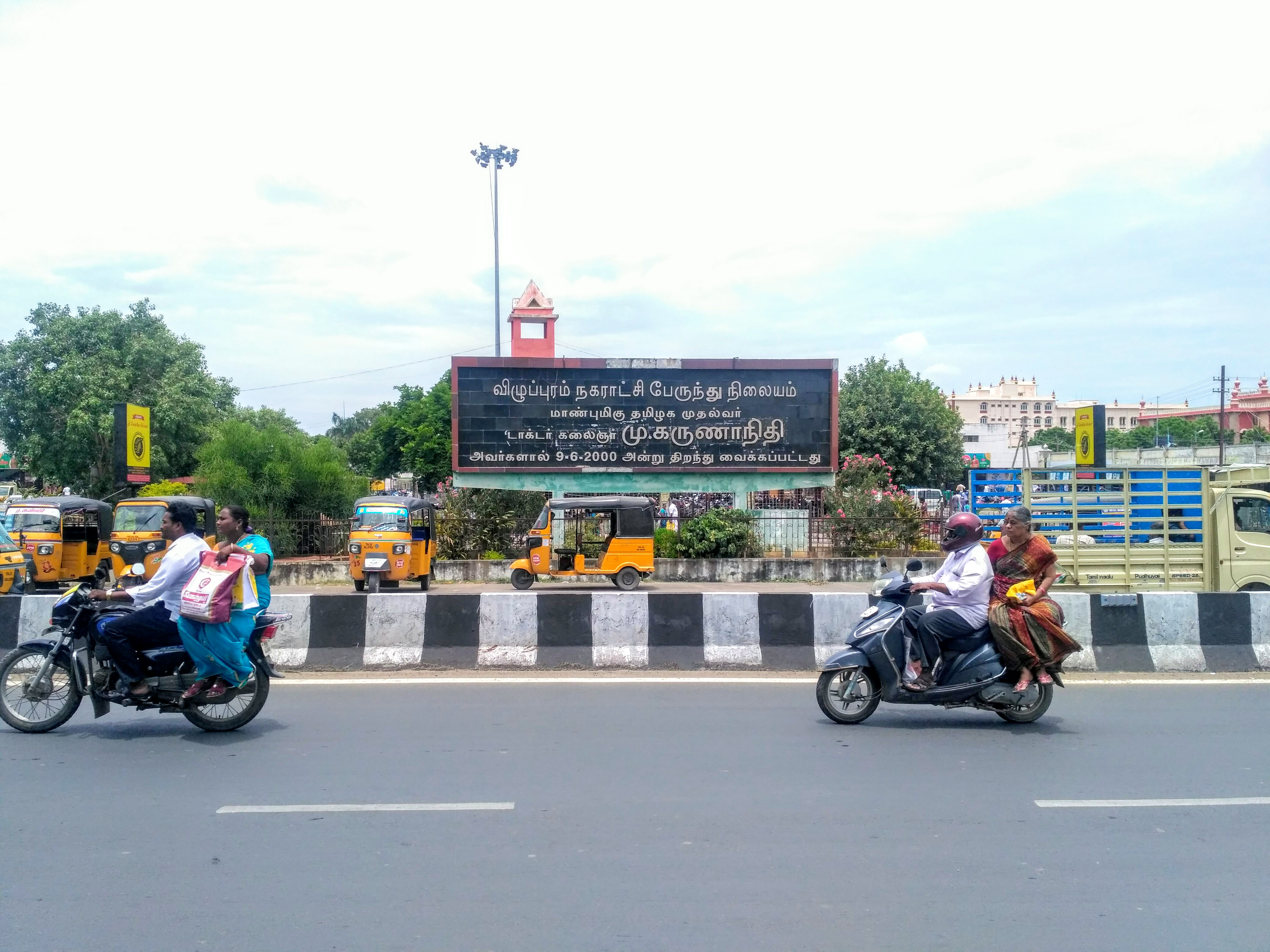
Viluppuram Bus Stand

Viluppuram is connected by roads to major cities and to the rest of the state. The major national highways of the town are:

- NH 234 which connects Vilupuram - Mangalore , via Bangalore - Vellore - Tiruvannamalai
- NH 45 which connects Chennai - Theni , via Trichy
- NH NH 38, which Connects Villupuram - Nagapattinam via Pondicherry - Cuddalore - Nagapattinam
- NH 36, which connects Vikravandi (Villupuram) and Manamadurai via Panruti – Neyveli – Kumbakonam - Thanjavur - Pudukottai bypasses Villupuram City at 3 km in Koliyanur.
- SH 07 connects Villupuram - Tirukoilur
- SH 04 Villupuram - Tirupati Via Gingee, Chetpet, Arani, Velore
- SH 05 Villupuram - Salem Via Thiruveninellur, Kallakurchi

=== Rail ===
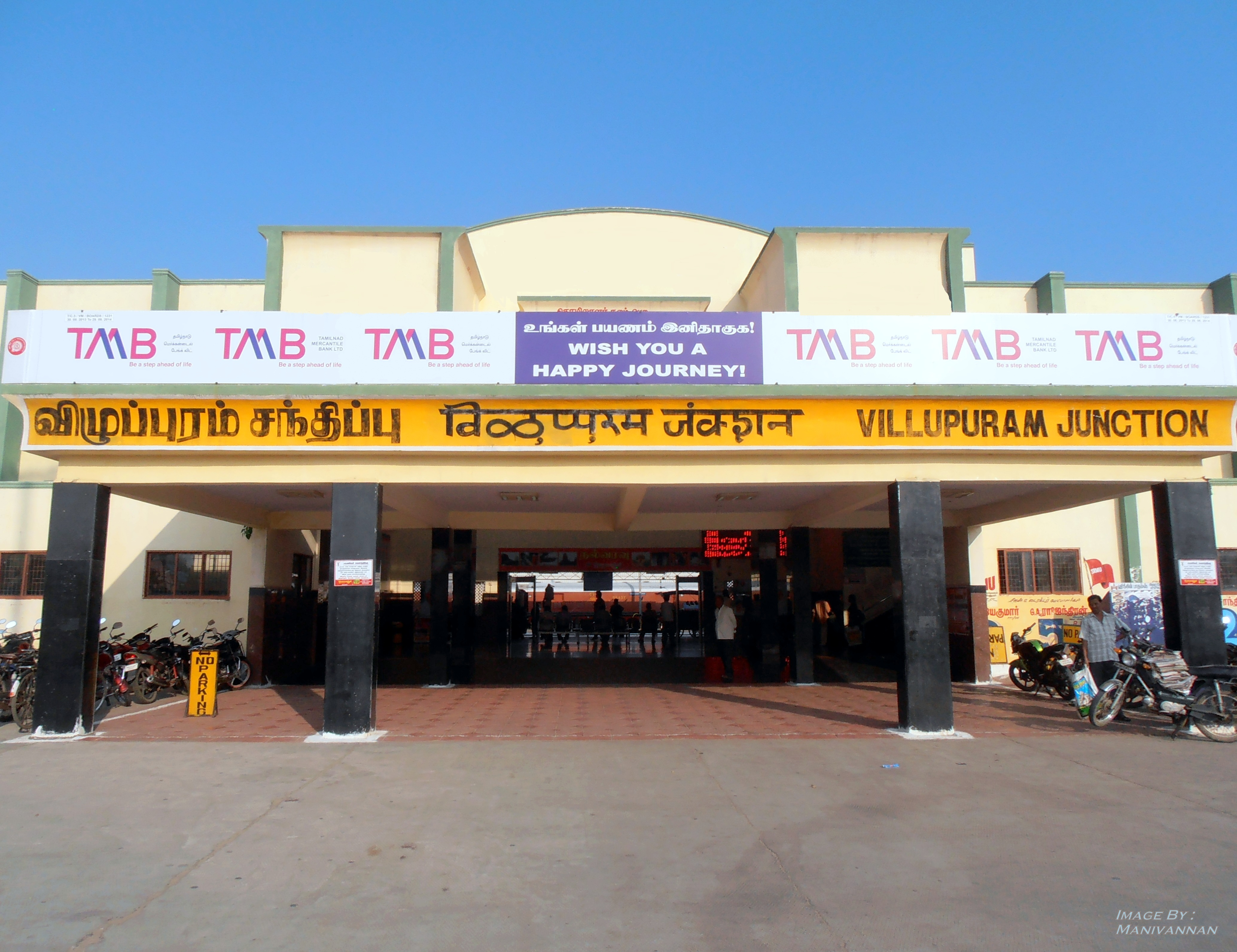
Vizhuppuram Railway Junction

The Viluppuram Railway Junction at Villupuram serves as the distribution point of rail traffic from Chennai, the state capital of Tamil Nadu, towards the southern part of the state. Five railway lines branch out of Vizhuppuram:

- Fully Electrified Double BG (Broad Gauge) line (FEDL) towards Chennai Beach via Chengulpattu Junction.
- Fully Electrified Double BG (Broad Gauge) line (FEDL) towards Tiruchirapalli Junction via Vridhachalam Junction and Ariyalur. Also called "Chord Line" to Tiruchirapalli.
- Fully Electrified Single BG (Broad Gauge) line (FEDL) towards Tiruchirapalli Junction via Cuddalore Port Junction, Mayiladuthurai, Kumbakonam and Thanjavur Junction. Also called Main Line.
- Fully Electrified Single BG (Broad Gauge) line towards Katpadi Junction via Tirukoilur Tiruvannamalai and Vellore Cantonment.
- Fully Electrified Single BG (Broad Gauge) line to Pondicherry.

=== Air ===
The nearest airport is Pondicherry Airport at Pondicherry, in Puducherry, approximately 40 km from Viluppuram. Pondicherry Airport is connected to Bangalore by commercial airlines.

The nearest major airport is the Chennai International Airport (MAA), approximately 140 km from the town; the next closest major airport is Tiruchirapalli international Airport, approximately 170 km from the town.
