= Viluppuram district =

- District of Tamil Nadu
- Vizhuppuram district
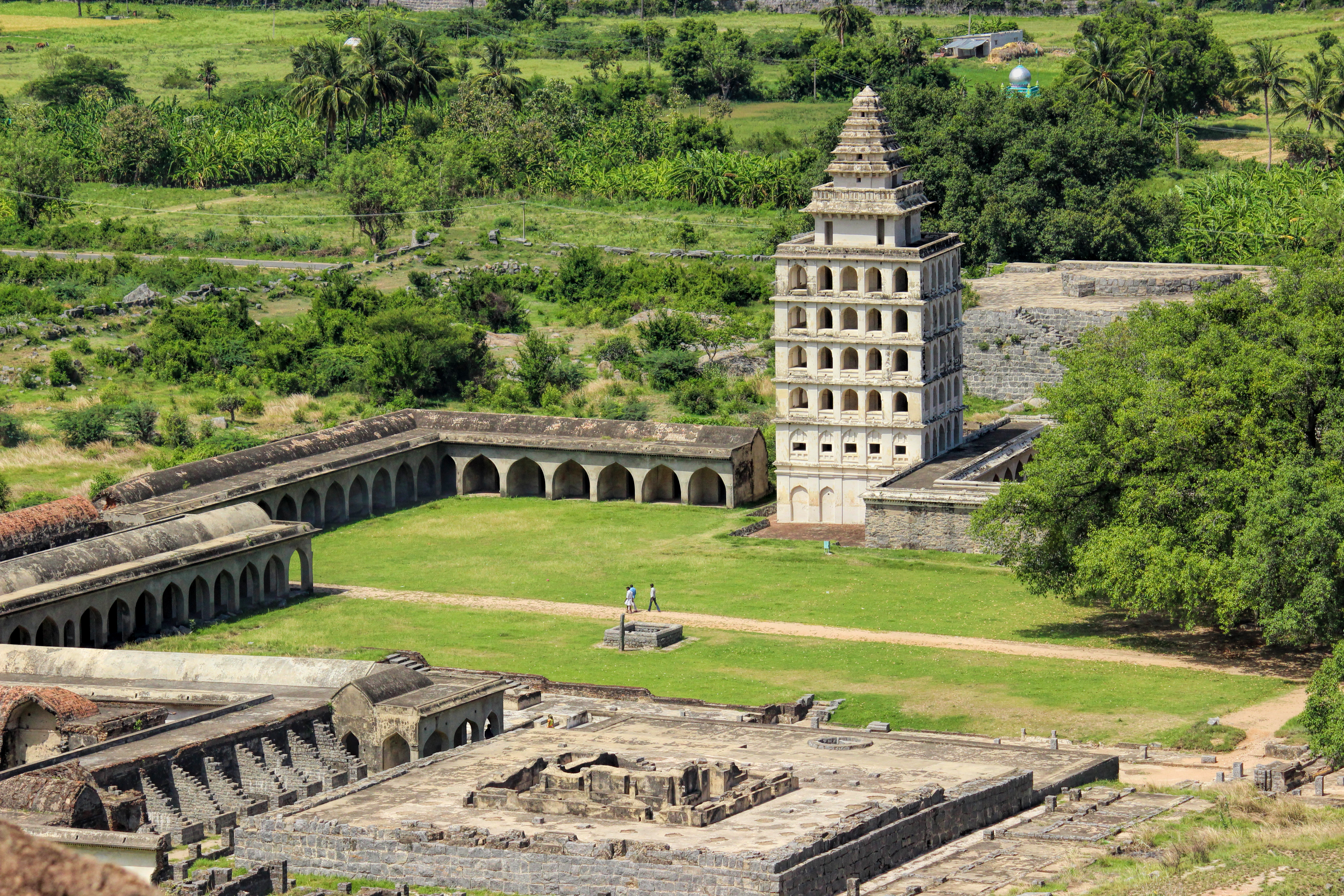
- Gingee Fort
- Vizhuppuram district Location in Tamil Nadu
- Coordinates: 11°57′16.92″N 79°31′39.83″E
- Country: India
- State: Tamil Nadu
- Municipalities: Viluppuram, Tindivanam, Kottakuppam
- Established: 1993
- Headquarters: Viluppuram
- Talukas: Gingee, Kandachipuram, Marakkanam, Melmalayanur, Tindivanam, Tiruvennainallur, Vanur, Vikravandi, Villupuram

Government
  - Collector: C. Palani, IAS, N. Shreenatha IPS (SP)

Area
  - Total: 3,725 km^{2} (1,438 sq mi)

Population (2011)
  - Total: 2,093,003
  - Rank: 11
  - Density: 561.9/km^{2} (1,455/sq mi)

Languages
  - Official: Tamil
- Time zone: UTC+5:30 (IST)
- PIN: 604xxx, 6056xx, 6062xx
- Telephone code: 04146, 04147, 04149, 04151, 04153
- Vehicle registration: TN-16, TN-32
- Sex Ratio (Per 1000): 987
- Literacy Rate: 71.88%
- Website: viluppuram.nic.in

Viluppuram district, also known as Villupuram district or Vizhuppuram district, is one of the 38 districts that make up the state of Tamil Nadu, India. It was founded on 30 September 1993, prior to which it was part of the Cuddalore district. Vizhuppuram district lies in the way of the national highway connecting Tiruchirappalli and Chennai, and contains historical landmarks like the 500 year-old Gingee Fort.

== History ==
Vizhuppuram district was once a part of the South Arcot district along with the Cuddalore district. Later, the Cuddalore district was bifurcated and Vizhuppuram district came into existence on 30 September 1993. As a result, the Vizhuppuram district's history closely resembles that of Cuddalore's.

The Cholas were among the earliest rulers. Karikala Chola was the most influential. Simhavishnu Pallava overthrew the Cholas, and the region came under the Pallava rule. Vijayalaya Chola restored the rule of Chola, marking the beginning of the Chola Empire.

The entire district became a war zone during the Anglo-French rivalry and it came under the control of the East India Company. It remained under British authority until the independence of India in 1947.

== Geography ==
The district shares borders with the Bay of Bengal in the east, Puducherry district of the union territory Puducherry in the southeast and the districts Chengalpattu and Tiruvannamalai in the north, Cuddalore in the south and Kallakurichi in the west.

== Politics ==
District	No.	Constituency	Name	Party	Alliance	Remarks
Viluppuram	70	Gingee	A. Ganeshkumar	PMK	AIADMK+	
Viluppuram	71	Mailam	C. Ve. Shanmugam	AIADMK	AIADMK+	Supported TVK; Later declared support for EPS
Viluppuram	72	Tindivanam (SC)	Vanni Arasu	VCK	TVK+	Won as SPA candidate; party switched to TVK+ post-election; Cabinet Minister
Viluppuram	73	Vanur (SC)	D. Gowtham	DMK	SPA	
Viluppuram	74	Villupuram	R. Lakshmanan	DMK	SPA	
Viluppuram	75	Vikravandi	C. Sivakumar	PMK	AIADMK+	
Viluppuram	76	Tirukkoyilur	S. Palaniswamy	AIADMK	AIADMK+	Opposed TVK

== Economy ==
In 2006, the Ministry of Panchayati Raj named Vizhuppuram one of the 250 most backward districts (out of a total of 640) in the country. It is one of the six districts in Tamil Nadu currently receiving funding from the Backward Regions Grant Fund Program (BRGFP).

== Taluks ==
Viluppuram district is composed of 9 taluks:

- Gingee
- Kandachipuram
- Marakkanam
- Melmalayanur
- Tindivanam
- Tiruvennainallur
- Vanur
- Vikravandi
- Villupuram

== Demographics ==
Historical population
Year	Pop.	±% p.a.
1901	1,237,061	—
1911	1,387,893	+1.16%
1921	1,362,937	−0.18%
1931	1,441,904	+0.56%
1941	1,532,516	+0.61%
1951	1,631,216	+0.63%
1961	1,747,460	+0.69%
1971	2,048,400	+1.60%
1981	2,373,952	+1.49%
1991	2,755,674	+1.50%
2001	2,960,373	+0.72%
2011	3,458,873	+1.57%

According to 2011 census, the Viluppuram district had a population of 3,458,873 with a sex-ratio of 987 females per 1,000 males, which is well above the national average of 929. A total of 404,106 residents were under the age of six, constituting 208,246 males and 195,860 females. Scheduled Castes and Scheduled Tribes accounted for 29.37% and 2.16% of the population, respectively.

The average literacy of the district was 63.48%, compared to the national average of 72.99%. The district had a total of 800,368 households. There were a total of 1,703,249 workers, including 322,900 farmers, 537,581 farm workers, 23,961 in household industries, 376,360 other workers, 442,447 marginal workers, 46,746 marginal farmers, 294,632 marginal farm workers, 14,276 marginal workers in household industries and 86,793 other marginal workers.

After bifurcation, the residual Viluppuram district had a population of 2,111,669. The residual district had a sex ratio of 990 females per 1000 males. 321,703 (15.23%) lived in urban areas. Scheduled Castes and Scheduled Tribes made up 28.60% and 1.16% of the population respectively.

Religions in Viluppuram district (2011)
Religion	Percent
Hinduism	92.27%
Christianity	3.71%
Islam	3.63%
Other or not stated	0.39%

Hindus are the majority religion, with 92.27% of the population. Christians and Muslims are in minority with 3.71% and 3.63% of the population respectively.

Languages of Viluppuram district (2011)
1. Tamil (97.1%)
2. Urdu (1.61%)
3. Telugu (0.93%)
4. Others (0.38%)

Tamil is the predominant language, spoken by 97.08% of the population. Urdu and Telugu are minority languages spoken by 1.61% and 0.93% of the population respectively.

== See also ==
- List of districts of Tamil Nadu
