= Kandachipuram taluk =

- Taluk
- Country: India
- State: Tamil Nadu
- District: Viluppuram
- Revenue division: Viluppuram
- Headquarters: Kandachipuram

Area
  - Total: 234 km^{2} (90 sq mi)

Population
  - Total: 151,027
  - Density: 645/km^{2} (1,670/sq mi)

Languages
  - Official: Tamil
- Time zone: UTC+5:30 (IST)

Kandachipuram taluk is one of the 9 taluks of Viluppuram district, in the Indian state of Tamil Nadu.

== Administration ==
Kandachipuram taluk is within Villupuram district, one of the 38 districts of Tamil Nadu. The taluk was created at some point between 2011 and 2019, when its area was split off from Tirukkoyilur taluk, as that taluk was still part of Viluppuram district prior to 2019. Following the 2019 bifurcation of Viluppuram district which created Kallakurichi district, the taluk's southern border was altered, as that border became part of the border between the two districts. This alteration included a change which resulted in the town panchayat of Arakandanallur becoming part of Kandachipuram taluk.

The headquarters of the taluk is its namesake, the town of Kandachipuram, which is in the northern part of the taluk. The taluk is part of the Viluppuram revenue division of Viluppuram district. It was transferred from Thirukoilur division in 2019. The taluk includes parts of the Mugaiyur and Thiruvennainallur revenue blocks. There is 1 town panchayat, 1 panchayat union, and 62 revenue villages in Kandachipuram taluk.

== Geography ==
Kandachipuram taluk is in the southwestern part of Viluppuram district, and has a total area of 234 square kilometres (90 sq mi). It is bordered by Gingee taluk to the north, Vikravandi taluk to the northeast, Viluppuram taluk to the southeast, Tiruvennainallur taluk to the south, Tirukkoyilur taluk to the west, and Tiruvannamalai district to the northwest. Parts of National Highway 38 and State Highways 7, 9, and 211 go through the taluk. A railway line passes through the taluk as well. Part of the southern border of the taluk is formed by the Ponnaiyar River. There are also several reserved forests in the taluk.

== Demographics ==
As of 2019, Kandachipuram taluk had a population of 171,027 people living in an area of 234 square kilometres (90 sq mi), resulting in a population density of 645.4/km^{2} (1,672/sq mi). The most populous settlement in the taluk is Arakandanallur Town, while other significant settlements include the headquarters of Kandachipuram, along with the villages of Veerapandi, Manampoondi and Mugaiyur.
