= Tirukoilur =

Town in Tamil Nadu

Thirukovilur Thirukoilure Thirukkovalur Tirukkoyilur
- Municipality Administration
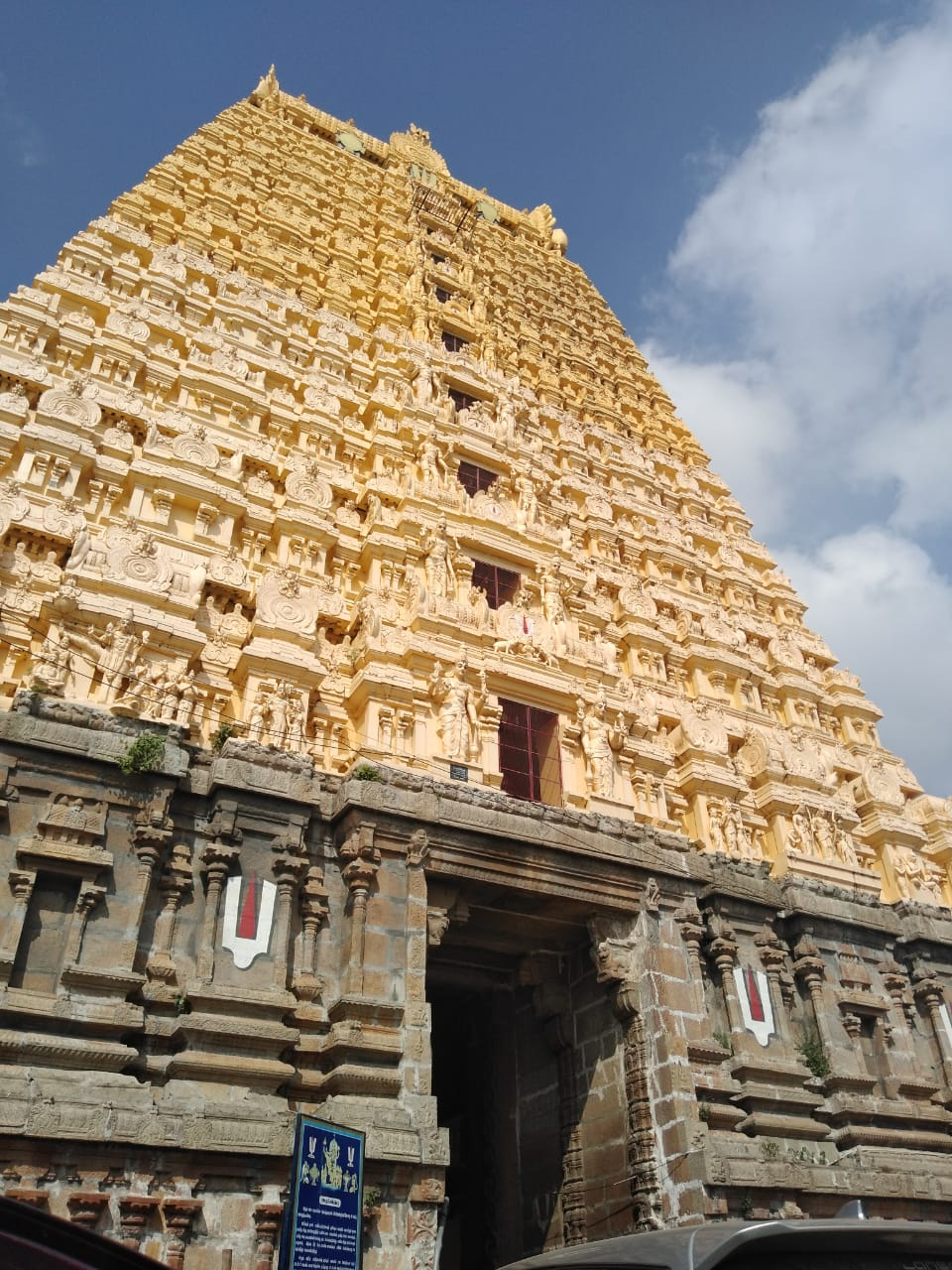
- Ulagalantha Perumal Temple
- Nicknames: Koval, Temple City
- Location in Tamil Nadu, India
- Coordinates: 11°58′03″N 79°12′20″E
- Country: India
- State: Tamil Nadu
- District: Kallakurichi district
- Named for: Temples And Heritage Town

Government
  - Type: Municipality Government Of Tamilnadu
  - Body: Commissioner Government

Area
  - Total: 11.99 km^{2} (4.63 sq mi)
- Elevation: 73 m (240 ft)

Population (2011)
  - Total: 60,212
  - Density: 5,022/km^{2} (13,010/sq mi)

Languages
  - Speaking: Tamil
- Time zone: UTC+5:30 (IST)
- Postal code: 605757
- Vehicle registration: TN-32, TN-15"
- Website: https://www.tnurbantree.tn.gov.in/tirukovilur/

Tirukoilur also spelt as Tirukkoyilur or Tirukovilur (Originally called as Koval, Kovalur or Tirukovalur ) is a Town and the Headquarters of Tirukoilur taluk in Kallakurichi district, Tamil Nadu, India. This town is located on the southern bank of Thenpennai River and famous for the Ulagalantha Perumal Temple, the Veerateeswarar Temple and the Kabilar Kundru. Tirukoilur is located on the highway connecting cities of Tiruvannamalai and Vellore with Southern Tamil Nadu. The town is served by Tirukoilur railway station (formerly, Arakandanallur Thirukovilur railway station).

Vanavan Mahadevi, the mother of Rajaraja Chola I, was born as a Tamil princess of Chera dynasty in Tirukoilur.

== Demographics ==
As of 2011 India census, Tirukoilur had a population of 60212. Males constitute 49% of the population and females 51%. Tirukoilur has an average literacy rate of 78%, higher than the national average of 59.5%: male literacy is 83%, and female literacy is 73%. In Tirukoilur, 10% of the population is under 6 years of age.

== Transport ==
Tirukoilur is well-connected by road and rail. Many state highways pass through this municipality.

State Highway 9 Tamil Nadu Cuddalore-Thirukovilur--Vellore

SH-7 Thirukoilur-Villupuram

SH-211 Thirukoilur Bye-Pass Road -Kandachipuram

State Highway 68 Tamil Nadu Cuddalore-Thirukovilur-Sankarapuram

SH-137 Thirukoilur-Elavanasurkottai-Asanur-Trichy

MDR-1014 Thirukovilur-Manalurpet-Tiruvannamalai

MDR-812 Thirukoilur-Veerapandi-Vettavalam

MDR-784 Thirukoilur-Rishivandiyam-Thiyagadurugam- Kallakurichi

MDR-785 Thirukoilur - Thagadi

== Religious significance ==
Tirukoilur is famous for the Ulagalantha Perumal Temple. This temple has a very big raja gopuram and is the 3rd longest gopuram in Tamil Nadu. The statue of Vishnu is so beautiful with varnakalapam. There is a sanathi even for Vamana. As per legend, Vishnu appeared to the mudhal Alvars (first three Alvars) at Thirukkoilur. The temple plays a special part in Vaishnavism as it is where the first three Alvars sang the first three Thiruvandadhis compiled in Naalayira Divya Prabandam, the Sri Vaishnava canon. Thirumangai Alvar, another Alvar saint also revered the deity in his verses compiled in Nalayira Divya Prabandam . Ashta Veeratanams, Ashta – eight Veeratanam – Place of Bravery. As per legends, Shiva is believed to have destroyed eight different demons namely Andakasuran, Gajasuran, Jalandasuran, Thirupuradhi, Kaman, Arjunan, Dakshan and Taaragasuran. There are eight temples built signifying each of his victories in the war, and also as places where he is believed to have performed with fury.

The eight temples are:

- Tiruvadigai Veerattaaneswarar Temple at Thiruvadigai
- Tirukkovilur Veerateshwarar Temple at Tirukoilur
- Veerateswarar temple at Korukkai or Thirukkurukkai
- Amirtagateswarar Temple at Thirukadaiyur
- Vazhuvur Verateswarar Temple at Vazhuvoor
- Keelaparasalur Veerateswarar Temple at Tirupariyalur
- Kandeeswarar Temple at Thirukkandiyur
- Tiruvirkudi Veerataneswarar Temple at Thiruvirkudi. Shiva in all these temples are described to have used bow and arrow, trident and spear.

Other significance include following:

- Ulagalantha Perumal Temple or Trivikrama Temple is a Hindu temple dedicated to Vishnu located in Tirukkoyilur, Tamil Nadu, India. As per Hindu legend, Vishnu appeared to the mudhal Alvars (first three Alvars) at Thirukkoilur. The temple plays a special part in Vaishnavism as it is where the first three Alvars sang the first three Thiruvandadhis compiled in Naalayira Divya Prabandam, the Sri Vaishnava canon. Thirumangai Alvar, another Alvar saint also revered the deity in his verses compiled in Nalayira Divya Prabandam.
- Kabilar Kundru (or Kabilar rock) is a hill rock in the middle of the Ponnaiyar River in Tirukoilur. It is known for Tamil poet Kapilar did Vadakirrutal (fast unto death) here, after his friend Vēl Pāri was killed in a battle. It is one of the protected monuments in Tamil Nadu by the Archaeological Survey of India.
- Shri Raghuttama Teerthar was one of the greatest saints of Shri Uttaradi Matha. Shri Raghuttama Teerthar entered the Brindavana at Manampundi, near Tirukoilur
- Gnananandagiri Swamigal, established his modest ashram "Sri Gnanananda Thapovanam", which is a quiet place, situated on the northern banks of Pennar river, near Thirukovilur in Tamil Nadu. Thapovanam meaning "forest of penance" is today a place of pilgrimage.

== History ==
The history of Tirukoilur is attested at least as early as the Sangam era, and has been continuously inhabited since then. The city was for most of its record ruled by the Malayaman princes as their capital of Miladunadu as a kingdom and later as vassals under different empires and regimes. The city was originally known as Kovalur in the Sangam period.

=== The Velir Warring period ===
The earliest recorded attestation is from the Tamil Sangam literary canon, circa 300 BCE-300 CE. From about circa 106 CE Malayaman Thirumudi Kari of the Malayaman dynasty ruled from his capital of Tirukovilur then, over the lands of Miladunadu, In 118CE Kari is said to have waged war upon the ruler of Thagadoor, Athiyamān Nedumān Añci, another Velir prince, this was due to his desire to become an Imperial ruler similar to the Muventhar (Three crowned kings), however, Kari would lose the war and Kovalur would be captured by Athiyamān Nedumān Añci, Kovalur then turned to be ruled under Athiyaman, and Kari would only being able to regain it much later.

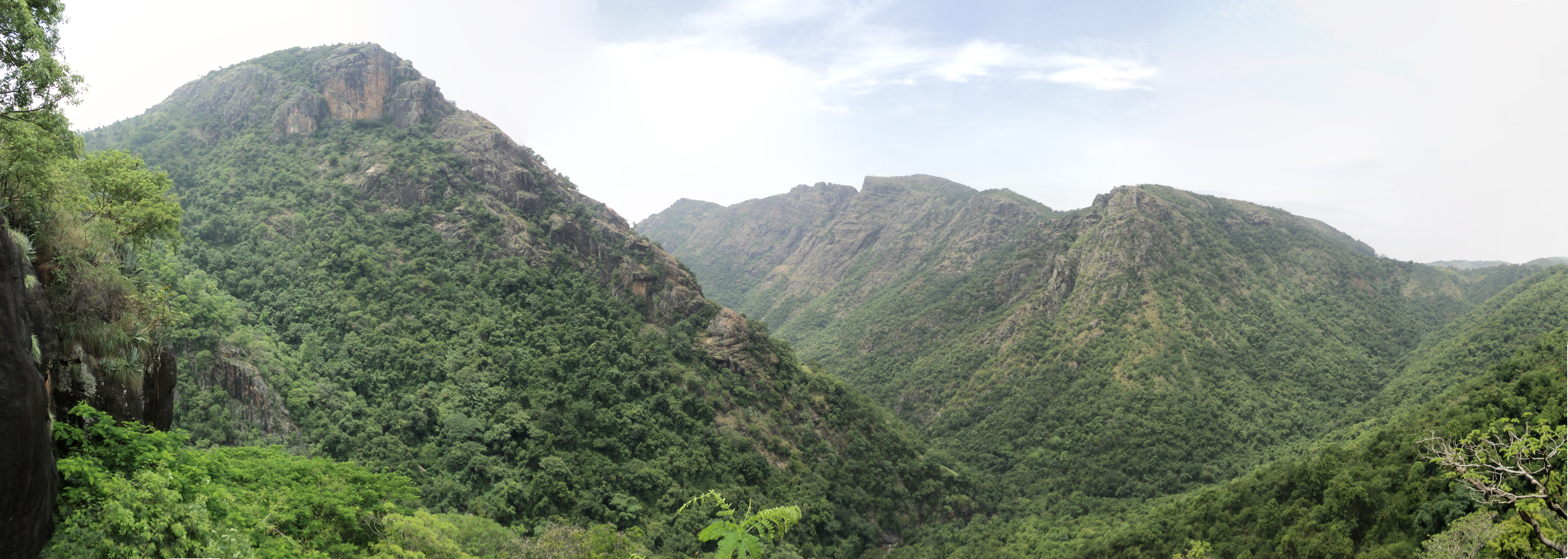
The Hills of Kollimalai ruled by the Velir Prince Valvil Ori

In 120 CE, the Chera Emperor Paalai paadiya Perum Cheral Irumporrai, struck a deal with Kari, that if he conquered Kollimalai, the Kingdom of Valvil Ori, a Velir King, then Perum Cheral Irumporrai would avenge Kari and conquer Thagadoor for him, and soon Kari had killed Valvil Ōri, and took control over Kollimalai, in return the Chera emperor sacked Thagadoor, and Kari was able to regain Kovalur, as Athiyamān Nedumān Añci's power over the city weakened and he was killed by Perum Cheral Irumporrai. The sack of Thagadoor was later recorded in the lost Sangam poetic work of the Thagadoor Yaaththirai.

The Chola Emperor, Killi Valavan, displeased of Kari's rising influence and power, laid siege over Kovalur, the war cost heavy casualties, and on the sixth day of the war, Killi Valavan captured the three-year-old twin son's of Kari, holding them hostage. Fearing for their safety, Kari turned himself over to the Chola Emperor in 122 CE, only to be killed. The emperor also had planned to crush the twin boys by running them over by mad elephant's, this was however intercepted by Kōvūr Kizhār, a court bard and poet, who dissuades the emperor and asks him to adopt the children, they were then raised under the patronage of the emperor and served as generals of the Chola army under Killi Valavan and his son Rasasuyam Vaetta Peru Nal Killi.

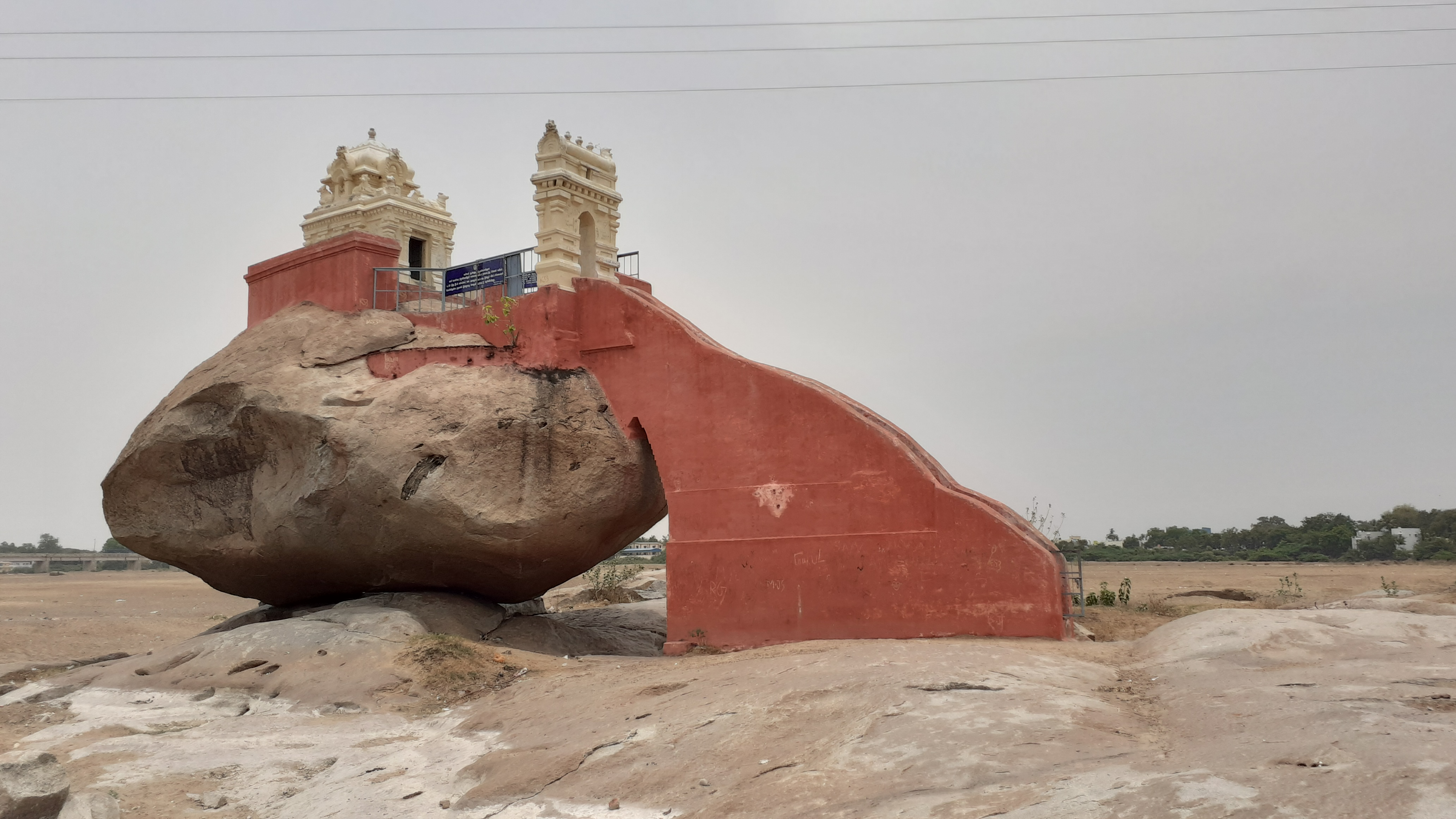
Kapilar Kundru (Kapilar's hill) in present-day Tirukoilur, Tamil Nadu, where Kapilar fasted to death due to the loss of his friend Vel Pāri.

Some years later from this period in 145-150 CE, Vel Pari, a Velir king of Parambu Nadu dies, and upon his death, his two twin daughters, now orphaned, Angavai and Sangavai were taken in by the court poet Kapilar who upon finding no one to marry the princesses leaves them under the care of the court poetess Auvaiyar, and goes and kills himself due to the grief of losing Vel Pari, by a boulder on the outskirts of Tirukoilur, the place is still venerated today as Kāpilar kundru (Kapilar's boulder). Auvaiyar later marries both the Princesses off to the twin sons of Malayaman Thirumudi Kari, Prince Deiveegan and Prince Yenadhi Kannan, who by then were reinstated as rulers of Tirukoilur. The wedding took place at Manam Poondi, a village next to Tirukoilur. After the death of Kari, Prince Malayaman Choliya Enati Tirukkannan (Yenadhi Kannan) the husband of Sangavai becomes the King of Tirukoliur and Lord of Mullur earning the title Choliya Yenadhi due to being general of the Chola army.

==== Kalabhra interregnum & rise of Chola dominance ====
A mention of the Malayaman Velir Prince Thervann Malaiyan battling against the successor to Perum Cheral Irumporrai, Emperor Yanaikatchai Mantaran Cheral Irumporai is recorded as happeing in the later half of the 2nd century BCE.

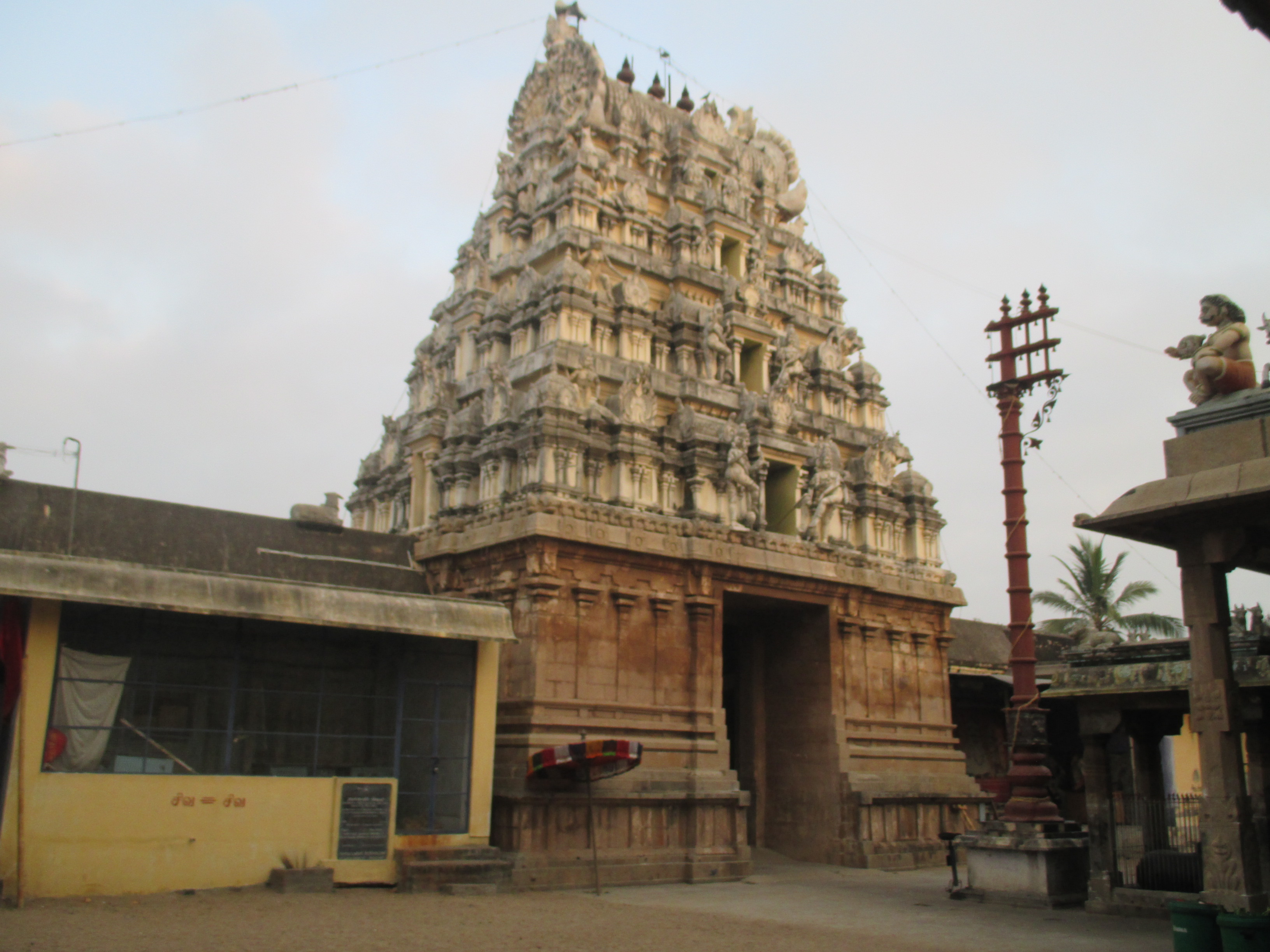
Veerateeswarar Sivan Temple in Tirukoilur, built circa 7th century CE.

Not much is known of the city post the late Sangam period during the Kalabhra era, as the Kalabhra dynasty swept across Tamilakam, toppling the original rule of the Three crowned kings, there appears to have been a dark age. Shortly afterward, In the 6th century CE, a record of the Malayamān King Meiporul Nayyānar of the Velir royal house, is known to have ruled Tirukoilur styling himself under the titles of. Miladudiyar and Cedirayar, the latter of which was done to claim validation as descent from the kingdom of Chedi. Meiporul Nayyānar was a religious devotee of the god Sivan and was charitable, while also known for his military strength and so could not be conquered. A neighbouring King Muthanathan, wanting to take over Tirokilur is said to have disguised himself as a sage of Sivan in order to see Meiporul Nayyānar and so approached and stabbed him, killing him. King Meiporul Nayyānar thus, for his religious piety became one of the 63 Nayyanar (codified saints of Sivan) and was mentioned in the Periyapuranam. The Veerateeswarar Temple in Tirukoilur was built then.

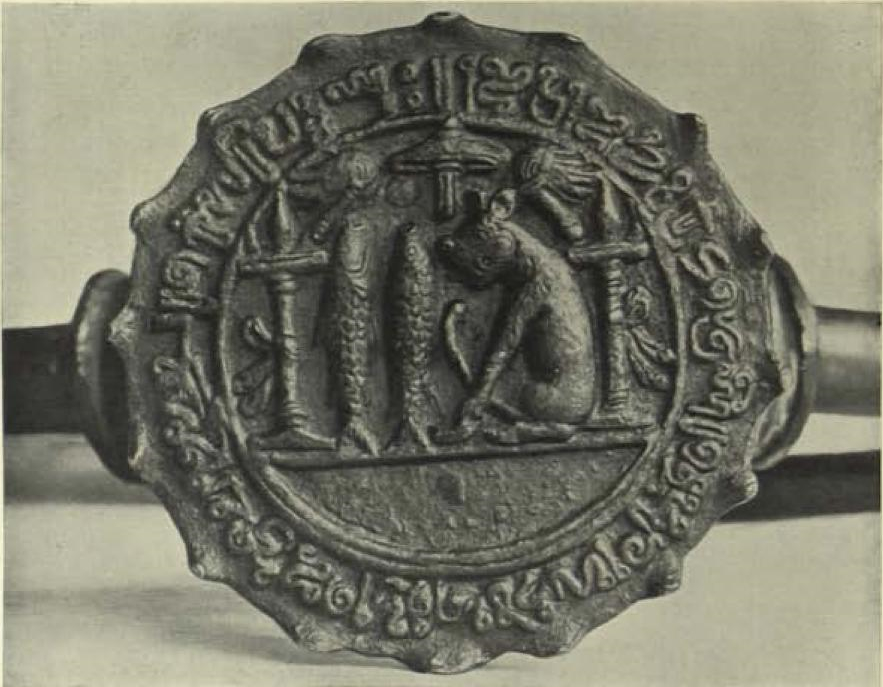
Seal of Emperor Rajaraja I, son of Velir Princess Vanavan Mahadevi.

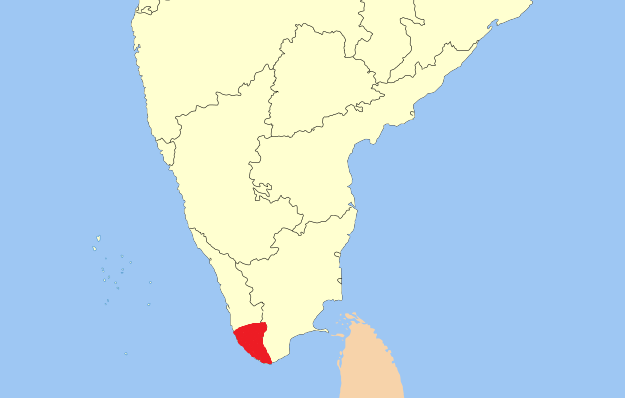
Ay Kingdom with its capital at Vizhinjam.

In about 940 CE, a marriage alliance between the Velir Princess Vannavan Māhadevi of the Malayamān family of Tirukoilur and Sundara Cholan was made, after which she became Empress. She was the mother of the famous Chola Emperor Raja raja I, Crown Prince Aditya Karikalan and Princess Kundavai pirāttiyār who were all born in Tirukoilur, according to inscriptions. Around the same time, in the early mid 9th century, Princess Siddhavadavan Suttiyar of the Malayamān house from Tirukoilur, marries Prince Uttama Cholan, becoming Queen when he was reinstated as Emperor in 971CE. Throughout the reign of Rajaraja I, the city of Tirukoilur became highly decorated and both Rajaraja cholan I and his son, Rajendra cholan I invested highly in the temples and donated and restored many of them, the ruler of Tirukoilur then was Miladudāiyar Prince Raman Siddhavadāvan, who also adopted the style of Chedirayar. The sovereignty over Tirukoilur and Miladunadu however, came under the suzeranity of the Chola empire, and became a vassal state.

Around 985 CE the ruler of Tirukoilur was the Malayaman Prince Rama Devan, and the city soon shifted from being a capital, to becoming a grand and powerful fortified citadel due to the advances of the Chola Empire. During the same period, the Ay-Vels of the Ay kingdom, had weakened after the siege of Rajaraja I upon Vizhinjam in 988 CE and following sacks by Rajendra cholan I and Rajadhiraja cholan I, this fragmented the kingdom and the lineal descendants of the last Ay king Vikramaditya Varaguna who was the son of King Karunandadakkan, moved to Parthivapuram, the south eastern outpost of the declining Ay kingdom, and in 1145 CE fled the city as their kingdom collapsed and they moved eastwards and northwards into Tondaimandalam, marring into the old Malayamān branch who belonged to the line of Yenadhi Kannan and Vannavan Mahadevi, doing so in order to stop Chola persecution. In 1058 CE Prince Narasimavarman of the Malayāman house, along with Emperor Virarajendra Chola is said to have restored the Ulagalantha Perumal Temple in Tirukkoilyur.

In the late 11th century CE, the Malayaman Prince Vikrāmachola Chedirayan is said to have ruled over the city. As the Chola Empire weakened under Rajadhirajan II and Kulatonga Cholan II, the city of Tirukoilur under the Malayamān dynasty grew much more independent and established different cadet branches namely the Kiliyur branch who resided in Tirukoilur calling themselves Chedirāyan, Malayamān and Akāsuran, the Adaiyur branch who ruled from next to Tiruvannamalai, used the titles of Malaiyān and Malayakularayar, this is likely the branch the Ay members married into, the Jambai branch using Surieyn and neriyen. In circa 1195CE The Malyamān Prince Suriyan Nirerran Edirigālnāyan reigned over Tirukoilur during the rule of the Chola Emperor Kulattonga III. This period saw a confluence of Hoysalas, Kadavarayars sweep across the plains of Tondaimandalam creating instability in the region, the Malayamān Prince Periya Udaiyan Irāiyurān ruled over the city from 1210 to 1235 AD, during this conflating period, when the last Chola Emperor Rajendra Chola III slowly started to fall, loosing Tirukoilur and the northern Tondaimandalam region completely.

==== Collapse of the Chola Empire and Pandya restoration ====
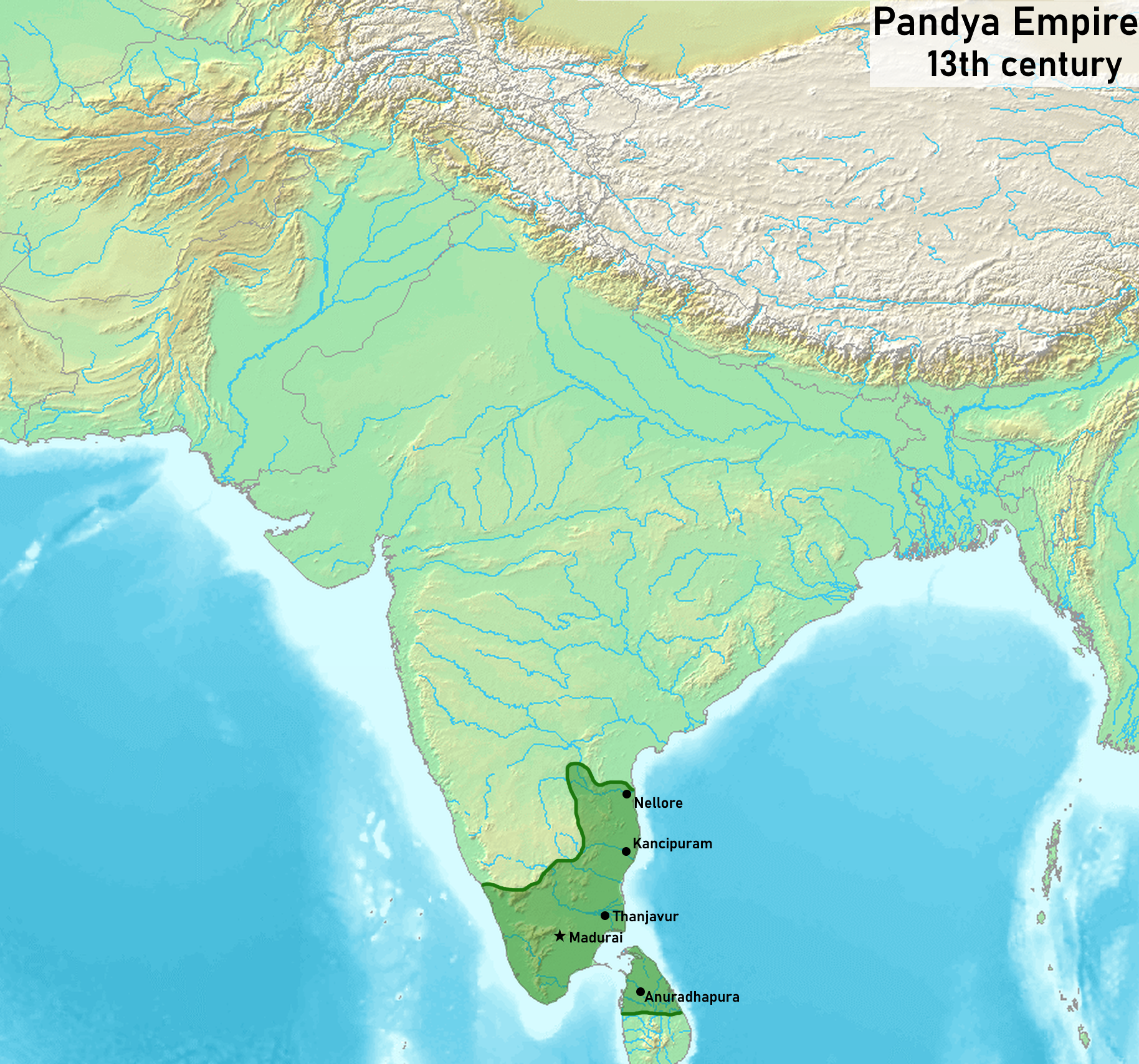
The Pandya Empire during the mid-late 13th century, consisting of Tirukoilur.

As the Chola empire started to dissolve in around 1200 AD increasing encrochment came from the Hoysalas, which allowed the restoration of the second Pandya Empire, The city of Tirukoilur then was ruled by different Malayamān's mostly from the Kiliyur linage, one of them being Prince Periya Udaiyan Iraiyuran Sarrukkudadan who ruled in circa 1210-1235 AD, inscriptions describe him employing special guards, who were trained to commit suicide than reveal the whereabouts of where he was. Headed by the Pandya Emperor Jatavarman Sundara Pandyan I, who conquered many of the northern frontiers under his reign the second Pandya Empire consolidated itself. This period saw one of the most notable Malayamān Princes of Tirukolir under Pandya rule, Malayamān Āḷappirandān Mīnavan Chēdirāyan who was a direct vassal under Jatavarman Sundara Pandyan I.

The following decades from 1260 AD onwards saw the breakage of the Malayamān linage, with the final vassals under the Pandyan empire, being Malayamān Perumal Chēdirāyan and Malayamān Minavan Chēdirāyan II are said to have ruled Tirkoilur. However, a late inscription mentions members of the Adaiyur Malayamān family's presence in the city along with the Killiyur branch as patrons of the Ulagalantha Perumal temple. The Pandya period however diminished the autonomy of the Kiliyur Malayamāns ruling Tirukoilur, as the Empire directly allocated the collection and distribution of taxes unilaterally.

==== Raids of Malik Kafur and the dark ages ====
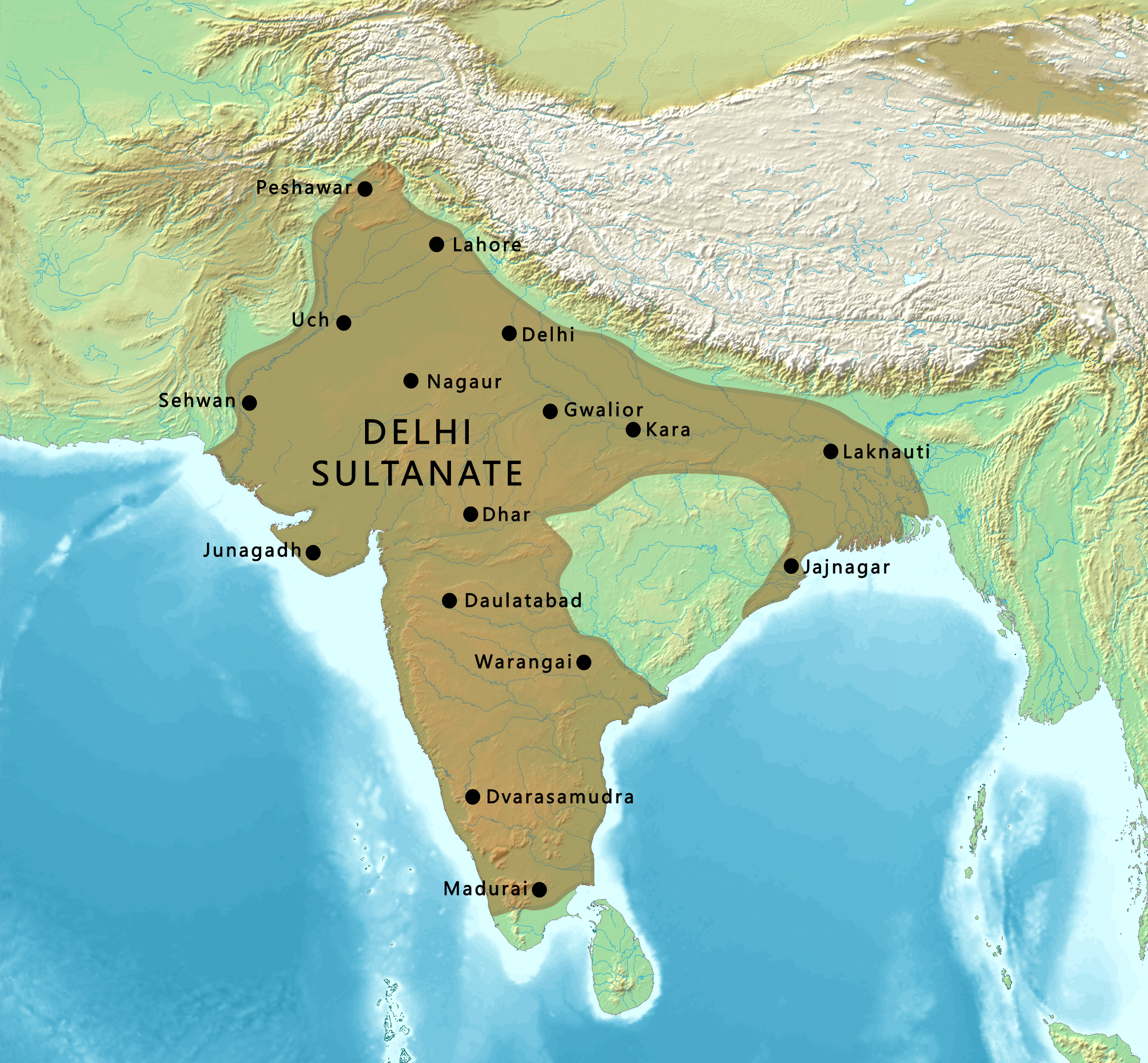
The Delhi Sultanate at the height of its power in 1330, after raids across the Pandya Empire.

In 1311 AD, the already weakening Killiyur Malayamān lineage ruling Tirukoilur under the suzeranity of the Pandya empire came to a halt, as Malik Kafur a General with an army from the Delhi Sultanate, came into the territory of the Pandya Empire, which was caught in a fight over family succession between the Princes Vira and Sundara Pandyan upon the death of Emperor Maravarman Kulashekhara. This army led by Malik Kafur had raided several treasuries, granaries and elephant hordes in the region, the Ulagalantha Perumal temple had its gateways walled with brick in order to stop any plundering.

The city itself has sparse records during this time, by when, the Pandya Empire had been desolated and dissolved. The infighting between the two Pandya princes continued to cause much instability in the region, with Prince Sundara Pandya ruling the northern parts of the empire, and Prince Vira Pandya from Chidambaram in the South. During this time, a Venad King, Ravivarman Kulaśēkhara who was a vassal under Emperor Maravarman Kulashekhara who also happened to be his son-in-law, declared himself independent due to the weakened Pandyan Empire, sided with Sundara Pandya in the north and Vira Pandyan in the south, crowning himself in Madurai and soon conquered much of the lands east of the western Ghats, including Tirukoilur in 1312 CE, he did not raid Tirukoilur and the Ulagalantha Perumal temple, as the Kiliyur branch of the Malayamāns were by then fragmented, Malayman Pillai Perumal Chedirayan was noted as ruling then. In 1313 CE King Ravivarman Kulaśēkhara crowned himself again, in Kanchi ousting a Chola King, Manma Siddha III, thus declared himself Tribhuvana Chakravartin (ruler of the three worlds). But this was short lived as the insurgence of the Kakatiyas and Hoysalas spurred Ravivarman Kulaśēkhara to go back to Venadu. The Sambuvarayar's then claimed the areas around Tirukoilur in an insurgence led by Veerasampa Raja, The Killiyur branch are no longer recorded after this, the Adaiyur branch survive in Tiruvanamalai, as mentioned in inscriptions of the Veerateeswarar temple. In 1335 CE, an offshoot of Malik Kafur's army separated from the Delhi Sultanate and declared itself the Madurai Sultanate and exerted control over the southern part of Tamilakam. The Madurai sultanate heavily taxed the surrounding regions leading to large cessation of usual activity.

==== Rise and fall of the Vijayanagra Empire ====
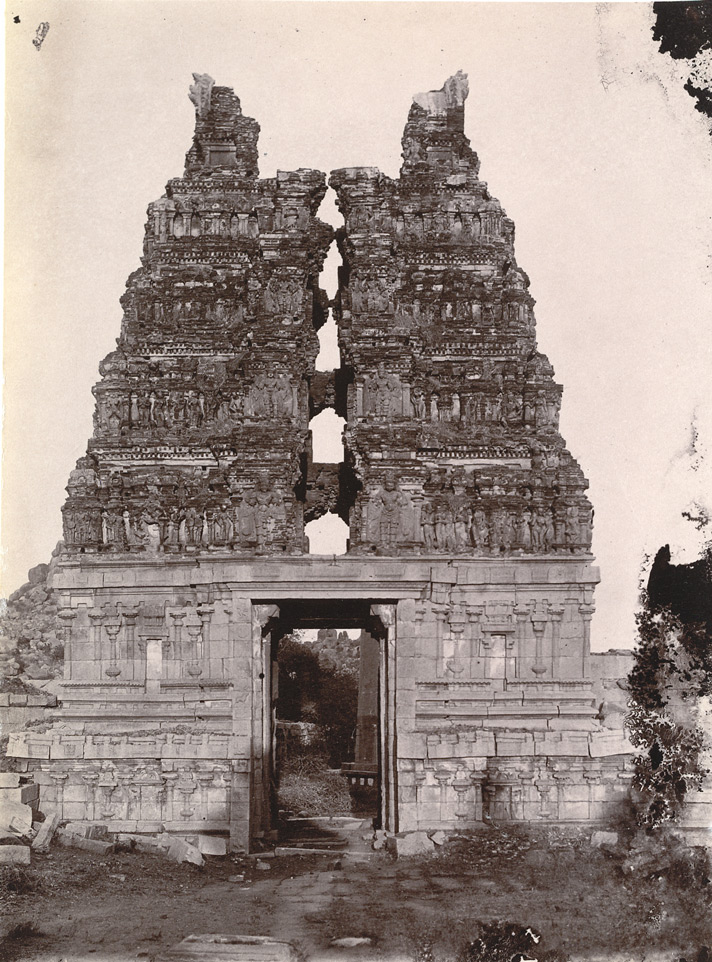
Pattabhirama Temple, Hampi, Built Vijayanagra era. (photo circa 1880s)

In circa 1371, the newly oncoming Vijayanagra Empire from the Telugu region, soon overtook Arcot and took over the Madurai Sultanate, led by Prince Kumara Kamappa son of King Bukka Raya I who captured Tirukoilur in the process. In circa 1404 CE, under the reign of the Vijayanagra Emperor Harihara Raya II, the city is heavily garrisoned and made to have textile making industries. the ruling Malayamāns of Tirukoilur likely transitioned into diminished status but and posted to be administrators or, being the Adhikari (adminstator) of Tirukoilur during that time, any remaining of the Chedirayar Malayamāns are not recorded. In circa 1432 CE under the reign of the Emperor Devaraya II, the city established a monetary system with an urbanised commercial economy and cash fluidity.

In 1446 upon the enthronement of Prince Mallikarjuna Raya into Emperor of the Vijayanagra Empire, due to his weak rule, an other powerful force the Gajapati Rajas of Odisha and their empire, made its way southwards, capturing Kanchipuram, and Tiruchirapalli. And so, in circa 1453 CE the temple records, show that the entirety of the city of Tirukoilur was transformed to a fortified citadel like garrison, due to oncoming waves of the Gajapati rajas, with parts of the Veerarteeswarar temple repurposed into a fortified structure. After the death of Mallikarjuna Raya, his son Virupaksha Raya II also led a similar reign, resulting in losses of large territories, upon his death in 1485CE, Saluva Narasimha Deva Rayar usurped the throne after a coup, and installed himself as Emperor of the Vijayanagra empire, his cousin, Saluva Gopa Timma Maharaja, a high ranking noble and military general consolidated the power of the empire, and laid away the traditional feudal principality structure into the centralised, Nayakattanam system, where appointed Nayakars ( governors) would be the rulers of a fiefdom, which Tirukoilur was placed under. Upon the death of Saluva Narasimha Deva Rayar, his sons too young to rule, were kept under stewardship of his prime minister Tuluva Narasa Nayaka, under whom his first son Thimma Bhupala who was killed by an external agent, and the second son Immidi Narasimha Saluva was kept under house arrest and only Tuluva Narasa Nayaka ruled as regent, and in 1503 CE, upon his death, his son Viranarasimha Raya, killed Immidi, ending the Saluva dynasty, and crowning himself Emperor establishing the Tuluva Dynasty in 1505CE.

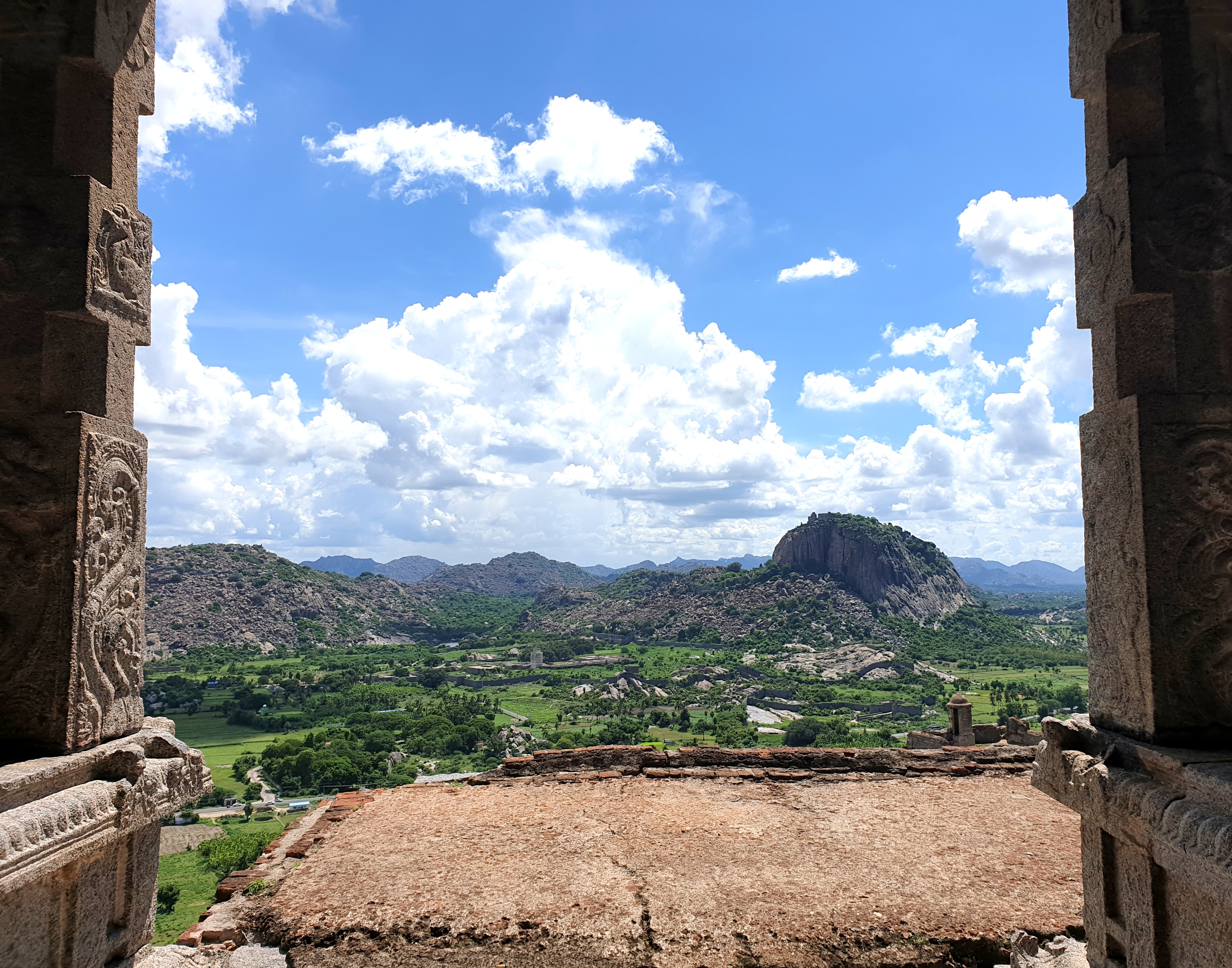
Durgams (Hill-forts) of Gingee.

However, in 1509 CE, Viranarasimha Raya now on his deathbed supposedly wished for his son to be heir so instructed his General and prime minister, Saluva Timmarusu to kill his half brother Krishnadevaraya and bring him his eyes, but Timmarusu did not do so, and in 1509 CE, Krishnadevaraya was crowned Emperor of the Vijayanagra Empire. Krishnadevaraya enacted many laws, during this period tirukoilur's administrative system was completely changed, where autonomy of rule, went to the newly reinstated Gingee Nayakas (Viceroys of Gingee), under Tubaki Krishnappa Nayak, within which Tirukoilur's administration came to be. In circa 1511 CE Timmarasu established a Durgam (hill fort) by Tiruvannamalai, which was supposed to be one of the supportive hill-forts of the Gingee, it was later called "Thimayyarajah Durgam" (Timmarasu's hill fort). In 1565 CE, during the battle of Talikola, where Rama Raya, a son-in-law to Krishnadevaraya who acted as regent, and went against the Sultanate of Bijapur, and was ousted and killed. There is information on a copper-plate in 1610 CE possibly of a donation of land to the temple, by members of the Adaiyur branch, indicating the branch was still present then. The entirety of Tirukoilur and its area came under the rule of the Nayaks of Gingee, with the any remaining Malayamāns present in Tiruvanamalai possibly acting as minor subsidiary fiefs over the area, till 1648 CE, where Tirukoliur which was administered purely centralised had now been overrun and conquered by the Bijapur sultanate.

==== The Sultanates and the Carnatic wars ====
The city of Tirukoilur was captured by the Bijapur sultanate in 1648 CE, and from then to about 1650CE the surronding regions. Frequent raids would take place. The Sultanate restricted movement further, and in 1658 CE Tirukoilur became came under control under the Bijapur Sultanate. In 1677 CE as the Maratha King Chhatrapathi Shivaji lay siege to Gingee and captured it, any reignning rulers paid tax towards the marathas however, many temple properties according to the Tirukoilur inscriptions are said to have been restored. In 1690 CE the Mughals under Auragzeb lay siege over Gingee and many of the Maratha confederacies. The original ruling Malayaman dynasty had become fragmented and certain offshots however likley transitioned into local Polygars and chieftains.

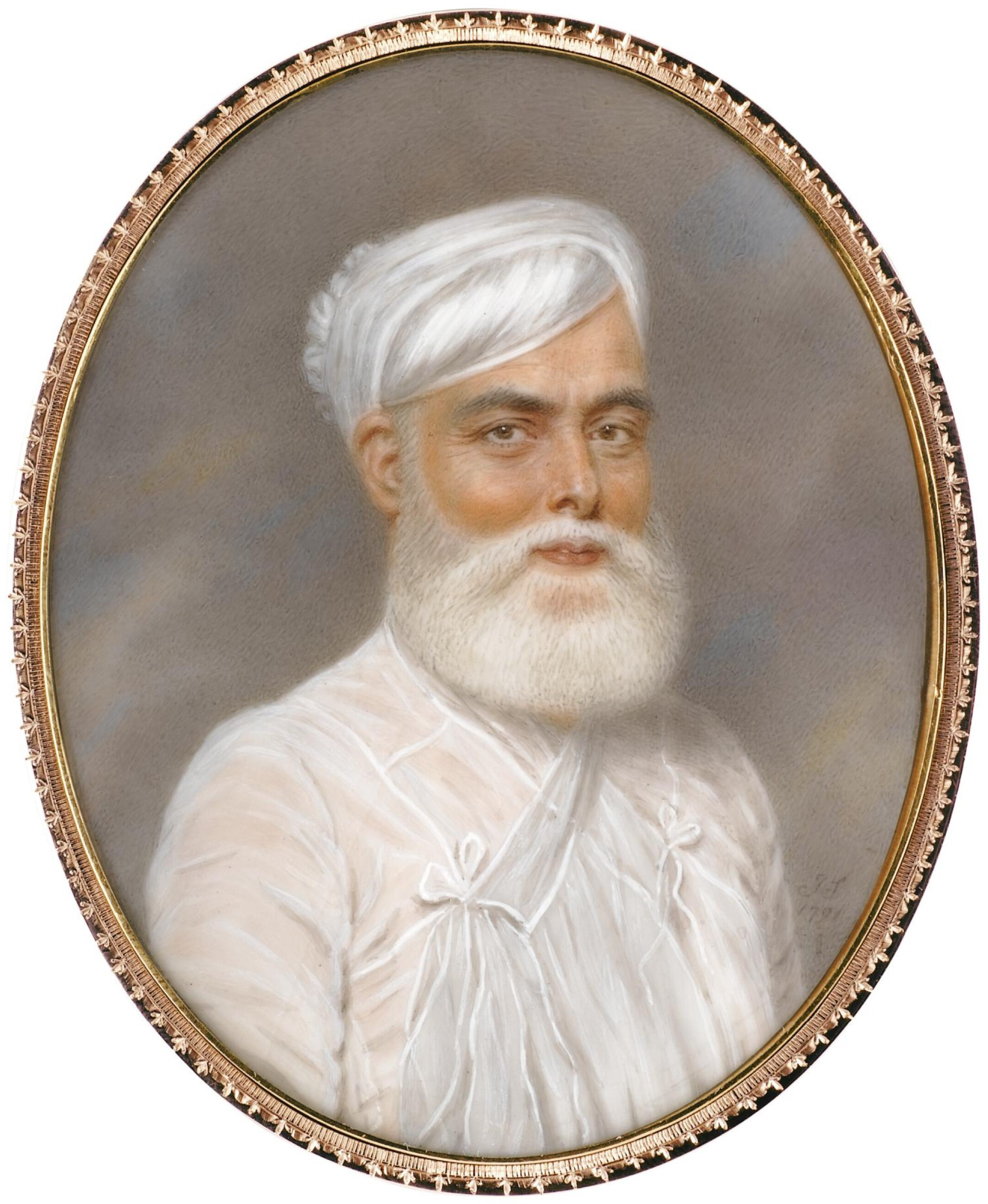
Muhammad 'Ali Khan, Nawab of Arcot and Prince of the Carnatic.

==== The Colonial period and Morden day ====
Tirukoilur transitioned into a town under the British Raj, as they acquired the lands of the Carnatic from the Nawab. And the town became a revenue earning department, there are no rulers after this period for the town, and inscriptions become scarce, and stop altogether after the early mid 19th century.

== In popular culture ==
There is a story that, while on a visit to Ceylon, the ancient female Tamil poet Avvaiyar was caught up in a torrential rain, and took shelter in the house of two women, Angavay and Sangavay. These women took care of Avvai with great kindness and promised that they will be given in marriage to the King of Tirucovalur. On hearing this the King agreed to take the women in marriage if they were given away by the Chera, Chola and the Pandya. Avvai then makes an invocation to Ganesha for making the invitation on a palmyra leaf, on which Ganesha appears before her. On receiving the invitation the three kings come for marriage and give away Angavay and Sangavay in marriage (pp. 57–59). There is a mention of this time period in Ponniyin Selvan.
