= Kandachipuram =

- Village
- Location in Tamil Nadu, India Kandachipuram (India)
- Coordinates: 12°02′22″N 79°18′01″E
- Country: India
- State: Tamil Nadu
- District: Viluppuram
- Taluk: Kandachipuram

Area
  - Total: 6.08 km^{2} (2.35 sq mi)

Population (2021)
  - Total: 11,113
  - Density: 1,830/km^{2} (4,730/sq mi)
- Time zone: UTC+5:30 (IST)

Kandachipuram is a village in the Kandachipuram taluk of Viluppuram district, in the Indian state of Tamil Nadu. It is the headquarters of its namesake taluk, but was previously in Tirukkoyilur taluk, when that taluk and the entirety of Kallakurichi district were still part of Villupuram district.

== Geography ==
Kandachipuram covers 6.08 square kilometres (2.35 sq mi) of land in the northern part of the taluk, which is in the southwestern part of the district. It is located 13 kilometres (8.1 mi) northeast of Tirukoilur, the headquarters of the taluk which it used to be within, 23 kilometres (14 mi) northwest of Viluppuram, the district headquarters, and 150 kilometres (93 mi) southwest of the state capital of Chennai. The village is at the intersection of National Highway 38 and State Highway 211.

== Demographics ==
In 2011 Kandachipuram had a population of 6,659 people living in 1,595 households. 3,325 (49.93%) of the inhabitants were male, while 3,334 (50.07%) were female. 723 children in the town, about 10.9% of the population, were at or below the age of 6. 69.0% of the population was literate, with the male rate of 75.6% being notably higher than the female rate of 62.4%. Scheduled Castes and Scheduled Tribes accounted for 23.3% and 3.66% of the population, respectively.
