= Eravalam =

Coordinates: 11°55′N 79°13′E

Eravalam is a tiny village in Tirukoilur, Kallakurichi district, Tamil Nadu, India. A new sugar mill is planned, spread across the villages of Venmar, Eravalam, Kachikuppam and Keezhthazhanur, and this has generated some controversy.

== Main cultivation of the village ==
- Sugar cane
- Paddy
- Ragi
- Maravalli
