= Adaiyur =

Adaiyur may refer to:

== India ==
=== Tamil Nadu ===
- Adaiyur, Salem, a village in Idappadi taluk of Salem district
- Adaiyur, Tiruvannamalai, a village in Tiruvannamalai taluk of Tiruvannamalai district
- Adaiyur, Villupuram, a village in Ulundurpet taluka of Villupuram district
