= Ravivarman Kulaśēkhara =

Ravivarman
- Kulasekharan Perumal
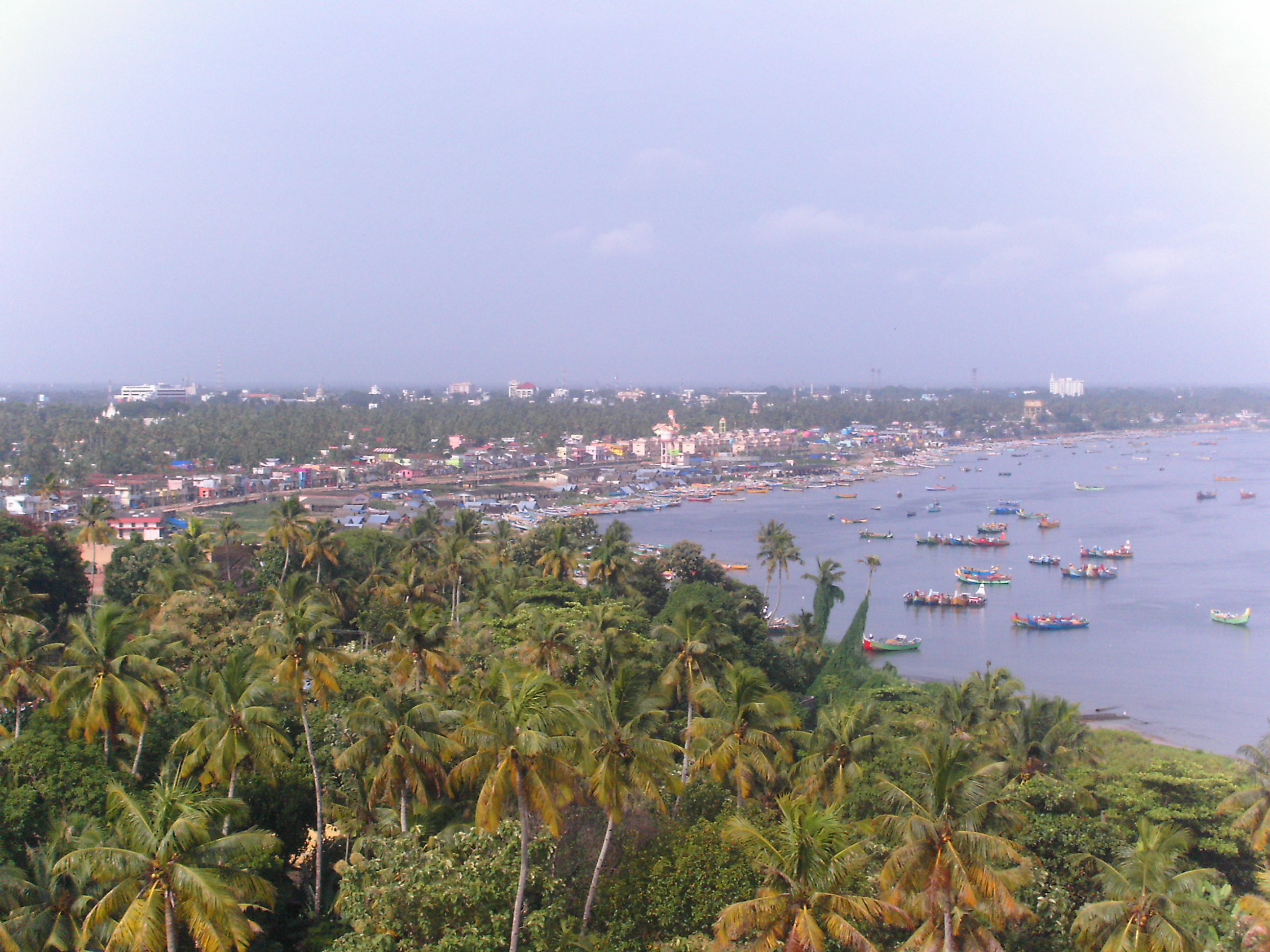
- Kollam in south India

King of Venatu (Quilon)
- Reign: 1299 – 1316/7 c. 1299 - 1317 c. 1299 - 1316
- Coronation: 1299, 1309 (Quilon); 1312 (Madurai); 1312/3 (Kanchi)
- Predecessor: Jayasimhadeva
- Successor: Udaya Marttanda Varma
- Born: 1266 – 67
- Died: 1316/7
- House: Kulasekharan (Venatu Chera) dynasty
- Father: Jayasimhadeva (fl. 1266 – 67)
- Mother: Umadevi of the Kupaka
- Religion: Hinduism

Ravivarman (c. 1266/7 – 1316/7), styled Maharaja Ravivarman, Kulasekharan was the ruler of Venatu, with capital at port Kolambam (Quilon), southern India between 1299 – 1316/7. He – in all likelihood – was a descendant of the ancient Cheras through his father and was the son-in-law of the Pandya ruler of Maravarman Kulasekhara. Ravivarman raided large parts of southern India in a short period (1312 – 1316) by skillfully taking advantage of the weakening of the Pandya kingdom and the confusion prevailed after the Khalji raids (1311).

Coins issued by Ravivarman with the legend "Kulasekharan" were discovered by archaeologists. Probably to commemorate his conquest of the Pandya realm, he issued the coin with his crest elephant (the Chera symbol) on the obverse and the name Kulasekhara over the Pandya crest (the two fishes) on the reverse. In a Telugu record (1317 AD) of the Kakatiya ruler Prataparudra II, he is called "Malayala Tiruvadi Kulasekhara".

Ravivarman was an ardent devotee of Padmanabha (Vishnu) at Trivandrum, Kerala. The term "Padmanabhapadadasa" was apparently first used by Ravivarman Kulasekhara.

== Early life ==
Venatu is the region lying between Cape Comorin, Trivandrum, and Quilon in present-day southern Kerala with its capital at the latter place. The rulers of Venatu, the Kulasekhara/Venatu Chera dynasty, were intermittently independent vassals of the Pandyas of Madurai. They fought against the Pandyas for supremacy over the fertile plains of Kottar and Nanjanatu. They entered into several matrimonial alliances with the Pandyas rulers, and maintained oscillating relations with them.

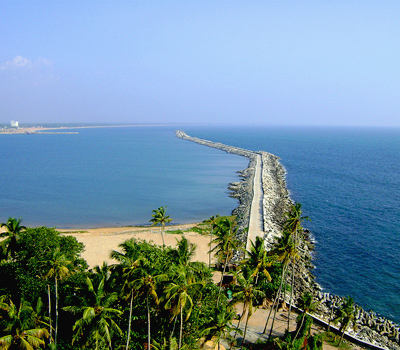
Kollam in southern Kerala. Ravivarman Kulasekhara proudly styles himself as the Ruler of Kollam

In the 13th century, the Pandyas of Madurai established their "most recent" hegemony over Venatu Cheras. Pandya rulers such as Jatavarman Sundara Pandya (1251 – 1268) and Maravarman Kulasekhara (1268 – 1310) conducted military raids over Venatu. A Sanskrit inscription at Chidambaram Temple, Cuddalore district speaks of the murder of the "Kerala" king by Jatavarma Sundara Pandya. In keeping with K. A. N. Sastri, Jatavarman Sundara Pandya proceeded against the Chera (Kerala) king Viraravi Udaya Marttanda Varma with a very small force and destroyed him and his forces in a battle and ravaged Venatu (the Malaimandala). Maravarman is very likely to have led military expeditions against Venatu, perhaps suppressing a local rising, and captured the capital city Quilon. He took the titles "Cherane Venra" and "Kollam Konda" indicating his over-lordship of Venatu. A number of inscriptions of Vira Pandya, the co-regent of Sundara Pandya are visible in Nanjanatu. Some authors conclude that Nanjanatu was under the control of a Sundara Chola Pandyadeva until 1262 AD. The Pandya control over Venatu is shown by the Chalai Inscription mentioning the regnal year of Maravarman Kulasekhara while referring to Ravivarman, the son of Jayasimha also.

Following the Sanskrit inscriptions, in Grantha characters, at Ranganathasvamy Temple, Srirangam Ravivarman was born in the Saka year 1188 (as given in chronogram "dehavyapya") corresponding to 1266 – 67 AD. (Note: It records that the king set up an image of Ranganatha, celebrated the festival of lights and provide for payment, on the day of Shatabhisha in the month of Kanya, i.e., Purattasi, of 100 panas each to 50 learned men. The inscription in verse, is said to have been composed by poet Bhushana.) Like other princes in the royal family, he was educated privately. He was adopted by the childless queen Āvani Amma Tampuran of Āttingal.

The ruler of Vēnāṭu throughout this period (1266 – 67 AD) was "Vira Kerala" Jayasimhadēva/Dēśinga Tēvar. According to Ravivarman's inscriptions, his father belonged to Yadu and Chandra Kula. Ravivarman's mother Umadevi, of the Kūpaka (modern-day Attingal) family, was a joint ruler with Jayasimha. His death at Quilon signaled the outbreak of a long and disruptive succession struggle in Vēnāṭu between his sons and nephews. Ravivarman, the son of Umadevi, was a major contender to the throne after the death of his father. He came out successful in the succession struggle and ascended the throne of Quilon in 1299-1300, at the age of 33 (Saka 1221). For more than a decade, he ruled as a vassal under the Pandya ruler Maravarman Kulasekhara, as is evidenced by the Trivandrum Chalai Inscription in which he uses the Pāndya title "Māravarman" along with his name.

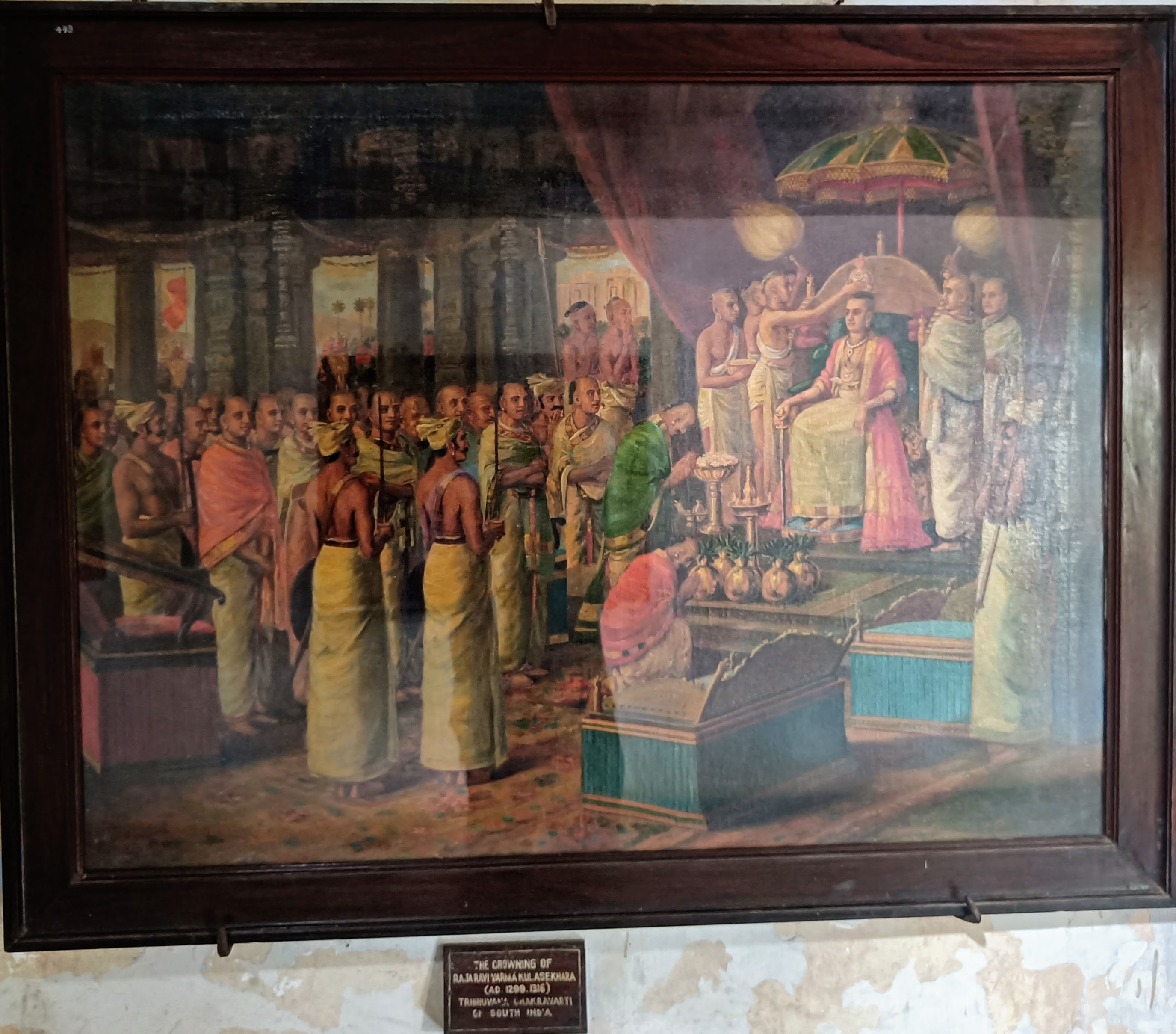
Coronation of Ravivarman Kulasekhara as 'Tribhuavana Chakravarti of South India' at Kanchi, 1312 A.D.

He probably adopted the imperial Pandya title "Kulasekhara" also [may be after the death of Maravarman Kulasekhara]. The Venatu succession given by Pillai and A. S. Menon – from Jayasimha to Ravivarman – is contested by some scholars. Conforming to Vielles's reading of the Lilatilakam, certain Kota Marttanda Varman was ruler of Venatu in 1266 – 67 AD. Ravivarman seems to be his sister's son, the sister being Umadevi.

There is a tradition that an adoption into the Venatu family of two princesses from Kolattunatu (Kannur) royal family took place around 1304 - 1305 AD. The adoption must have arranged because Ravivarman's sister had no daughter and consequently, there were no remaining princes in the female line after Ravivarman's two nephews Marttanda and Champaka Kerala.

Ravivarman married the daughter of the Pandya ruler Maravarman Kulasekhara at the age of thirty-three (1299-1300). This marriage will form the core of his legal argument of having been the heir to throne of Madurai. The famous 14th century AD Manipravala grammar Lilatilakam confirms this marriage alliance. It seems Ravivarmam defeated Vikrama Pandya, who perhaps attempted to extend his power over Venatu, and presumably handed him over to Maravarman Kulasekhara and the latter was so pleased with Ravivarman that he gave him his daughter in marriage. An inscription of Vikrama Pandya from Chidambaram refers to his exploits in Venatu. While comparing Ravivarman with Krishna, poet Bhusana writes that the king was attached to no other women than his own wife.

== Conflicts ==
When the Pandya king Māravarman Kulaśēkhara was apparently killed some time before May, 1310, Ravivarman "declared" independence from the Pāndyas. It is assumed that he began to count his regnal years afresh from 29 December; thus the Tiruvati Inscription of the Kali year 4414 (29 December 1313) may be seen to co-incide with the fourth regnal year of Ravivarman. The succession struggle between princes Sundara and Vira Pandya, sons of Maravarman Kulasekhara, and the confusion created by the Khaljī general Malik Kāfūr’s south Indian expedition (1311) helped Ravivarman in his ambitions. The distracted political conditions in Pāndya kingdom gave him an admirable opportunity to plan raids to territories east of the Western Ghats. Prior to his raids in 1312 AD, almost certainly, Ravivarman professed allegiance to Sundara Pandya. By November, 1310 Vira Pandya was in the ascendancy, after an overwhelming victory over his brother Sundara.

Ravivarman started raiding the Pāndya kingdom in 1312 AD, deep in the Tamil homeland, and defeated the armies of prince Vira Pandya. His presence at Madurai prevented Vira Pandya's return thither. Soon the entire Pāndya regions, once ruled by Jatavarman Sundara Pandya, came under Ravivarman. He performed his coronation at the Pandya capital Madurai (1312) and then continued his march northwards. His presence at Virattaneswaram Temple, Tiruvati, South Arcot is attested by an inscription dated to December, 1313. He reinstated the Pari family, a line of the Malayamans as rulers of Tirukoilur in 1312.

He performed another coronation at the Telugu-Choda capital Kanchi, on the bank of River Vegavati, in 1312 - 13 after ejecting the weakened Chola monarch Manma Siddha III, Raya Gandagopala. At the time of the coronation at Kanchi, he was 46 years old, in accordance with inscription at Varadarajaswami Temple, Kanchi. He crowned himself as the Tribhuvana Chakravarti - the ruler of Chera, Chola, and Pandya kingdoms - at Kanchi. A Kanchipuram Inscription - dated to 1315- 16 - says that Ravivarman again defeated Vira Pandya and drove him into "Konkana" and from there into the forests, and then [again] conquered the northern country. Ravivarman also defeated Sundara, as said in the Ponamallee Inscription, the brother of Vira Pandya. If we are to believe A. S. Menon, the military garrisons established in the region by Malik Kāfūr were expelled by him in the expedition. Vira Pandya may have joined hands with Ravivarman in the midst his effort. Ravivarman established supremacy over most of the region between Cape Comorin and Madras, and as far north as Nellore.

The Narasimha shrine in the Varadarajaswami Temple accommodates four sub-shrines, one among them is dedicated to certain "Malayala Nachchiar". The devi is consecrated in a separate shrine. Some scholars assume that the devi was installed here as a gift of the Chera family, represented by Ravivarman, to the god Varadaraja. The reference to "Cherakulavalli Nachchiar" in an epigraph of this temple lends plausibility to this surmise. At Srirangam, king "Kulasekhara" is said to have given his daughter Cherakulavalli in marriage to god Ranganatha and done extensive constructional activities in the third prakara. It is hence called as "Kulasekharan Tiruvidi".

Ravivarman's position at Kanchi, around 1,000 miles away from his capital Kollam, was precarious and perilous. Yadava ruler of Devagiri Samkara was executed by Malik Kafur, the general of Delhi Sultan Alaud-din Khalji, in 1312 upon withholding the tribute promised. Kakatiya ruler of Warangal Pratapa Rudra II appears in several records from Kurnool, Nellore, Cuddapah and Guntur districts as a powerful monarch. Hoysala Ballala III is recognised as reigning in most of the Mysore state from Dorasamudra. The Hoysala prince Vira Ballala was earlier carried captive by Malik Kafur to Sultanate capital Delhi. Prince Jatavarman Sundara Pandya is recorded as ruling in South Arcot in January, 1314. Maravarman Kulasekhara Pandya II is known to have controlled Tanjore in December, 1315 and Trichy in January, 1316. Manma Siddha III, Ranganatha Rajagopala, appears in an inscription from Nellore from March, 1316.

Ravivarman's hold over Kanchi was only short-lived and his aggressive activities were arrested by the Kakatiya ruler of Warangal, Prataparudra II (1295 - 1326). A southern Hoysala march is also attributed as a reason for Ravivarman's sudden retreat. Sundara Pandya had appealed to the Kakatiya ruler for military aid. The Kakatiya army under the command of Muppidi Nayaka (Devari Nāyaka, governor of Nellore) marched to Kanchi in early 1316, and captured the city in sometime between March and June, 1316. The army defeated Vira Pandya and Ravivarman Kulasekhara at Tiruvadikundram and established Sundara Pandya at Viradhavalam (Bir Dhul). The village Tiruvadikundram may be identified with Tiruvadikunram in the Ginjee taluk of the South Arcot district. Muppidi Nayaka's presence is also attested at Srirangam, further south in the Tamil land. Ravivarma ceded some of the conquered territory to the Warangal, and was compelled to withdraw to Venatu. Muppidi Nayaka installed as governor of Kanchi a certain "Mana Vira", whom Dr. Hultzsch believes to have been Manma Siddha Ganda Gopala of the Telugu Choda family. There is also assumption that Kanchi was captured from Ravivarman by the Pandyas themselves, before being defeated by the Kakatiyas. The mention in the Kakatiya inscription of defeating the "Five Pandyas" and the Venatu ruler Kulasekhara supports this argument. (Note: There is a Telugu inscription – in Grantha script, dated in 1317 AD – of Kakatiya king Prataparudra Deva in Śrīraṅgam. It states that while Pratāpadēva was ruling from Warangal, his commander Dēvari Nāyaka marched with an army to the south against the Five Pāṇḍyas, defeated Vīra-Pāṇḍya and the Malayāḷa [Vēnatu] king [Ravivarman] Kulaśēkhara at Tiruvadikuṇḍram and established Sundara-Pāṇḍya at Vīradhāvaḷam. The village Tiruvadikuṇḍram may be identified with Tiruvadikunram in the Ginjee taluk of the South Arcot district.)

Following A. S. Menon, Ravivarman died at Quilon due to natural causes. He was followed by his nephew, Udaya Marttanda Varma (ruled 1312/13 – 1344), who ruled only in Travancore. (Note: Keralapuram Inscription of Udaya Marttanda Varma Tiruvadiyar, dated to AD 1316-17, states that he was crowned four years ago. i. e. in 1312-13 AD) He may have lost his life when defeated at Kanchi by Muppidi Nayaka, but there is no proof of this. An undated Srirangam Inscription, which names the father of Marttanda as Godesvara, confirms this "marumakkattaya" mode of succession. The inscription was commissioned by Marttanda's younger brother Champaka Kerala.

The Pandya overlordship of over parts of Venatu continued even during early 14th century, as shown by the reference to a Vira Pandya in an epigraph by Vira Udaya Marttanda Varma. However, Marttanda Varma acted as an autonomous chief while making the grant. Hoysala Ballala continued rule from Dorasamudra, and Kakatiya Pratapa Rudra in southern Andhra. Sultan Alaud-din Khalji died in 1316, which was followed by the assassination of Malik Kafur. The Pandya king Maravarman Kulasekhara II ruled central Tamil Nadu, including Tanjore, and Jatavarman Vira Pandya in southern Tamil Nadu. His authority over Tinnevelly is attested in October, 1317.

The legacy of Ravivarman's raids to Madurai and Kanchi was the emergence of a new branch of the Venatu ruling family called "Desinganatu". According to E. K. Pillai and A. S. Menon, Ravivarman is the last Venatu ruler came to the throne according to the patrilineal system of royal succession [from father to son] for from the accession of the next ruler till the time of the last ruler of Travancore the matrilineal law of inheritance decided royal succession. In this system of inheritance, the son of the late ruler's sisters would inherit the throne, in order of their age. This view of the sudden shift to the marumakkattayam in the royal family is contested in some recent studies, most notably that by Vielle (2011).

== Inscriptions ==
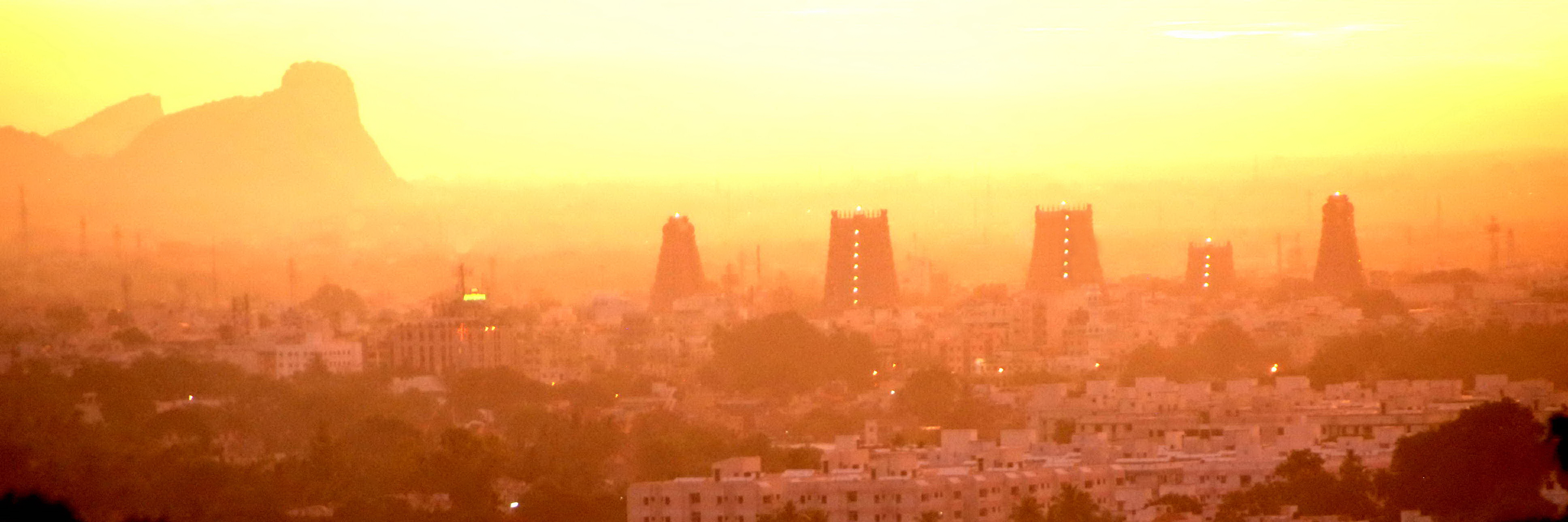
Madurai in central Tamil Nadu. Ravivarman Kulasekhara raided Madurai in 1312 AD

The Sanskrit – Tamil inscriptions of Ravivarman, and those assumed to be engraved by him, can be found at:

- Kanchipuram (Varadarajaswami Temple, on giving donations to Arulala Perumal Vishnu Temple) - dated to 4th regnal year (Sanskrit)
- Srirangam (Ranganatha Temple) (Sanskrit) - dated to 4th regnal year
- Tiruvati (Virattaneswaram Temple, Tiruvadigai, South Arcot) - dated to 4th regnal year - 29 December 1313 (Sanskrit)
- Valavur Temple - dated to 5th regnal year
- Poonamallee (Puvirundavalliperumal Temple, Puntamalli) near Chennai (Sanskrit). Ravivarman's insignia in the Poonamallee Inscription has the Chera Elephant Goad above the Pandya emblem Two Fishes and the Chola emblem Tiger.
- Chidambaram Inscription of Maravarma Tribhuvana Chaktravartin Vira Kerala alias Kulasekharadeva, "the Pandya king" - dated to 4th regnal year
- Salaigramam (Siva Temple, Chalai Village) at Trivandrum (Sanskrit)
- Perunagar Inscription of Ravi Varma Vira Pandya
- Thiruppankili (Tiruppangili in Trichinopoly district) (Sanskrit) - dated to 4th regnal year

In the epigraphs, he describes himself as the Samgramadhira i.e. the one firm in battle, the descendant from the Chandra Kula and the Yadava line, the overlord of Kerala, the Kupaka, the Lord of the Kolamba city, the Bhoja of the South, the Devotee of Sri Padmanabha, the son of Jayasimha and the Kulasekhara monarch. In some inscriptions, such as the one in Trivandrum, he describes himself as "Dharma Maharaja". The Pandya royal title "Maravarman" was also adopted by Ravivarman in some epigraphs.

Historians are of the opinion that the last 18 verses of the Srirangam Inscription forms a separate poem composed by Kavi Bhushana as indicated at the end of the inscription. While comparing Ravivarman with Krishna, Kavibhusana writes that the king was attached to no other women than his own wife.

== Cultural contributions ==
Apart from his military brilliance, Ravivarman is also noted for his services in the field of [Hindu] religion, arts and trade. His court attracted scholars and authors such as Samudrabandha - the commentator of the works of Alankarasarvaswa - and Kavi Bushana. The king also claims to be a talented musician and author. He supposedly wrote the famous Sanskrit drama Pradymnabhyudayam specifically for the purpose of being staged in the Sri Padmanābha Swāmi temple in Travancore. The Sri Rangam Inscription calls him the Master as well as the Protector of the three Vedas. The Srirangam records emphasise the restoration of the Ranganatha temple at Srirangam after its destruction by the Muslims.

As stated by Vielle, the Jaiminiya Samhita of the Brahmanda Purana was probably composed in Kerala under reign of Ravivarman Kulasekhara.
