= Meiporul Nayanar =

Hindu poet-saint

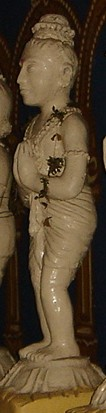

Personal life
- Born: Tirukkoyilur
- Honors: Nayanar saint

Religious life
- Religion: Hinduism
- Philosophy: Shaivism, Bhakti

Meiporul Nayanar known as Meypporul Nayanar, Meipporul (Meypporul), Meiporular, Meypporular, Maiporul Nayanar and Miladudaiyar is a Nayanar saint, venerated in the Hindu sect of Shaivism. He is generally counted as the fifth in the list of 63 Nayanars.

== Life ==
The life of Meiporul Nayanar is described in the Periya Puranam by Sekkizhar (12th century), which is a hagiography of the 63 Nayanars.

Meiporul Nayanar was the chieftain of Miladu Nadu, with his capital at Tirukkoyilur, modern-day Tirukoilur, Viluppuram district in the Indian state of Tamil Nadu. Tirukkoyilur is known for its Veeratteswarar temple dedicated to Shiva. Meiporul Nayanar belonged to the Malayamān dynasty of the Velir royal house. His name "Meiporul" means "one for whom God was the sole reality". Miladudaiyar is a title indicating him being a Miladu chief.

A devout devotee of the god Shiva (the patron of Shaivism), Meiporul Nayanar served the god in his temples as well as his devotees. He organised glorious pujas in Shiva temples. The kingdom flourished along with Shaivism and the arts. Muthanathan, king of a neighbouring state, became envious of Tirukkoyilur's prosperity. He attacked Tirukkoyilur numerous times, but was vanquished by Meiporul Nayanar's troops each time. Following this, Muthanathan understood that he could never defeat Meiporul Nayanar by fair means and devised a devious stratagem.

Muthanathan arrived in Tirukkoyilur, disguised himself as a Shaiva ascetic (yogi). The guards let him through and finally he reached the king's bed chambers, guarded by Dathan. While Dathan dissuaded the ascetic from entering since the king was resting, Muthanathan insisted that he wanted to teach the king the knowledge of gaining emancipation. Dathan let him through; the wife woke up seeing the ascetic enter and awakened the king. Muthanathan said that he had come to educate Meiporul in the secret knowledge, imparted to him by Shiva himself and requested privacy with the king. Meiporul sent off his queen and guards away. Meiporul placed Muthanathan on a high seat, while he sat at the feet of ascetic. Muthanathan removed a dagger hidden in a scroll and stabbed the king. Dathan, who was suspicious of the ascetic's intentions from the beginning, had hid in the room and rushed to the king's chamber and attacked the ascetic. As Dathan was about to strike the ascetic with his sword, Meiporul dissuaded him saying as a Shaiva, the ascetic was related to Meiporul and commanded him to ensure the ascetic is escorted unharmed to the boundary of the kingdom. While the king's subjects charged at the false ascetic, Dathan prevented them from inflicting harm on Muthanathan, informing them of the king's orders. Dathan accompanied Muthanathan outside the city and left him in an uninhabited forest, where no one could harm him. Dathan returned to the king and conveyed the news of the safety of the ascetic. Meiporul called his ministers, wife and kin to his death-bed and advised them to propagate Shaivism. He closed his eyes and meditated on Shiva. Shiva appeared before him and blessed him. Shiva took Meiporul Nayanar to Kailash, his abode. In the name of Dathan, there is a place called 'Thathanur' in Ariyalur district near Jeyamkondam. It is believed that the Dathan's descendants were part of Rajendra Chozhan-I military force and settled in this area.

The tale of Meiporul Nayanar (called Cedi Vallabha in the account) is also recalled in the 13th-century Telugu Basava Purana of Palkuriki Somanatha in brief and with some variation. The king derives his name from his kingdom Cedi. He adores the external Shaiva symbols like the Tripundra (three horizontal lines of sacred ash on his forehead) and the rudraksha beads worn by Shiavas. Foreign kings defeated by Vallabha sent thirteen warriors in guise of Shaivas. Vallabha bowed to the devotees, who fatally wounded the king with their swords. In spite of their actions, the king bowed to them, revering them as his gurus. Shiva appeared before him and granted him an "exalted and eternal status". In Kannada, Meiporul Nayanar is known as Cediraja, the king of Cedi. The kingdom of Cedi existed around Tirukkoyilur.

== Remembrance ==
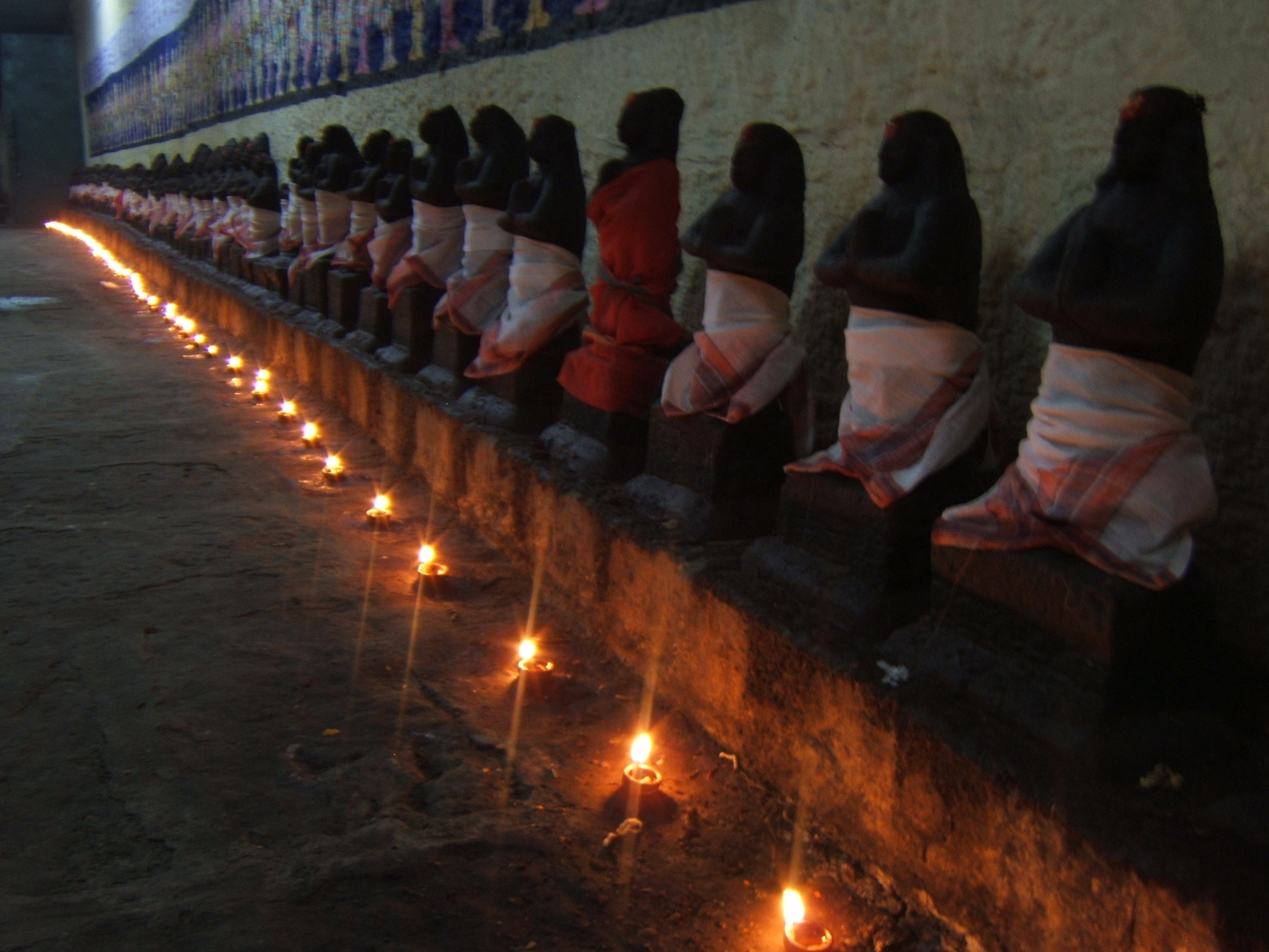
The images of the Nayanars are found in many Shiva temples in Tamil Nadu.

One of the most prominent Nayanars, Sundarar (8th century) venerates Meiporul Nayanar in the Tiruthonda Thogai, a hymn to Nayanar saints, praising as invincible.

An inscription by Aditya I (reign: c. 871–907 CE) in the Naganathaswami (Shiva) Temple of Thirunageswaram - part of a now ruined shrine - suggests that the shrine may be dedicated to Meiporul Nayanar. Another theory suggests that the record is talking about a school or monastery in honour of the Nayanar, who lived in the period close to Aditya I. However, the theories are disputed.

A stone record in the temple suggest that in the third year of the reign of Rajendra Chola I (reign: 1012–1044 CE), a royal officer Adittan Suryan set up a copper image of Meiporul Nayanar in the Brihadeeswarar Temple (dedicated to Shiva) of Thanjavur, built by his father. The stories of Meiporul and other Nayanars, whose copper images are installed, are "alluded to in the groups of copper images set up by various royal officers in the temple".

Meiporul Nayanar is worshipped in the Tamil month of Karthikai, when the moon enters the Uttara Phalgunī nakshatra (lunar mansion). He is depicted like a king with a crown and folded hands (see Anjali mudra). He receives collective worship as part of the 63 Nayanars. Their icons and brief accounts of his deeds are found in many Shiva temples in Tamil Nadu. Their images are taken out in procession in festivals.
