= Arasur =

- Village
- Location in Tamil Nadu, India Arasur (India)
- Coordinates: 11°49′48″N 79°25′34″E
- Country: India
- State: Tamil Nadu
- District: Viluppuram
- Taluk: Thiruvennainallur

Area
  - Total: 6.79 km^{2} (2.62 sq mi)

Population (2011)
  - Total: 6,321
  - Density: 931/km^{2} (2,410/sq mi)
- Time zone: UTC+5:30 (IST)

Arasur is a revenue village in the Thiruvennainallur taluk of Viluppuram district, in the Indian state of Tamil Nadu, and the headquarters of Arasur revenue block.

== Geography ==
Arasur is within Thiruvennainallur taluk, which is in the southwestern part of Viluppuram district. It covers 6.79 square kilometres (2.62 sq mi) of land in the southeastern part of the taluk. The village is at the intersection of National Highway 38 and State Highway 68, and is located 7 kilometres (4.3 mi) southeast of Thiruvennainallur, the taluk headquarters, 12 kilometres (7.5 mi) southwest of Viluppuram, the district headquarters, and 150 kilometres (93 mi) southwest of the state capital of Chennai.

== Demographics ==
In 2011 Arasur had a population of 3,021 people living in 687 households. 1,547 (51.2%) of the inhabitants were male, while 1,474 (48.8%) were female. 368 children in the town, about 12.2% of the population, were at or below the age of 6. 63.0% of the population was literate, with the male rate of 71.8% being notably higher than the female rate of 53.9%. Scheduled Castes and Scheduled Tribes accounted for 46.8% and 0.03% of the population, respectively.

== Education ==
- Maharaja Institute of Technology
