= Thiruvennainallur taluk =

- Taluk
- Country: India
- State: Tamil Nadu
- District: Viluppuram
- Revenue division: Viluppuram
- Headquarters: Thiruvennainallur

Area
  - Total: 248 km^{2} (96 sq mi)

Population
  - Total: 160,954
  - Density: 649/km^{2} (1,680/sq mi)

Languages
  - Official: Tamil
- Time zone: UTC+5:30 (IST)

Thiruvennainallur taluk is one of the 9 taluks of Viluppuram district in the Indian state of Tamil Nadu.

== Administration ==
Thiruvennainallur taluk is within the Viluppuram revenue division of Viluppuram district, one of the 38 districts of Tamil Nadu. The taluk, which has its headquarters in its namesake town of Thiruvennainallur, was created in 2019 as part of the bifurcation of Viluppuram district. To create the taluk, three revenue blocks were split off from Ulunderpet and Tirukkoyilur taluks. Those revenue blocks, Sithalingamadam, Thiruvennainallur, and Arasur, are now the constituent blocks of Thiruvennainallur taluk. These blocks are composed of one panchayat union, one town panchayat, 70 revenue villages, and 58 village panchayats.

The taluk is within the state assembly constituencies of Tirukkoyilur and Ulundurpet, and within the Lok Sabha constituency of Viluppuram.

== Geography ==
Thiruvennainallur taluk covers an area of 248 square kilometres (96 sq mi) in the southwestern part of Viluppuram district. It is bordered to the north by Kandachipuram taluk, to the northeast by Viluppuram taluk, to the southeast by the Panruti taluk of Cuddalore district, and to the south and west by the Ulunderpet and Tirukkoyilur taluks of Kallakurichi district, respectively. Parts of National Highway 38 and State Highways 9, 68, and 69 go through the taluk. The Thenpennai River runs through the taluk, and defines parts of its northern border.

== Demographics ==
As of 2019, Thiruvennainallur taluk had a population of 151,027 people living in an area of 234 square kilometres (90 sq mi), resulting in a population density of 645.4/km^{2} (1,672/sq mi). The largest settlements in the taluk are the headquarters of Thiruvennainallur, and the villages of Sithalingamadam and Anathur.
