= Sithalingamadam =

- Village
- Location in Tamil Nadu, India Sithalingamadam (India)
- Coordinates: 11°55′42″N 79°17′06″E
- Country: India
- State: Tamil Nadu
- District: Viluppuram
- Taluk: Thiruvennainallur

Area
  - Total: 8.72 km^{2} (3.37 sq mi)

Population (2011)
  - Total: 6,801
  - Density: 780/km^{2} (2,020/sq mi)
- Time zone: UTC+5:30 (IST)

Sithalingamadam is a revenue village in the Thiruvennainallur taluk of Viluppuram district, in the Indian state of Tamil Nadu, and the headquarters of Sithalingamadam revenue block.

== Geography ==
Sithalingamadam is within Thiruvennainallur taluk, which is in the southwestern part of Viluppuram district. It covers 8.72 square kilometres (3.37 sq mi) of land in the northwestern part of the taluk. It is located 11 kilometres (6.8 mi) northwest of Thiruvennainallur, the taluk headquarters, 20 kilometres (12 mi) west of Viluppuram, the district headquarters, and 150 kilometres (93 mi) southwest of the state capital of Chennai. The village is along State Highway 68, and is south of the Thenpennai River.

== Demographics ==
In 2011 Sithalingamadam had a population of 6,801 people living in 1,440 households. 3,448 (50.7%) of the inhabitants were male, while 3,353 (49.3%) were female. 852 children in the town, about 12.5% of the population, were at or below the age of 6. The literacy rate in the town was 62.7%, with the male rate of 69.8% being notably higher than the female rate of 55.6%. Scheduled Castes and Scheduled Tribes accounted for 22.9% and 1.44% of the population, respectively.
