= Veerapandi, Viluppuram =

Veerapandi
- Village
- Location in Tamil Nadu, India
- Coordinates: 12°02′47″N 79°12′58″E
- Country: India
- State: Tamil Nadu
- District: Viluppuram
- Taluk: Kandachipuram
- Revenue block: Mugaiyur

Area
  - Total: 10.9 km^{2} (4.2 sq mi)

Population (2021)
  - Total: 13,690
  - Density: 1,260/km^{2} (3,250/sq mi)

Languages
  - Official: Tamil
- Time zone: UTC+5:30 (IST)
- PIN: 605758
- Telephone code: 91-4153
- Vehicle registration: TN-32

Veerapandi is a revenue village in the Mugaiyur block and Kandachipuram taluk of Viluppuram district in the Indian state of Tamil Nadu.

== Geography ==
Veerapandi is within Kandachipuram taluk, which is in the southwestern part of Viluppuram district. It covers 10.9 square kilometres (4.2 sq mi) of land in the northwestern part of the taluk, near the border with Tiruvannamalai district. It is located 9 kilometres (5.6 mi) west of Kanchipuram, the taluk headquarters, 30 kilometres (19 mi) northwest of Viluppuram, the district headquarters, and 150 kilometres (93 mi) southwest of the state capital of Chennai. The village is within the drainage basin of the Thenpennai River.

== Demographics ==
In 2011 Veerapandi had a population of 7,690 people living in 1,588 households. 3,789 (49.3%) of the inhabitants were male, while 3,901 (50.7%) were female. 1,059 children in the town, about 13.8% of the population, were at or below the age of 6. 53.5% of the population was literate, with the male rate of 62.7% being notably higher than the female rate of 44.6%. Scheduled Castes and Scheduled Tribes accounted for 21.5% and 0.026% of the population, respectively.
