= Thirukoilur division =

Division In Tamil Nadu, India

Thirukoilur division is a revenue division in the Kallakurichi District of Tamil Nadu, India.
