= Vanavanmahadevi =

- village
- Country: India
- State: Tamil Nadu
- District: Nagapattinam

Languages
  - Official: Tamil
- Time zone: UTC+5:30 (IST)

Vanavanmahadevi is a village in the Nagapattinam district of the Indian state of Tamil Nadu. It has a population of 5,120 and the main activities are agriculture and fishing.

The name is derived from the name of King Raja Raja Chola I's mother. In her memory the renowned poet Kalamega Pulavar gave the name to this village.
