= Malayamān =

Chieftains who ruled Naadu Naadu

The Malaiyamān were chieftains who ruled Nadu Naadu, the area around Tirukkoyilur of Tamilakam, during the Sangam period. Chiefs of this dynasty readily took the title Chēdirāyan, and ruled the hill countries. This clan's most famous king was Malaiyamān Thirumudi Kaary. Their royal emblem featured a horse, depicted on their issued coins. Malaiyamans descended from Ayar tribe in the Mullai (forest) region.

It is of interest to note that Vanavan Mahadevi, the mother of Rajaraja Chola I, was a princess of Malaiyamān family.

== Malaiyaman coins ==
The Malaiyamans issued copper coins of quadrilateral shape which bore their royal emblem, a horse (sometimes facing left, and sometimes right). In some of the early coins, the legend "Malaiyaman" above the horse motif decorates the coin obverse. Most of their coins carried the symbolic map of their territory on the reverse: "A wide curved river with fishes flowing in it, and a hillock on side of the river". This depicted the territory over which they ruled. The Malaiyaman coins generally weighed from 2–4 g and were thin, unlike the contemporary Chera coins.

== See also ==
- Velir
