= Mugaiyur block =

Revenue block in Tamil Nadu state, India

The Mugaiyur block is a revenue block in the Viluppuram district of Tamil Nadu, India. It has a total of 63 panchayat villages.
