= Adaiyur, Tiruvannamalai =

Adaiyur Adaiyoor
- suburb
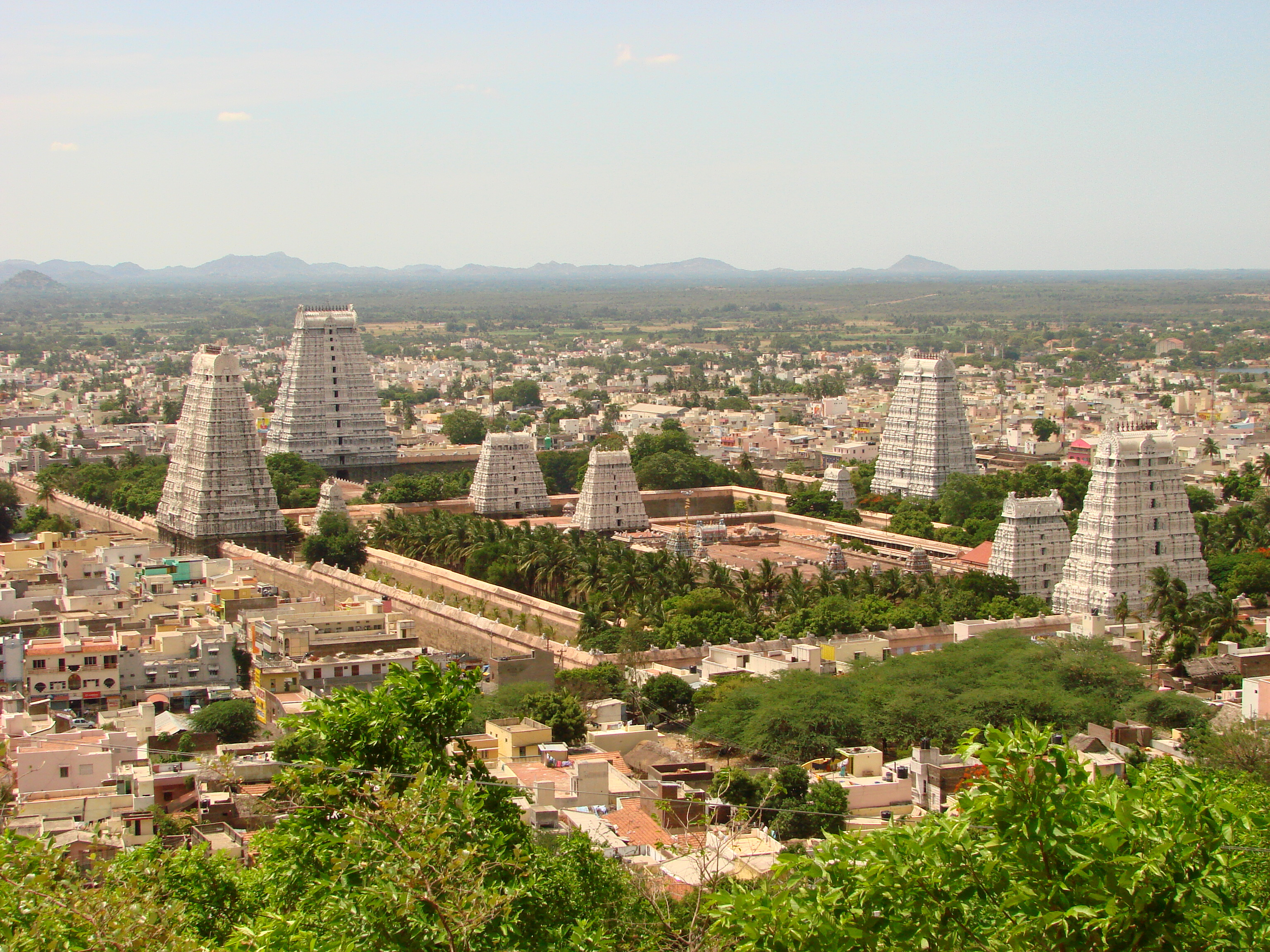
- Annamalaiyar temple at Thiruvannamalai

- Location in Tamil Nadu, India
- Coordinates: 12.20°N 79.05°E
- Country: India
- State: Tamil Nadu
- District: Tiruvannamalai
- Taluka: Tiruvannamalai taluk

Government
  - Municipal special mayor: Balachandran (ADMK)
- Elevation: 171 m (561 ft)

Population (2011)
  - Total: 19,560

Languages
  - Official: Tamil
- Time zone: UTC+5:30 (IST)
- PIN: 606 (605,606)
- Telephone code: 91-4175
- Vehicle registration: TN 25
- Sex ratio: 998 ♂/♀
- Lok Sabha constituency: Thiruvannamlai
- Vidhan Sabha constituency: Thiruvannamalai

Adaiyur is a suburb of the town of Thiruvannamalai, in the Indian state of Tamil Nadu. Administratively, it is a panchayat village of Tiruvannamalai taluk in Tiruvannamalai District. It is located on the Kanji road about 3 km northwest of downtown Thiruvannamalai. Panchayat President: M.Kalaivani munusamy from-(2020)

E. V. Velu of DMK is the MLA from Tiruvannamalai (state assembly constituency). Tiruvannamalai (Lok Sabha constituency) is the parliament constituency.

== Demographics ==
In 2011, its population was 19,560.
