= Viluppuram division =

Coordinates: 11.941°N 79.493°E

Viluppuram division is a revenue division in the Viluppuram district of Tamil Nadu, India.
