= Tirukkoyilur taluk =

Coordinates: 11.95°N 79.2°E

Tirukkoyilur taluk is a taluk of Kallakurichi district of the Indian state of Tamil Nadu. The headquarters of the taluk is the town of Tirukkoyilur.

== Demographics ==
According to the 2011 census, the taluk of Tirukkoyilur had a population of 438,254 with 222,295 males and 215,959 females. There were 971 women for every 1,000 men. The taluk had a literacy rate of 61.02%. Child population in the age group below 6 years were 27,019 Males and 25,166 Females.
