= List of highways numbered 134 =

The following highways are numbered 134:

== Australia ==
Anglesea Road

== Canada ==
- New Brunswick Route 134
- Ontario Highway 134 (former)
- Prince Edward Island Route 134
- Quebec Route 134

== Costa Rica ==
- National Route 134

== India ==
- National Highway 134 (India)
- State Highway 134 (Maharashtra)
- State Highway 134 (Tamil Nadu)

== Japan ==
- Japan National Route 134

== Mexico ==
- Mexican Federal Highway 134
  - Mexican Federal Highway 134D

== United Kingdom ==
- A134 road
- B134 road

== United States ==
- Alabama State Route 134
  - County Route 134 (Lee County, Alabama)
- Arkansas Highway 134
- California State Route 134
- Colorado State Highway 134
- Florida State Road 134
  - County Road 134 (Levy County, Florida)
- Georgia State Route 134 (former)
- Hawaii Route 134
- Illinois Route 134
- Indiana State Road 134
- Iowa Highway 134 (1935-1980) (former)
- K-134 (Kansas highway) (former)
- Kentucky Route 134
- Louisiana Highway 134
- Maine State Route 134
- Maryland Route 134
- Massachusetts Route 134
- M-134 (Michigan highway)
- Missouri Route 134
- Nebraska Highway 134 (former)
- County Route 134 (Bergen County, New Jersey)
- New Mexico State Road 134
- New York State Route 134
  - County Route 134A (Cortland County, New York)
    - County Route 134B (Cortland County, New York)
  - County Route 134 (Montgomery County, New York)
  - County Route 134 (Onondaga County, New York)
  - County Route 134 (Sullivan County, New York)
  - County Route 134 (Wayne County, New York)
- North Carolina Highway 134
- Ohio State Route 134
- Oklahoma State Highway 134 (former)
- Pennsylvania Route 134
- South Dakota Highway 134
- Tennessee State Route 134
- Texas State Highway 134 (former)
  - Texas State Highway Spur 134
  - Farm to Market Road 134
- Utah State Route 134
  - Utah State Route 134 (1933-1969) (former)
- Virginia State Route 134
  - Virginia State Route 134 (1930-1933) (former)
  - Virginia State Route 134 (1933-1942) (former)
- Wisconsin Highway 134
- Wyoming Highway 134

Territories

- Puerto Rico Highway 134

| Preceded by 133 | Lists of highways 134 | Succeeded by 135 |
