= Endiyur =

- village
- Location in Tamil Nadu, India Endiyur (India)
- Coordinates: 12°21′00″N 79°59′11″E
- Country: India
- State: Tamil Nadu
- District: Villupuram District

Population (2011)
  - Total: 3,103

Languages
  - Official: Tamil
- Time zone: UTC+5:30 (IST)
- PIN: 604001
- Vehicle registration: TN-16
- Nearest city: Pondicherry (about 32 km), Chennai (about 116 km)
- Sex ratio: 101 ♂/♀
- Literacy: 74.85 %
- Lok Sabha constituency: Villupuram
- State Assembly constituency: Tindivanam

Endiyur is a village panchayat located in Tindivanam, in the Villupuram district of Tamil-Nadu, India. The native language of the village is Tamil. The village is connected to nearby places through SH-134. The nearest railway station is Tindivanam which is 5 km from the village. Puducherry is 32.8 km from Endiyur. The village has a Draupadi Amman temple.

== Location ==
Endiyur village is located in Tindivanam Taluk, Villupuram District of Tamil-Nadu State, India.

Endiyur is located in the Tindivanam-Marakkanam Road. It is 5 kilometers distant from Tindivanam taluk town and 25 kilometers distant from Marakkanam, the village panchayat town. The village is 116 kilometers from Chennai, the capital of Tamil Nadu. It is 32.8 kilometers from Puducherry, the union territory. Endiyur is a village panchayat with a post office. The village is administrated by a Village Chairman who is elected through Panchayat Elections.

== Population ==
According to 2011 census, Endiyur has total population of 3103 of which 1556 are males and 1547 are females. Total of 773 families live in the village. Average Sex Ratio of Endiyur village is 994 which is lower than Tamil Nadu state average of 996. Endiyur village has lower literacy rate compared to Tamil Nadu. In 2011, literacy rate of Endiyur village was 74.85% compared to 80.09% of Tamil Nadu. In Endiyur, Male literacy rate stands at 85.92% while female literacy rate was 63.75%.

Particulars	Total	Male	Female
Houses	773	–	–
Population	3103	1556	1547
Literacy	74.85%	85.92%	63.75%

In Endiyur village, out of total population, 1536 are engaged in work activities. 77.21% of workers describe their work as Main Work (Employment or Earning more than 6 Months) while 22.79% are involved in Marginal activity providing livelihood for less than 6 months. Of 1536 workers engaged in Main Work, 526 are cultivators (owner or co-owner of lands) while 262 are Agricultural laborer.

== Climate & Tourism ==
=== Climate ===
Endiyur's climate is moderate, very similar to other parts of South India or Tamil Nadu. Summer is from April to August. Average temperature of summer is around 35 to 40 degree Celsius. Endiyur gets rainfall through North East Monsoon in the months of October, November and December. Average rainfall is around 15–20 cm in the monsoon season. The village does not get flooded with rainfall.

=== Tourism ===
Tourist sites near Endiyur include:

- Perumukkal Hills
- Gingee Fort
- Sathanur Dam
- Thiruvannamalai Annamalaiyar Temple

== Mode of Transport ==
Endiyur is connected through State Highway SH-134. Buses are available to neighboring villages.

The nearest railway station to the village is Tindivanam.

== Schools & Colleges ==
Literacy rate in Endiyur is 74.85% and many inhabitants of the village in this generation, go outside the village to do higher studies. Endiyur comes under Tindivanam education district.

=== Schools ===
Endiyur educates the inhabitants and surrounding villagers with its own Government Higher Secondary School (GHSS). This school has class from 1st standard to 12th standard (HSC). Mode of education in the school is only Tamil. Mode of education through English is available at different private schools in Tindivanam nearby. Some of the renowned private schools at which students from Endiyur study are

- St Ann's Higher Secondary School, Tindivanam
- St Philomena's Higher Secondary School, Tindivanam
- St Joseph of Cluny Matriculation Higher Secondary School, Erayanur
- Tagore Senior Secondary School, Tindivanam
- Montfort Higher Secondary School, Tindivanam

== Community, Occupation & Life Style ==
=== Community ===
The inhabitants of the village are Hindus and they belong to Vanniyar (Vanniya Goundar) community. Few families of Acharya community and only one Muslim family live in the village. There is no population of Scheduled Caste (SC) and Scheduled Tribe (ST) in the village.

== NGOs & Groups ==
=== Palmyra ===
Palmyra is a facilitating NGO located in Aurobrindavan, Auroville. It helps Endiyur with various projects such as canal construction from lakes to lands, toilet construction for houses in the village, formation of self-help groups, maintenance of lakes in the village for irrigation etc., Palmyra has finished a project of construction toilet and bathroom facilities in every house in the village in 2013 and around 250 people got sanitation facilities as a result of this project. Palmyra has also worked on drinking water treatment plant and installed a water treatment plant in the village in the year 2012.

=== Self Help Groups ===
Women in Endiyur have formed self-help groups (Tamil: Mahalir Sangam) from the year 2000 and they run those groups continuously. These groups help women in the village with empowerment. They collect small savings every month and lend the same money as loan to the needy in the group itself. Also these self-help groups deposit their savings in bank and get interest for their savings. Government provides subsidies for the self-help groups to get loans for special occasions
