= Utah State Route 135 (disambiguation) =

Utah State Route 135 may refer to:

- Utah State Route 135, a short divided state highway in northern Utah County
- Utah State Route 135 (1933-1969), Millard County
- Utah State Route 135 (1969-1992), Sevier County

== See also ==
- List of highways numbered 135
