= List of highways numbered 129 =

The following highways are numbered 129:

== Canada ==
- Ontario Highway 129
- Prince Edward Island Route 129

== Costa Rica ==
- National Route 129

== India ==
- National Highway 129 (India)

== Japan ==
- Japan National Route 129

== United Kingdom ==
- A129 road

== United States ==
- Interstate 129
- U.S. Route 129
- Alabama State Route 129
  - County Route 129 (Lee County, Alabama)
- Arkansas Highway 129
- California State Route 129
- Florida State Road 129
  - County Road 129 (Columbia County, Florida)
- Georgia State Route 129
- Illinois Route 129
- Indiana State Road 129
- K-129 (disambiguation) (former), two former highways
- Kentucky Route 129
- Louisiana Highway 129
- Maine State Route 129
- Maryland Route 129
- Massachusetts Route 129
  - Massachusetts Route 129A
- M-129 (Michigan highway)
- Missouri Route 129
- New Hampshire Route 129
- New Jersey Route 129
- New Mexico State Road 129
- New York State Route 129
  - County Route 129 (Jefferson County, New York)
  - County Route 129 (Monroe County, New York)
  - County Route 129 (Niagara County, New York)
  - County Route 129 (Seneca County, New York)
  - County Route 129 (Westchester County, New York)
- Ohio State Route 129
- Pennsylvania Route 129 (former)
- South Carolina Highway 129
- Tennessee State Route 129
- Texas State Highway 129 (former)
  - Texas State Highway Spur 129
  - Farm to Market Road 129
- Utah State Route 129 (disambiguation), several former highways and a current one
- Vermont Route 129
- Virginia State Route 129
  - Virginia State Route 129 (1928-1933) (former)
- Washington State Route 129
- West Virginia Route 129
- Wisconsin Highway 129

Territories

- Puerto Rico Highway 129

Preceded by 128	Lists of highways 129	Succeeded by 130
