= Timeline of the 2015 North Indian Ocean cyclone season =

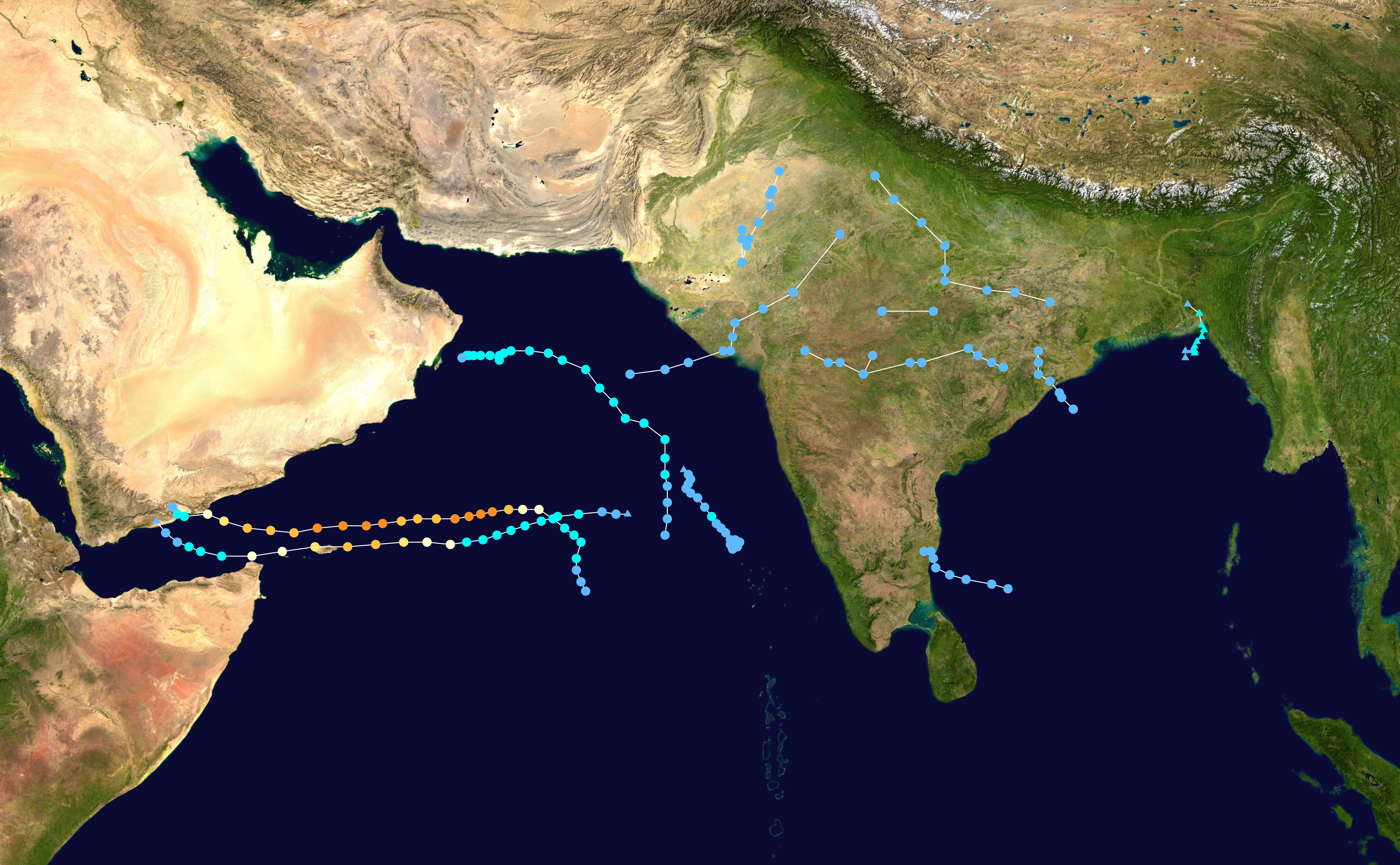
- Season summary map

Season boundaries
- First system formed: June 7, 2015
- Last system dissipated: November 10, 2015

Strongest system
- Name: Chapala
- Maximum winds: 215 km/h (130 mph) (3-minute sustained)
- Lowest pressure: 940 hPa (mbar)

Longest lasting system
- Name: Chapala
- Duration: 8 days
Storm articles
- Cyclone Komen
- Cyclone Chapala
- Cyclone Megh

The 2015 North Indian Ocean cyclone season was a below-average tropical cyclone season (Note: According to the India Meteorological Department, an average of five tropical cyclones of at least cyclonic storm intensity form in the North Indian Ocean annually; the 2015 season featured only four such storms.) which featured the highest number of deaths since the 2010 season. Despite inactivity in the Bay of Bengal caused by the ongoing El Niño, the season produced an above-average number of tropical cyclones in the Arabian Sea. The first storm of the season, Ashobaa, formed on 7 June, while the final storm of the season, Megh, ultimately dissipated on 10 November. A total of twelve depressions were recorded, of which nine intensified into deep depressions. Of these nine, a total of four further strengthened into cyclonic storms, while two attained their peaks as extremely severe cyclonic storms.

This timeline documents tropical cyclone formations, strengthening, weakening, landfalls, extratropical transitions, and dissipations during the season. The time stamp for each event is stated using Coordinated Universal Time (UTC), the 24-hour clock where 00:00 = midnight UTC. Additionally, figures for maximum sustained winds and position estimates are rounded to the nearest 5 units (Kilometres or miles). Direct wind observations are rounded to the nearest whole number. Meteorological observations typically report atmospheric pressures are measured in hectopascals per the recommendation of the World Meteorological Organization, and the nearest hundredth of an inches of mercury or millibars (hectopascals).

The India Meteorological Department (IMD) is the official Regional Specialized Meteorological Centre for the Northern Indian Ocean basin, and as such, it is responsible for tracking and issuing advisories on systems in the Arabian Sea and in the Bay of Bengal. If tropical cyclones in the Northern Indian Ocean reach winds of 34 kn (63 km/h; 39 mph), it is given a name from a pre-defined naming list. The Joint Typhoon Warning Center (JTWC) unofficially issues advisories on systems in the Northern Indian Ocean, assigning tropical cyclones a numerical identifier and suffixing it with the letter A for systems in the Arabian Sea and B for systems in the Bay of Bengal. The IMD measures tropical cyclone wind speeds over a 3-minute average while the JTWC uses a 1-minute average.

== Timeline of events ==
=== June ===
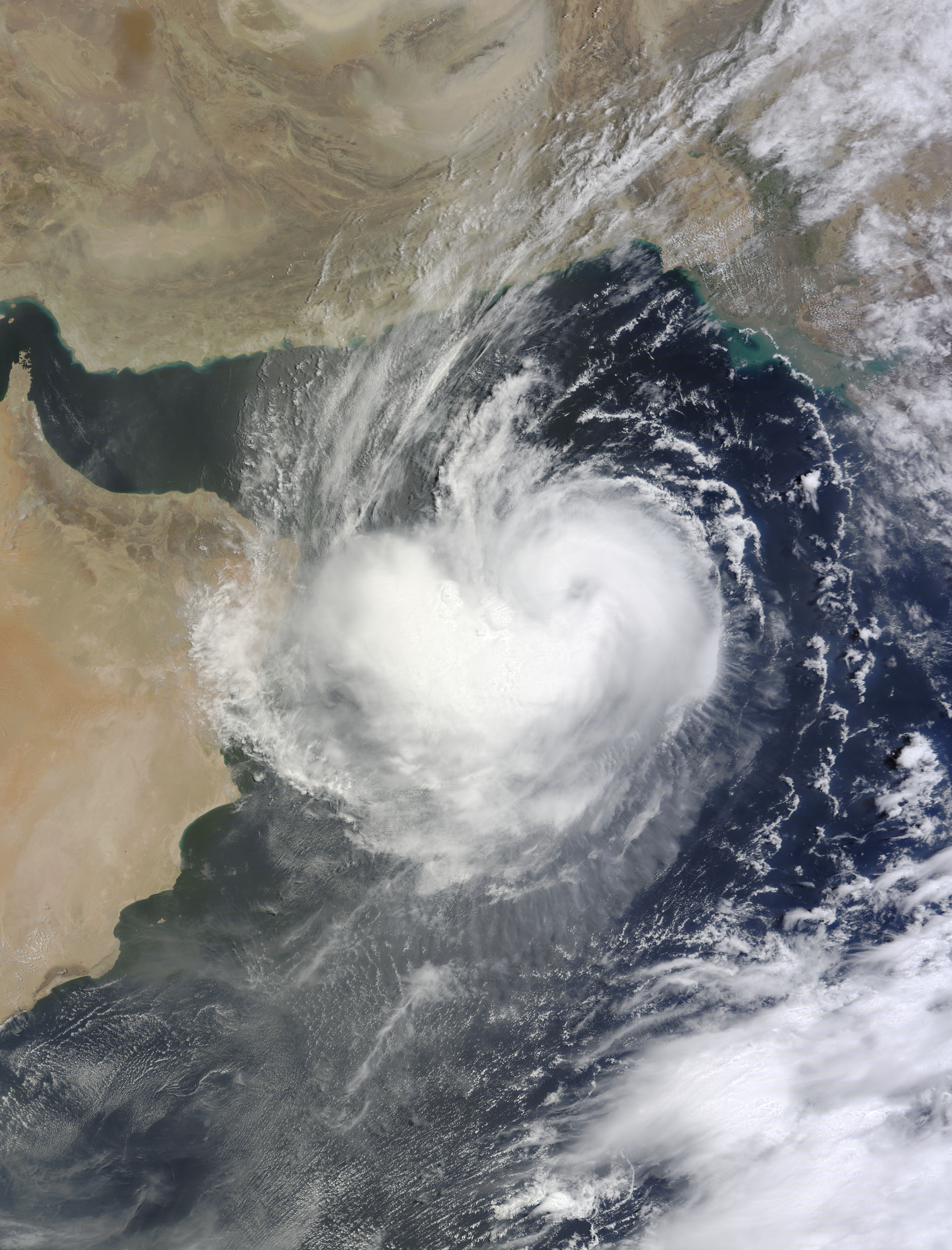
Cyclonic Storm Ashobaa (01A) over the Arabian Sea on 9 June

6 June

- 06:00 UTC (Note: UTC stands for Coordinated Universal Time.) (11:30 a.m. IST (Note: IST stands for Indian Standard Time, which is equivalent to UTC+5:30.)) at 13.1°N 68.5°E – The Joint Typhoon Warning Center (JTWC) reports that Tropical Depression 01A has formed from an area of low pressure while located roughly 475 km (295 mi) (Note: The figures for maximum sustained winds and position estimates are rounded to the nearest 5 units (knots, miles, or kilometers), following the convention used in the India Meteorological Department and Joint Typhoon Warning Center's operational products for each storm. All other units are rounded to the nearest digit.) northwest of Lakshadweep, India.

7 June

- 03:00 UTC (8:30 a.m. IST) at 14.5°N 68.5°E – The India Meteorological Department (IMD) designates Tropical Depression 01A as Depression ARB 01 while the system is located roughly 580 km (360 mi) west of Goa.
- 06:00 UTC (11:30 a.m. IST) at 15.7°N 68.5°E – The JTWC reports that Tropical Depression ARB 01 (01A) has intensified into a tropical storm while located roughly 575 km (355 mi) west of Goa.

8 June

- 00:00 UTC (5:30 a.m. IST) at 17.5°N 67.5°E – The IMD reports that Depression ARB 01 (01A) has intensified into a deep depression while located roughly 510 km (315 mi) west of Porbandar, Gujarat.
- 03:00 UTC (8:30 a.m. IST) at 17.9°N 67.2°E – The IMD reports that Deep Depression ARB 01 (01A) has intensified into a cyclonic storm and names it "Ashobaa" while the system is located roughly 490 km (305 mi) west of Porbandar, Gujarat.

9 June

- 18:00 UTC (11:30 p.m. IST) at 21.2°N 62.5°E – The IMD reports that Cyclonic Storm Ashobaa (01A) has reached its peak intensity, with maximum 3-minute sustained wind speeds of 85 km/h (55 mph), while located roughly 510 km (315 mi) southeast of Muscat, Oman.
- 18:00 UTC (11:30 p.m. IST) at 21.0°N 62.7°E – The JTWC reports that Tropical Storm Ashobaa (01A) has reached its peak intensity, with maximum 1-minute sustained wind speeds of 105 km/h (65 mph), while located roughly 540 km (335 mi) southeast of Muscat, Oman.

11 June

- 18:00 UTC (11:30 p.m. IST) at 20.8°N 59.7°E – The IMD reports that Cyclonic Storm Ashobaa (01A) has weakened into a deep depression while located roughly 340 km (210 mi) southeast of Muscat, Oman.

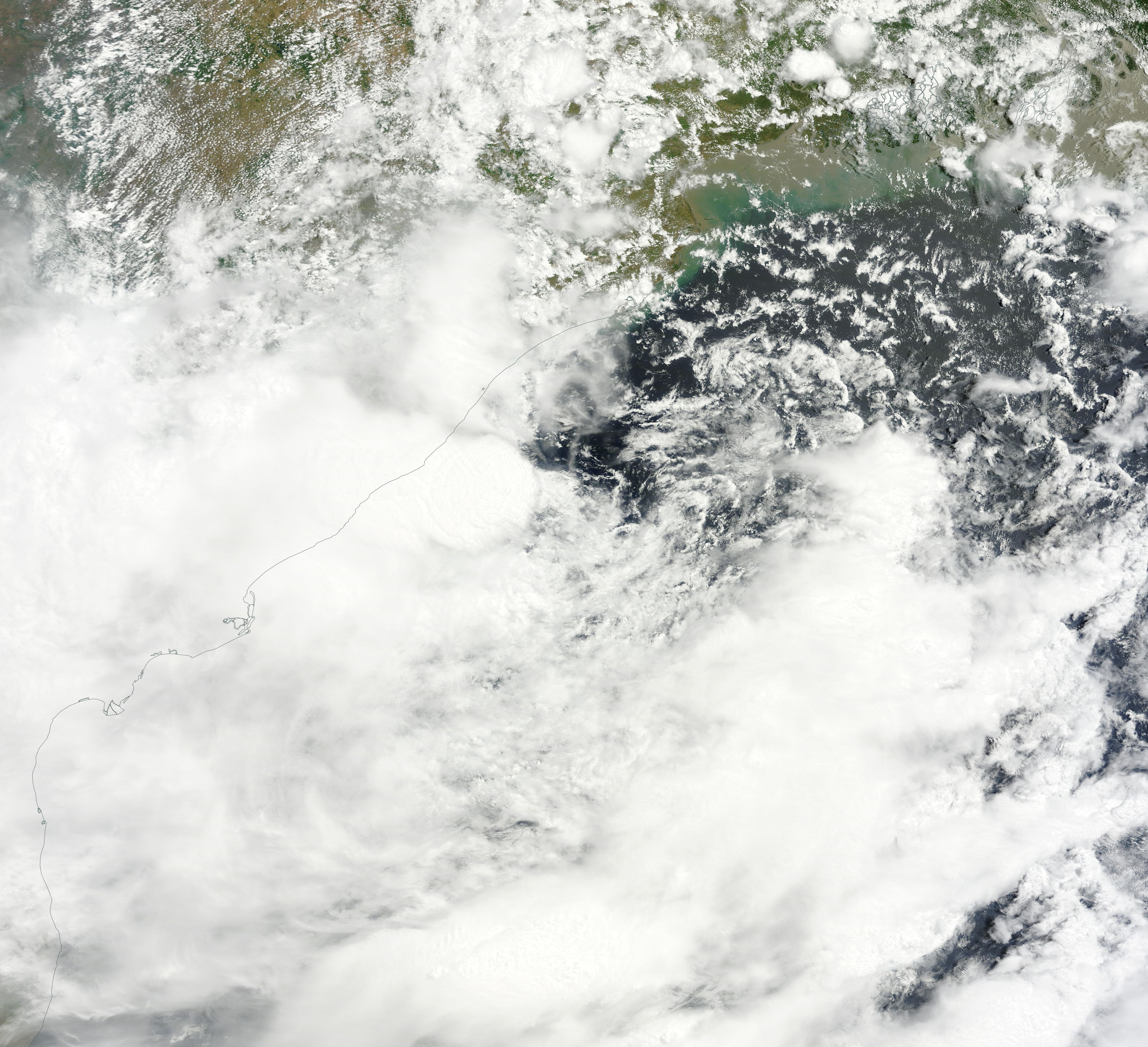
Depression BOB 01 while making landfall on the Odia coast late on 20 June

12 June

- 00:00 UTC (5:30 a.m. IST) at 20.8°N 59.5°E – The IMD reports that Deep Depression ex-Ashobaa (01A) has weakened into a depression while located roughly 335 km (210 mi) southeast of Muscat, Oman.
- 06:00 UTC (11:30 a.m. IST) at 20.7°N 59.8°E – The JTWC reports that Tropical Storm Ashobaa (01A) has weakened into a tropical depression and dissipated while located roughly 355 km (220 mi) southeast of Muscat, Oman.
- 12:00 UTC (5:30 p.m. IST) at 20.8°N 59.5°E – The IMD reports that Depression ex-Ashobaa (01A) has weakened into a well-marked low-pressure area while located roughly 335 km (210 mi) southeast of Muscat, Oman.

20 June

- 03:00 UTC (8:30 a.m. IST) at 18.0°N 86.0°E – The IMD reports that Depression BOB 01 has formed while located roughly 250 km (155 mi) south of Bhubaneswar, Odisha. Simultaneously, they report that the system has reached its peak intensity, with maximum 3-minute sustained wind speeds of 45 km/h (30 mph).
- 20:00–21:00 UTC (1:30–2:30 a.m. IST, 21 June) at 19.7°N 85.0°E – The IMD reports that Depression BOB 01 has made landfall on the Odia coast between Gopalpur and Puri with maximum 3-minute sustained wind speeds of 45 km/h (30 mph).

22 June

- 00:00 UTC (5:30 a.m. IST) at 21.0°N 84.5°E – The IMD reports that Depression BOB 01 has weakened into a well-marked low-pressure area while located over the Indian states of Odisha, Jharkhand and Chhattisgarh.
- 03:00 UTC (8:30 a.m. IST) at 20.0°N 67.0°E – The IMD reports that Depression ARB 02 has formed while located roughly 330 km (205 mi) southwest of Porbandar, Gujarat.

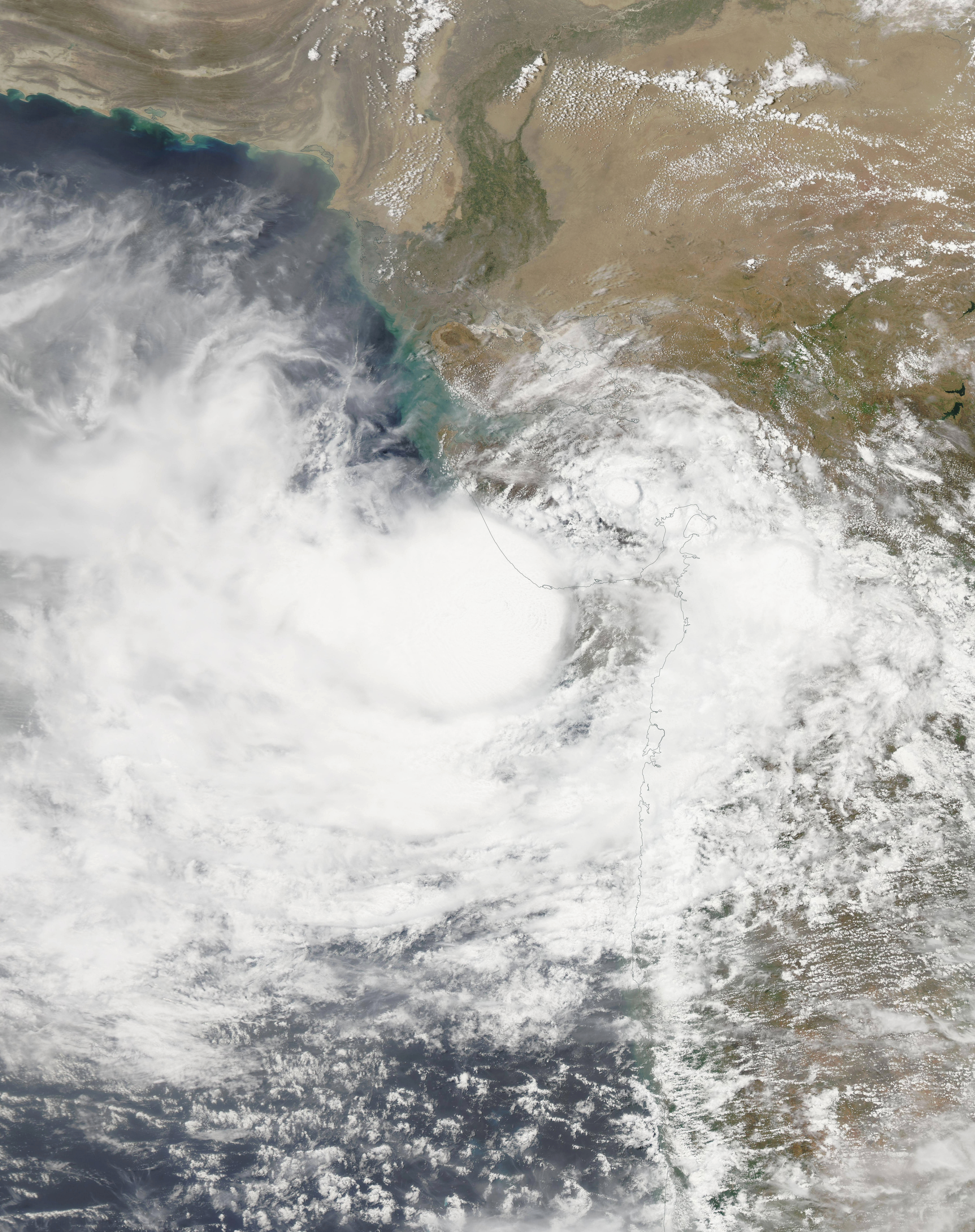
Deep Depression ARB 02 shortly before making landfall near Diu on 23 June

23 June

- 03:00 UTC (8:30 a.m. IST) at 20.5°N 70.5°E – The IMD reports that Depression ARB 02 has intensified into a deep depression while located roughly 50 km (30 mi) southwest of Diu, Daman and Diu. Simultaneously, they report that the system has reached its peak intensity, with maximum 3-minute sustained wind speeds of 55 km/h (35 mph).
- 09:00–10:00 UTC (2:30–3:30 p.m. IST) at 21.0°N 71.3°E – The IMD reports that Deep Depression ARB 02 has made landfall near Diu with maximum 3-minute sustained wind speeds of 55 km/h (35 mph).

24 June

- 12:00 UTC (5:30 p.m. IST) at 23.5°N 74.0°E – The IMD reports that Deep Depression ARB 02 has weakened into a depression while located roughly 125 km (80 mi) south of Udaipur, Rajasthan.

25 June

- 00:00 UTC (5:30 a.m. IST) at 26.0°N 76.0°E – The IMD reports that Depression ARB 02 has weakened into a well-marked low-pressure area while located over northwestern Madhya Pradesh.

=== July ===
10 July

- 03:00 UTC (8:30 a.m. IST) at 23.1°N 85.1°E – The IMD reports that Depression LAND 01 has formed while located over Jharkhand. Simultaneously, they report that the system has reached its peak intensity, with maximum 3-minute sustained wind speeds of 45 km/h (30 mph).

12 July

- 12:00 UTC (5:30 p.m. IST) at 28.5°N 77.3°E – The IMD reports that Depression LAND 01 has weakened into a well-marked low-pressure area while located over northwestern Uttar Pradesh and neighboring Haryana.

26 July

- 00:00 UTC (5:30 a.m. IST) at 22.0°N 90.8°E – The IMD reports that Depression BOB 02 has formed while located roughly 110 km (70 mi) west of Chittagong, Bangladesh.

27 July

- 12:00 UTC (5:30 p.m. IST) at 26.2°N 71.8°E – The IMD reports that Depression LAND 02 has formed while located over southwestern Rajasthan and neighboring Gujarat.

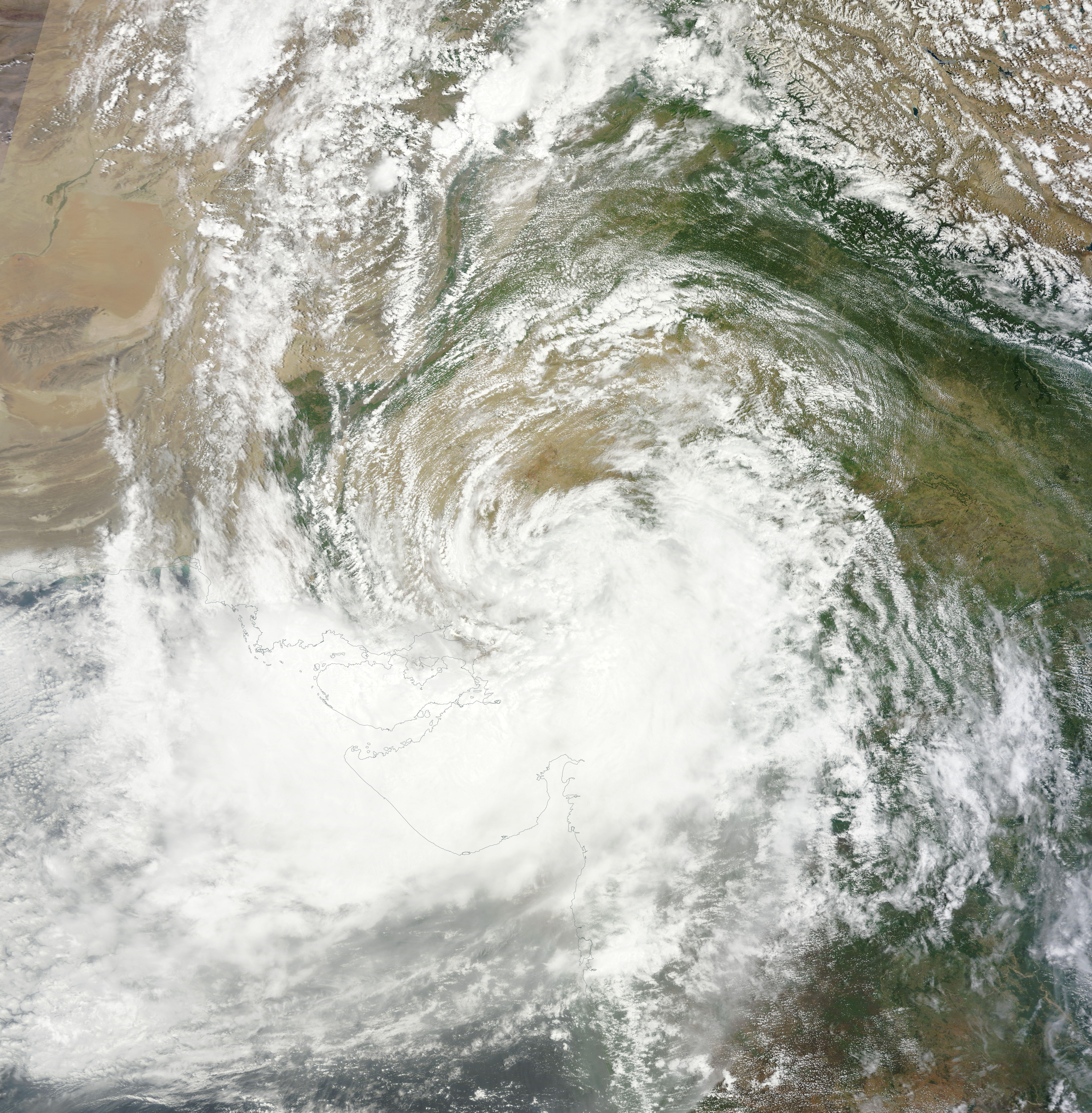
Depression LAND 02 over Rajasthan on 28 July

28 July

- 03:00 UTC (8:30 a.m. IST) at 24.8°N 71.8°E – The IMD reports that Depression LAND 02 has intensified into a deep depression while located roughly 205 km (125 mi) southwest of Jodhpur, Rajasthan. Simultaneously, they report that the system has reached its peak intensity, with maximum 3-minute sustained wind speeds of 55 km/h (35 mph).
- 06:00 UTC (11:30 a.m. IST) at 20.7°N 90.8°E – The JTWC designates Depression BOB 02 as Tropical Depression 02B while the system is located roughly 145 km (90 mi) southwest of Cox's Bazar, Bangladesh.

29 July

- 00:00 UTC (5:30 a.m. IST) at 21.0°N 91.0°E – The IMD reports that Depression BOB 02 (02B) has intensified into a deep depression while located roughly 110 km (70 mi) southwest of Cox's Bazar, Bangladesh.
- 00:00 UTC (5:30 a.m. IST) at 21.0°N 91.2°E – The JTWC reports that Tropical Depression BOB 02 (02B) has intensified into a tropical storm while located roughly 95 km (60 mi) southwest of Cox's Bazar, Bangladesh.
- 00:00 UTC (5:30 a.m. IST) at 26.5°N 72.5°E – The IMD reports that Deep Depression LAND 02 has weakened into a depression while located roughly 60 km (35 mi) northwest of Jodhpur, Rajasthan.
- 18:00 UTC (11:30 p.m. IST) at 21.6°N 91.4°E – The IMD reports that Deep Depression BOB 02 (02B) has intensified into a cyclonic storm and names it "Komen" while the system is located roughly 60 km (35 mi) west of Cox's Bazar, Bangladesh.

30 July

- 00:00 UTC (5:30 a.m. IST) at 21.6°N 91.5°E – The JTWC reports that Tropical Storm Komen (02B) has reached its peak intensity, with maximum 1-minute sustained wind speeds of 75 km/h (45 mph) while located roughly 50 km (30 mi) west of Cox's Bazar, Bangladesh.
- 03:00 UTC (8:30 a.m. IST) at 28.7°N 73.4°E – The IMD reports that Depression LAND 02 has weakened into a well-marked area of low pressure while located over western Rajasthan.
- 06:00 UTC (11:30 a.m. IST) at 22.2°N 91.4°E – The IMD reports that Cyclonic Storm Komen (02B) has reached its peak intensity, with maximum 3-minute sustained wind speeds of 75 km/h (45 mph).
- 14:00–15:00 UTC (7:30–8:30 p.m. IST) at 22.4°N 91.4°E – The IMD reports that Cyclonic Storm Komen (02B) has made landfall with maximum 3-minute sustained wind speeds of 65 km/h (40 mph) while located roughly 45 km (30 mi) west of Chittagong, Bangladesh.
- 21:00 UTC (2:30 a.m. IST, 31 July) at 23.0°N 91.0°E – The IMD reports that Cyclonic Storm Komen (02B) has weakened into a deep depression while located roughly 40 km (25 mi) south of Agartala, Tripura.

31 July

- 00:00 UTC (5:30 a.m. IST) at 23.0°N 90.9°E – The JTWC reports that Tropical Storm Komen (02B) has weakened into a tropical depression and dissipated while located roughly 105 km (65 mi) south of Agartala, Tripura.
- 12:00 UTC (5:30 p.m. IST) at 23.1°N 89.5°E – The IMD reports that Deep Depression ex-Komen (02B) has weakened into a depression while located roughly 125 km (80 mi) southwest of Dhaka, Bangladesh.

=== August ===
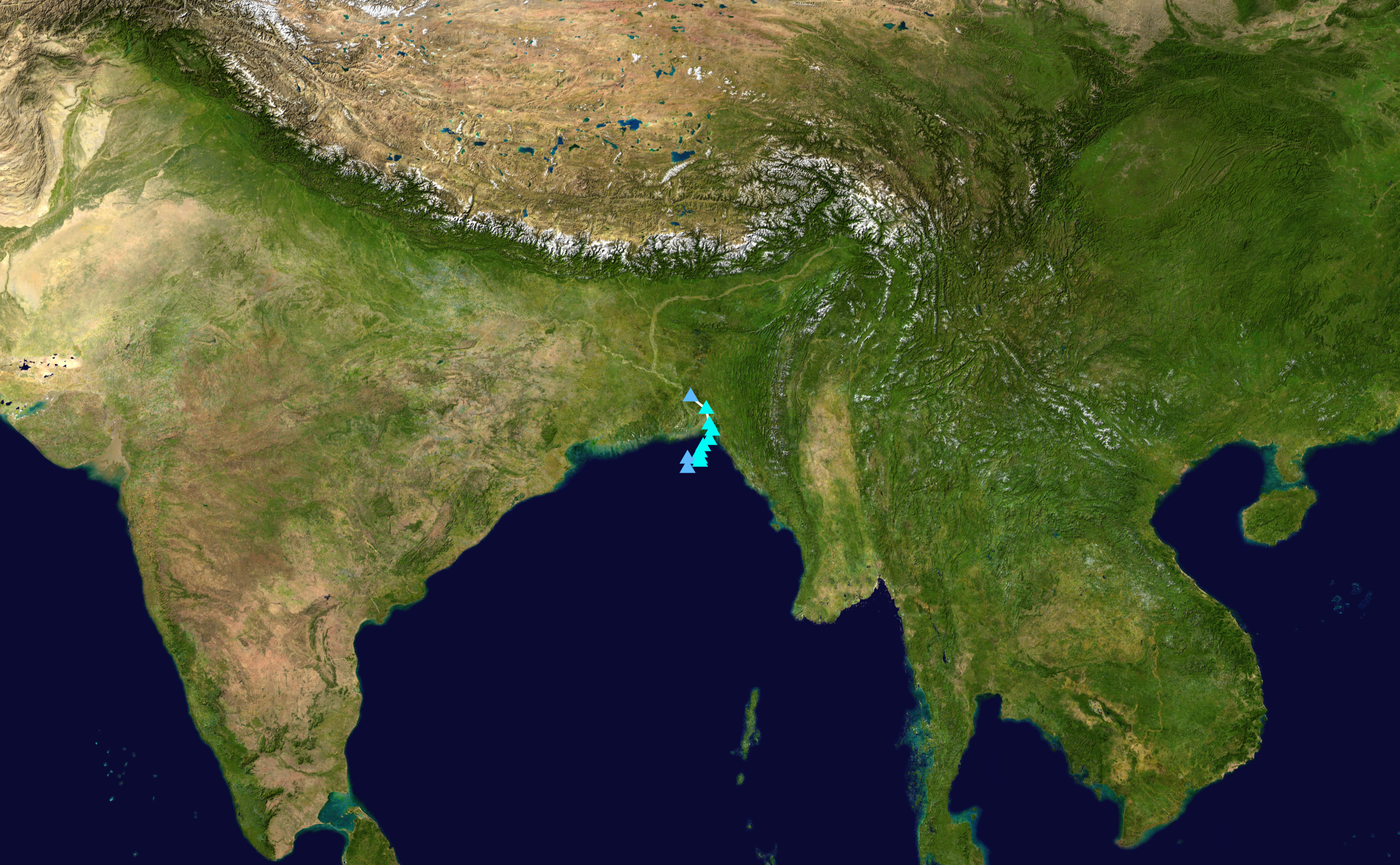
Storm path of Cyclonic Storm Komen (02B) during late July and early August

2 August

- 12:00 UTC (5:30 p.m. IST) at 23.1°N 85.5°E – The IMD reports that Depression ex-Komen (02B) has weakened into a well-marked area of low pressure over Jharkhand and northern Odisha and Chhattisgarh.

4 August

- 03:00 UTC (8:30 a.m. IST) at 22.7°N 80.5°E – The IMD reports that Depression LAND 03 has formed while located over eastern Madhya Pradesh and neighboring Chhattisgarh. Simultaneously, they report that the system has attained its peak intensity, with maximum 3-minute sustained wind speeds of 45 km/h (30 mph).

5 August

- 00:00 UTC (5:30 a.m. IST) at 22.7°N 77.8°E – The IMD reports that Depression LAND 03 has weakened into a well-marked low-pressure area while located over southwestern Madhya Pradesh.

=== September ===
16 September

- 03:00 UTC (8:30 a.m. IST) at 19.6°N 83.5°E – The IMD reports that Depression LAND 04 has formed from an area of low pressure while located over southern Odisha.

17 September

- 03:00 UTC (8:30 a.m. IST) at 21.0°N 79.5°E – The IMD reports that Depression LAND 04 has intensified into a deep depression while located roughly 50 km (30 mi) east of Nagpur, Maharashtra. Simultaneously, they report that the system has reached its peak intensity with maximum 3-minute sustained wind speeds of 55 km/h (35 mph).

18 September

- 03:00 UTC (8:30 a.m. IST) at 20.7°N 77.0°E – The IMD reports that Deep Depression LAND 04 has weakened into a depression while located roughly 190 km (120 mi) northeast of Aurangabad, Maharashtra.

19 September

- 03:00 UTC (8:30 a.m. IST) at 21.0°N 74.5°E – The IMD reports that Depression LAND 04 has weakened into a well-marked area of low pressure while located over northern Maharashtra and neighboring areas of southwestern Madhya Pradesh and Gujarat.

=== October ===
7 October

- 00:00 UTC (5:30 a.m. IST) at 12.7°N 71.3°E – The JTWC reports that Tropical Depression 03A has formed from an area of low pressure while located roughly 230 km (145 mi) northwest of Lakshadweep, India.

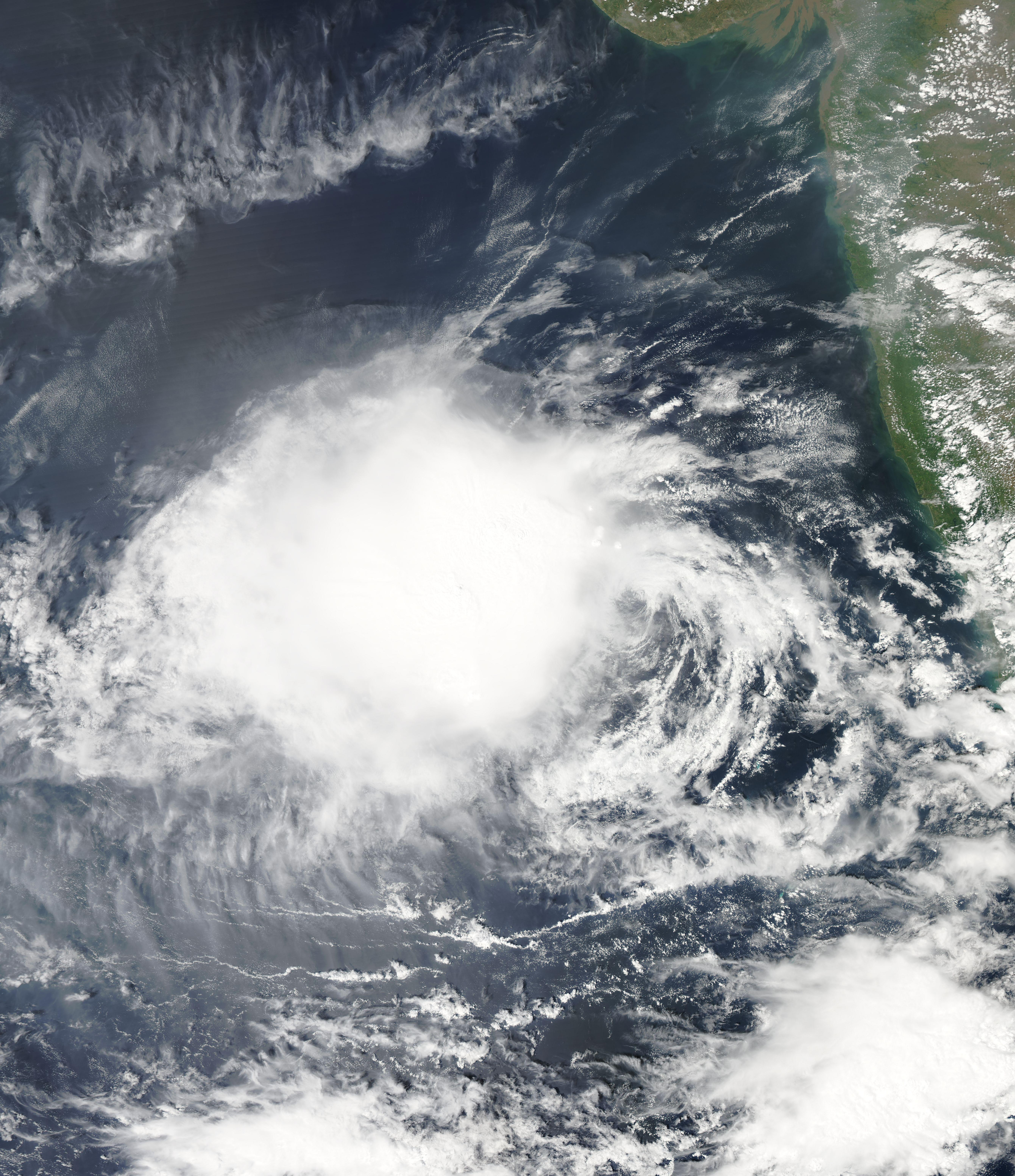
Depression ARB 03 (03A) over the Arabian Sea on 9 October

9 October

- 00:00 UTC (5:30 a.m. IST) at 14.0°N 70.3°E – The IMD designates Tropical Depression 03A as Depression ARB 03 while the system is located roughly 410 km (255 mi) west of Goa.
- 06:00 UTC (11:30 a.m. IST) at 13.9°N 70.5°E – The JTWC reports that Tropical Depression ARB 03 (03A) has intensified into a tropical storm while located roughly 385 km (240 mi) northwest of Lakshadweep, India. Simultaneously, they report that the storm has reached its peak intensity, with maximum 1-minute sustained wind speeds of 65 km/h (40 mph).
- 12:00 UTC (5:30 p.m. IST) at 14.3°N 70.2°E – The JTWC reports that Tropical Storm ARB 03 (03A) has weakened into a tropical depression while located roughly 410 km (255 mi) west of Goa.
- 18:00 UTC (11:30 p.m. IST) at 14.7°N 69.9°E – The IMD reports that Depression ARB 03 (03A) has intensified into a deep depression while located roughly 430 km (265 mi) west of Goa. Simultaneously, they report that the system has reached its peak intensity, with maximum 3-minute sustained wind speeds of 55 km/h (35 mph).

11 October

- 00:00 UTC (5:30 a.m. IST) at 15.6°N 69.2°E – The IMD reports that Deep Depression ARB 03 (03A) has weakened into a depression while located roughly 500 km (310 mi) west of Goa.

12 October

- 03:00 UTC (8:30 a.m. IST) at 16.1°N 69.0°E – The IMD reports that Depression ARB 03 (03A) has weakened into a well-marked area of low pressure while located roughly 525 km (325 mi) west of Goa.
- 06:00 UTC (11:30 a.m. IST) at 15.9°N 69.3°E – The JTWC reports that Tropical Depression ARB 03 (03A) has weakened into an area of low pressure and dissipated while located roughly 490 km (305 mi) west of Goa.

27 October

- 12:00 UTC (5:30 p.m. IST) at 10.7°N 65.1°E – The JTWC reports that Tropical Depression 04A has formed from an area of low pressure while located roughly 775 km (480 mi) west of Lakshadweep, India.

28 October

- 03:00 UTC (8:30 a.m. IST) at 11.5°N 65.0°E – The IMD designates Tropical Depression 04A as Depression ARB 04 while the system is located roughly 790 km (490 mi) west of Lakshadweep, India.
- 06:00 UTC (11:30 a.m. IST) at 12.1°N 64.7°E – The JTWC reports that Tropical Depression ARB 04 (04A) has intensified into a tropical storm while located roughly 830 km (515 mi) west of Lakshadweep, India.
- 12:00 UTC (5:30 p.m. IST) at 12.5°N 64.7°E – The IMD reports that Depression ARB 04 (04A) has intensified into a deep depression while located roughly 835 km (520 mi) west of Lakshadweep, India.

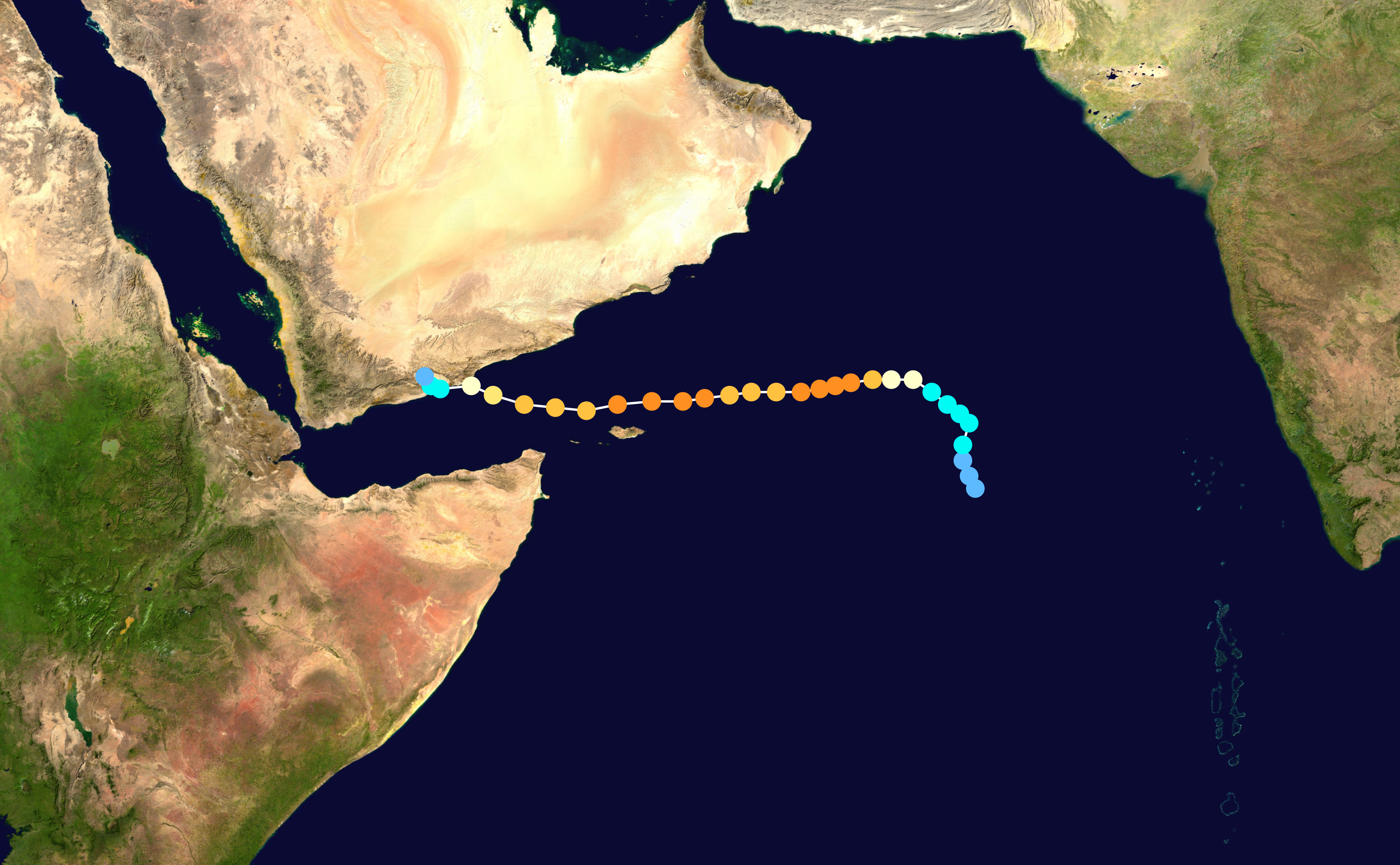
Storm path of Extremely Severe Cyclonic Storm Chapala (04A) during late October and early November

29 October

- 00:00 UTC (5:30 a.m. IST) at 13.7°N 64.3°E – The IMD reports that Deep Depression ARB 04 (04A) has intensified into a cyclonic storm and names it "Chapala" while the system is located roughly 915 km (570 mi) west of Lakshadweep, India.
- 09:00 UTC (2:30 p.m. IST) at 14.0°N 63.5°E – The IMD reports that Cyclonic Storm Chapala (04A) has intensified into a severe cyclonic storm while located roughly 870 km (540 mi) southeast of Duqm, Oman.
- 12:00 UTC (5:30 p.m. IST) at 14.2°N 63.1°E – The JTWC reports that Tropical Storm Chapala (04A) has intensified into a category 1 tropical cyclone while located roughly 780 km (485 mi) southeast of Duqm, Oman.
- 18:00 UTC (11:30 UTC) at 14.3°N 62.5°E – The IMD reports that Severe Cyclonic Storm Chapala (04A) has intensified into a very severe cyclonic storm while located roughly 775 km (480 mi) southeast of Duqm, Oman.

30 October

- 00:00 UTC (5:30 a.m. IST) at 14.3°N 61.8°E – The IMD reports that Very Severe Cyclonic Storm Chapala (04A) has intensified into an extremely severe cyclonic storm while located roughly 730 km (455 mi) southeast of Duqm, Oman.
- 00:00 UTC (5:30 a.m. IST) at 14.2°N 61.8°E – The JTWC reports that Tropical Cyclone Chapala (04A) has intensified into a category 3 tropical cyclone while located roughly 735 km (455 mi) southeast of Duqm, Oman.
- 06:00 UTC (11:30 a.m. IST) at 14.1°N 61.1°E – The JTWC reports that Tropical Cyclone Chapala (04A) has intensified into a category 4 tropical cyclone while located roughly 695 km (430 mi) southeast of Duqm, Oman. Simultaneously, they report that the system has reached its peak intensity, with maximum 1-minute sustained wind speeds of 240 km/h (150 mph).
- 09:00 UTC (2:30 p.m. IST) at 14.2°N 60.8°E – The IMD reports that Extremely Severe Cyclonic Storm Chapala (04A) has reached its peak intensity, with maximum 3-minute sustained wind speeds of 210 km/h (130 mph), while located roughly 675 km (420 mi) southeast of Duqm, Oman.

31 October

- 06:00 UTC (11:30 a.m. IST) at 13.8°N 58.7°E – The JTWC reports that Tropical Cyclone Chapala (04A) has weakened into a category 3 tropical cyclone while located roughly 535 km (330 mi) east of the Yemeni island of Socotra.

=== November ===
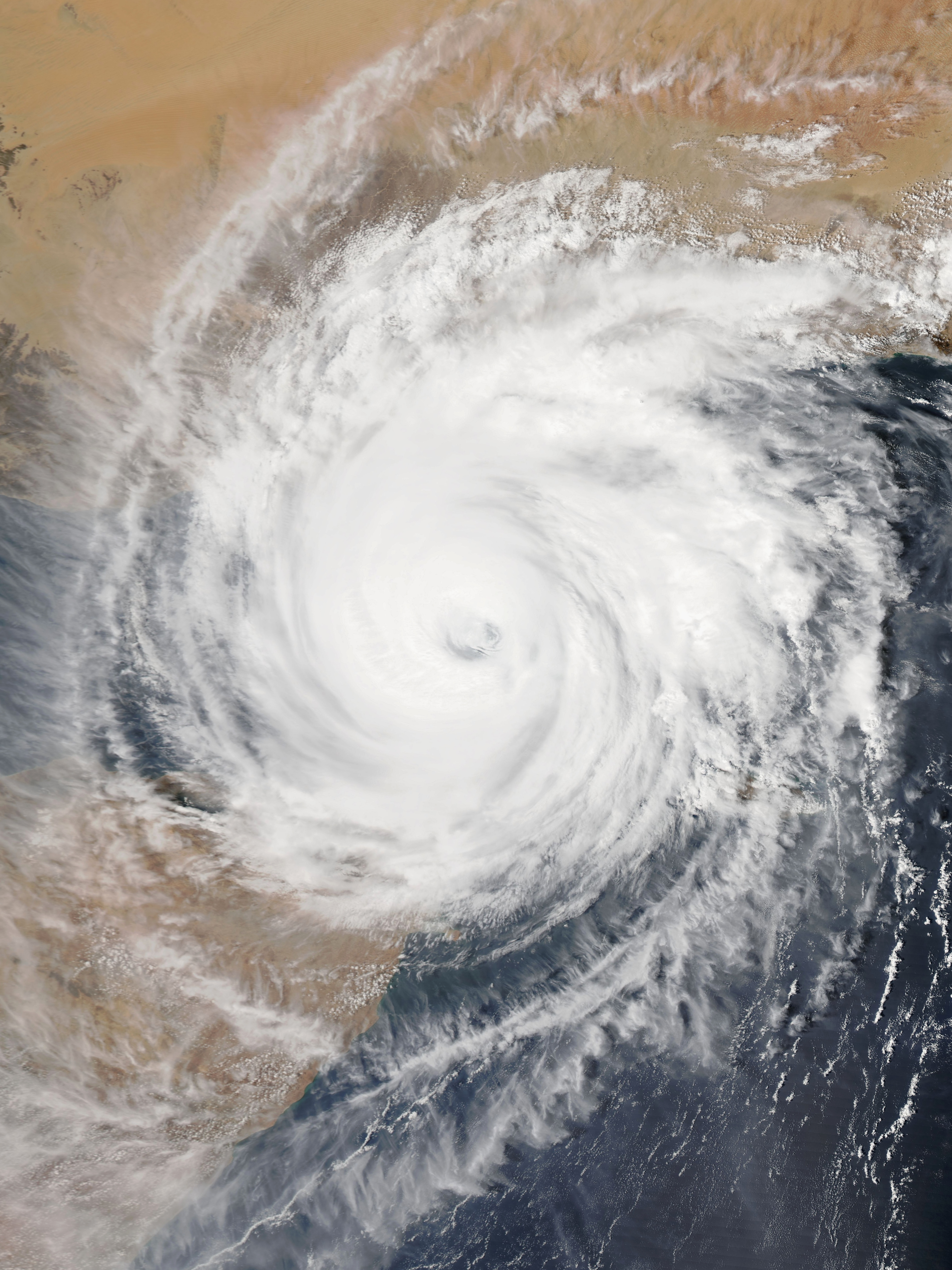
Extremely Severe Cyclonic Storm Chapala (04A) approaching Yemen on 2 November

1 November

- 00:00 UTC (5:30 a.m. IST) at 13.6°N 56.4°E – The JTWC reports that Tropical Cyclone Chapala (04A) has re-intensified into a category 4 tropical cyclone while located roughly 290 km (180 mi) east of Socotra.
- 18:00 UTC (11:30 p.m. IST) at 13.4°N 53.7°E – The IMD reports that Extremely Severe Cyclonic Storm Chapala (04A) has made its closest approach to Socotra, passing 90 km (55 mi) north of the island with maximum 3-minute sustained wind speeds of 185 km/h (115 mph). This makes Chapala the first storm to produce hurricane-force winds on the island since 1922.

2 November

- 00:00 UTC (5:30 a.m. IST) at 13.2°N 52.6°E – The JTWC reports that Tropical Cyclone Chapala (04A) has weakened into a category 3 tropical cyclone while located roughly 155 km (95 mi) northeast of Socotra.
- 12:00 UTC (5:30 p.m. IST) at 13.4°N 50.5°E – The IMD reports that Extremely Severe Cyclonic Storm Chapala (04A) has weakened into a very severe cyclonic storm while located roughly 160 km (100 mi) north of Alula, Somalia.
- 18:00 UTC (11:30 p.m. IST) at 13.7°N 49.6°E – The JTWC reports that Tropical Cyclone Chapala (04A) has weakened into a category 2 tropical cyclone while located roughly 110 km (70 mi) south of Mukalla, Yemen.

3 November

- 00:00 UTC (5:30 a.m. IST) at 14.0°N 48.9°E – The JTWC reports that Tropical Cyclone Chapala (04A) has weakened into a category 1 tropical cyclone while located roughly 85 km (55 mi) southwest of Mukalla, Yemen.
- 01:00–02:00 UTC (6:30–7:30 a.m. IST) at 14.1°N 48.7°E – The IMD reports that Very Severe Cyclonic Storm Chapala (04A) has made landfall to the southwest of Mukalla, Yemen with maximum 3-minute sustained wind speeds of 120 km/h (75 mph). This makes Chapala the first storm in recorded history to make landfall with hurricane-force winds on the Yemeni mainland.
- 03:00 UTC (8:30 a.m. IST) at 14.2°N 48.4°E – The IMD reports that Very Severe Cyclonic Storm Chapala (04A) has weakened into a severe cyclonic storm while located roughly 110 km (70 mi) southwest of Mukalla, Yemen.
- 03:00 UTC (8:30 a.m. IST) at 14.0°N 48.4°E – The JTWC reports that Tropical Cyclone Chapala (04A) has weakened into a tropical storm while located roughly 120 km (75 mi) southwest of Mukalla, Yemen.
- 06:00 UTC (11:30 a.m. IST) at 14.2°N 47.8°E – The IMD reports that Severe Cyclonic Storm Chapala (04A) has weakened into a cyclonic storm while located roughly 170 km (105 mi) west of Mukalla, Yemen.
- 18:00 UTC (11:30 p.m. IST) at 14.3°N 47.0°E – The IMD reports that Cyclonic Storm Chapala (04A) has weakened into a deep depression while located roughly 35 km (20 mi) southeast of Ataq, Yemen.
- 18:00 UTC (11:30 p.m. IST) at 14.3°N 47.4°E – The JTWC reports that Tropical Storm Chapala (04A) has weakened into a tropical depression and dissipated while located roughly 70 km (45 mi) southeast of Ataq, Yemen.

4 November

- 00:00 UTC (5:30 a.m. IST) at 14.8°N 46.5°E – The IMD reports that Deep Depression ex-Chapala (04A) has weakened into a depression while located roughly 45 km (30 mi) northwest of Ataq, Yemen.
- 03:00 UTC (8:30 a.m. IST) at 14.8°N 46.5°E – The IMD reports that Depression ex-Chapala (04A) has weakened into a well-marked area of low pressure while located over Yemen.
- 18:00 UTC (11:30 p.m. IST) at 14.0°N 66.4°E – The JTWC reports that Tropical Depression 05A has formed from an area of low pressure while located roughly 720 km (445 mi) northwest of Lakshadweep, India.

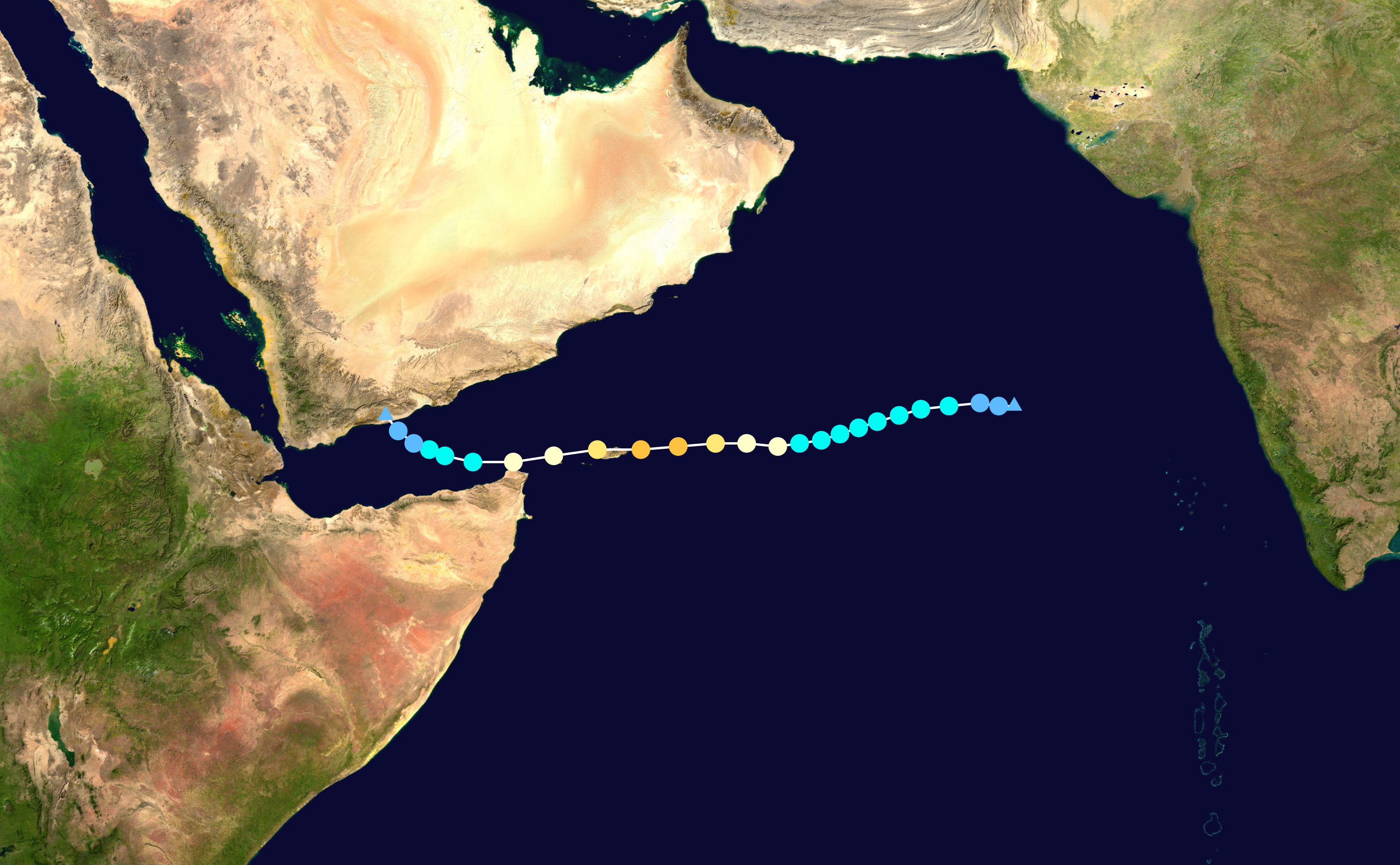
Storm path of Extremely Severe Cyclonic Storm Megh (05A) during early November

5 November

- 00:00 UTC at 14.1°N 66.0°E – The IMD designates Tropical Depression 05A as Depression ARB 05 while the system is located roughly 765 km (475 mi) northwest of Lakshadweep, India.
- 06:00 UTC at 14.1°N 64.8°E – The IMD reports that Depression ARB 05 (05A) has intensified into a deep depression while located roughly 880 km (545 mi) northwest of Lakshadweep, India.
- 06:00 UTC at 14.0°N 64.8°E – The JTWC reports that Tropical Depression ARB 05 (05A) has intensified into a tropical storm while located roughly 875 km (545 mi) northwest of Lakshadweep, India.
- 12:00 UTC at 14.0°N 64.0°E – The IMD reports that Deep Depression ARB 05 (05A) has intensified into a cyclonic storm and names it "Megh" while the system is located roughly 910 km (565 mi) southeast of Duqm, Oman.

7 November

- 06:00 UTC (11:30 a.m. IST) at 12.7°N 59.2°E – The IMD reports that Cyclonic Storm Megh (05A) has intensified into a severe cyclonic storm while located roughly 575 km (355 mi) east of Socotra.
- 06:00 UTC (11:30 a.m. IST) at 12.7°N 59.3°E – The JTWC reports that Tropical Storm Megh (05A) has intensified into a category 1 tropical cyclone while located roughly 585 km (365 mi) east of Socotra.
- 15:00 UTC (8:30 p.m. IST) at 12.6°N 57.9°E – The IMD reports that Severe Cyclonic Storm Megh (05A) has intensified into a very severe cyclonic storm while located roughly 435 km (270 mi) east of Socotra.
- 18:00 UTC (11:30 p.m. IST) at 12.8°N 57.3°E – The JTWC reports that Tropical Cyclone Megh (05A) has intensified into a category 2 tropical cyclone while located roughly 370 km (230 mi) east of Socotra.

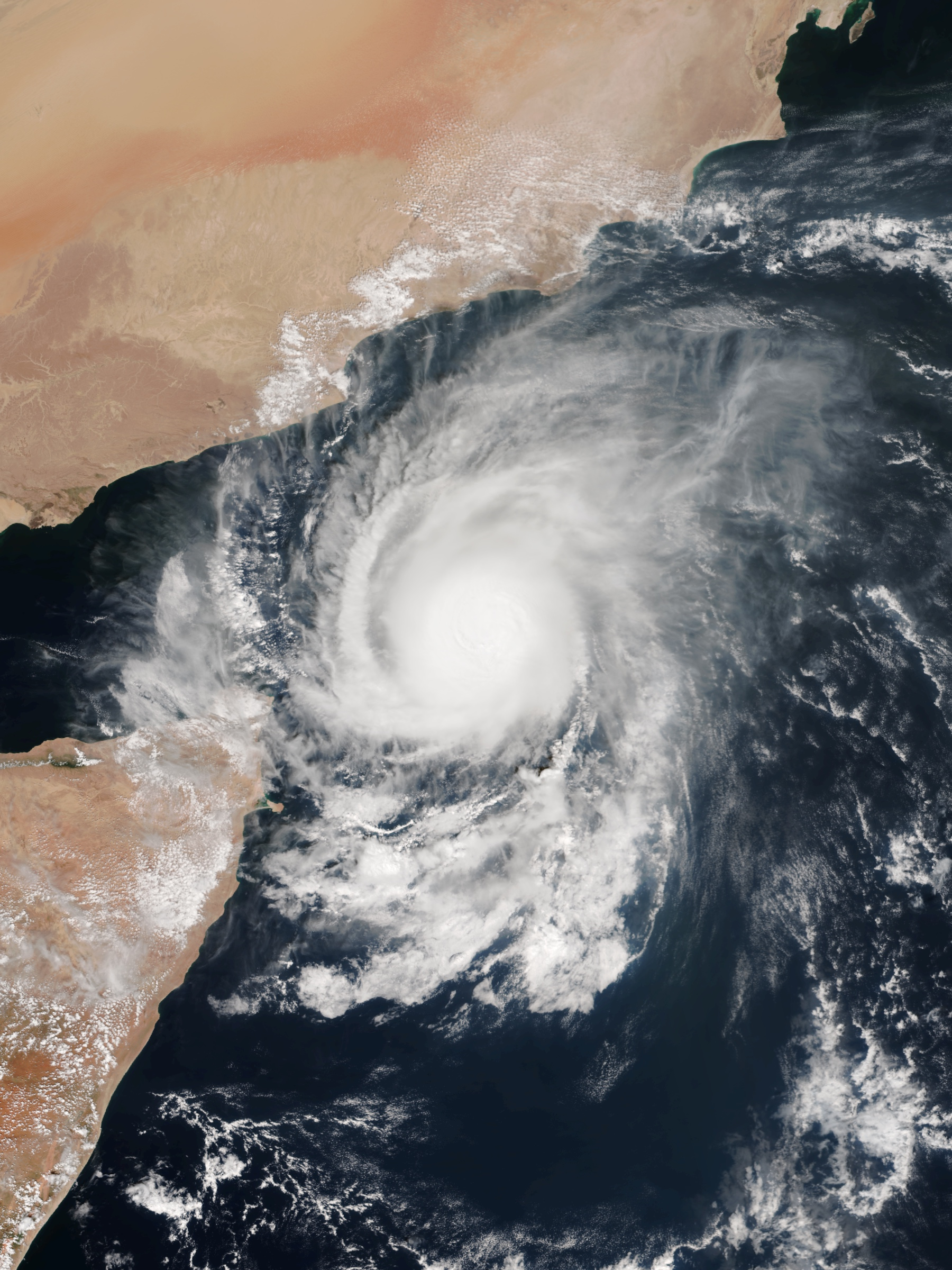
Extremely Severe Cyclonic Storm Megh (05A) at peak intensity just north of Socotra on 8 November

8 November

- 00:00 UTC (5:30 a.m. IST) at 12.7°N 56.1°E – The JTWC reports that Tropical Cyclone Megh (05A) has intensified into a category 3 tropical cyclone while located roughly 240 km (150 mi) east of Socotra.
- 03:00 UTC (8:30 a.m. IST) at 12.7°N 55.5°E – The IMD reports that Very Severe Cyclonic Storm Megh (05A) has intensified into an extremely severe cyclonic storm while located roughly 175 km (110 mi) east of Socotra.
- 03:00 UTC (8:30 a.m. IST) at 10.7°N 83.7°E – The IMD reports that Depression BOB 03 has formed from an area of low pressure while located roughly 360 km (225 mi) northeast of Trincomalee, Sri Lanka.
- 06:00 UTC (11:30 a.m. IST) at 12.7°N 54.9°E – The IMD reports that Extremely Severe Cyclonic Storm Megh (05A) has reached its peak intensity, with 3-minute sustained wind speeds of 175 km/h (110 mph), while located roughly 110 km (70 mi) east of Socotra.
- 06:00 UTC (11:30 a.m. IST) at 12.6°N 54.9°E – The JTWC reports that Tropical Cyclone Megh (05A) has reached its peak intensity, with maximum 1-minute wind speeds of 200 km/h (125 mph), while located roughly 110 km (70 mi) east of Socotra.
- 06:00–12:00 UTC (11:30 a.m.–5:30 p.m. IST) at 12.7°N 54.2°E – The IMD reports that Extremely Severe Tropical Cyclone Megh has made landfall on the northern coast of Socotra with maximum 3-minute sustained wind speeds of 175 km/h (110 mph).
- 12:00 UTC (5:30 p.m. IST) at 12.6°N 53.5°E – The JTWC reports that Tropical Cyclone Megh (05A) has weakened into a category 2 tropical cyclone while located roughly 45 km (30 mi) west of Socotra.
- 18:00 UTC (11:30 p.m. IST) at 11.2°N 81.4°E – The IMD reports that Depression BOB 03 has intensified into a deep depression while located roughly 195 km (120 mi) southeast of Pondicherry, Puducherry. Simultaneously, they report that the storm has reached its peak intensity, with maximum 3-minute sustained wind speeds of 55 km/h (35 mph).
- 18:00 UTC (11:30 p.m. IST) at 12.4°N 52.1°E – The JTWC reports that Tropical Cyclone Megh (05A) has weakened into a category 1 tropical cyclone while located roughly 155 km (95 mi) east of Alula, Somalia.

9 November

- 00:00 UTC (5:30 a.m. IST) at 12.3°N 51.0°E – The IMD reports that Extremely Severe Cyclonic Storm Megh (05A) has made its closest approach to the Somali coast, passing roughly 45 km (30 mi) northeast of Alula, Somalia as it weakens into a very severe cyclonic storm.
- 06:00 UTC (11:30 a.m IST) at 12.2°N 49.5°E – The JTWC reports that Tropical Cyclone Megh (05A) has weakened into a tropical storm while located roughly 140 km (85 mi) west of Alula, Somalia.
- 14:00 UTC (7:30 p.m. IST) at 12.2°N 80.0°E – The IMD reports that Deep Depression BOB 03 has made landfall near Marakkanam, Tamil Nadu with maximum 3-minute sustained wind speeds of 55 km/h (35 mph).
- 21:00 UTC (2:30 a.m. IST, 10 November) at 12.7°N 46.8°E – The IMD reports that Very Severe Cyclonic Storm Megh (05A) has weakened into a severe cyclonic storm while located roughly 200 km (125 mi) east of Aden, Yemen.

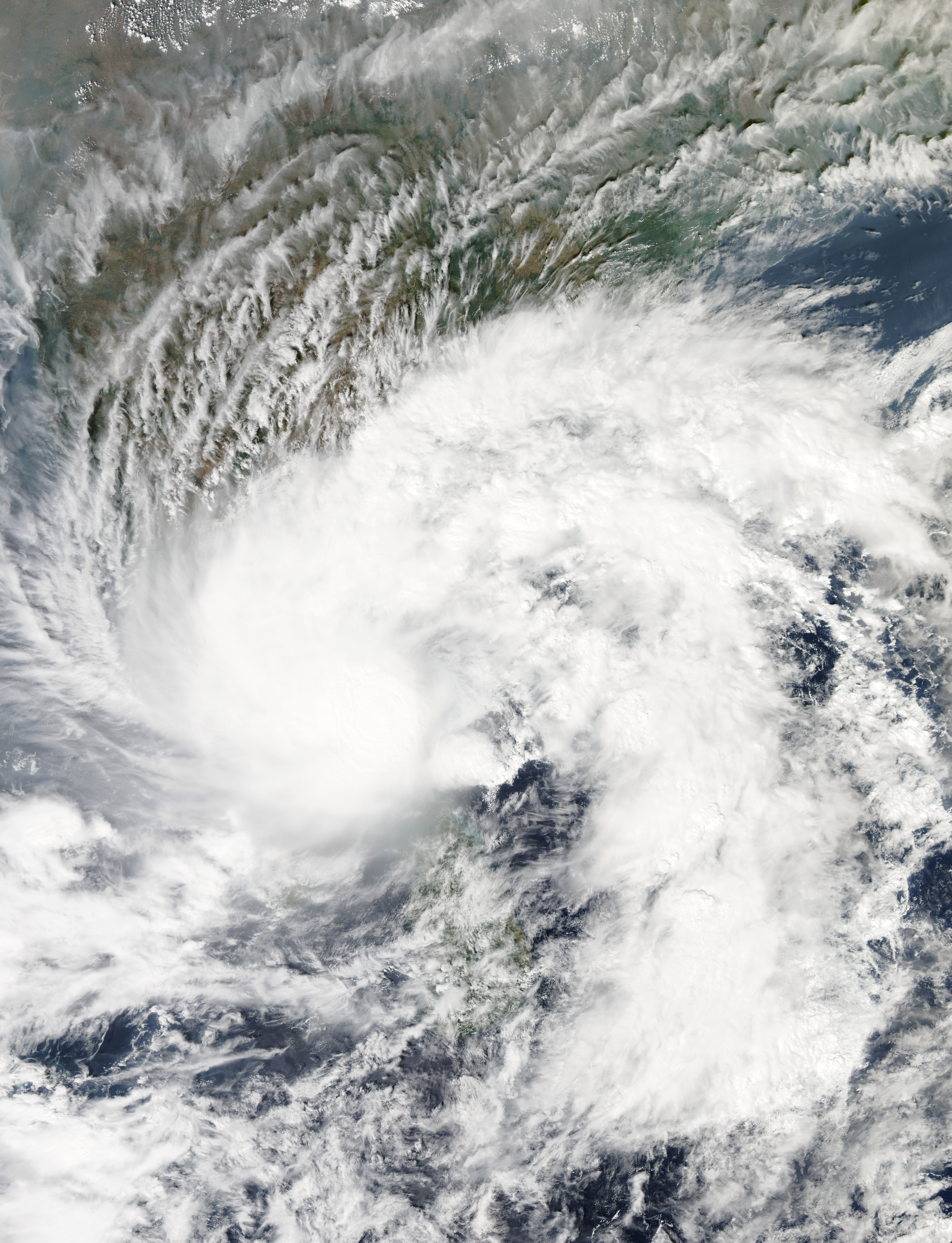
Deep Depression BOB 03 off the southern Indian coast on 9 November

10 November

- 00:00 UTC (5:30 a.m. IST) at 12.8°N 47.6°E – The JTWC reports that Tropical Storm Megh (05A) has weakened into a tropical depression while located roughly 210 km (130 mi) southeast of Ataq, Yemen.
- 03:00 UTC (8:30 a.m. IST) at 13.1°N 46.2°E – The IMD reports that Severe Cyclonic Storm Megh (05A) has weakened into a cyclonic storm while located roughly 130 km (80 mi) east of Aden, Yemen.
- 03:00 UTC (8:30 a.m. IST) at 12.4°N 79.3°E – The IMD reports that Deep Depression BOB 03 has weakened into a depression while located roughly 75 km (45 mi) northwest of Pondicherry, Puducherry.
- 06:00 UTC (11:30 a.m. IST) at 13.3°N 46.1°E – The IMD reports that Cyclonic Storm Megh (05A) has weakened into a deep depression while located roughly 125 km (80 mi) east of Aden, Yemen.
- 06:00 UTC (11:30 a.m. IST) at 12.4°N 79.3°E – The IMD reports that Depression BOB 03 has weakened into a well-marked low-pressure area while located over northern Tamil Nadu.
- 09:00 UTC (2:30 p.m. IST) at 13.4°N 46.1°E – The IMD reports that Deep Depression ex-Megh (05A) has made landfall on the Yemeni mainland 60 km (35 mi) southeast of Lawdar with maximum 3-minute sustained wind speeds of 55 km/h (35 mph).
- 12:00 UTC (5:30 p.m. IST) at 13.6°N 46.5°E - The IMD reports that Deep Depression ex-Megh (05A) has weakened into a depression while located roughly 85 km (55 mi) southeast of Lawdar, Yemen.
- 12:00 UTC (5:30 p.m. IST) at 13.7°N 46.7°E – The JTWC reports that Tropical Depression Megh (05A) has weakened into an area of low pressure and dissipated while located roughly 90 km (55 mi) east of Lawdar, Yemen.
- 18:00 UTC (11:30 p.m. IST) at 13.6°N 46.5°E – The IMD reports that Depression ex-Megh (05A) has weakened into a well-marked low-pressure area over Yemen.

== See also ==
- Timeline of the 2015 Atlantic hurricane season
- Timeline of the 2015 Pacific hurricane season
- Timeline of the 2015 Pacific typhoon season
