= List of highways numbered 133 =

The following highways are numbered 133:

== Canada ==
- New Brunswick Route 133
- Ontario Highway 133 (former)
- Prince Edward Island Route 133
- Quebec Route 133

== Costa Rica ==
- National Route 133

== Cuba ==
- Jatibonico–Falla Road (4–133, 5–133)

== India ==
- National Highway 133 (India)

== Japan ==
- Japan National Route 133

== United Kingdom ==
- A133 road

== United States ==
- Alabama State Route 133
  - County Route 133 (Lee County, Alabama)
- Arkansas Highway 133
- California State Route 133
- Colorado State Highway 133
- Connecticut Route 133
- County Road 133 (Columbia County, Florida)
  - County Road 133B (Columbia County, Florida)
  - County Road 133C (Columbia County, Florida)
- Georgia State Route 133
- Illinois Route 133
- Indiana State Road 133 (former)
- Iowa Highway 133 (former)
- K-133 (Kansas highway) (former)
- Kentucky Route 133
- Louisiana Highway 133
- Maine State Route 133
- Maryland Route 133
- Massachusetts Route 133
- Missouri Route 133
- Nebraska Highway 133
- New Jersey Route 133
- New Mexico State Road 133
- New York State Route 133
  - County Route 133 (Cortland County, New York)
  - County Route 133 (Montgomery County, New York)
  - County Route 133 (Niagara County, New York)
  - County Route 133 (Onondaga County, New York)
  - County Route 130 (Rensselaer County, New York)
  - County Route 133 (Schenectady County, New York)
  - County Route 133 (Sullivan County, New York)
  - County Route 133 (Tompkins County, New York)
- North Carolina Highway 133
- Ohio State Route 133
- Oklahoma State Highway 133
- Pennsylvania Route 133 (former)
- South Carolina Highway 133
- Tennessee State Route 133
- Texas State Highway 133 (former)
  - Texas State Highway Spur 133
  - Farm to Market Road 133
- Utah State Route 133
  - Utah State Route 133 (1933-1969) (former)
- Vermont Route 133
- Virginia State Route 133
  - Virginia State Route 133 (1926-1928) (former)
  - Virginia State Route 133 (1930-1933) (former)
- Wisconsin Highway 133
- Wyoming Highway 133

Territories

- Puerto Rico Highway 133

Preceded by 132	Lists of highways 133	Succeeded by 134
