= List of highways numbered 131 =

The following highways are numbered 131:

== Canada ==
- Ontario Highway 131 (former)
- Prince Edward Island Route 131
- Quebec Route 131

== Costa Rica ==
- National Route 131

== Cuba ==
- Guanabacoa–Jaruco Road (2–131)

== India ==
- National Highway 131 (India)

== Italy ==
- State road 131

== Japan ==
- Japan National Route 131

== United Kingdom ==
- A131 road

== United States ==
- U.S. Route 131
- Alabama State Route 131
  - County Route 131 (Lee County, Alabama)
- Arkansas Highway 131
- California State Route 131
- Colorado State Highway 131
- Connecticut Route 131
- Florida State Road 131 (former)
  - County Road 131 (Columbia County, Florida)
- Georgia State Route 131 (former)
- Illinois Route 131
- Indiana State Road 131 (former)
- Iowa Highway 131 (former)
- K-131 (Kansas highway)
- Kentucky Route 131
- Louisiana Highway 131
- Maine State Route 131
- Maryland Route 131
- Massachusetts Route 131
- M-131 (Michigan highway) (former)
- Missouri Route 131
- Nebraska Highway 131 (former)
- County Route 131 (Bergen County, New Jersey)
- New Mexico State Road 131
- New York State Route 131
  - County Route 131 (Cayuga County, New York)
  - County Route 131 (Cortland County, New York)
  - County Route 131 (Fulton County, New York)
  - County Route 131 (Montgomery County, New York)
  - County Route 131 (Niagara County, New York)
  - County Route 131 (Onondaga County, New York)
  - County Route 131 (Schenectady County, New York)
  - County Route 131 (Tompkins County, New York)
  - County Route 131 (Westchester County, New York)
- North Carolina Highway 131
- Ohio State Route 131
- Oklahoma State Highway 131
- Oregon Route 131
- Pennsylvania Route 131 (former)
- Tennessee State Route 131
- Texas State Highway 131
  - Texas State Highway Spur 131
  - Farm to Market Road 131
- Utah State Route 131
  - Utah State Route 131 (1933–2001) (former)
- Vermont Route 131
- Virginia State Route 131
  - Virginia State Route 131 (1923-1928) (former)
  - Virginia State Route 131 (1928-1933) (former)
- Washington State Route 131
- West Virginia Route 131
- Wisconsin Highway 131
- Wyoming Highway 131

Territories

- Puerto Rico Highway 131

Preceded by 130	Lists of highways 131	Succeeded by 132
