= Perumukkal =

Perumukkal village
- Location in Tamil Nadu, India
- 12.199782°N 79.736441°E
- Location: Villuppuram, India

Perumukkal is a small village in the Tindivanam municipality of the Villuppuram district in the Indian state of Tamil Nadu. The major occupation of its residents is agriculture. In 2011 it had a population of 3,000.

== Etymology ==
During the Chola dynasty, Perumukkal was known as "perumukkilaana gangai konda nalloor" (Tamil: பெருமுக்கிலான கங்கை கொண்ட நல்லூர்). The current name is an abbreviation of this earlier title.

== Location ==
Perumukkal is located 12 kilometres (7.5 mi) east of Tindivanam, 25 kilometres (16 mi) west of Marakkanam on the Tindivanam-Marakkanam road.

== Hospitals and other facilities ==
The medical centers in Perumukkal include perumukkal PHC, Rajeswari Clinic.

== Historical sites ==
The recorded history of Perumukkal dates back six millennia. Historical landmarks in Perumukkal include the 4000 B.C.E. Petroglyph, the 7th century Mukthialeeswarar Temple, the ruined Kamatchiamman temple, and a Dargah.

=== Petroglyphs ===
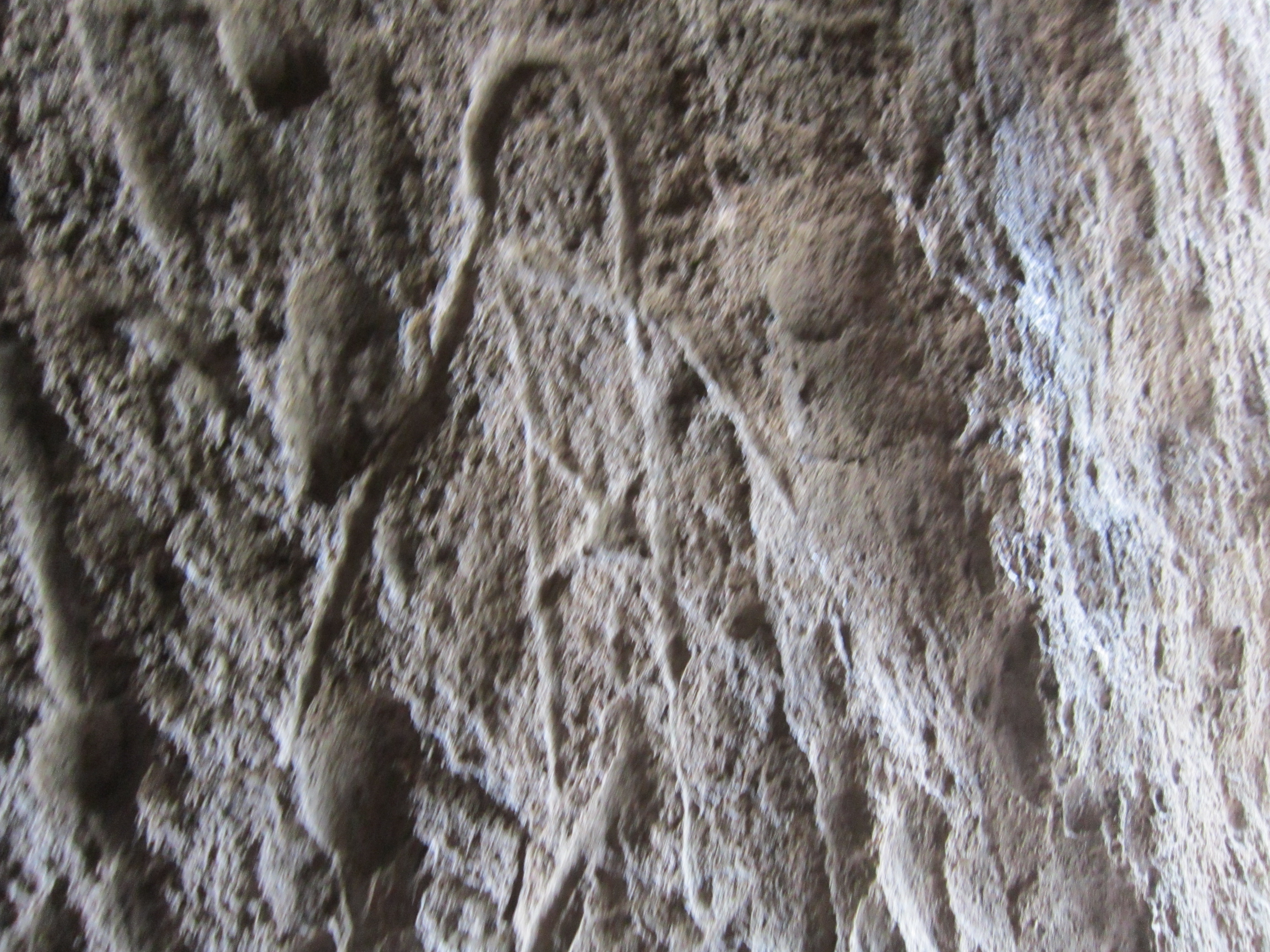
Petroglyph in Perumukkal

Petroglyphs are found in Sita Cave, which is located at the top of a hill near the village. Local people believe Sita, the central female character in the Hindu epic Ramayana, lived in this cave. This is the only petroglyph ever discovered in Tamil Nadu and is one of the four found in India. These petroglyphs are similar to the Egyptian Hieroglyphics letters and hence are believed to be from around 4000 BCE. However, some researchers date these to the megalithic age.

=== Perumukkal Fort ===
The Perumukkal Fort is a small fort about 437 feet above sea level was built by Vijayanagar kings in 14 th Century. Situated on a hill, ruins of the fort are an indication of where it once stood. This fort has been subject to various conquests. In 1761 it was captured by Sir Eyre Coote of the British East India Company. In 1780 the fort was captured by Haider, and regained by the English in 1783. In 1790 it was taken by Tippu.

=== Mukthialeeswarar Temple ===
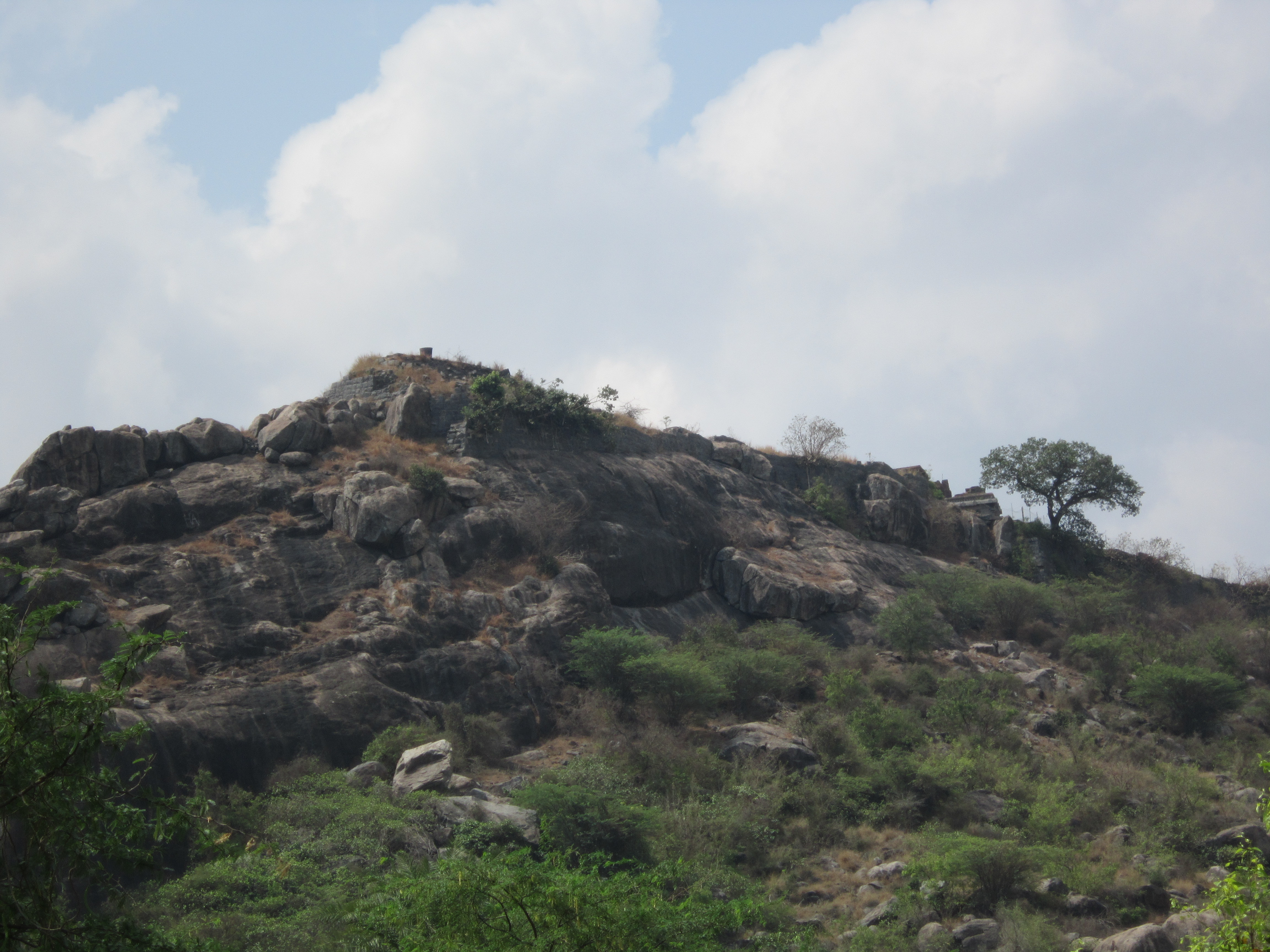
Perumukkal Hillock

The Mukthialeeswarar Temple, located atop of the Perumukkal hillock, had originally been built in brick, was converted to a stone temple during the period of Vikrama Chola (1118-35 CE). The deity of the temple is known as Tiruvanmikai Eswaramudayar, as well as Perumukkal Udayar in Tamil (பெருமுக்கல் உடையார்) and Mukthiyaleeswarar in Sanskrit. The donations made by the Chola, Pandya, Sambuvaraya, Vijayanagara rulers have been recorded in more than 60 Vatteluthu inscriptions found on the temple walls dating back to the 7th century C.E.

=== Anjaneya Temple ===
This temple is present to the south of Mukthialeeswarar Temple. The inscriptions say that it is built by Ambalavan Kandarathithan.

=== Kamatchiamman Temple ===
The temple at the foot of the hill, is called Thiru Kama Kotta Periya Nachiyar koil as per the inscriptions in that temple. The temple is in complete ruins.

== Gallery ==
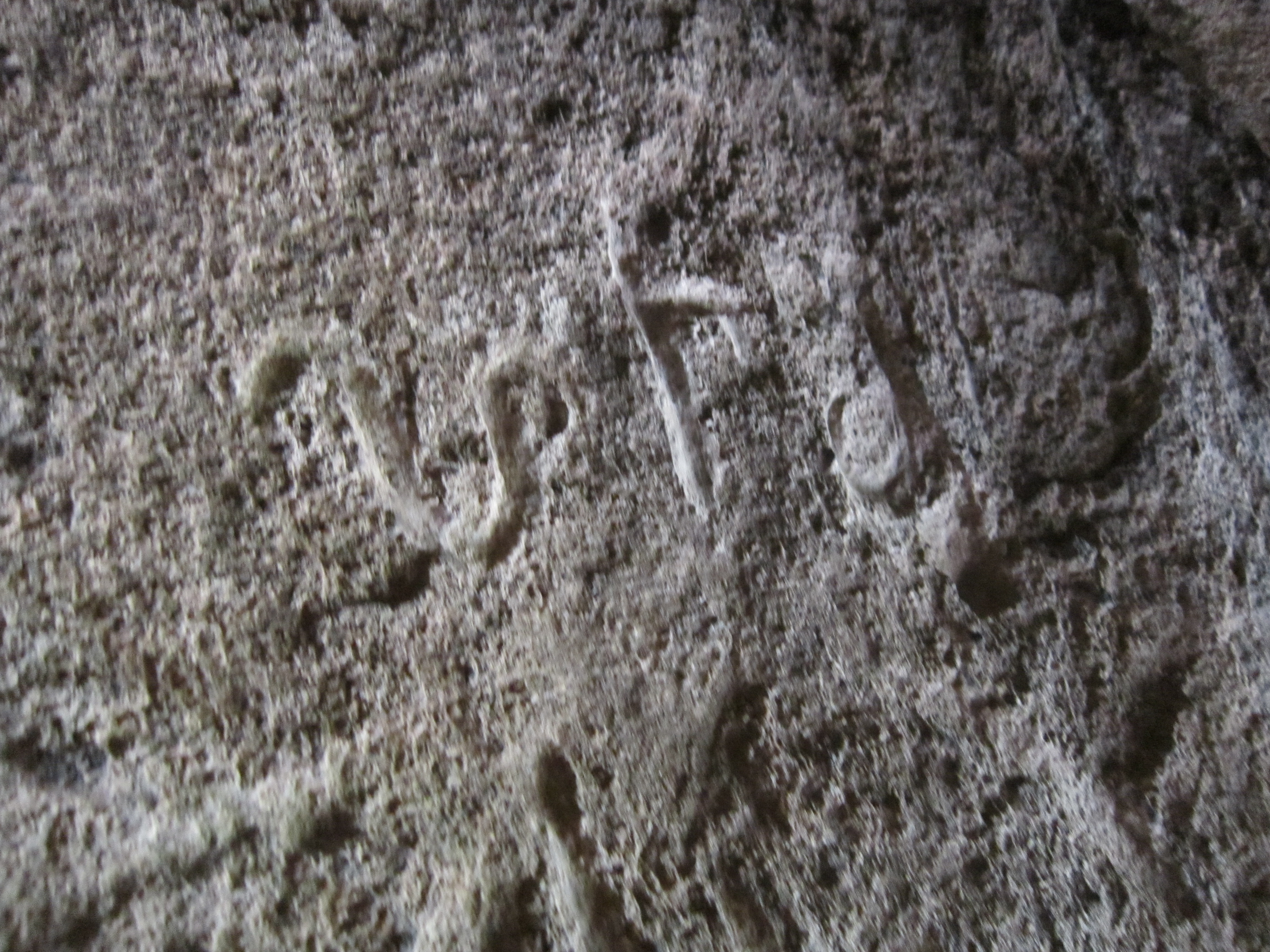
Inscription

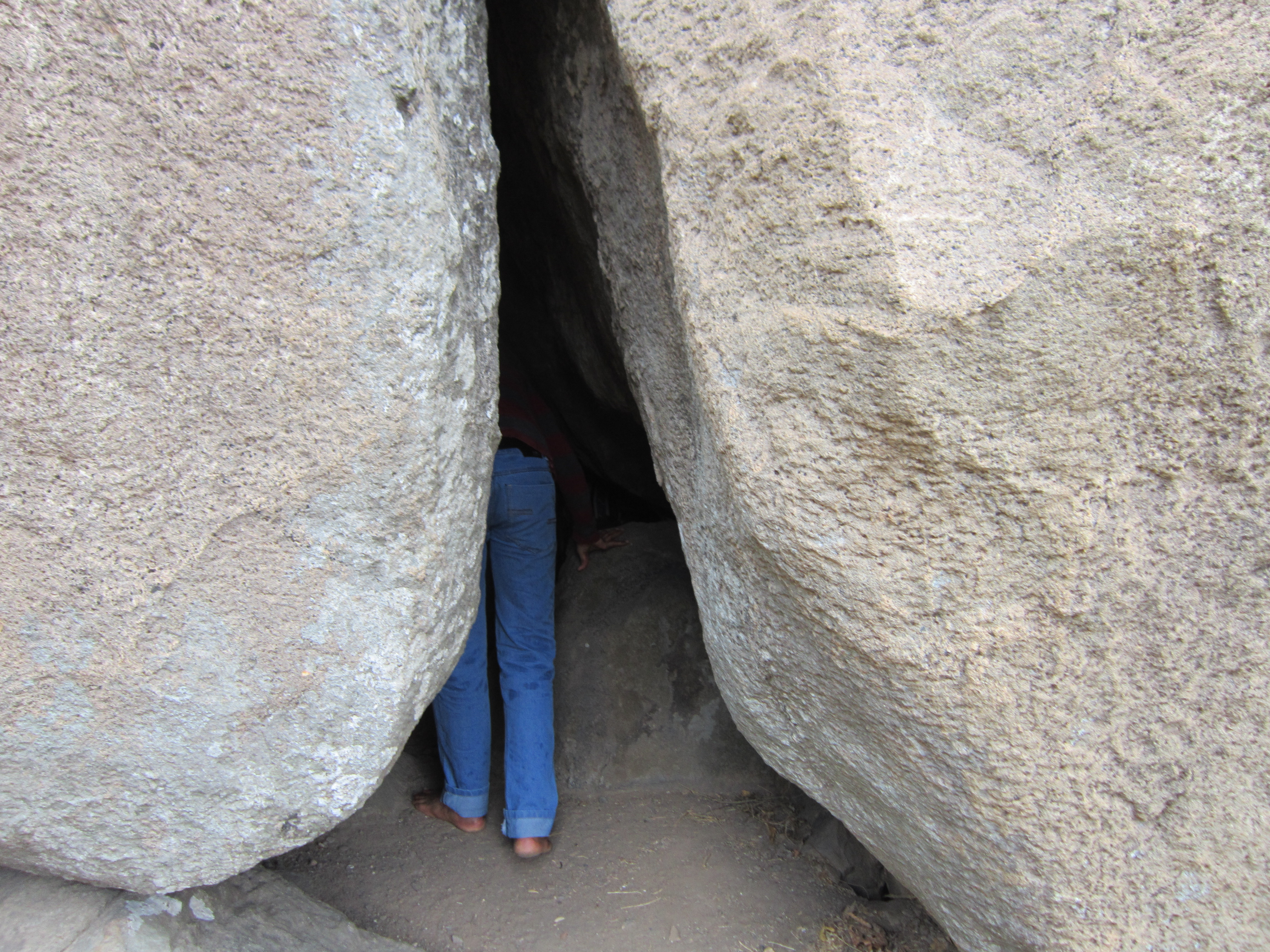
Sita Cave Entrance

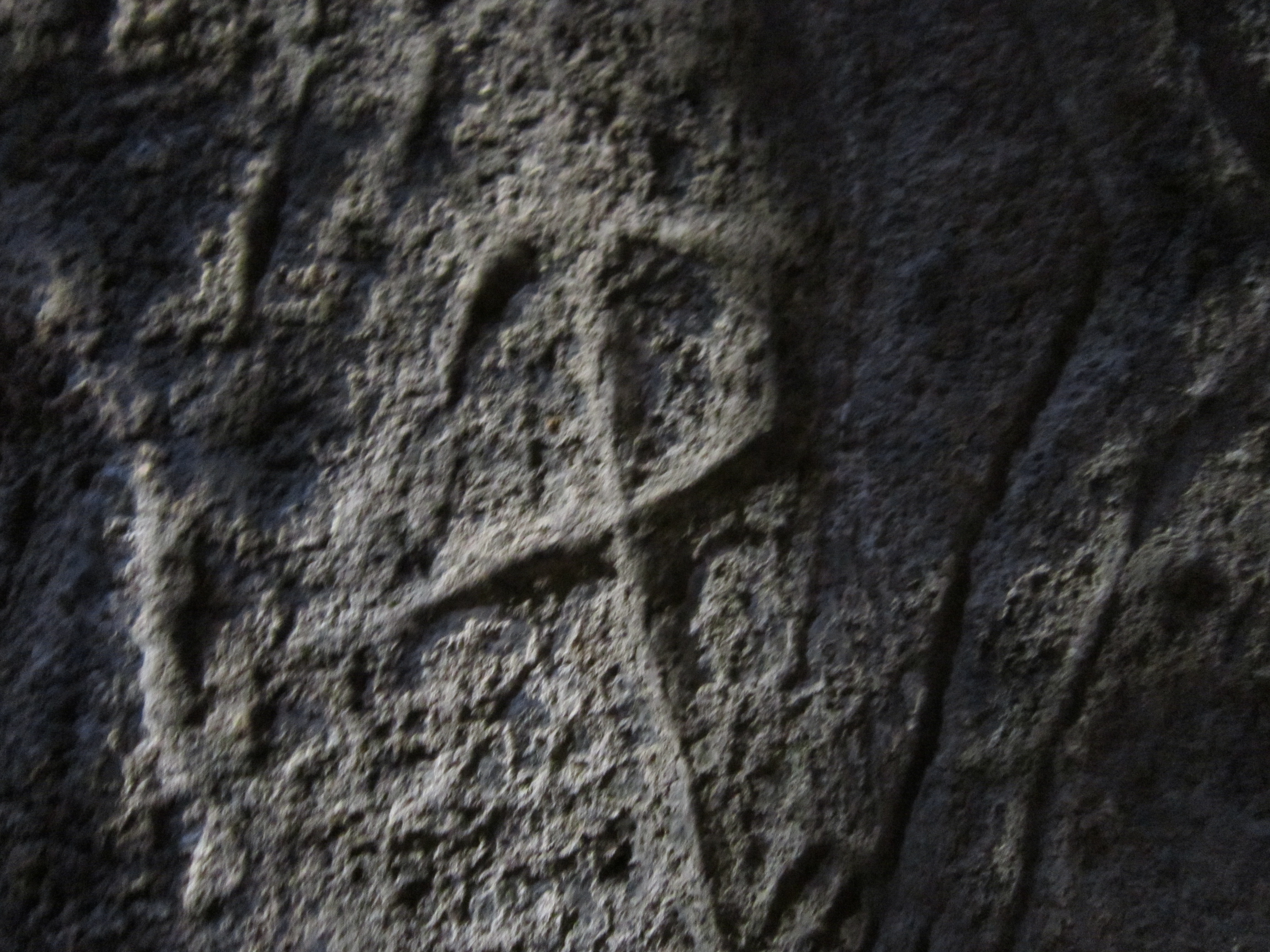
Petroglyph Symbol 1

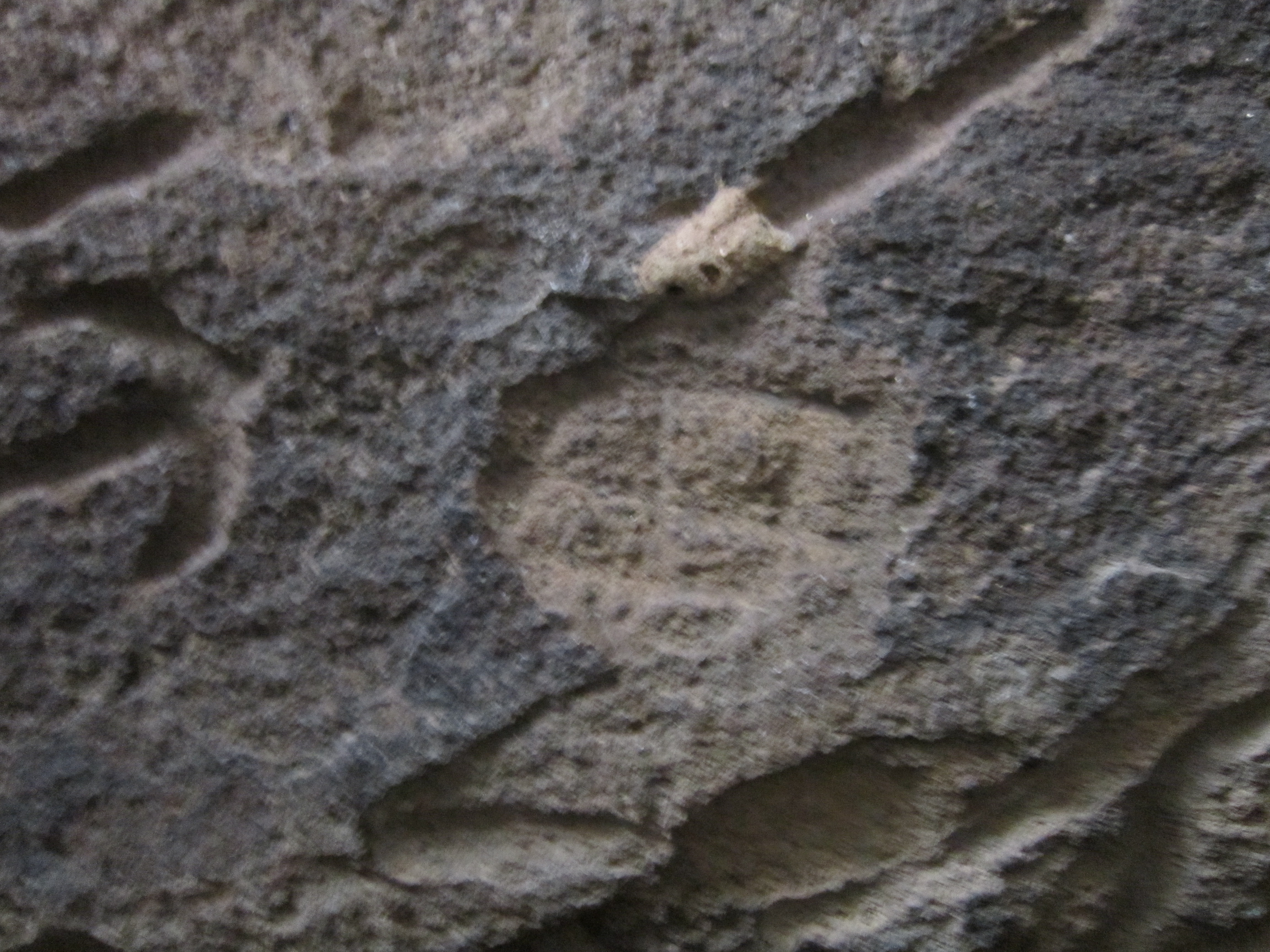
Petroglyph Symbol 2
