= K129 =

K129 or K-129 may refer to:

- K-129 (1947–1966 Kansas highway), a former state highway in Kansas
- K-129 (1980–1997 Kansas highway), a former state highway in Kansas
- Soviet submarine K-129 (1960), a Soviet Union submarine
- Soviet submarine K-129 (1981), a Delta III-class nuclear-powered ballistic missile submarine.
- Symphony No. 17 (Mozart) in G major by Mozart, K.129
