= List of highways numbered 130 =

The following highways are numbered 130:

== Canada ==
- New Brunswick Route 130
- Ontario Highway 130
- Prince Edward Island Route 130

== Costa Rica ==
- National Route 130

== India ==
- National Highway 130 (India)

== Japan ==
- Japan National Route 130

== Republic of Korea (South Korea) ==
- Incheon International Airport Expressway

== Mexico ==
- Mexican Federal Highway 130

== United Kingdom ==
- A130 road

== United States ==
- Interstate 130 (former proposal)
- U.S. Route 130
- Alabama State Route 130
  - County Route 130 (Lee County, Alabama)
  - County Route 130A (Lee County, Alabama)
- Arkansas Highway 130
  - Arkansas Highway 130 (1930s-1950s)(former)
- California State Route 130
- Connecticut Route 130
- County Road 130 (Baker County, Florida)
- Georgia State Route 130
- Hawaii Route 130
- Illinois Route 130
  - Illinois Route 130A (former)
- Indiana State Road 130
- Iowa Highway 130
- K-130 (Kansas highway)
- Kentucky Route 130
- Louisiana Highway 130
- Maine State Route 130
- Maryland Route 130
- Massachusetts Route 130
- M-130 (Michigan highway) (former)
- County Road 130 (Hennepin County, Minnesota)
- Missouri Route 130
- New Hampshire Route 130
- County Route 130 (Bergen County, New Jersey)
- New Mexico State Road 130
- New York State Route 130
  - County Route 130 (Erie County, New York)
  - County Route 130 (Herkimer County, New York)
  - County Route 130 (Niagara County, New York)
  - County Route 130 (Rensselaer County, New York)
- North Carolina Highway 130
- Ohio State Route 130
- Oklahoma State Highway 130
- Oregon Route 130
- Pennsylvania Route 130
- South Carolina Highway 130
- South Dakota Highway 130
- Tennessee State Route 130
- Texas State Highway 130
  - Texas State Highway Loop 130
  - Farm to Market Road 130
- Utah State Route 130
- Virginia State Route 130
  - Virginia State Route 130 (1928-1933) (former)
- Wisconsin Highway 130
- Wyoming Highway 130

Territories

- Puerto Rico Highway 130

Preceded by 129	Lists of highways 130	Succeeded by 131
