= List of highways numbered 132 =

The following highways are numbered 132:

== Australia ==
- Wilmot Road (Tasmania)
- Bells Blvd (Victoria)

== Canada ==
- New Brunswick Route 132
- Ontario Highway 132
- Prince Edward Island Route 132
- Quebec Route 132

== Costa Rica ==
- National Route 132

== Cuba ==
- Road of Rancho Luna (4–132)

== Finland ==
- National Highway 132 (Finland)

== India ==
- National Highway 132 (India)

== Ireland ==
- R132 road (Ireland)

== Japan ==
- Japan National Route 132

== Mexico ==
- Mexican Federal Highway 132

== United Kingdom ==
- A132 road

== United States ==
- Alabama State Route 132
  - County Route 132 (Lee County, Alabama)
- Arkansas Highway 132
  - Arkansas Highway 132 (1920s-1990s) (former)
- California State Route 132
- Connecticut Route 132
- Florida State Road 132 (former)
  - County Road 132 (Hamilton County, Florida)
  - County Road 132 (Suwannee County, Florida)
- Georgia State Route 132
- Hawaii Route 132
- Illinois Route 132
- Indiana State Road 132 (former)
- K-132 (Kansas highway) (former)
- Kentucky Route 132
- Louisiana Highway 132
- Maine State Route 132
- Maryland Route 132
- Massachusetts Route 132
- M-132 (Michigan highway) (former)
- New Hampshire Route 132
- New Mexico State Road 132
- New York State Route 132
  - County Route 132 (Fulton County, New York)
  - County Route 132 (Monroe County, New York)
  - County Route 132 (Onondaga County, New York)
  - County Route 132 (Seneca County, New York)
    - County Route 132A (Seneca County, New York)
  - County Route 132 (Sullivan County, New York)
  - County Route 132 (Tompkins County, New York)
- North Carolina Highway 132
- Ohio State Route 132
- Oklahoma State Highway 132
- Pennsylvania Route 132
- Tennessee State Route 132 (former)
- Texas State Highway 132
  - Texas State Highway Loop 132
  - Farm to Market Road 132
- Utah State Route 132
- Vermont Route 132
- Virginia State Route 132
  - Virginia State Route 132Y
  - Virginia State Route 132 (1923-1928) (former)
  - Virginia State Route 132 (1930-1933) (former)
  - Virginia State Route 132 (1933-1943) (former)
- Wisconsin Highway 132 (former)
- Wyoming Highway 132

Territories:

- Puerto Rico Highway 132

Preceded by 131	Lists of highways 132	Succeeded by 133
