= Brahmadesam, Tindivanam taluk =

Brammadesam
- village
- Location in Tamil Nadu, India Brammadesam (India)
- Coordinates: 12°11′51″N 79°46′47″E
- Country: India
- State: Tamil Nadu
- District: Villupuram District

Population (2001)
  - Total: 2,700

Languages
  - Official: Tamil
- Time zone: UTC+5:30 (IST)
- PIN: 604301
- Vehicle registration: TN-16
- Nearest city: Pondicherry (30 km), Chennai (about 150 km)
- Sex ratio: 1.03 ♂/♀
- Literacy: 51.04 %
- Lok Sabha constituency: Villupuram

Brammadesam is an Indian Panchayat village located in Tindivanam taluk of Villupuram district in the state of Tamil Nadu. It is one of the 56 village panchayats coming under Marakkanam block of the Villupuram district. The village code for Brahmadesam is 10 and it falls under the Marakkanam Block (Block Code.12). Br Guys team at brammadesam.

== Etymology ==
The word Brammadesam (also spelled as Brahmadesam) means "Country of Brahma" in Tamil. There are at least five other villages in Tamil Nadu, also named as "Brahmadesam". One of these villages is in the same district as this one, but in the Viluppuram Taluk. The other four are located in Tirunelveli, Thiruvannamalai, Perambalur and Erode districts respectively.

== Demographics ==
According to the 2001 census, the population of Brammadesam was 2674 with a total of 591 households. The female to male sex ratio was 0.965 with 1361 males and 1313 females. The literacy rate in the village was 51.04%.

== Economy ==
The majority of the people in Brammadesam are involved in agriculture. Crops grown in the village include Paddy, Sugarcane, Casuarina, groundnut, cotton, and a few other pulses. The village also has a farmers Market where locally grown vegetables, handicrafts are sold every Wednesday. This market is also a major hub for cattle trade which attracts cattle buyers and sellers from nearby villages and hamlets.

== Education ==
To cater for the educational needs of rural students the Government of Tamil Nadu has set up one Government Higher Secondary School and one Panchayat Union middle schools administered by the Department of School Education. Apart from the government schools, private schools - Cornerstone Nursery & Primary School, T.Nallalam and few other private schools are also functioning in the village.

=== Post office ===
Brahmadesam village has sub post office which comes under Tindivanam (Head Office). The village shares the postal code "604301" along with 11 other branch offices of Villupuram district namely Adavallikuthan, Alankuppam, Kilsirivi, Kolathur, Munnur, Nagar, Omipper, Perumukkal, Siruvadi Vadanerkunam, Vaidapakkam.

=== Police station ===
The police station of Brahmadesam Village Panchayat located in Tindivanam Taluk of Villupuram District, Tamil Nadu Brahmadesam has a police station in charge of a Sub-Inspector. The village along with nearby villages like Nanalmedu, Rajampalayam, & Vellakulam come under the station's jurisdiction

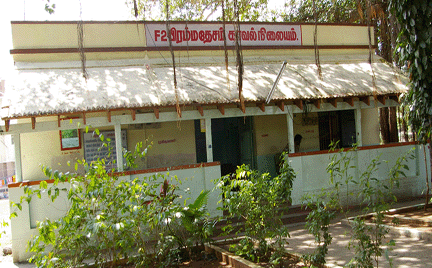
Brahmadesam police station

=== Government Hospital ===
Brahmadesam Village functions with a Primary Health Centre established by the government of Tamil Nadu intended to take care of the health care needs of the rural population in and around Brahmadesam Village. The Primary Health Centre here is looked after by a Medical Officer, Block Extension Educator, one female Health Assistant, a compounder, and laboratory technician.

== Transportation ==
Brammadesam is situated on the State Highway (SH-134) and is well connected to nearest town Tindivanam (16 km) and Pondicherry (About 30 km) by government and private operated buses.

Following are the buses operated by Transport Dept, Govt of Tamil Nadu (TNSTC (VPM DIV I))

Bus No	From	To
1	Tindivanam	Rayanallur
5	Tindivanam	Vandipalayam
15	Tindivanam	Nallur
22	Tindivanam	Munnur
26	Tindivanam	Adavallikuthan
30	Tindivanam	Kilapakkam
189	Marakkanam	Chennai
140	Marakkanam	Tindivanam
227	Marakkanam	Tindivanam
