= Utah State Route 129 (disambiguation) =

Utah State Route 129 may refer to:

- Utah State Route 129 (1931-1933), a former state highway from Moab to Castleton
- Utah State Route 129 (1933-1969), a former state highway near Milford
- Utah State Route 129 (1983-1989), a former state highway in Box Elder County
- Utah State Route 129, the modern route in Utah County

== See also ==
- List of state highways in Utah
- List of highways numbered 129
