= State Highway 134 (Tamil Nadu) =

Road in Tamil Nadu, India

State Highway 134

Route information
- Maintained by Highways and Minor Ports Department
- Length: 34 km (21 mi)

Major junctions
- From: Tindivanam, Villupuram district, Tamil Nadu
- National Highway NH-45 in Tindivanam, National Highway NH-66 in Tindivanam, State Highway SH-49 (East Coast Road) in Marakkanam, State Highway SH-05 at Tindivanam
- To: Marakkanam, Villupuram district, Tamil Nadu

Location
- Country: India
- State: Tamil Nadu
- Districts: Villupuram district
- Primary destinations: Tindivanam, Nallalam, Brahmadesam, Murukkery, Marakkanam

Highway system
- Roads in India; Expressways; National; State; Asian; State Highways in Tamil Nadu

State Highway (SH-134) runs in Villupuram District of Tamil Nadu, India. It connects Tindivanam (Talk Headquarters) with Marakkanam (Panchayat Town). Total length of SH-134 is 34 km.

== Major junctions ==
=== National Highways ===
- National Highway NH-45(GST Road) at Tindivanam
- National Highway NH-66 at Tindivanam

=== State Highways ===
- State Highway SH-49 (East Coast Road) at Marakkanam
- State Highway SH-05 at Tindivanam

== See also ==
- Tamil Nadu State Highways
- State Highway SH-49 (East Coast Road)
