= Munnur =

- village
- Location in Karnataka, India
- Coordinates: 12.82°N 74.87°E
- Country: India
- State: Karnataka
- District: Dakshina Kannada

Population (2001)
  - Total: 8,035

Languages
  - Official: Kannada
- Time zone: UTC+5:30 (IST)

Munnur is a census town in Dakshina Kannada district in the Indian state of Karnataka.

== Demographics ==
As of 2001 India census, Munnur had a population of 8035. Males constitute 48% of the population and females 52%. Munnur has an average literacy rate of 77%, higher than the national average of 59.5%: male literacy is 82%, and female literacy is 73%. In Munnur, 12% of the population is under 6 years of age.
