= List of highways numbered 135 =

The following highways and routes are numbered 135:

== Australia ==
- Hendy Main Road

== Brazil ==
- BR-135

== Canada ==
- Winnipeg Route 135
- New Brunswick Route 135
- Ontario Highway 135 (former)
- Prince Edward Island Route 135
- Saskatchewan Highway 135

== Costa Rica ==
- National Route 135

== India ==
- National Highway 135 (India)

== Japan ==
- Japan National Route 135

== United Kingdom ==
- A135 road
- B135 road

== United States ==
- Interstate 135
- Alabama State Route 135
  - County Route 135 (Lee County, Alabama)
- Arkansas Highway 135
- California State Route 135
- Colorado State Highway 135
- Connecticut Route 135
- Florida State Road 135 (former)
  - County Road 135 (Columbia County, Florida)
  - County Road 135 (Hamilton County, Florida)
- Georgia State Route 135
- Hawaii Route 135
- Illinois Route 135
- Indiana State Road 135
- Iowa Highway 135 (former)
- K-135 (Kansas highway) (former)
- Kentucky Route 135
- Louisiana Highway 135
- Maine State Route 135
- Maryland Route 135
- Massachusetts Route 135
- M-135 (Michigan highway) (former)
- Minnesota State Highway 135
- Missouri Route 135
- Montana Highway 135
- Nebraska Highway 135 (former)
- New Hampshire Route 135
- New Mexico State Road 135 (former)
- New York State Route 135
  - County Route 135 (Herkimer County, New York)
  - County Route 135 (Niagara County, New York)
  - County Route 135 (Schenectady County, New York)
  - County Route 135 (Tompkins County, New York)
  - County Route 135 (Westchester County, New York)
- North Carolina Highway 135
- Ohio State Route 135
- Oklahoma State Highway 135
- Pennsylvania Route 135 (former)
- South Carolina Highway 135
- Tennessee State Route 135
- Texas State Highway 135
  - Texas State Highway Spur 135
  - Farm to Market Road 135
- Utah State Route 135
  - Utah State Route 135 (1933-1969) (former)
  - Utah State Route 135 (1969-1992) (former)
- Virginia State Route 135
  - Virginia State Route 135 (1930-1933) (former)
  - Virginia State Route 135 (1933-1945) (former)
- Wisconsin Highway 135 (former)
- Wyoming Highway 135

Territories

- Puerto Rico Highway 135

| Preceded by 134 | Lists of highways 135 | Succeeded by 136 |
