= Oklahoma State Highway 134 =

In Oklahoma, State Highway 134 may refer to:

- Oklahoma State Highway 134 (1958), now US 385
- Oklahoma State Highway 134 (1963), now SH 325
