= Murukeri =

- village
- Location in Tamil Nadu, India
- Coordinates: 12°12′11″N 79°50′15″E
- Country: India
- State: Tamil Nadu
- District: Villupuram

Languages
  - Official: Tamil
- Time zone: UTC+5:30 (IST)
- Nearest city: Pondicherry

Murukeri is located in Viluppuram district, Tamil Nadu, India. It is a small village in Tindivanam town, but a famous one around neighbouring villages. The people in this village usually perform agriculture to survive.
