= Symphony No. 17 (Mozart) =

1772 composition by W. A. Mozart

- by W. A. Mozart
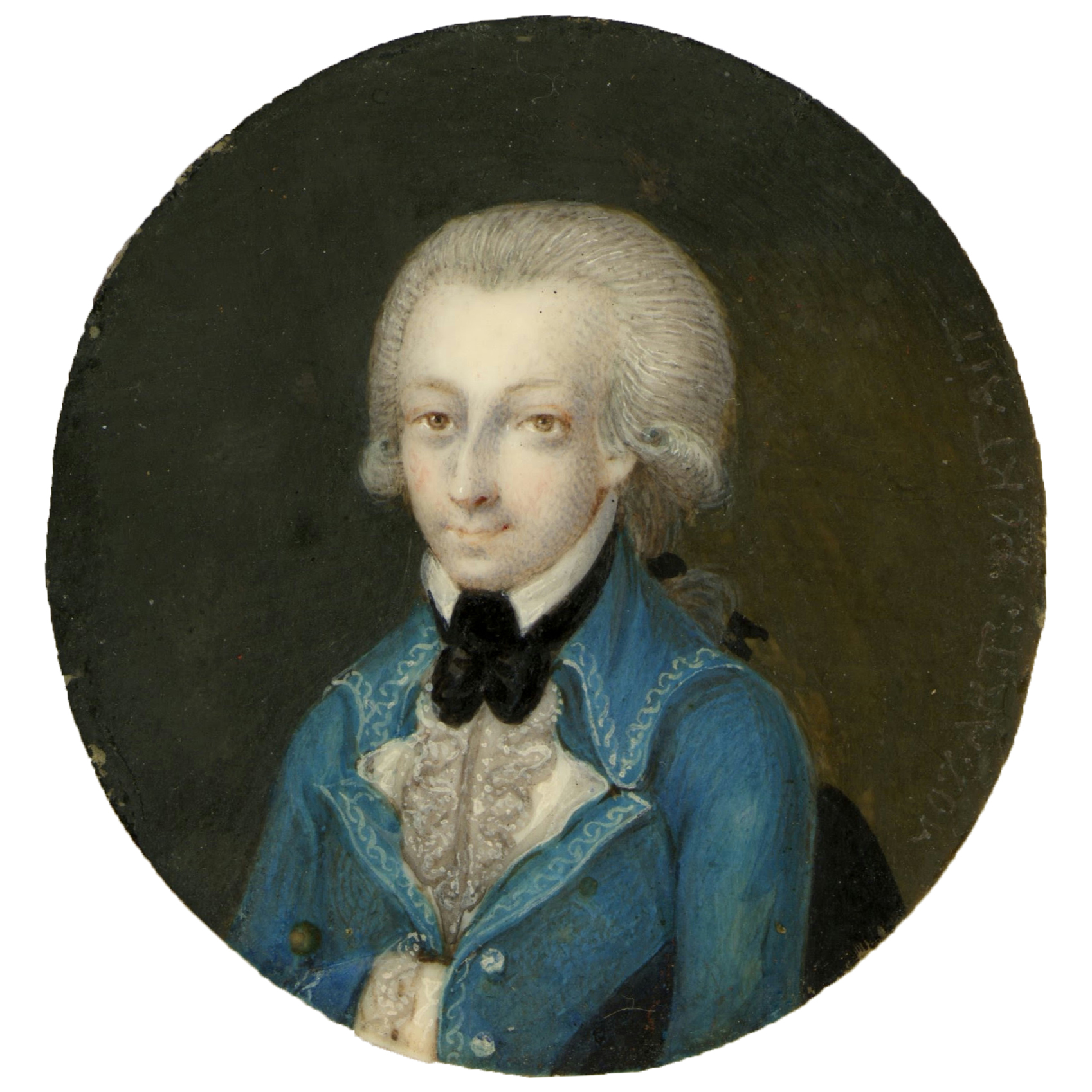
- Mozart in 1773, portrait by Martin Knoller
- Key: G major
- Catalogue: K. 129
- Composed: May 1772
- Duration: c. 12 minutes
- Movements: 3
- Scoring: Orchestra

Symphony No. 17 in G major, K. 129, was the second of three symphonies completed by Wolfgang Amadeus Mozart in May 1772, when he was sixteen years old, but some of its sections may have been written earlier.

== Structure ==
Symphony No. 17, K. 129
I. Allegro (00′ 00″)
II. Andante (04′ 50″)
III. Allegro (10′ 10″)
Performed by the Tsumugi Orchestra conducted by Takashi Inoue (2013)

Mozart wrote the symphony in three movements and it is scored for two oboes, two horns, and strings.

1. Allegro, 4/4
2. Andante, 2/4, C major
3. Allegro, 3/8

The first movement is notable for its use of the Mannheim crescendo, while the second movement features a solo violin.
