= Marakkanam =

Town in Tamil Nadu, India

- town
- Location in Tamil Nadu, India
- Coordinates: 12.2°N 79.95°E
- Country: India
- State: Tamil Nadu
- District: Viluppuram
- Elevation: 14 m (46 ft)

Population (2021)
  - Total: 37,545

Languages
  - Official: Tamil
- Time zone: UTC+5:30 (IST)
- Postal code: 604303
- Vehicle registration: TN-16

Marakkanam is a developing town and taluk in Villupuram district of Tamil Nadu. It is well connected to the state capital Chennai and the nearby union territory of Puducherry by the East Coast Road. To the west, Marakkanam is connected to the city of Tindivanam by the SH-134. Marakkanam is situated on the declared National Waterways NW-4. On materialisation of National Waterways NW-4, Marakkanam will be connected to two states Andhra Pradesh (Kakinada) and Puducherry through north and south of Buckingham Canal.

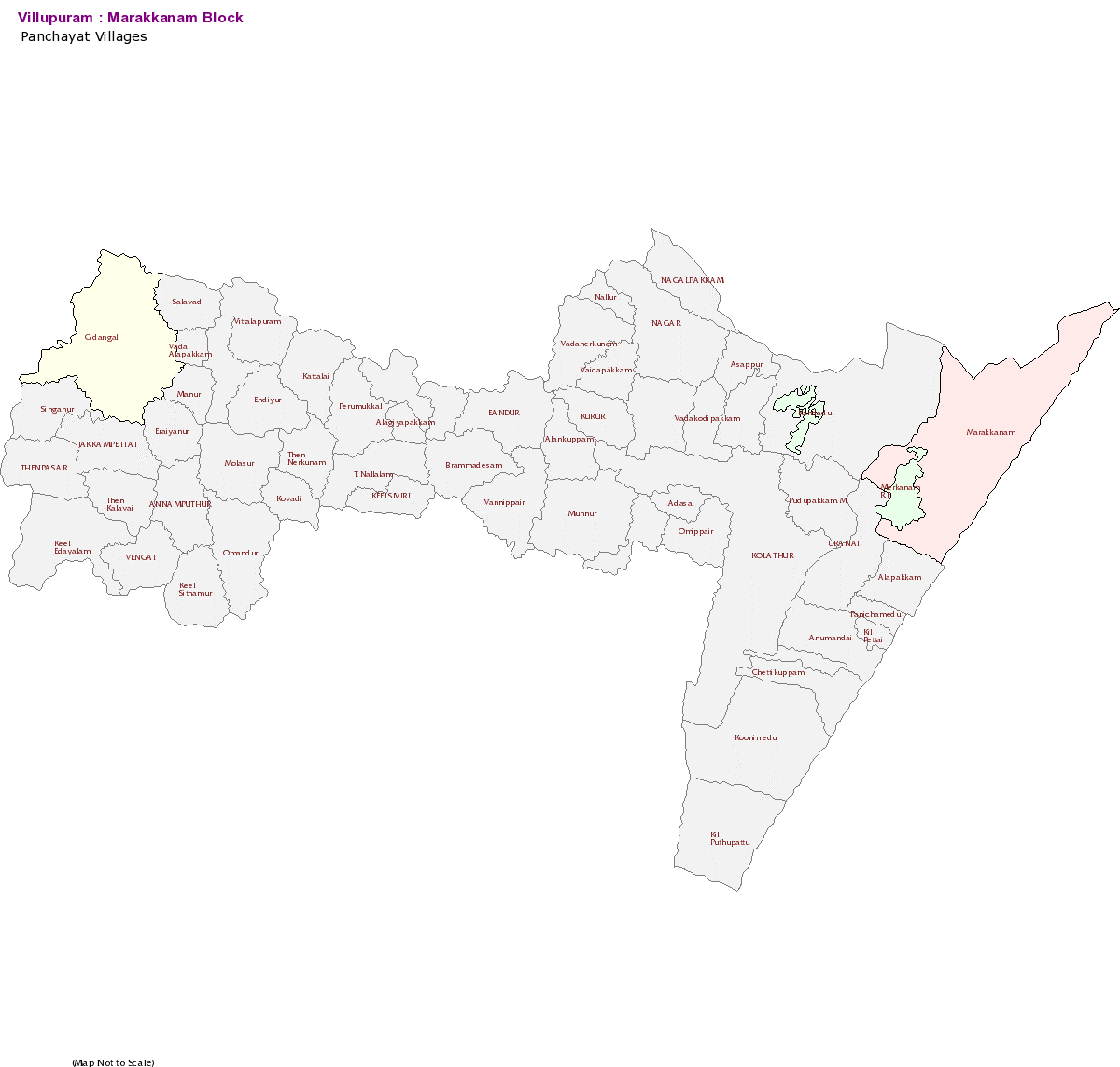
Map indicating blocks of Marakkanam Selection Grade Town Panchayat

== History ==
Marakkanam was connected to Vijayawada in Andhra Pradesh through the Buckingham Canal, a 420 km long fresh water navigation canal. The 110-km stretch from Marakkanam to Chennai is called South Buckingham Canal. The canal connects most of the natural backwaters along the coast to the port of Chennai (Madras). It was constructed by the British Raj, and was an important waterway during the late nineteenth and the twentieth century. Canal was formerly used to convey goods up and down, but later the usage has downgraded due to industrial pollution of water.

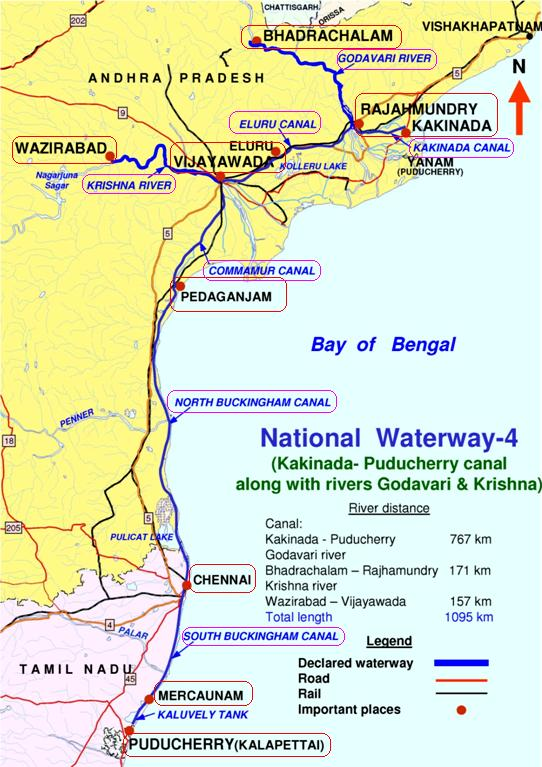
India's National Waterways NW-4 connects Kakinada, in Andhra Pradesh and Pondicherry, in Puducherry. The waterway passes through Rajamundry, Vijayawada, Pedakanjam, Chennai and Marakkanam.

In 2013, a violent clash occurred in this town on the basis of caste, in which two people died.

== Administration ==
Indian Postal code for Marakkanam is 604303.

Marakkanam is a developing town & taluk in Villupuram district was divided into 56 Village Panchayats.The following are the Village Panchayats under Marakkanam

- Adasal
- Adavallikoothan
- Alankuppam
- Alapakkam
- Alathur
- Annamputhur
- Anumandai
- Asappur
- Athur
- Brammadesam
- Chettikuppam
- Cheyyankuppam
- Ekkiyarkuppam
- Endiyur
- Endur
- Eraiyanur
- kazhikuppam
- Jaggampettai
- Kandadu
- Kattalai
- kaippani nagar
- Kilarungunam
- Kiledaiyalam
- Kilpettai
- Kilputhuppattu
- Kilsithamur
- Kilsiviri
- Kolathur
- Koonimedu
- Kovadi
- Kurur
- Manur
- Molasur
- Munnur
- Nadukuppam
- K.N Palayam
- pudhuppakkam
- Kandadu
- Nagalpakkam
- Nagar
- Nallalam.t
- Nallur
- Nalmukkal
- mandur
- Omippair
- Panichamedu
- Perumukkal
- Pudhupakkam.m
- Salavadi
- Singanur
- Thenkalavaii
- Thennerkunam
- Thenpasar
- Urani
- Vada Nerkunam
- Vadaalappakkam
- Vadakottippakkam
- Vaidappakkam
- Vannippair
- Vengai
- Vittalapuram
- Siruvadi

== Demographics ==
As of 2021 India census, Marakkanam had a population of 37,545. Males constitute 50% of the population and females 50%. Marakkanam has an average literacy rate of 61%, higher than the national average of 59.5%: male literacy is 70%, and female literacy is 52%. In Marakkanam, 13% of the population is under 6 years of age.

== Economy ==
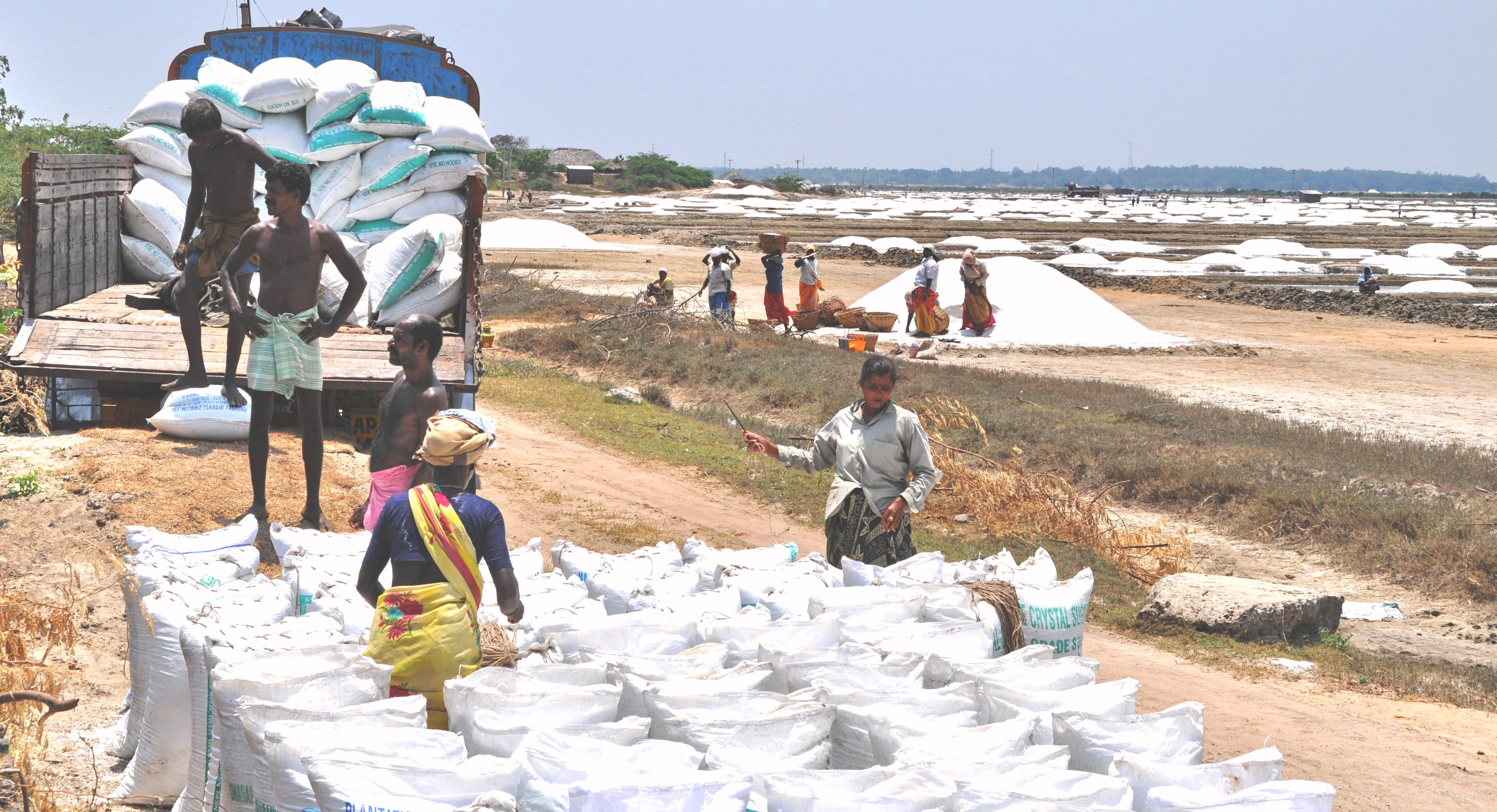
Salt Production at Salt pans of Marakkanam

- Salt Production (Largest Salt Production Happening Next to Tuticorin in every year)
- Fishing
- Agriculture

== Schools ==
- Government Higher Secondary School
- Government Girls High School
- Sri Ramakrishna Matriculation School
- St.Joseph's Primary School (R.C.Primary School)
- Panchayat Union Elementary School
- ALM Matriculation School
- Bharathiyar Matric Higher Secondary school
- J.M.J. Matriculation and Higher l Secondary School
- Good shepherd primary school
- chanakiya vidhyasharam cbse school

== Hospitals ==
Government Hospital, Marakkanam (Near ECR bypass)

== Road Connectivity ==
- 34 km from Tindivanam. It is well connected to the Tindivanam.
- All the buses plying through ECR via Kovalam, Mamallapuram, Kadapakkam Chennai to Pondicherry are connected to Marakkanam.
- Connected to Chennai and Pondicherry with government bus No 83A via Chengalpattu, Madhuranthagam, Soonambedu, Asappur, Allathur
- Connected to Chennai and Marakkanam with government bus No 188A via Kovalam, Mamallapuram, Kalpakkam, Kadapakkam
- Connected to Chennai and Cuddalore with government bus No 162 via Chengalpattu, Madhuranthagam, Soonambedu, Allathur
