= Kandamangalam =

Town in Tamil Nadu, India

- Panchayat Union
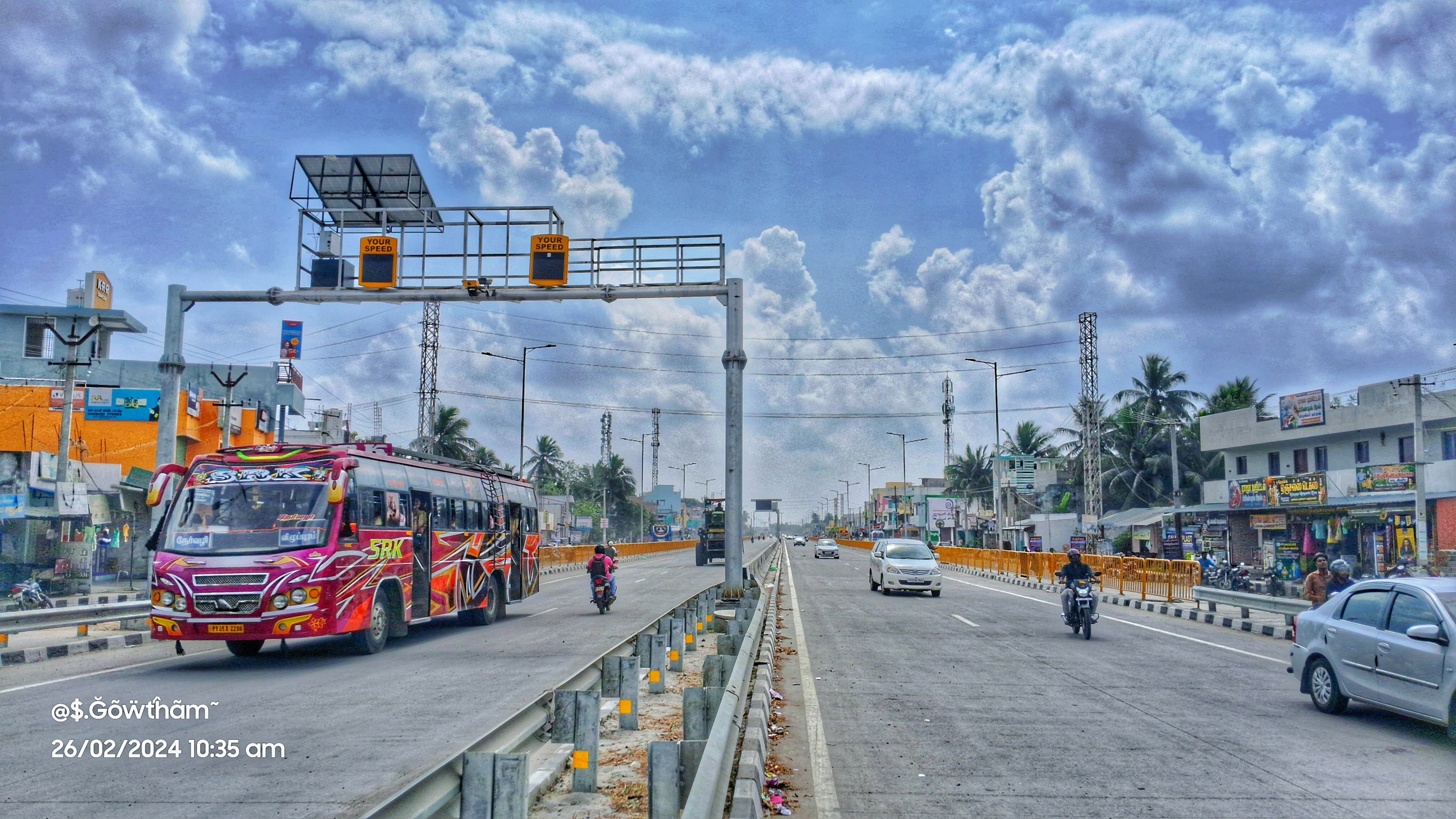
- National Highway 45A passes through Kandamangalam city

- Villupuram, Tamil Nadu
- Coordinates: 11.917660°N 79.684567°E
- Country: India
- State: Tamil Nadu
- Region: Tondai Nadu
- District: Viluppuram
- Taluk: Viluppuram

Government
  - Type: Panchayat Union
  - Body: Kandamangalam Panchayat Union
- Elevation: 23 m (75 ft)

Population (2011)
  - Total: 5,460

Languages
  - Official: Tamil
- Time zone: UTC+5:30 (IST)
- PIN: 605102
- Telephone code: +91–0413(STD Code)
- Vehicle registration: TN–32
- Sex ratio: 996 ♂/♀
- Literacy: 83.65%
- Climate: Aw(Köppen)
- Distance from Chennai: 160 kilometres (99 mi)
- Distance from Viluppuram: 22 kilometres (14 mi)
- Distance from Puducherry: 17 kilometres (11 mi)
- Distance from Cuddalore: 26 kilometres (16 mi)

Kandamangalam (Tamil:கண்டமங்கலம்) is a town in Villupuram district, Villupuram taluk of Tamil Nadu. The town is one of the 13 panchayat unions in Villupuram district. The city falls under Vanur Assembly constituency and Viluppuram Lok Sabha constituency.

== Demographics ==
The Kandamangalam town has population of 5460 of which 2736 are males while 2724 are females as per Population Census 2011.

== Geography ==
Kandamangalam is located in 11.917660°N 79.684567°E. Deccan is also located in the south-eastern part of India. Pondicherry shares its sea border with the Bay of Bengal. Chennai is about 170 km from here, At a distance, Trichy is 190 km, At a distance, Pondicherry is about 17 km, At a distance, Villupuram is 22 kms, At a distance, Cuddalore is 26 km are also located far away.

== Transport ==
=== Road ===
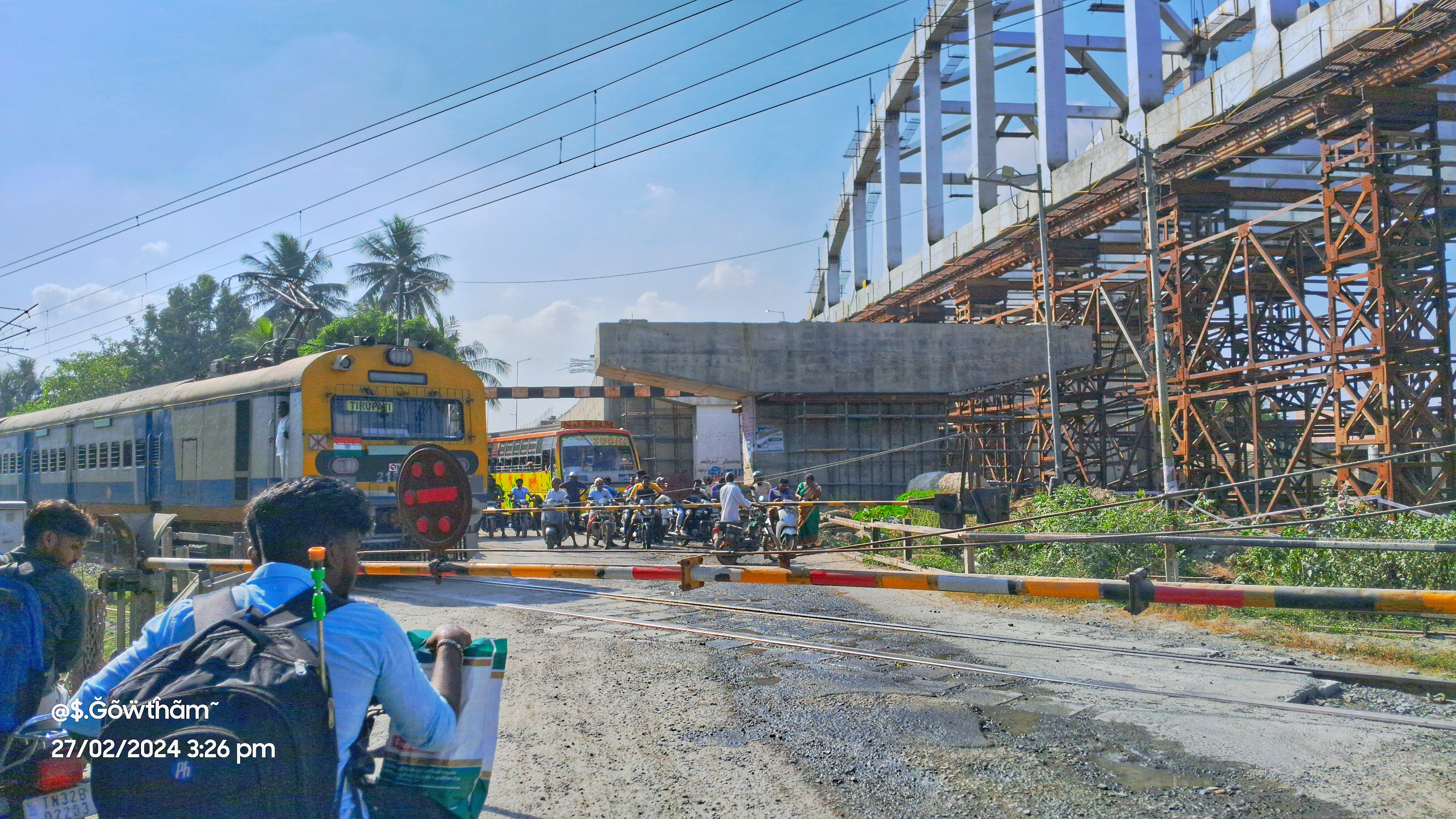
Kandamangalam railway gate.

Puducherry- Villupuram Highway (NH-45A) runs in the places of Villianur, Kandamangalam, Valavanur, Koliyanur. The Project NH 332 (Puducherry to Nagapattinam) which runs in the places of Puducherry, Villiyanur, Kandamangalam Nagapattinam is under process. It has two bus stops- One near BDO Office and another near Old Police Station. There is a 24/7 Bus Facility. You may probably get buses for every 5 mins, buses including ordinary, deluxe buses.

=== Railway Line ===
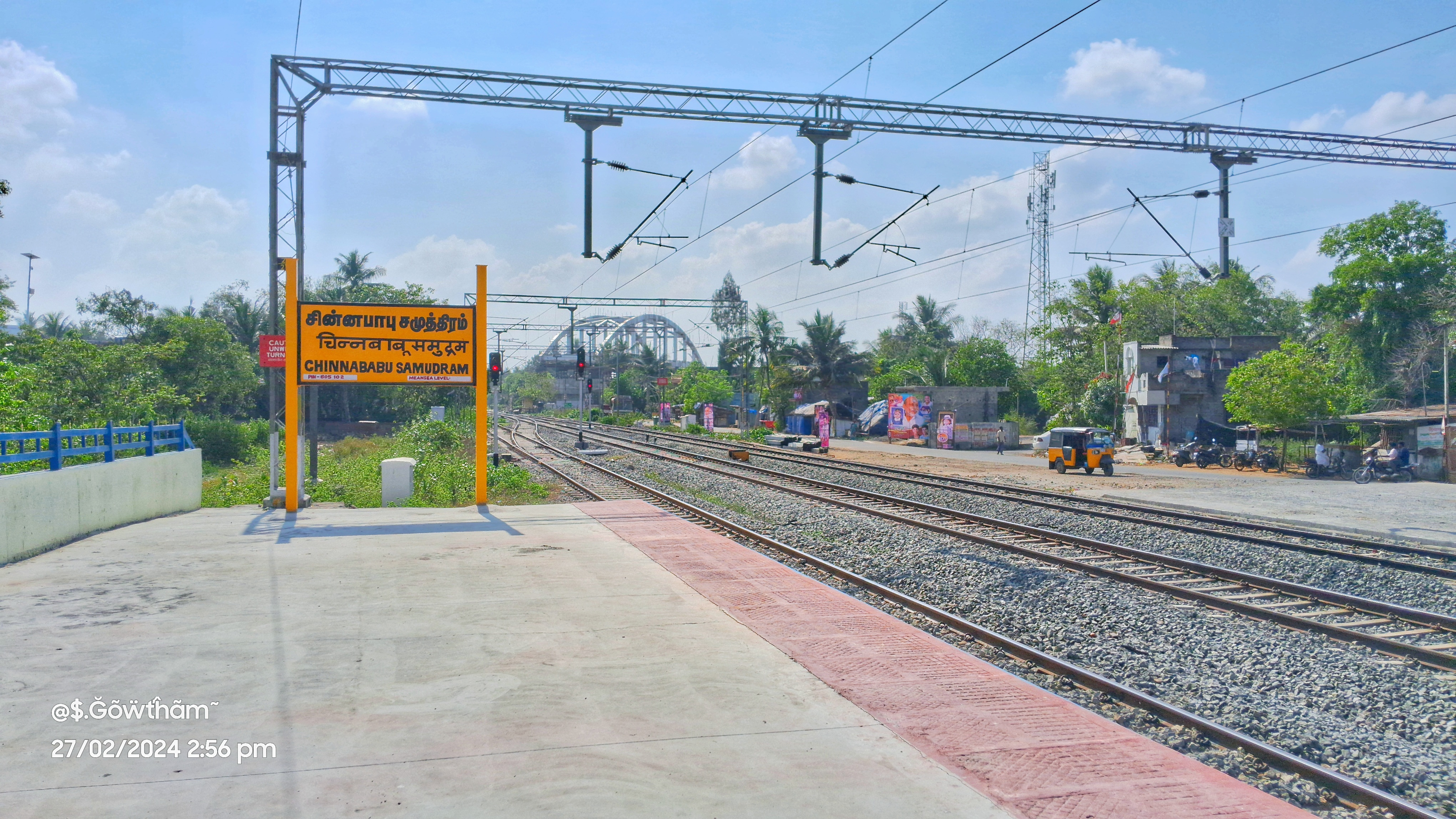
Chinnababusamudram railway station

There is a railway station at Chinnababusamudram village which shares the boundary with Kandamangalam city. It is about 500 meters from Kandamangalam. The Puduchery railway line is one of the oldest rail link in India and it was constructed in the year 1879 by the Puducherry Railway Company during the period of French and British rule in India. One of the boarding points is Chinnababusamudram. Under the supervision of South Indian Railway with the object of connecting the town and the port of Puducherry with South India and to develop the resources of the Puducherry Territory, the rail link between Puducherry and Villupuram has been established. Even though there was total enmity between the then Super Powers—the French and the English—when it came to economic development they had a very good understanding and the Puducherry Railway system was a good example of it.

The station is operated by the Southern Railway zone of the Indian Railways and comes under the Tiruchirapalli railway division. This Division may be the only Division in the world maintaining the Railways developed by both the British and the French empires.

It has daily trains connecting the city with Chennai apart from non-daily trains towards prime cities including Mangaluru, Tiruchirapalli, Bengaluru, Kolkata, New Delhi, Bhubaneshwar and Mumbai via Villupuram.

=== Air ===
The nearest airport to the city is Puducherry Airport, 17 km away.

== Thirunareeswarar Temple ==
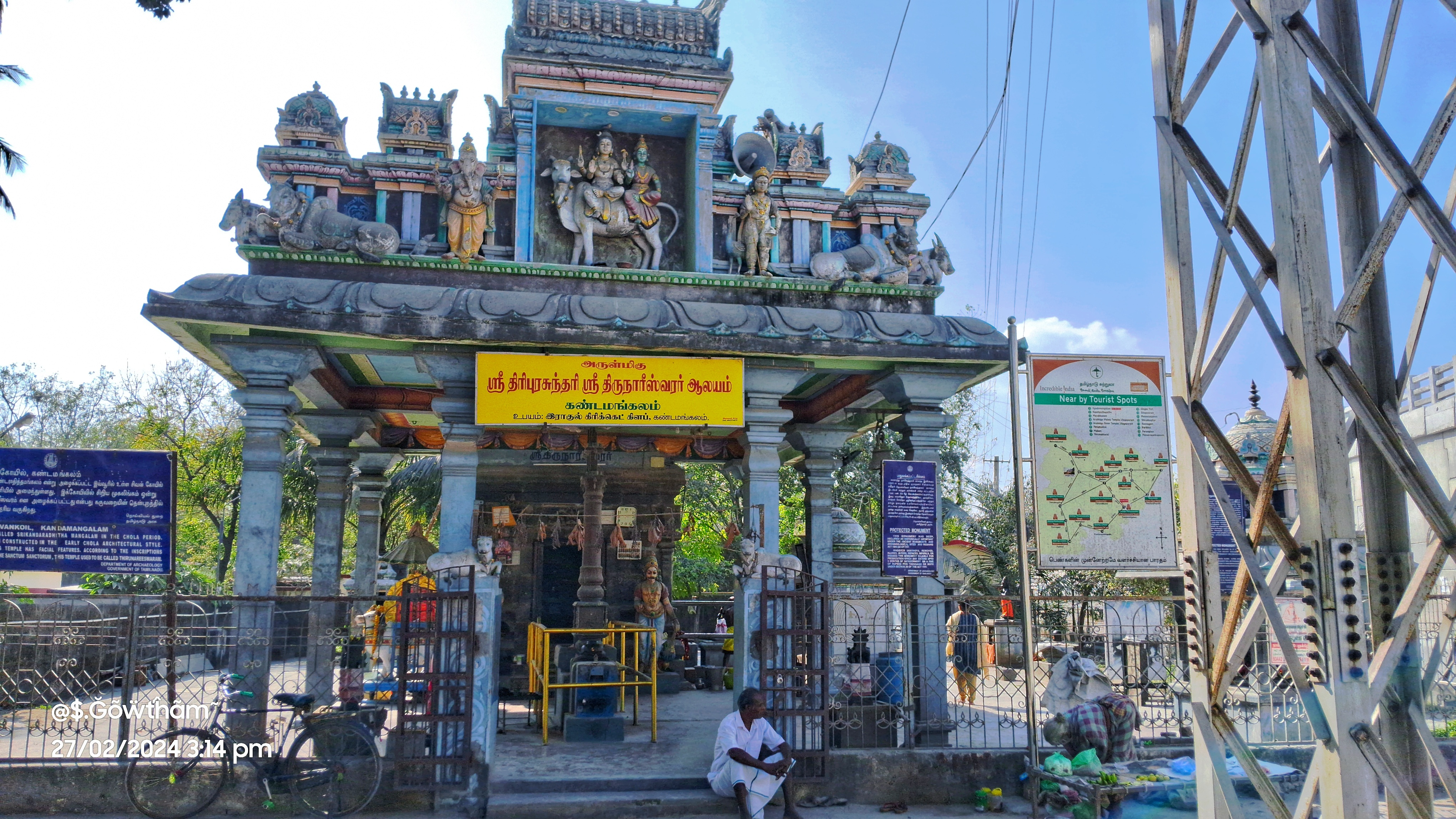
Thirunareeswarar Temple (Lord sivan)

Thirunareeswarar Temple is a Hindu Temple Dedicated to Lord Shiva located at Kandamangalam. The temple is located very near to Union Territory of Puducherry. Presiding deity is called as Thirunareeswarar and mother is called as Thiripurasundari. The Temple is under the control of Archeological Survey of India. This temple was built by Gandaraditya Chola. The temple is facing east with an entrance arch. Palipeedam, Dwajasthambam and Nandhi are situated immediately after the entrance arch. Presiding deity is housed in the sanctum. The sanctum sanctorum consists of sanctum, antarala and arthamandapam. The root is flat on the sanctum without any Vimana. Stucco Images of Dwarabalakars are found at the entrance of sanctum.

== Facilities ==
=== Schools ===
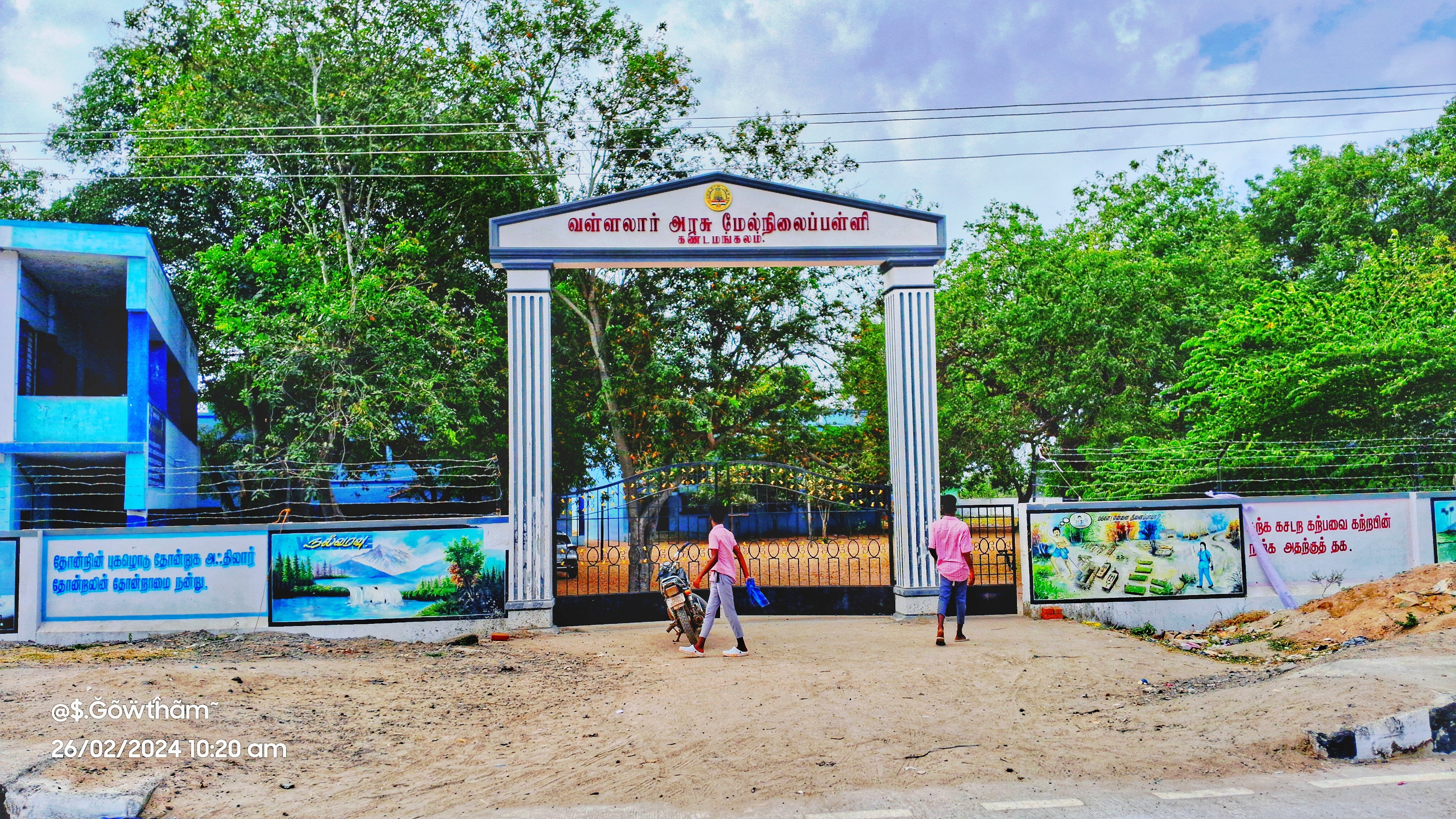
Vallalar govt higher sec school

- Vallalar govt higher sec school
- Govt middle school
- Anganwadi center
- Govt ladies hostel (sc)

=== Govt offices ===
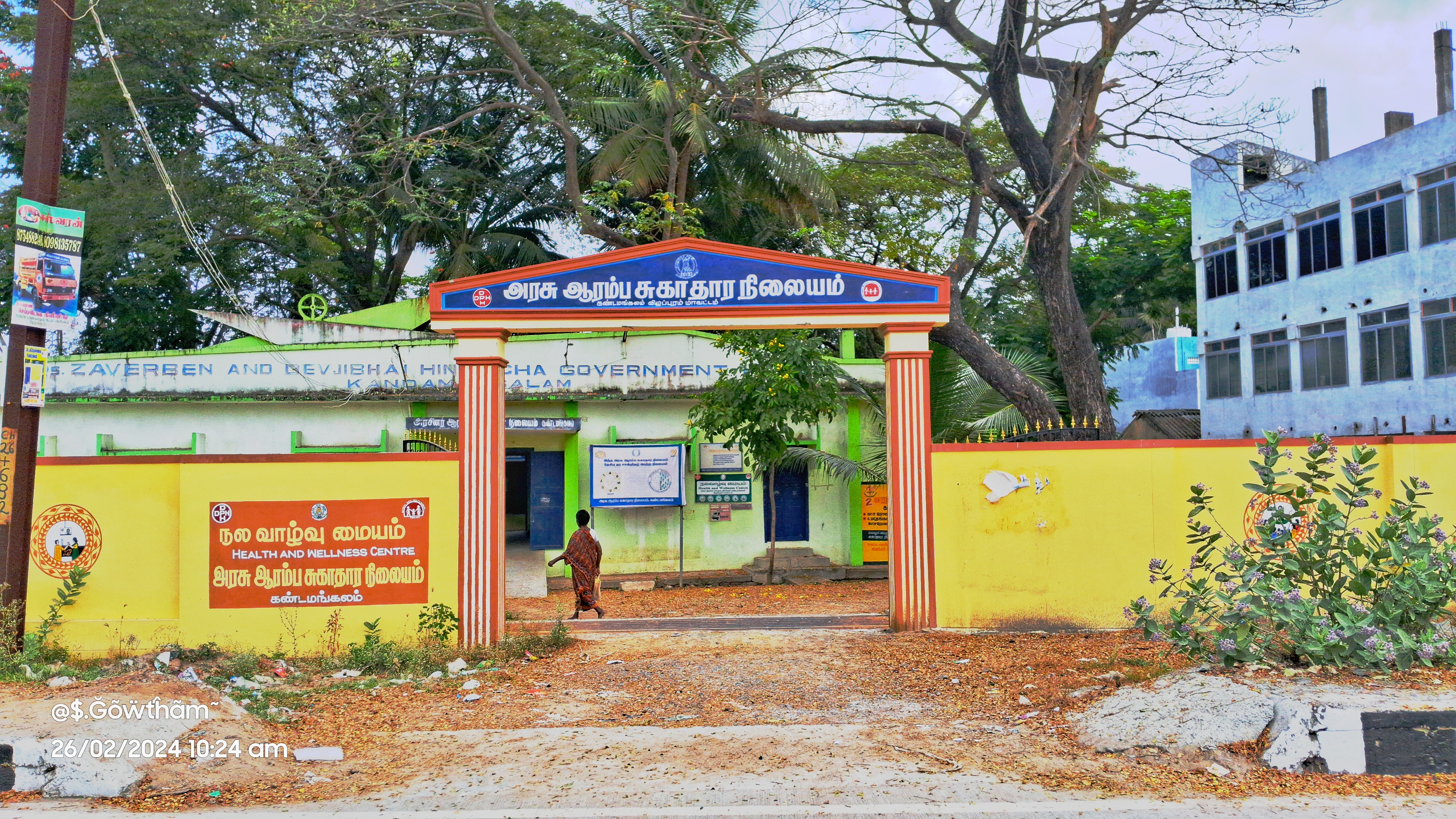
Govt hospital

- Govt hospital
- Panchayat union office
- Govt regional management office
- Village Administrative office
- Govt agricultural office
- E-seva office
- Ration shop
- B-6 police station
- TN electricity Board
- Registrar office
- Post office

=== Banks ===
- Central Bank Of India & ATM
- Indian Overseas Bank & ATM
- The Villupuram District Central Co-operative Bank Limited

=== Marriage Halls ===
- Valli marriage hall
- Krishnalaya marriage hall
- keerthisri marriage hall
- Jeeva marriage hall
- K.R.S marriage hall
- M.B marriage hall

=== Cinemas ===
- Sri Venkateshwara theatre

== Life ==
People here have access to hospital facilities (Primary Health Centre, Sri Venkateshwaraa Medical College Hospital and Research Centre, Sri Manakula Vinayagar Medical College and Hospital), schools, etc.

== Kandamangalam Assembly constituency ==
Kandamangalam was an assembly constituency from 1967 to 2006. Later, during the 2008 reshuffle, this constituency was abolished and replaced by Vanur constituency.

| Year | Winner | Party |
|---|---|---|
| 1967 | M. Raman | Dravida Munnetra Kazhagam |
| 1971 | M. Raman | Dravida Munnetra Kazhagam |
| 1977 | M. Kannan | All India Anna Dravida Munnetra Kazhagam |
| 1980 | M. Kannan | Dravida Munnetra Kazhagam |
| 1984 | V. Subramaniyan | All India Anna Dravida Munnetra Kazhagam |
| 1989 | S. Alaguvelu | Dravida Munnetra Kazhagam |
| 1991 | V. Subramanian | Dravida Munnetra Kazhagam |
| 1996 | S. Alaguvelu | Dravida Munnetra Kazhagam |
| 2001 | V. Subramanian | Dravida Munnetra Kazhagam |
| 2006 | S. Pushparaj | Dravida Munnetra Kazhagam |

== Climate ==
The climate of Kandamangalam is classified by the Köppen climate classification as tropical wet and dry, similar to that of coastal Pondicherry. Summer lasts from April to early June, when maximum temperatures may reach 41 °C (106 °F). The average maximum temperature is 36 °C (97 °F). Minimum temperatures are in the order of 28–32 °C (82–90 °F). This is followed by a period of high humidity and occasional thundershowers from June until September.

The northeast monsoon sets in during the middle of October, and Kandamangalam gets the bulk of its annual rainfall during the period from October to December. The annual average rainfall is 1,355 millimetres or 53 inches. Winters are very warm, with highs of 30 °C (86 °F) and lows often dipping to around 18–20 °C (64–68 °F).

Climate data for Kandamangalam
| Month | Jan | Feb | Mar | Apr | May | Jun | Jul | Aug | Sep | Oct | Nov | Dec | Year |
|---|---|---|---|---|---|---|---|---|---|---|---|---|---|
| Mean daily maximum °C (°F) | 28.8 (83.8) | 30.6 (87.1) | 32.9 (91.2) | 34.7 (94.5) | 37.1 (98.8) | 37.1 (98.8) | 34.5 (94.1) | 34.8 (94.6) | 34.2 (93.6) | 32.0 (89.6) | 29.5 (85.1) | 28.2 (82.8) | 32.9 (91.2) |
| Mean daily minimum °C (°F) | 20.4 (68.7) | 20.8 (69.4) | 22.7 (72.9) | 25.6 (78.1) | 27.0 (80.6) | 26.9 (80.4) | 25.9 (78.6) | 25.3 (77.5) | 24.9 (76.8) | 22.1 (71.8) | 22.5 (72.5) | 21.2 (70.2) | 23.8 (74.8) |
| Average rainfall mm (inches) | 20 (0.8) | 7 (0.3) | 6 (0.2) | 16 (0.6) | 40 (1.6) | 45 (1.8) | 80 (3.1) | 149 (5.9) | 135 (5.3) | 222 (8.7) | 216 (8.5) | 110 (4.3) | 1,046 (41.1) |

== Gallery ==
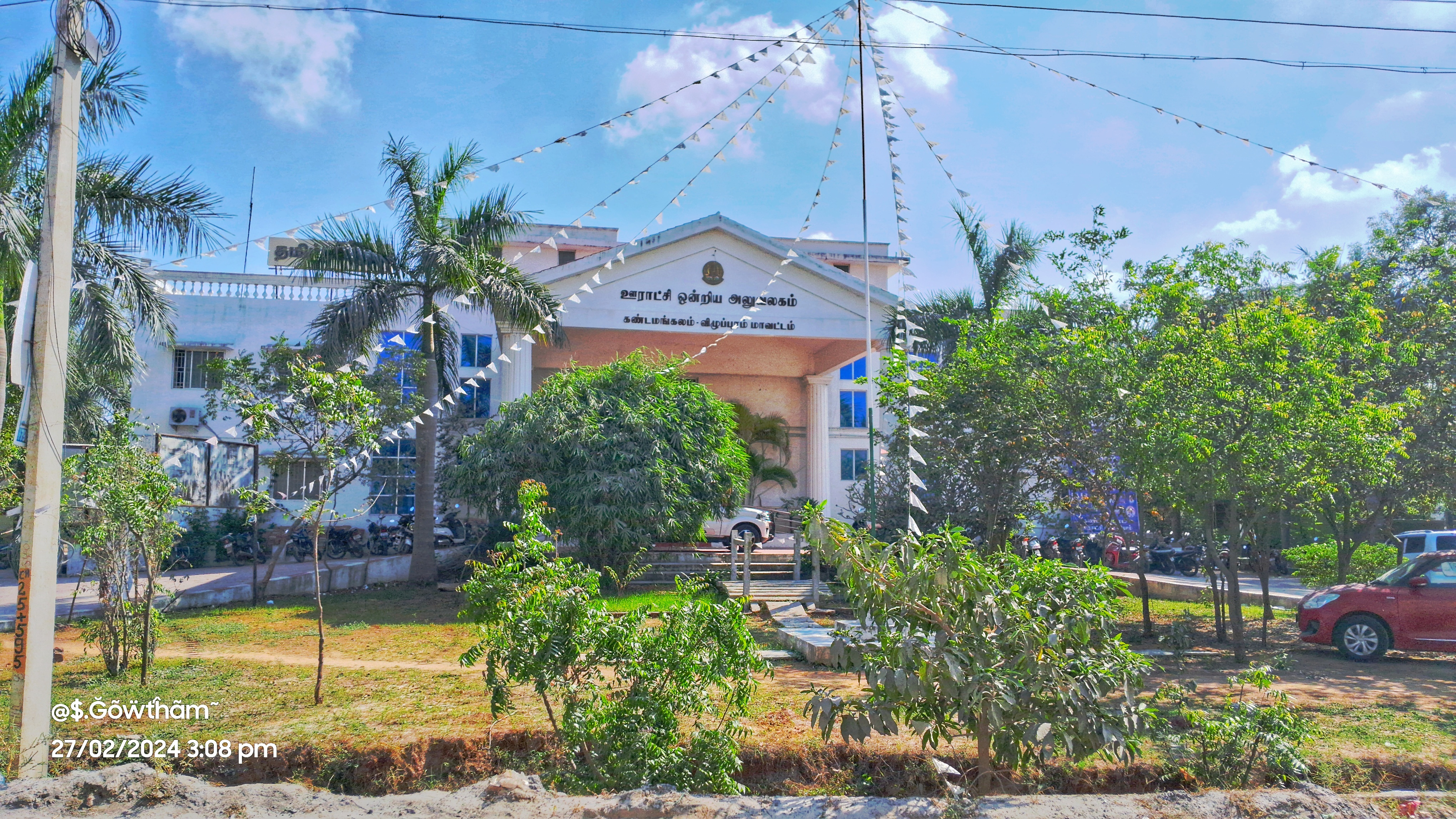
Panchayat union office

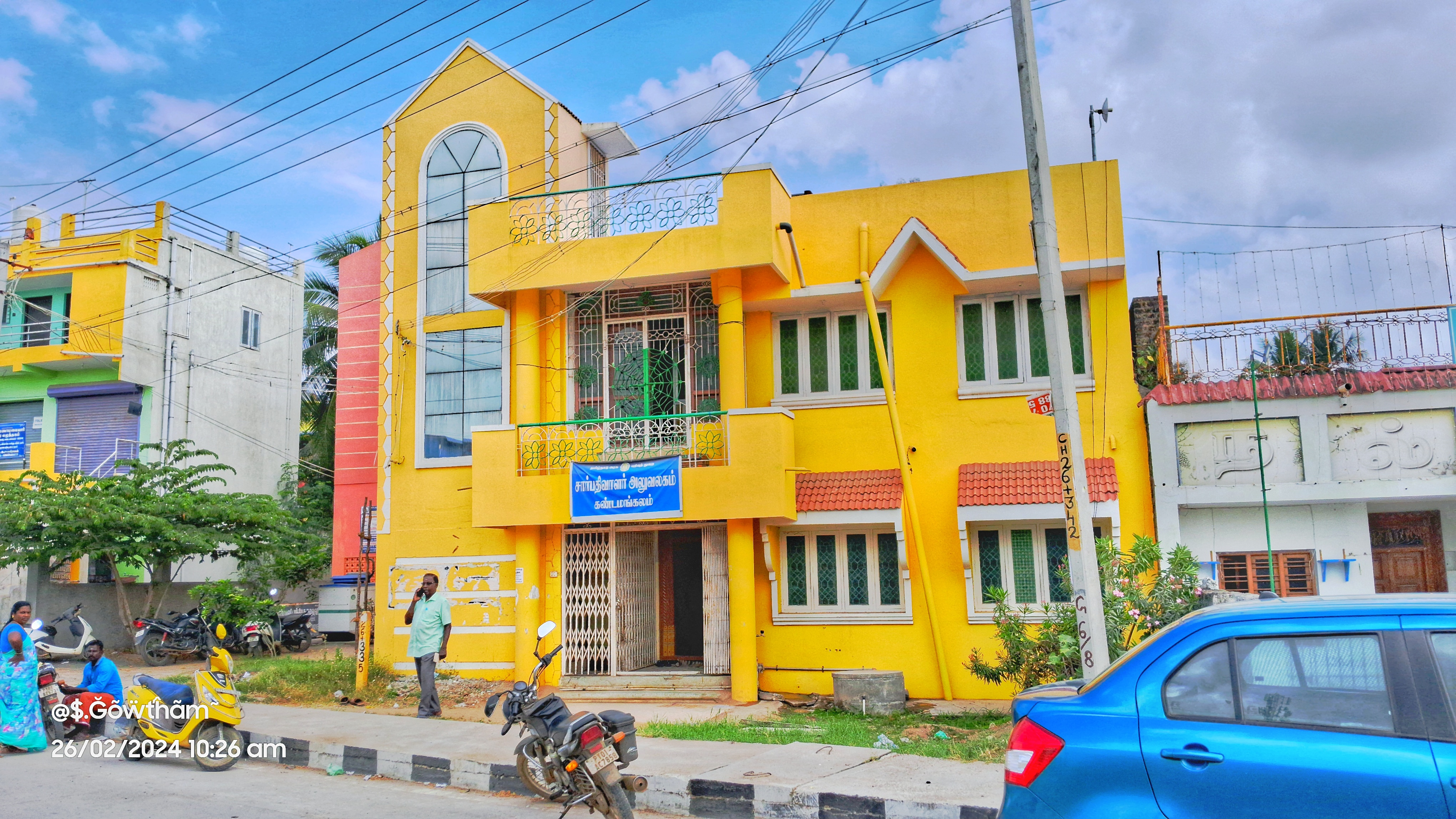
Sub Registrar office

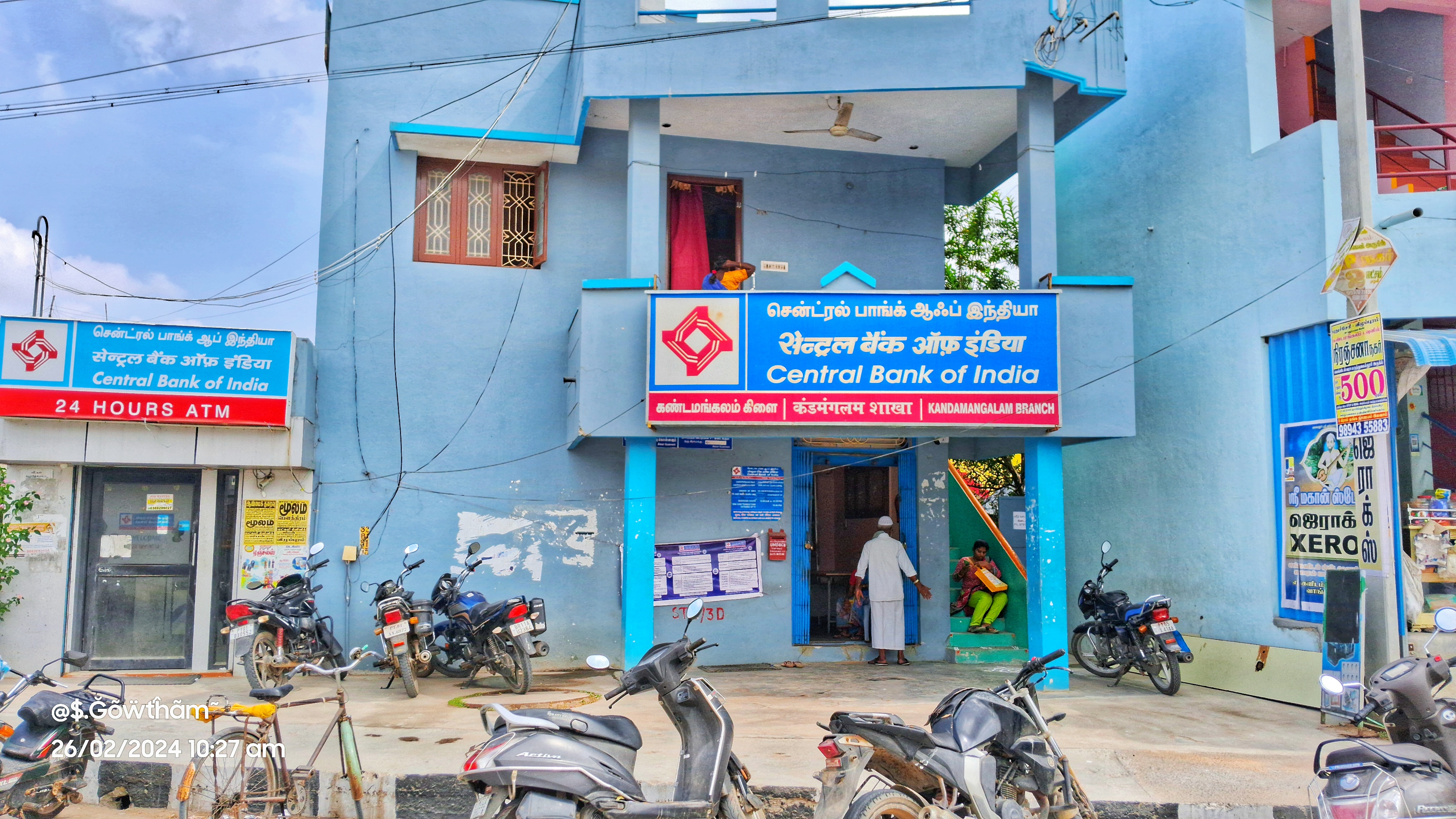
Central Bank Of India

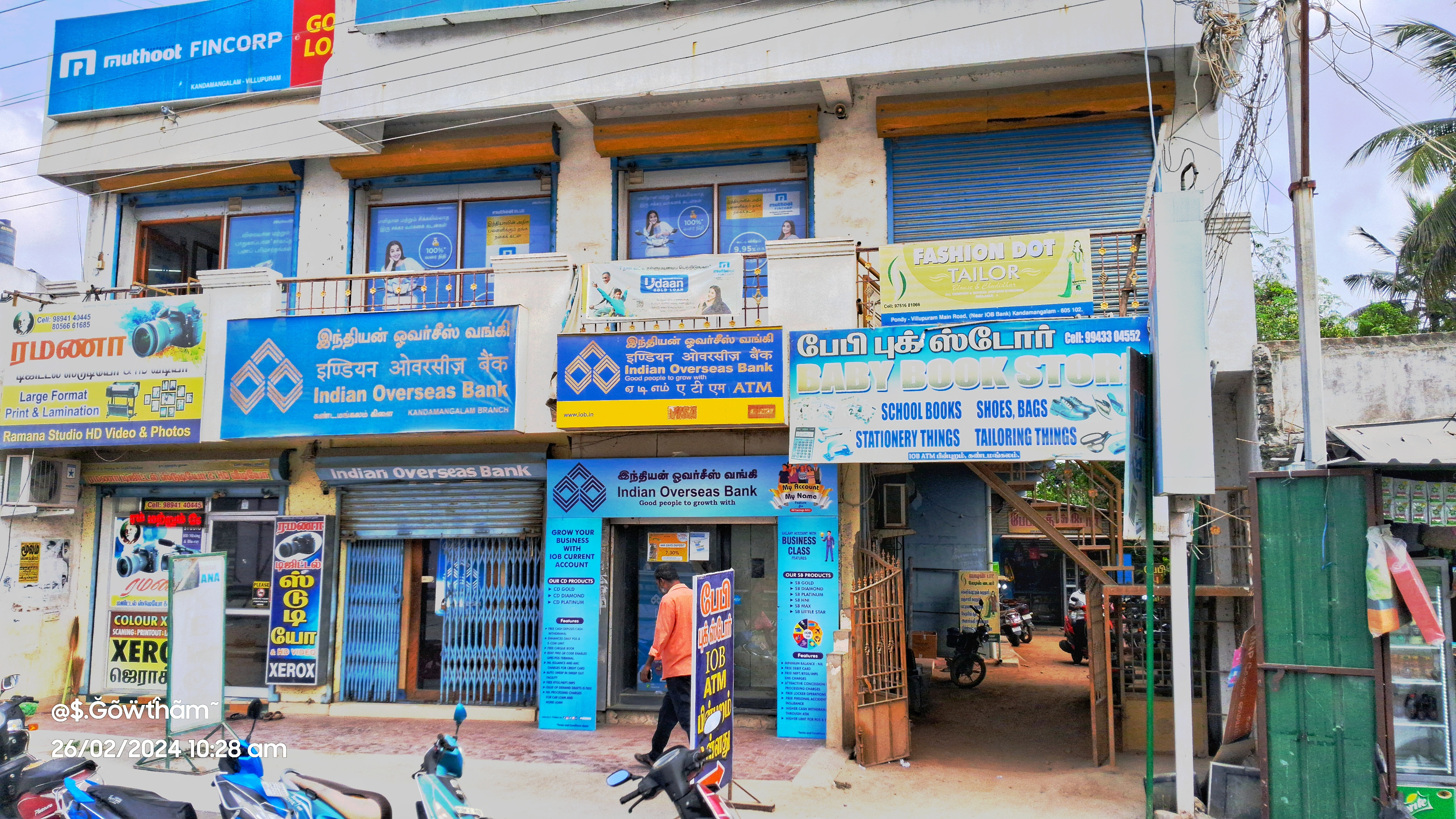
Indian Overseas Bank

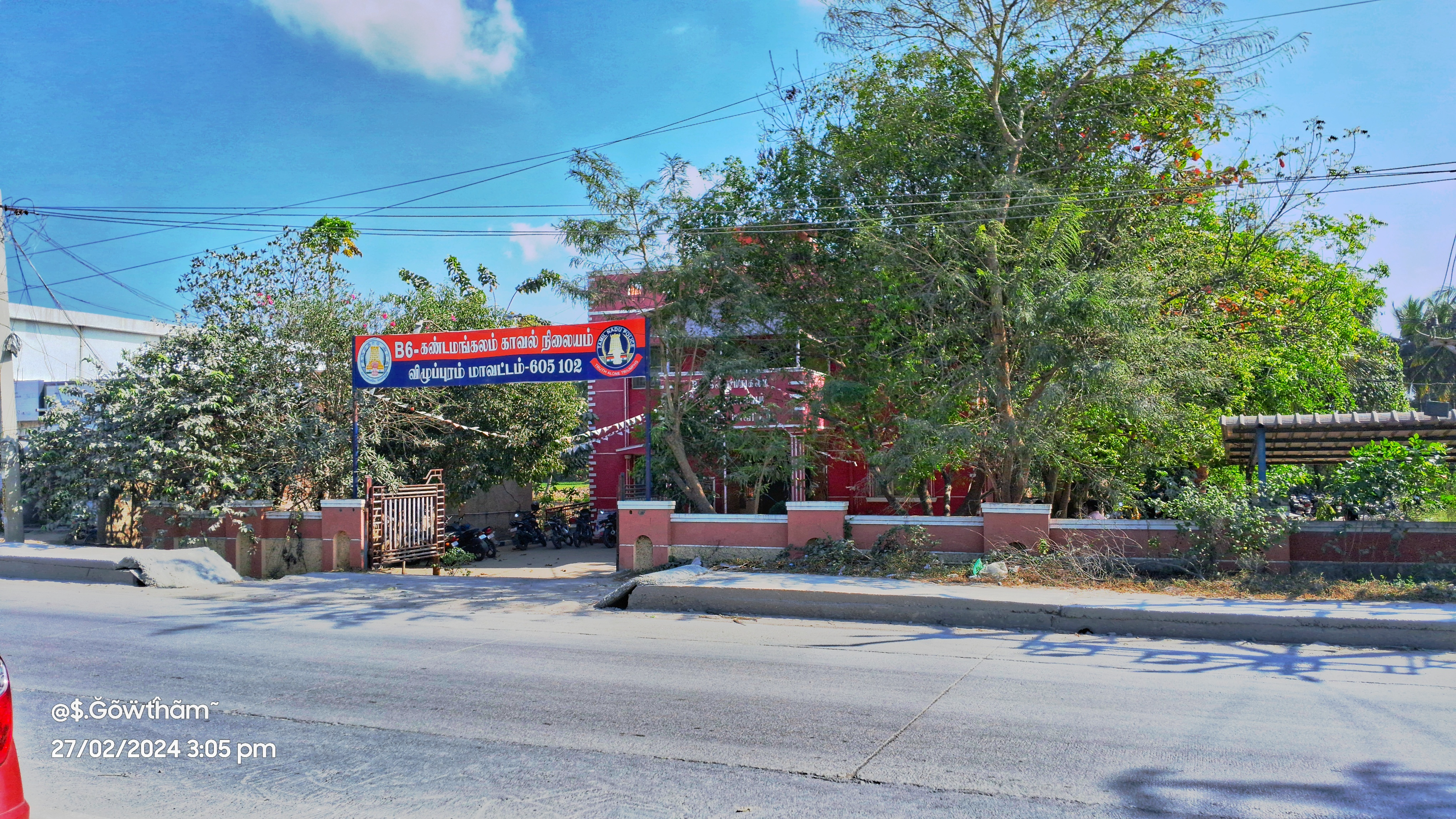
B-6 Police station

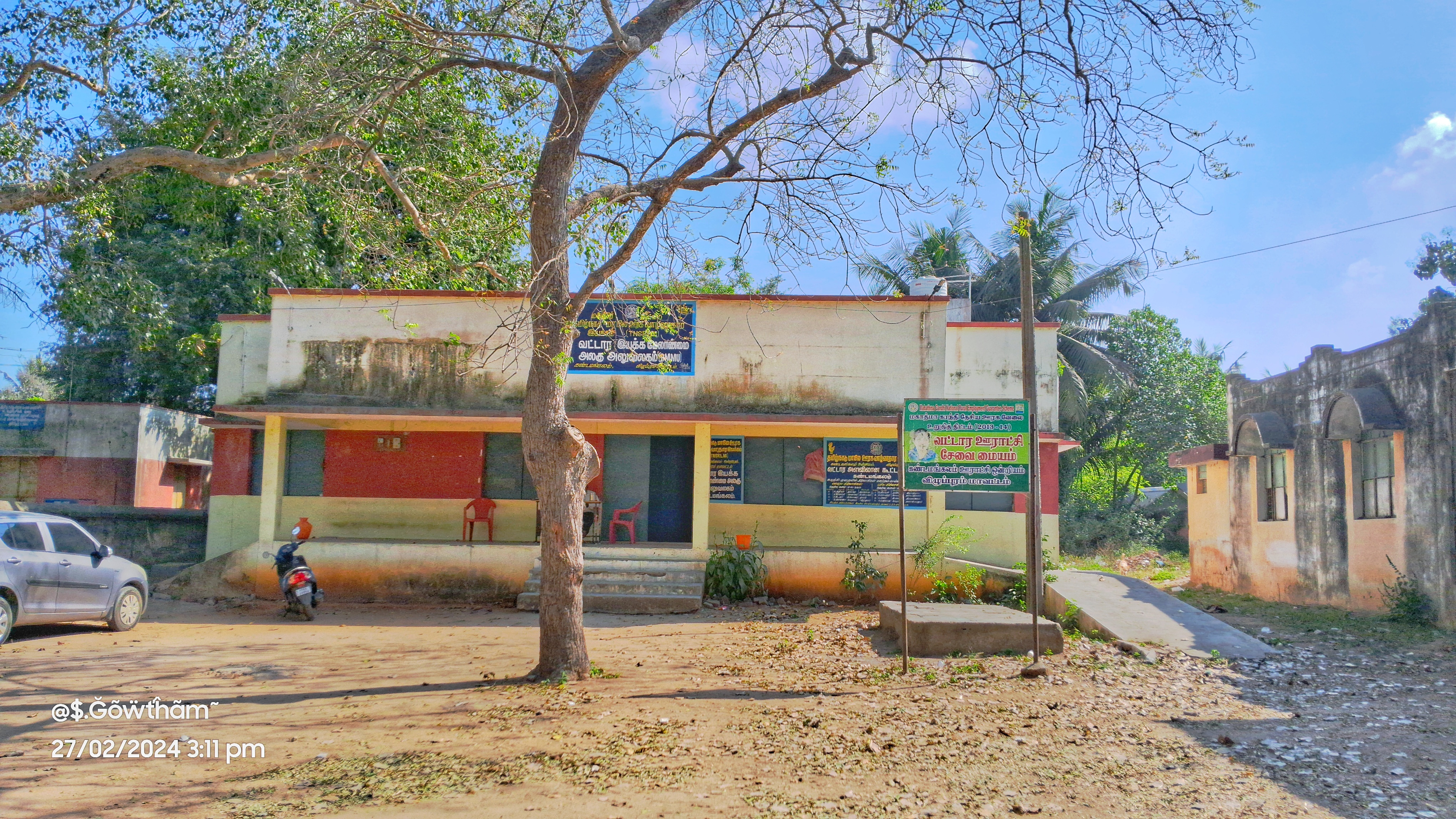
Govt regional management office

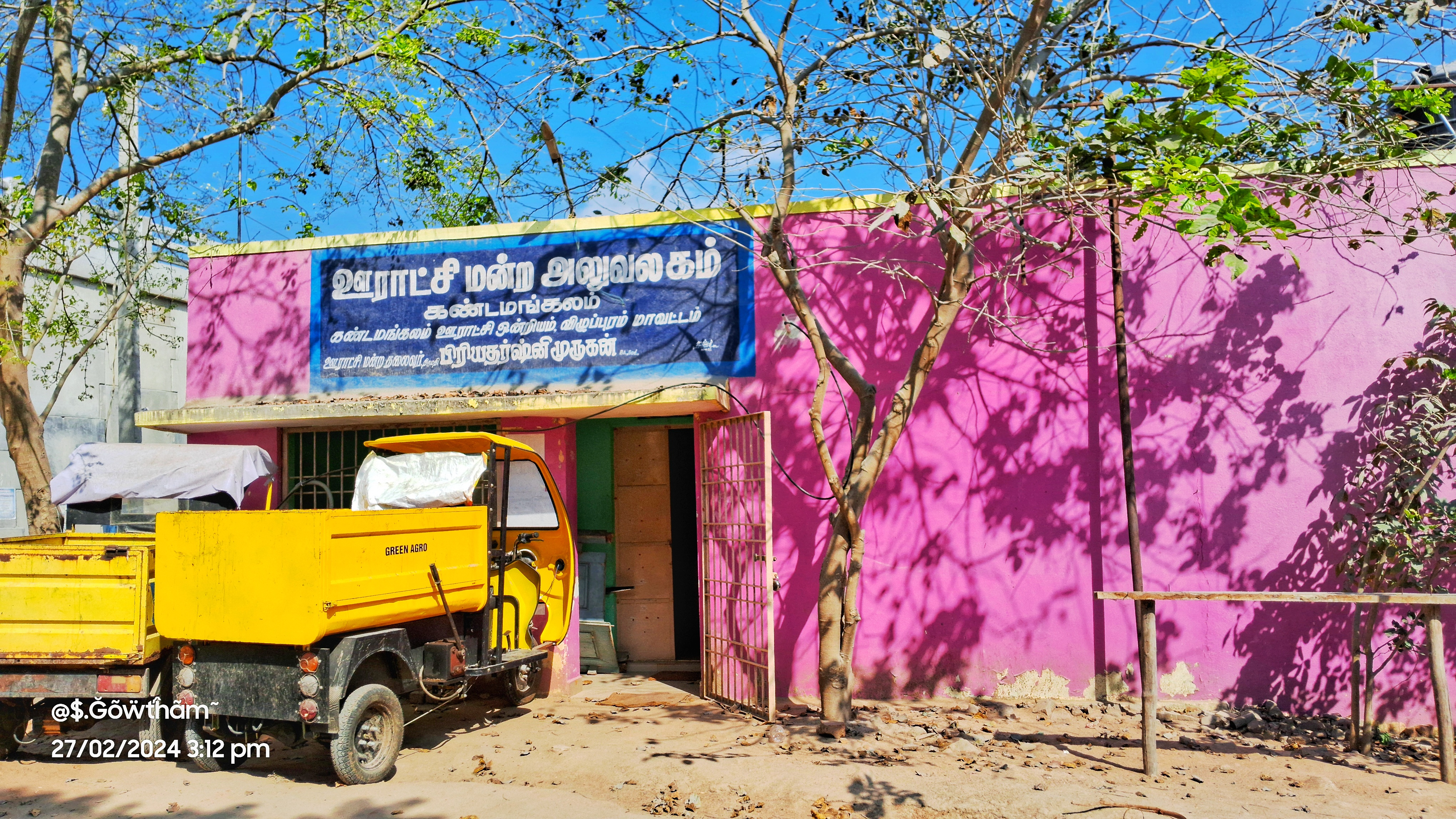
Panchayat office

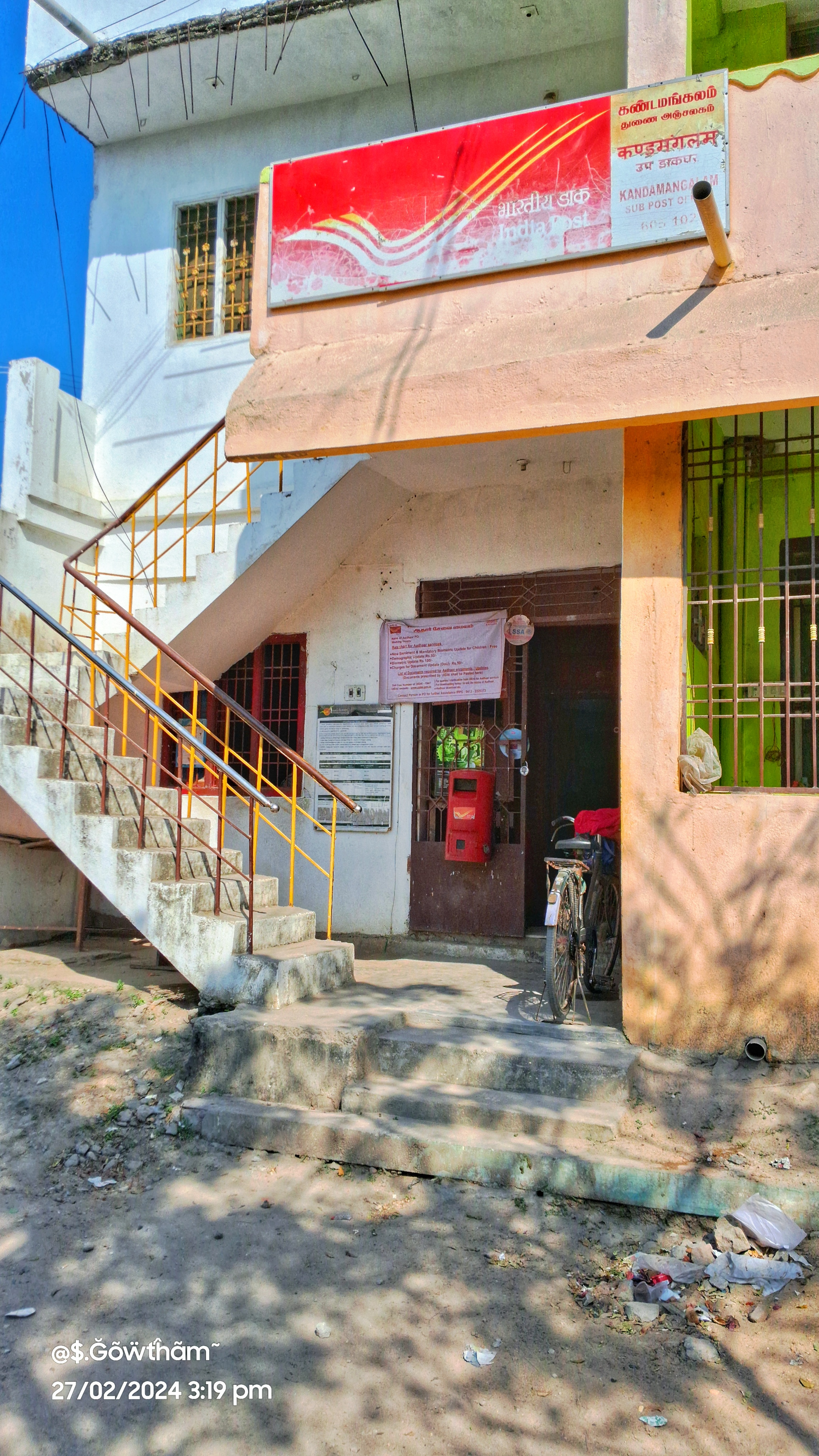
Post office

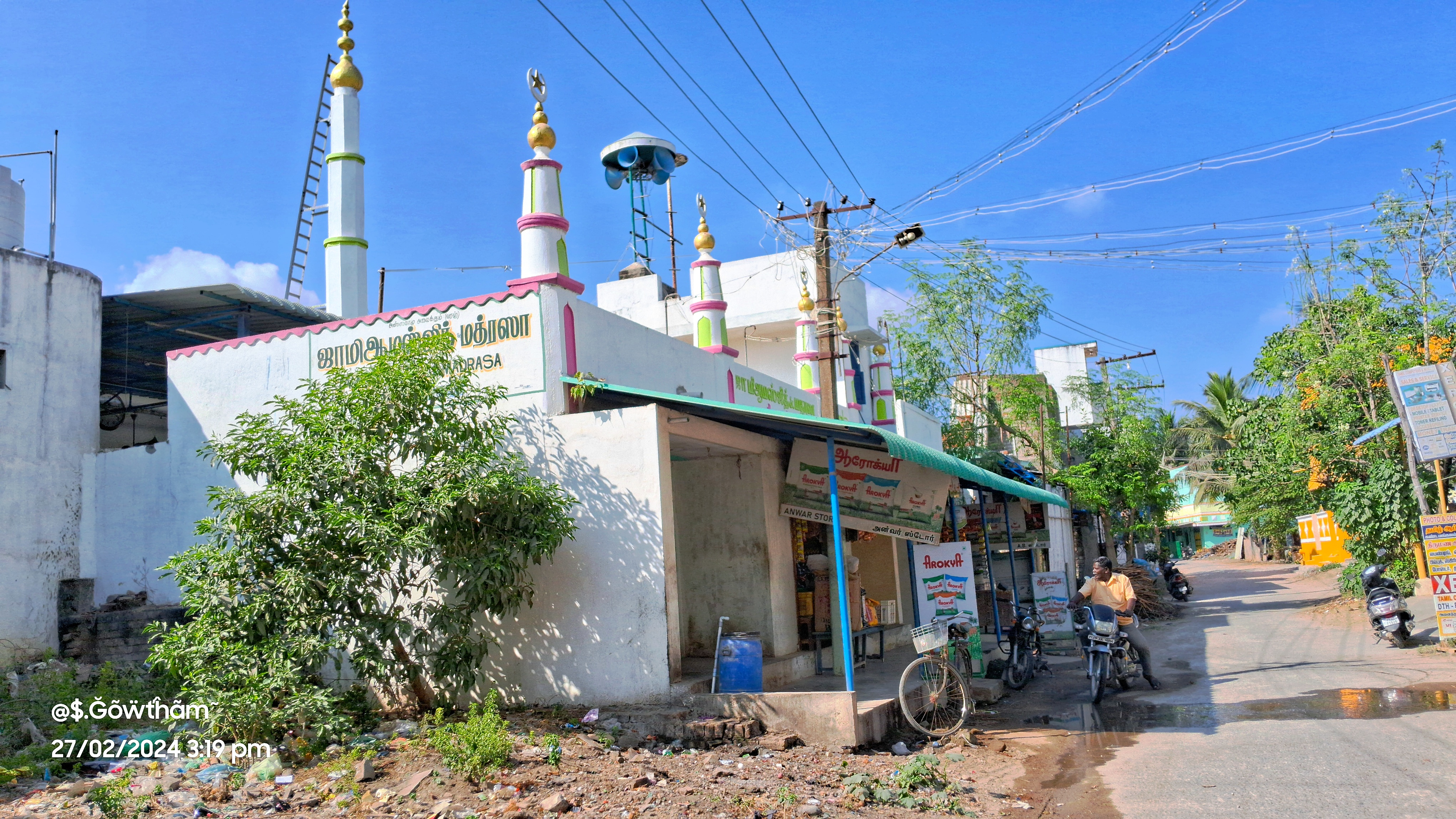
jammiah maszid

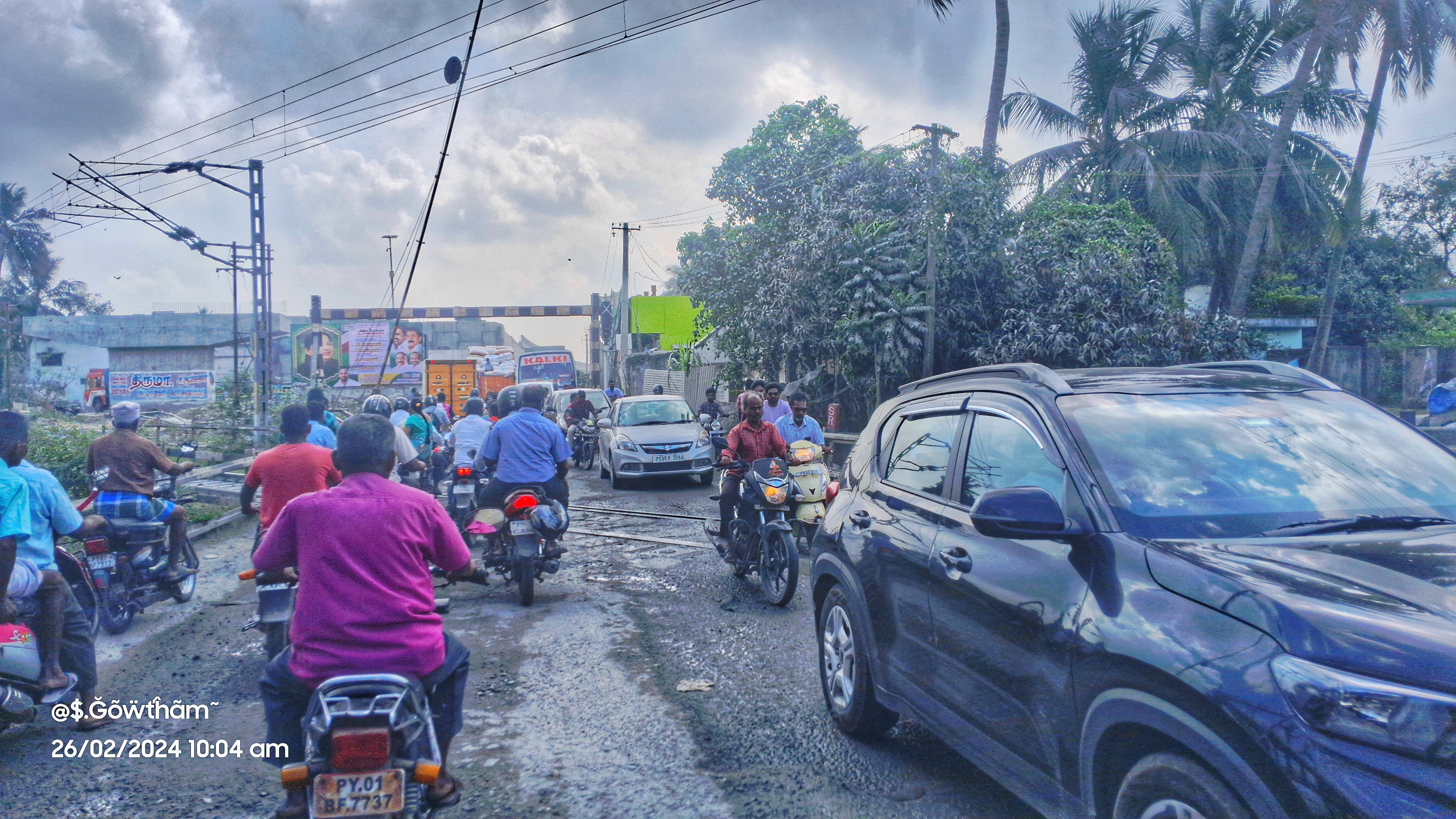
Kandamangalam railway gate

== See also ==
- Kandamangalam block
- Kandamangalam Assembly constituency
