= Balakrishna (name) =

Balakrishna or Balakrishnan is Hindu surname, derived from Bala Krishna. Notable people with the surname include:

== Balakrishna ==
- Balakrishna (Kannada actor) (1913–1995)
- Balakrishna Bhagwant Borkar (1910–1984) a poet from Goa, India
- Nandamuri Balakrishna (born 1960), Indian film actor
- Rasamayi Balakrishna, Indian singer, poet and political activist

== Balakrishnan ==
- A. G. Balakrishnan, Indian politician
- Ajit Balakrishnan, Indian entrepreneur and business executive
- A. V. Balakrishnan (Arun V. Balakrishnan) (1922–2015), American applied mathematician and professor
- C. Balakrishnan (1918–1997), Indian plastic surgeon
- C. N. Balakrishnan (1934–2018), Indian politician
- C. V. Balakrishnan (born 1952), Indian writer
- David Balakrishnan (born 1954) American founder of the Turtle Island Quartet
- Gopal Balakrishnan, American professor and editor
- Hari Balakrishnan, American professor of engineering and computer science at MIT
- Jennifer Balakrishnan, American mathematician
- Kalpathy Balakrishnan, Indian percussionist
- bKamala Rani Balakrishnan, Singaporean criminal
- Kavitha Balakrishnan (born 1976), Indian poet, art critic, and contemporary art researcher
- K. Balakrishnan (CPI-M), Indian communist politician
- K. Balakrishnan (Kesavan Balakrishnan) (1925–984), Indian politician, writer and editor
- K. Balakrishnan (Tamil Nadu), Indian communist politician
- K. G. Balakrishnan (Konakuppakatil Gopinathan Balakrishnan) (born 1945), Indian Chief Justice and Chairperson of the National Human Rights Commission of India
- Kodiyeri Balakrishnan (1953–2022), Indian communist politician
- Krish (singer) (Vijay balakrishnan) (born 1977), Indian playback singer
- Madhu Balakrishnan (born 1974), Indian playback singer
- N. L. Balakrishnan, Indian still photographer and actor
- P. K. Balakrishnan (1926–1991), Indian novelist, critic and historian
- Radhika Balakrishnan, American human rights advocate
- Ranjith (director) (Ranjith Balakrishnan) (born 1964), Indian film director, screenwriter, producer and actor
- R. Balki (R. Balakrishnan), Indian advertiser, filmmaker, and director
- S. Balakrishnan (composer) (1948–2019), Indian film score composer and music director
- S. Balakrishnan (Modakurichi MLA), Indian politician
- S. Balakrishnan (Mudukulathur MLA), Indian politician
- S. K. Balakrishnan (1935–2001), Indian politician
- S. N. Balakrishnan, University chancellor
- V. Balakrishnan (disambiguation), several people
- Vivian Balakrishnan (born 1961), Singaporean government bureaucrat

== See also ==
- 16116 Balakrishnan, a main-belt asteroid
