= Vanur =

Vanur may refer to:

- Vanur taluk
- Vanur (state assembly constituency)
- Vanur block
