= C. Balakrishnan =

C. Balakrishnan may refer to:

- C. Balakrishnan (plastic surgeon) (1918–1997), Indian plastic surgeon
- C. Balakrishnan (mountaineer) (died 2007), Indian mountaineer

== See also ==
- C. V. Balakrishnan (born 1952), Indian writer of Malayalam literature
- C. N. Balakrishnan (1934–2018), Indian politician
