= N. Ganapathy =

N. Ganapathy may refer to:

- N. Ganapathy (Thanjavur), Indian politician from Thanjavur district, Tamil Nadu, India
- N. Ganapathy (Viluppuram), Indian politician from Viluppuram district, Tamil Nadu, India
