= M. Chakrapani =

Indian politician

Member of the Tamil Nadu Legislative Assembly
- In office 16 May 2016 – 6 May 2026
- Preceded by: I. Janagiraman
- Succeeded by: Goutham Dravidamani
- Constituency: Vanur

Personal details
- Born: 3 October 1954 (age 72) Vanur, Madras State, India (present-day Viluppuram, Tamil Nadu)
- Party: All India Anna Dravida Munnetra Kazhagam
- Parent: E. Murugesan (father)

Murugesan Chakrapani is an Indian politician. He is a member of the All India Anna Dravida Munnetra Kazhagam party. He was elected as a member of Tamil Nadu Legislative Assembly from Vanur Constituency in 2016 and May 2021.

== Electoral performance ==
2021 Tamil Nadu Legislative Assembly election: Vanur
Party	Candidate	Votes	%	±%
AIADMK	M. Chakrapani	92,219	50.99%	+14.21
VCK	Vanni Arasu	70,492	38.98%	New
NTK	M. Latchoumy	8,587	4.75%	New
DMDK	P. M. Ganapathi	5,460	3.02%	New
MNM	M. Sandoshkumar	2,500	1.38%	New
NOTA	NOTA	1,363	0.75%	−0.07
Margin of victory		21,727	12.01%	6.15%
Turnout		180,845	79.83%	1.00%
Rejected ballots		209	0.12%	
Registered electors		226,539		
AIADMK hold		Swing	14.21%	

2016 Tamil Nadu Legislative Assembly election: Vanur
Party	Candidate	Votes	%	±%
AIADMK	M. Chakrapani	64,167	36.79%	−19.2
DMK	R. Mydili	53,944	30.93%	−9.22
PMK	P. Sankar	27,240	15.62%	New
VCK	D. Ravikumar	23,873	13.69%	New
BJP	D. Thiruselvakumar	1,716	0.98%	+0.03
NOTA	NOTA	1,430	0.82%	New
Margin of victory		10,223	5.86%	−9.98%
Turnout		174,428	78.83%	−2.09%
Registered electors		221,269		
AIADMK hold		Swing	-19.20%	
