= Balkrishna (disambiguation) =

Balkrishna may refer to:

- Balakrishna, the Hindu god Krishna in his childhood form
- Balakrishna (name), an Indian male given name
  - Balkrishna (born 1972), an Indian businessman
  - Nandamuri Balakrishna or Balakrishna (born 1960), Indian actor and film producer in Telugu cinema and a politician
  - T. N. Balakrishna or Balakrishna (1913–1995), Indian actor in Kannada in cinema
- Balkrishna Industries, an Indian tire manufacturing company
