= D. Gowtham =

Indian politician (born 1994)

Dravidamani Gowtham (born 1994) is an Indian politician from Tamil Nadu. He is a member of the Tamil Nadu Legislative Assembly from Vanur Assembly constituency, which is reserved for Scheduled Caste community in Viluppuram district, representing the Dravida Munnetra Kazhagam.

== Early life and education ==
Gowtham from Vanur, Viluppuram district, Tamil Nadu. He is the son of Dravidamani. He completed his B.E (Civil) at Anna University in 2017. He declared assets worth Rs.5 crore in his affidavit to the Election Commission of India.

== Career ==
Gowtham won the Vanur Assembly constituency representing the DMK in the 2026 Tamil Nadu Legislative Assembly election. He polled 68,873 votes and defeated his nearest rival, P. Suresh of the Tamilaga Vettri Kazhagam by a margin of 7,034 votes.
