= Murari Mohan Mukherjee =

Plastic surgeon

Murari Mohan Mukherjee (30 December 1914 – 26 July 1988) was an Indian plastic surgeon from Kolkata, West Bengal, India.

== Early life and education ==
He was born at his maternal uncle's house in Bhagalpur, Bihar and Orissa Province, though his family was native to Chuchura in Hooghly district of Bengal Presidency. After passing his matriculation locally from Shib Chandra Som Training Academy, Chuchura in 1931, he did his intermediate from Presidency College, Calcutta, followed by a MBBS degree from Medical College Calcutta, in 1939 and MS (Gen Surgery), from the University of Calcutta in 1949. He underwent Plastic surgical training in England under Sir Harold Gillies and Thomas Pomfret Kilner. He cleared his fellowship examinations from the Royal College of Surgeons of England and the Royal College of Surgeons of Edinburgh and returned to Kolkata to practice plastic surgery in November, 1951.

== Career ==
He started the first independent department of Plastic Surgery in India at the IPGMER and SSKM Hospital (formerly Presidency General Hospital) in Kolkata in 1956.

== Contemporary departments of Plastic Surgery in India ==
In 1945 (end of WW2), two Indian maxillofacial surgical units were established: No. l unit at Kirkee/Khadki in Pune District under G. M. FitzGibbon (author of Commandments of Gillies BJPS 1968) and later under Tom Gibson. No. 2 unit was at Secunderabad under Eric Peet. Capt C. Balakrishnan returned from the UK in 1950 and joined Government Medical College, Nagpur as a lecturer and was instrumental in starting the second independent Department of Plastic Surgery in the country at the Medical College Hospital, Nagpur, in 1958.
