= C. B. Geetha =

Indian politician

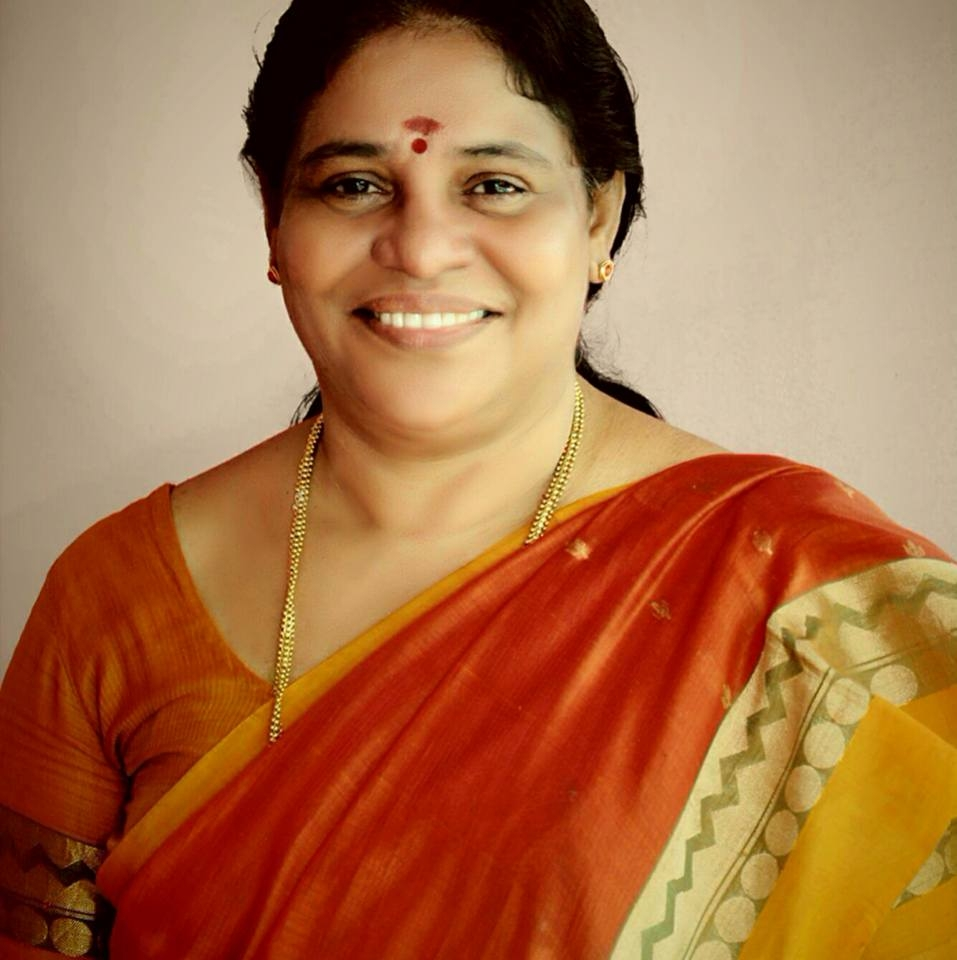

Chairperson, State Cooperative Insurance Society
- Incumbent
- Assumed office 03/2020

President, Thrissur District Mahila Cooperative Society
- Incumbent
- Assumed office 07/2014

Municipal Councillor, Olari Ward, Thrissur Corporation
- In office 11/2015–12/2020

General Secretary, Thrissur District Congress Committee, Thrissur
- Incumbent
- Assumed office 2014

Town Planning Standing Committee Chairman, Thrissur Corporation
- In office 06/2019–12/2020

President, Kerala Khadi & Village Industries Association, Avinissery, Thrissur
- Incumbent
- Assumed office 08/2019

Personal details
- Born: 30 May 1964 (age 62) Thrissur
- Party: Indian National Congress
- Children: Preethi Naveen, Prateek Krishna
- Parent(s): C. N. Balakrishnan, Thankamani Balakrishnan

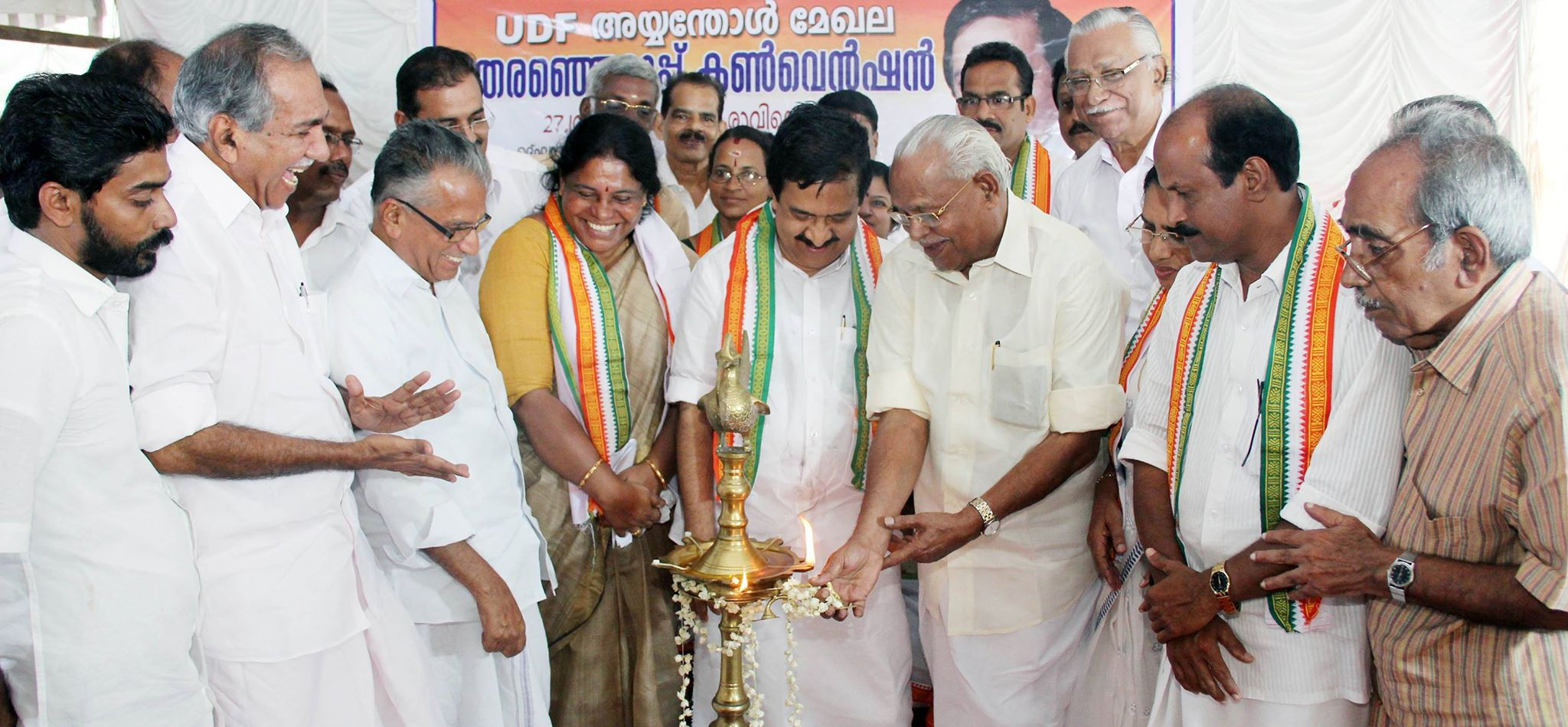
with Ramesh Chennithala, C. N. Balakrishnan, Therambil Ramakrishnan, O Abdhul RahmanKutty at Thrissur

C. Balakrishnan Geetha is an Indian politician, who was the municipal councillor of Thrissur, Kerala and also chaired as Town Planning Standing Committee Chairman for Thrissur Municipal Corporation, representing the Olarikara ward.

She is the daughter of veteran Congress leader and ex-minister C. N. Balakrishnan and a working member of Indian National Congress, serving as the General Secretary to the Thrissur District Congress Committee. She also holds various profiles, including Chairperson of State Cooperative Insurance Society, Kerala, President of Thrissur District Mahila Cooperative Society and Kerala Khadi Village Industries Association, Avinissery, Thrissur.
