= A. Marimuthu (Vanur MLA) =

Indian politician

A. Marimuthu is an Indian politician and former Member of the Legislative Assembly (MLA) of Tamil Nadu. He was elected to the Tamil Nadu legislative assembly from Vanur constituency as a Dravida Munnetra Kazhagam (DMK) candidate in the 1989 and 1996 elections. The constituency was reserved for candidates from the Scheduled Castes.

Marimuthu was among several DMK legislators charged by Tamil Nadu Police in June 2005 of having assets disproportionate to their known income. All charges were dismissed by the courts in 2015 due to lack of evidence.
