= N. Muthuvel =

Indian politician

N. Muthuvel was an Indian politician and former Member of the Legislative Assembly of Tamil Nadu. He was elected to the Tamil Nadu Legislative Assembly from Vanur constituency as a Dravida Munnetra Kazhagam candidate in 1971, and 1980 elections.
