= Kandamangalam Assembly constituency =

Coordinates: 11°54′53″N 79°40′39″E

Kandamangalam
- Former constituency for the Tamil Nadu Legislative Assembly

Constituency details
- Country: India
- Region: South India
- State: Tamil Nadu
- District: Villupuram
- Established: 1967
- Abolished: 2008
- Total electors: 1,86,058
- Reservation: None

Kandamangalam was former state assembly constituency in Viluppuram district in Tamil Nadu. It is a Scheduled Caste reserved constituency.

== Members of the Legislative Assembly ==
Year	Winner	Party
1971	M. Raman	Dravida Munnetra Kazhagam
1977	M. Kannan	All India Anna Dravida Munnetra Kazhagam
1980	M. Kannan	Dravida Munnetra Kazhagam
1984	V. Subramaniyan	Dravida Munnetra Kazhagam
1989	S. Alaguvelu	Dravida Munnetra Kazhagam
1991	V. Subramanian	Dravida Munnetra Kazhagam
1996	S. Alaguvelu	Dravida Munnetra Kazhagam
2001	V. Subramanian	Dravida Munnetra Kazhagam
2006	S. Pushparaj	Dravida Munnetra Kazhagam

== Election results ==
=== 2006 ===
2006 Tamil Nadu Legislative Assembly election: Kandamangalam
Party	Candidate	Votes	%	±%
DMK	S. Pushparaj	64,620	46.34%	8.90%
AIADMK	V. Subramanian	57,245	41.05%	−15.24%
DMDK	P. Rajachandra Sekar	12,509	8.97%	
Independent	V. Veeramuthu	1,728	1.24%	
AIVP	K. Palaraman	966	0.69%	
BSP	P. Selvam	627	0.45%	
BJP	K. Devi	531	0.38%	
Independent	S. Sudhakar	408	0.29%	
Independent	J. M. Sakthivel	330	0.24%	
Independent	B. Tamilarasan	255	0.18%	
Independent	E. Subramani	222	0.16%	
Margin of victory		7,375	5.29%	−13.56%
Turnout		139,441	74.94%	11.51%
Registered electors		186,058		
DMK gain from AIADMK		Swing	-9.95%	

=== 2001 ===
2001 Tamil Nadu Legislative Assembly election: Kandamangalam
Party	Candidate	Votes	%	±%
AIADMK	V. Subramanian	67,574	56.29%	27.33%
DMK	E. Vijayaragavan	44,946	37.44%	−16.88%
MDMK	R. Veerapandian	3,883	3.23%	−3.26%
Independent	S. Murugaiyan	2,215	1.85%	
Independent	S. Pushpa Gandhi	824	0.69%	
Independent	K. Anandan	327	0.27%	
Independent	R. Dhakshnamurthy	276	0.23%	
Margin of victory		22,628	18.85%	−6.51%
Turnout		120,045	63.44%	−5.50%
Registered electors		189,255		
AIADMK gain from DMK		Swing	1.97%	

=== 1996 ===
1996 Tamil Nadu Legislative Assembly election: Kandamangalam
Party	Candidate	Votes	%	±%
DMK	S. Alaguvelu	64,256	54.32%	30.42%
AIADMK	V. Subramanian	34,261	28.96%	−28.20%
PMK	S. Poongavanam	10,694	9.04%	
MDMK	P. Venkatachalapathy	7,686	6.50%	
Independent	M. G. Nagamani	1,008	0.85%	
Independent	K. Anandhan	393	0.33%	
Margin of victory		29,995	25.36%	−7.91%
Turnout		118,298	68.94%	2.09%
Registered electors		179,154		
DMK gain from AIADMK		Swing	-2.84%	

=== 1991 ===
1991 Tamil Nadu Legislative Assembly election: Kandamangalam
Party	Candidate	Votes	%	±%
AIADMK	V. Subramanian	60,628	57.16%	39.33%
DMK	S. Alaguvelu	25,348	23.90%	−23.04%
PMK	G. N. Sampathkumar	18,657	17.59%	
JP	Anandavalli	609	0.57%	
Independent	J. R. V. Seetharaman	347	0.33%	
Independent	A. Gurunathan	199	0.19%	
RPI	M. G. Nagamani	186	0.18%	
Independent	K. G. Varatharaj	92	0.09%	
Margin of victory		35,280	33.26%	4.16%
Turnout		106,066	66.85%	7.06%
Registered electors		166,813		
AIADMK gain from DMK		Swing	10.22%	

=== 1989 ===
1989 Tamil Nadu Legislative Assembly election: Kandamangalam
Party	Candidate	Votes	%	±%
DMK	S. Alaguvelu	40,624	46.94%	4.95%
AIADMK	M. Kannan	15,433	17.83%	−40.18%
AIADMK	V. Subramanian	14,919	17.24%	−40.77%
INC	Kasthuri Chellaram	12,577	14.53%	
Independent	M. G. Nagamani	1,685	1.95%	
Independent	V. Arumugam	413	0.48%	
Independent	M. P. Narayansamy	305	0.35%	
Independent	S. Gopala Krishnan	210	0.24%	
Independent	R. Dhasarathan	140	0.16%	
Independent	S. Rajaram	103	0.12%	
Independent	S. Shanmuagm	74	0.09%	
Margin of victory		25,191	29.11%	13.08%
Turnout		86,550	59.79%	−15.34%
Registered electors		149,262		
DMK gain from AIADMK		Swing	-11.07%	

=== 1984 ===
1984 Tamil Nadu Legislative Assembly election: Kandamangalam
Party	Candidate	Votes	%	±%
AIADMK	V. Subramanian	53,211	58.01%	8.53%
DMK	S. Alaguvelu	38,514	41.99%	
Margin of victory		14,697	16.02%	12.63%
Turnout		91,725	75.12%	22.86%
Registered electors		129,419		
AIADMK hold		Swing	8.53%	

=== 1980 ===
1980 Tamil Nadu Legislative Assembly election: Kandamangalam
Party	Candidate	Votes	%	±%
AIADMK	M. Kannan	34,368	49.49%	10.77%
INC	P. Madhavan	32,011	46.09%	
JP	V. Dasarathan	1,897	2.73%	
Independent	G. Nagamani	765	1.10%	
Independent	Kanthimathi	409	0.59%	
Margin of victory		2,357	3.39%	0.26%
Turnout		69,450	52.27%	−5.84%
Registered electors		134,779		
AIADMK hold		Swing	10.77%	

=== 1977 ===
1977 Tamil Nadu Legislative Assembly election: Kandamangalam
Party	Candidate	Votes	%	±%
AIADMK	M. Kannan	25,403	38.71%	
DMK	S. Alaguvelu	23,349	35.58%	−21.75%
JP	V. Dasarathan	10,006	15.25%	
CPI	P. Rangaswamy	3,711	5.66%	
Independent	K. Munian	1,769	2.70%	
Independent	M. Raman	1,381	2.10%	
Margin of victory		2,054	3.13%	−17.58%
Turnout		65,619	58.11%	−10.80%
Registered electors		115,036		
AIADMK gain from DMK		Swing	-18.62%	

=== 1971 ===
1971 Tamil Nadu Legislative Assembly election: Kandamangalam
Party	Candidate	Votes	%	±%
DMK	M. Raman	32,293	57.33%	1.50%
INC	P. P. Mathavan	20,628	36.62%	−7.55%
Independent	K. Munian	3,408	6.05%	
Margin of victory		11,665	20.71%	9.05%
Turnout		56,329	68.91%	−7.24%
Registered electors		91,603		
DMK hold		Swing	1.50%	

=== 1967 ===
1967 Madras Legislative Assembly election: Kandamangalam
Party	Candidate	Votes	%	±%
DMK	M. Raman	35,617	55.83%	
INC	M. S. Saraswathi	28,180	44.17%	
Margin of victory		7,437	11.66%	
Turnout		63,797	76.15%	
Registered electors		87,283		
DMK win (new seat)				

== See also ==
- Kandamangalam block
- Kandamangalam
