= Kandamangalam block =

Coordinates: 11°54′53″N 79°40′39″E

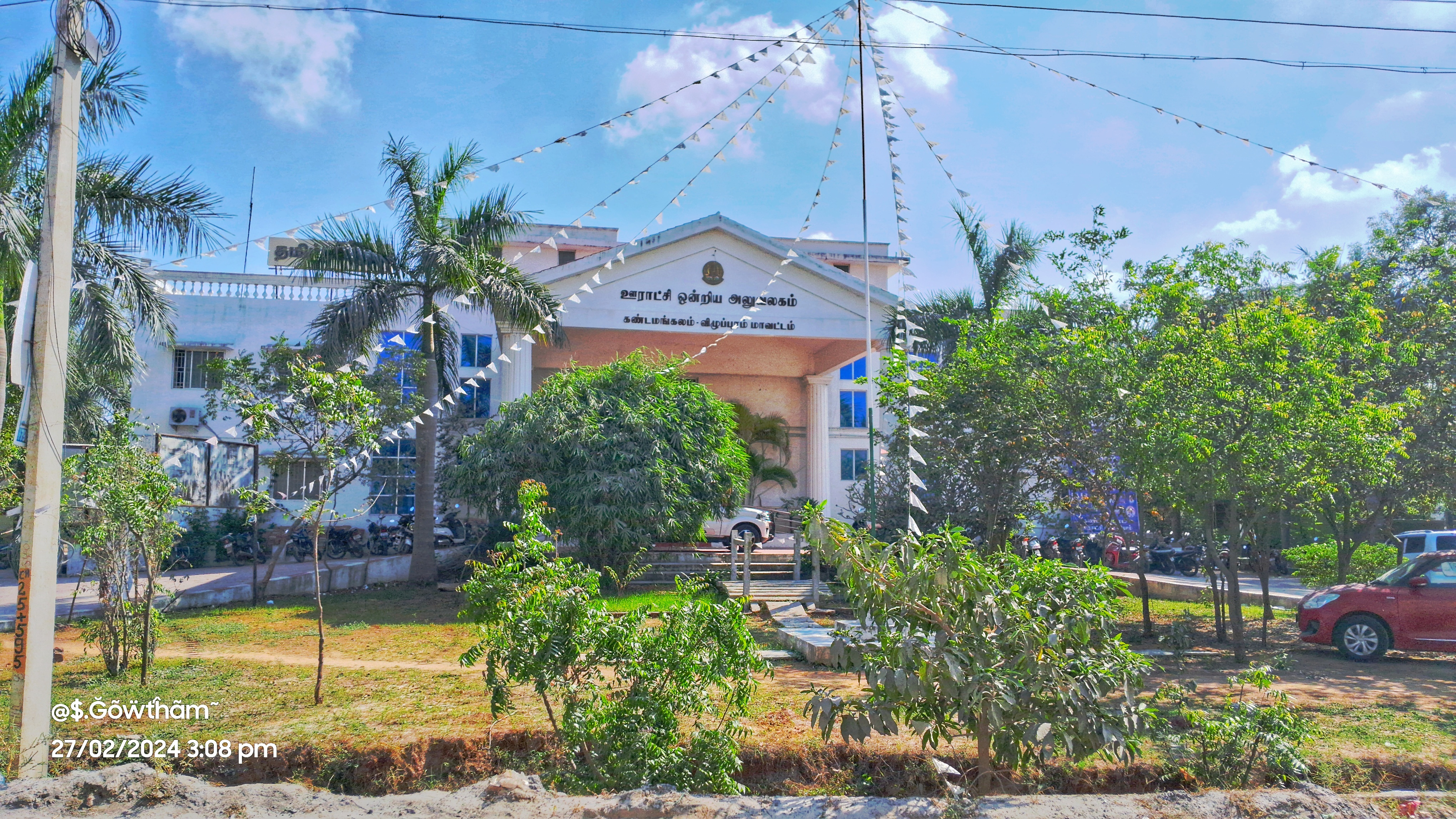
Kandamangalam panchayat union office

The Kandamangalam block is a revenue block in the Viluppuram district of Tamil Nadu, India. It has a total of 45 panchayat villages. It is located at about 15 km from Puducherry Main city. All the four sides are surrounded by Puducherry. It has important administrative offices like Block Development Office, Revenue Inspector Office, and VAO Office. Kandamangalam police station (B-6) is located at about 500 meters from Kandamangalam Bus Stop.

== Panchayat Villages ==
Details of 45 Village Panchayats in Kandamangalam block;

1. V. AGARAM
2. ARPISAMPALAYAM
3. AZHIYUR
4. CHINNABABUSAMUDRAM
5. GENGARAMPALAYAM
6. KALINJIKUPPAM
7. KALITHIRAMPATTU
8. KALLALIPATTU
9. KANDAMANGALAM
10. KODUKKUR
11. KONDUR
12. KONGAMPATTU
13. KOOTHAMPAKKAM
14. KRISHNAPURAM
15. KUMULAM
16. MATHUR .V
17. MITTAMANDAGAPATTU
18. MOTCHAKULAM
19. MUTRAMPATTU
20. NAVAMALKAPAIR
21. NAVAMALMARUDHUR
22. NERKUNAM .V
23. PAKKAM
24. PAKKIRIPALAYAM
25. PALLINELIYANUR
26. PALLIPUDUPATTU
27. PALLITHENNAL
28. PANCHAMADEVI
29. PARASUREDDIPALAYAM
30. PERIYABABUSAMUDRAM
31. POOVARASANKUPPAM
32. PUDHUR .V
33. RAMPAKKAM
34. SESHANGANUR
35. SIRUVANTHADU
36. SITHALAMPATTU
37. SORAPPUR
38. SORNAVUR KEELPATHY
39. SORNAVUR MELPATHY
40. THANDAVAMOORTHYKUPPAM
41. THIRUMANGALAM
42. VADAVAMBALAM
43. VADHANUR
44. VALUDHAVUR
45. VEERANAM

== See also ==
- Kandamangalam
- Kandamangalam Assembly constituency
