= V. Balakrishnan =

V. Balakrishnan may refer to:

- V. Balakrishnan (author) (1932–2004), Malayalam writer and translator
- V. Balakrishnan (physicist) (born 1943), Indian theoretical physicist
- V. Balakrishnan (politician) (1939–2020), Indian politician

== See also ==
- Balakrishna (name)
