= Kavitha Balakrishnan =

Indian art critic, curator and artist

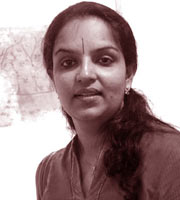
- Born: 1 June 1976 (age 50); Nadavarambu, Irinjalakuda, Thrissur district, India
- Education: M.A in Fine Art History and Aesthetics, PhD in Art history
- Occupations: Lecturer, writer, poet, researcher, painter, curator
- Spouse: M. Rajesh Aravindakshan
- Children: 1
- Writing career
- Language: Malayalam, English
- Notable work: "Adhunika Keralathile Chitrakala"
- Notable awards: the Soviet Land Nehru Award for Painting, Kerala State Govt Award from Lalit Kala Academi in 2007.
- Website: Kavitha Balakrishnan

Kavitha Balakrishnan (born 1 June 1976) is an art critic, poet, contemporary art researcher, painter and art curator. She started her teaching career as a lecturer of Art History at College of Fine Arts Trivandrum from 1998 to 1999. She later lectured at the R.L.V. College of Music and Fine Arts in Thrippunithura and as a visiting faculty at the National Institute of Fashion Technology (NIFT) in Mumbai. Balakrishnan is currently a lecturer in Art history and Aesthetics at the Govt. College of Fine Arts in Thrissur, Kerala State, India.

== Academic career ==
Balakrishnan received her master's degree in Fine Art History and Aesthetics in 1998 from Maharaja Sayajirao University of Baroda. Then she produced a research thesis on the practice of literature-oriented illustrations in Malayalam periodicals' for which she was awarded Ph.D in 2009 by Mahatma Gandhi University, Kottayam.

== Awards ==
At the age of 13 she received the Soviet Land Nehru Award for Painting while she spent the summer at the Crimean coast of the Black Sea, Ukraine (former Soviet Union) at Artek (camp)'s Inter National Young Pioneer Camp.

Her book keralathile chitrakalayude varthamanam won the state award for the best book on art in Malayalam in 2007 from Lalitha kala academy.

== Publications ==
=== Poems ===
- Angavaalulla Pakshi (Rainbow Book Publishers Chengannur, 2004)
- Njan Hajarundu.
- Kavithayude Kavithakal (INDULEKHA, 2017).

=== Art ===
- Keralathile Chitrakalayude Varthamanam, Rainbow Book Publishers, Chengannur 2007. A collection of articles on 20th-century art practices in Kerala, serialized by the periodical Madhyamam weekly in 2003.
- 'up close n personal' A series of essays locating the trajectories of significant people in Contemporary art. The column appears in a major websites for Indian Contemporary art.

== Exhibitions of paintings ==
=== Group shows ===
- ‘Hide and Seek’ Gallery OED, Kochi, 2008.
- 'L'Mechine' Gallery OED, Kochi, 2009.
- Trikana Matilakam Porulukal: Contemporary Art Project, Mathilakam 2015.

=== Solo shows ===
1.Contemporary Art gallery, show sponsored by Kerala Lalith kala Academy.1997.
