= S. Alaguvelu =

Indian politician

S. Alaguvelu is an Indian politician and former Member of the Legislative Assembly of Tamil Nadu. He was elected to the Tamil Nadu legislative assembly from Kandamangalam constituency as a Dravida Munnetra Kazhagam candidate in 1989 and 1996 elections. The constituency was reserved for candidates from the Scheduled Castes.
