= N. Ganapathy (Viluppuram) =

Indian politician

- Occupation: Politician

N. Ganapathy is an Indian politician and incumbent Member of the Legislative Assembly of Tamil Nadu. He was elected to the Tamil Nadu legislative assembly from Vanur constituency as an Anna Dravida Munnetra Kazhagam candidate in 2001, and 2006 elections.
