= V. Subramanian =

Indian politician

V. Subramanian is an Indian politician and former Member of the Legislative Assembly of Tamil Nadu. He was elected to the Tamil Nadu legislative assembly from Kandamangalam constituency as a Dravida Munnetra Kazhagam candidate in 1984, 1991, and 2001 elections.
