= I. Janagiraman =

Indian politician

I. Janagiraman (born 20 December 1952) is an Indian politician and was a member of the 14th Tamil Nadu Legislative Assembly from the Vanur constituency, which is reserved for candidates from the Scheduled Castes. He represented the All India Anna Dravida Munnetra Kazhagam party.

Janakiraman was born on 20 December 1952 in Nallavur. Married with four children, he was chairman of Vanur Union between 1984 and 1989.
