= Vanur Assembly constituency =

State Legislative Assembly Constituency in Tamil Nadu

Coordinates: 12°01′32″N 79°43′25″E

Vanur
- Constituency No. 73 for the Tamil Nadu Legislative Assembly

Constituency details
- Country: India
- Region: South India
- State: Tamil Nadu
- District: Villupuram
- Lok Sabha constituency: Villupuram
- Established: 1962
- Total electors: 2,09,885
- Reservation: SC

Member of Legislative Assembly
- 17th Tamil Nadu Legislative Assembly
- Incumbent Gautham Dravidamani
- Party: DMK
- Alliance: SPA
- Elected year: 2026

Vanur is a state assembly constituency in Viluppuram district of Tamil Nadu, India. Its State Assembly Constituency number is 73. The seat is reserved for candidates from the Scheduled Castes and comprises Vanur taluk and a portion of Viluppuram taluk. It is a part of Viluppuram Lok Sabha constituency for national elections to the Parliament of India. It is one of the 234 State Legislative Assembly Constituencies in Tamil Nadu, in India.

== Members of Legislative Assembly ==
Year	Member	Political party
Madras State
1962	A. G. Balakrishna	Dravida Munnetra Kazhagam
1967	A. G. Balakrishnan	Dravida Munnetra Kazhagam
Tamil Nadu
1971	N. Muthuvel	Dravida Munnetra Kazhagam
1977	M. Paramasivan	Dravida Munnetra Kazhagam
1980	N. Muthuvel	Dravida Munnetra Kazhagam
1984	M. N. Ramajayam	All India Anna Dravida Munnetra Kazhagam
1989	A. Marimuthu	Dravida Munnetra Kazhagam
1991	S. Arumugam	All India Anna Dravida Munnetra Kazhagam
1996	A. Marimuthu	Dravida Munnetra Kazhagam
2001	N. Ganapathy	All India Anna Dravida Munnetra Kazhagam
2006	N. Ganapathy	All India Anna Dravida Munnetra Kazhagam
2011	I. Janagiraman	All India Anna Dravida Munnetra Kazhagam
2016	M. Chakrapani	All India Anna Dravida Munnetra Kazhagam
2021	M. Chakrapani	All India Anna Dravida Munnetra Kazhagam
2026	Goutham Dravidamani	Dravida Munnetra Kazhagam

== Election results ==
Vote share of winning candidates
2026	35.85%
2021	50.99%
2016	36.79%
2011	55.99%
2006	42.57%
2001	55.65%
1996	50.23%
1991	56.30%
1989	48.24%
1984	64.54%
1980	52.89%
1977	34.32%
1971	59.81%
1967	50.06%
1962	51.70%

=== 2026 ===
2026 Tamil Nadu Legislative Assembly election: Vanur
Party	Candidate	Votes	%	±%
DMK	D. Gowtham	68,873	35.85	New
TVK	Suresh P	61,839	32.19	New
AIADMK	Murugan P	54,193	28.21	▼22.78
NTK	Karikalan B	4,697	2.44	▼2.31
Margin of victory		7,034	3.66	▼8.35
Turnout		1,92,119	91.54	▲11.71
Registered electors		2,09,885		▼16,654
DMK gain from AIADMK		Swing	New	

=== 2021 ===
2021 Tamil Nadu Legislative Assembly election: Vanur
Party	Candidate	Votes	%	±%
AIADMK	M. Chakrapani	92,219	50.99%	+14.21
VCK	Vanni Arasu	70,492	38.98%	New
NTK	M. Latchoumy	8,587	4.75%	New
DMDK	P. M. Ganapathi	5,460	3.02%	New
MNM	M. Sandoshkumar	2,500	1.38%	New
NOTA	NOTA	1,363	0.75%	−0.07
Margin of victory		21,727	12.01%	6.15%
Turnout		180,845	79.83%	1.00%
Rejected ballots		209	0.12%	
Registered electors		226,539		
AIADMK hold		Swing	14.21%	

=== 2016 ===
2016 Tamil Nadu Legislative Assembly election: Vanur
Party	Candidate	Votes	%	±%
AIADMK	M. Chakrapani	64,167	36.79%	−19.2
DMK	R. Mydili	53,944	30.93%	−9.22
PMK	P. Sankar	27,240	15.62%	New
VCK	D. Ravikumar	23,873	13.69%	New
BJP	D. Thiruselvakumar	1,716	0.98%	+0.03
NOTA	NOTA	1,430	0.82%	New
Margin of victory		10,223	5.86%	−9.98%
Turnout		174,428	78.83%	−2.09%
Registered electors		221,269		
AIADMK hold		Swing	-19.20%	

=== 2011 ===
2011 Tamil Nadu Legislative Assembly election: Vanur
Party	Candidate	Votes	%	±%
AIADMK	I. Janagiraman	88,834	55.99%	+13.41
DMK	S. Pushparaj	63,696	40.14%	New
BJP	D. Vetrivendan	1,520	0.96%	+0.22
BSP	N. Ramamoorthy	1,193	0.75%	−0.09
Independent	D. Devi	1,191	0.75%	New
Independent	K. Janagiraman	1,140	0.72%	New
Margin of victory		25,138	15.84%	12.98%
Turnout		158,671	80.92%	10.90%
Registered electors		196,094		
AIADMK hold		Swing	13.41%	

=== 2006 ===
2006 Tamil Nadu Legislative Assembly election: Vanur
Party	Candidate	Votes	%	±%
AIADMK	N. Ganapathy	59,978	42.57%	−13.07
PMK	N. Soundararajan	55,942	39.71%	New
DMDK	K. Raja	19,051	13.52%	New
Independent	M. Jayapal	1,718	1.22%	New
BSP	A. Govindasamy	1,181	0.84%	New
BJP	D. Paramasivam	1,042	0.74%	New
Independent	S. Kothandaraman	912	0.65%	New
Margin of victory		4,036	2.86%	−14.50%
Turnout		140,884	70.02%	9.83%
Registered electors		201,206		
AIADMK hold		Swing	-13.07%	

=== 2001 ===
2001 Tamil Nadu Legislative Assembly election: Vanur
Party	Candidate	Votes	%	±%
AIADMK	N. Ganapathy	68,421	55.65%	+25.81
DMK	R. Mydili	47,072	38.28%	−11.95
MDMK	P. S. Velayudham	2,986	2.43%	−0.04
Independent	R. Jayaraman	2,410	1.96%	New
Independent	A. Lakshmi Kanthan	951	0.77%	New
Margin of victory		21,349	17.36%	−3.03%
Turnout		122,958	60.19%	−6.52%
Registered electors		204,268		
AIADMK gain from DMK		Swing	5.41%	

=== 1996 ===
1996 Tamil Nadu Legislative Assembly election: Vanur
Party	Candidate	Votes	%	±%
DMK	A. Marimuthu	58,966	50.23%	+28.08
AIADMK	S. P. Erasendiran	35,024	29.84%	−26.47
PMK	M. N. Eramajayam	17,855	15.21%	New
MDMK	K. Manjini	2,900	2.47%	New
BSP	K. Vijayan	746	0.64%	New
Margin of victory		23,942	20.40%	−13.75%
Turnout		117,386	66.72%	−0.15%
Registered electors		186,365		
DMK gain from AIADMK		Swing	-6.07%	

=== 1991 ===
1991 Tamil Nadu Legislative Assembly election: Vanur
Party	Candidate	Votes	%	±%
AIADMK	S. Arumugam	60,128	56.30%	+38.34
DMK	N. V. Jayaseelan	23,659	22.15%	−26.08
PMK	M. H. Ramajayam	21,081	19.74%	New
Margin of victory		36,469	34.15%	9.36%
Turnout		106,795	66.87%	6.34%
Registered electors		169,151		
AIADMK gain from DMK		Swing	8.07%	

=== 1989 ===
1989 Tamil Nadu Legislative Assembly election: Vanur
Party	Candidate	Votes	%	±%
DMK	A. Marimuthu	42,825	48.24%	+12.77
INC	C. Krishnan	20,813	23.44%	New
AIADMK	M. N. Ramajayam	15,951	17.97%	−46.57
CPI	V. Arjunan	8,273	9.32%	New
Margin of victory		22,012	24.79%	−4.28%
Turnout		88,784	60.53%	−13.04%
Registered electors		150,426		
DMK gain from AIADMK		Swing	-16.30%	

=== 1984 ===
1984 Tamil Nadu Legislative Assembly election: Vanur
Party	Candidate	Votes	%	±%
AIADMK	M. N. Ramajayam	58,196	64.54%	+18.78
DMK	A. Poopalan	31,980	35.46%	−17.43
Margin of victory		26,216	29.07%	21.93%
Turnout		90,176	73.57%	12.90%
Registered electors		130,927		
AIADMK gain from DMK		Swing	11.64%	

=== 1980 ===
1980 Tamil Nadu Legislative Assembly election: Vanur
Party	Candidate	Votes	%	±%
DMK	N. Muthuvel	38,883	52.89%	+18.58
AIADMK	M. N. Ramajayam	33,635	45.75%	+14.58
Independent	V. Kanagaraj Vanur	600	0.82%	New
Independent	A. Erusan	394	0.54%	New
Margin of victory		5,248	7.14%	4.00%
Turnout		73,512	60.67%	2.93%
Registered electors		123,245		
DMK hold		Swing	18.58%	

=== 1977 ===
1977 Tamil Nadu Legislative Assembly election: Vanur
Party	Candidate	Votes	%	±%
DMK	M. Paramasivam	21,557	34.32%	−25.49
AIADMK	A. Boopalan	19,584	31.18%	New
INC	S. Gandhidass	12,621	20.09%	−13.75
JP	A. Perumal	7,862	12.52%	New
Independent	A. Erusan	861	1.37%	New
Independent	Arulvaratharajan	332	0.53%	New
Margin of victory		1,973	3.14%	−22.83%
Turnout		62,817	57.74%	−11.05%
Registered electors		110,777		
DMK hold		Swing	-25.49%	

=== 1971 ===
1971 Tamil Nadu Legislative Assembly election: Vanur
Party	Candidate	Votes	%	±%
DMK	N. Muthuvel	34,121	59.81%	+9.75
INC	A. Venkatachalam	19,306	33.84%	−16.1
Independent	A. Erusan	3,620	6.35%	New
Margin of victory		14,815	25.97%	25.85%
Turnout		57,047	68.80%	−1.46%
Registered electors		91,533		
DMK hold		Swing	9.75%	

=== 1967 ===
1967 Madras Legislative Assembly election: Vanur
Party	Candidate	Votes	%	±%
DMK	Balakrishnan	30,023	50.06%	−1.64
INC	Velayudham	29,953	49.94%	+1.64
Margin of victory		70	0.12%	−3.28%
Turnout		59,976	70.25%	13.05%
Registered electors		88,494		
DMK hold		Swing	-1.64%	

=== 1962 ===
1962 Madras Legislative Assembly election: Vanur
Party	Candidate	Votes	%	±%
DMK	A. G. Balakrishnan	22,463	51.70%	New
INC	S. Kannana	20,987	48.30%	New
Margin of victory		1,476	3.40%	
Turnout		43,450	57.21%	
Registered electors		78,972		
DMK win (new seat)				
