= Koliyanur block =

The Koliyanur is Place Which is Located the Viluppuram district of Tamil Nadu, India. It has a total of 48 panchayat villages. Koliyanur which is a suburb of Villupuram city located 8km away. This suburb lies on 45A (Villupuram-Pondicherry), 45C (Villupuram–Thanjavur).
