= S. Pushparaj =

Indian politician

S. Pushparaj was elected to the Tamil Nadu Legislative Assembly from the Kandamangalam constituency in the 2006 election. He was a candidate of the Dravida Munnetra Kazhagam (DMK) party.
