= Vanur block =

Coordinates: 12°01′32″N 79°43′25″E

The Vanur block is a revenue block in the Viluppuram district of Tamil Nadu, India. It has a total of 65 panchayat villages.
