= C. Balakrishnan (plastic surgeon) =

Indian surgeon

Dr. Chakkiri Balakrishnan (CBK) (1918–1997) was a plastic surgeon from India (Marakkara, Madras State, present day Kerala) who was a pioneer of modern plastic surgery in India, when he established second independent Department of Plastic Surgery in India, at the Medical College Hospital, Nagpur, in 1958.

He was also one of the founding members of the Post Graduate Institute of medical education and research, Chandigarh.

A gold medalist from Madras Medical college, Capt (Dr.) C Balakrishnan was posted as a temporary commissioned officer at the No. 1 unit in 1946 (commanding officer was Thomas Gibson.

He had joined the British Indian Army as an emergency commissioned officer. After Independence in 1947, he went to England to receive further training in plastic surgery where he worked with Thomas Pomfret Kilner and Sir Harold Gillies.

Dr. C. Balakrishnan returned from the UK in 1950 and he joined Government Medical College, Nagpur as a lecturer. The second independent Department of Plastic Surgery in the country was created at the Medical College Hospital, Nagpur, in 1958 by him. The first summer conference of the Association of Plastic Surgeons of India (APSI) was held at Nagpur in 1964.

After resigning as HOD of Nagpur Dept of Plastic Surgery, he started the Department of Plastic Surgery in PGIMER, Chandigarh in 1966,

== Controversy ==
It has been erroneously stated that Dr Balakrishnan started the first independent department of Plastic surgery in India. It was actually Murari Mohan Mukherjee who started the first independent department of Plastic Surgery in India at the IPGMER and SSKM Hospital (formerly Presidency General Hospital) in Kolkata in 1956, two years before the Department started in Nagpur.
