= C. N. Balakrishnan =

Indian politician (1934–2018)

- C. N. B.
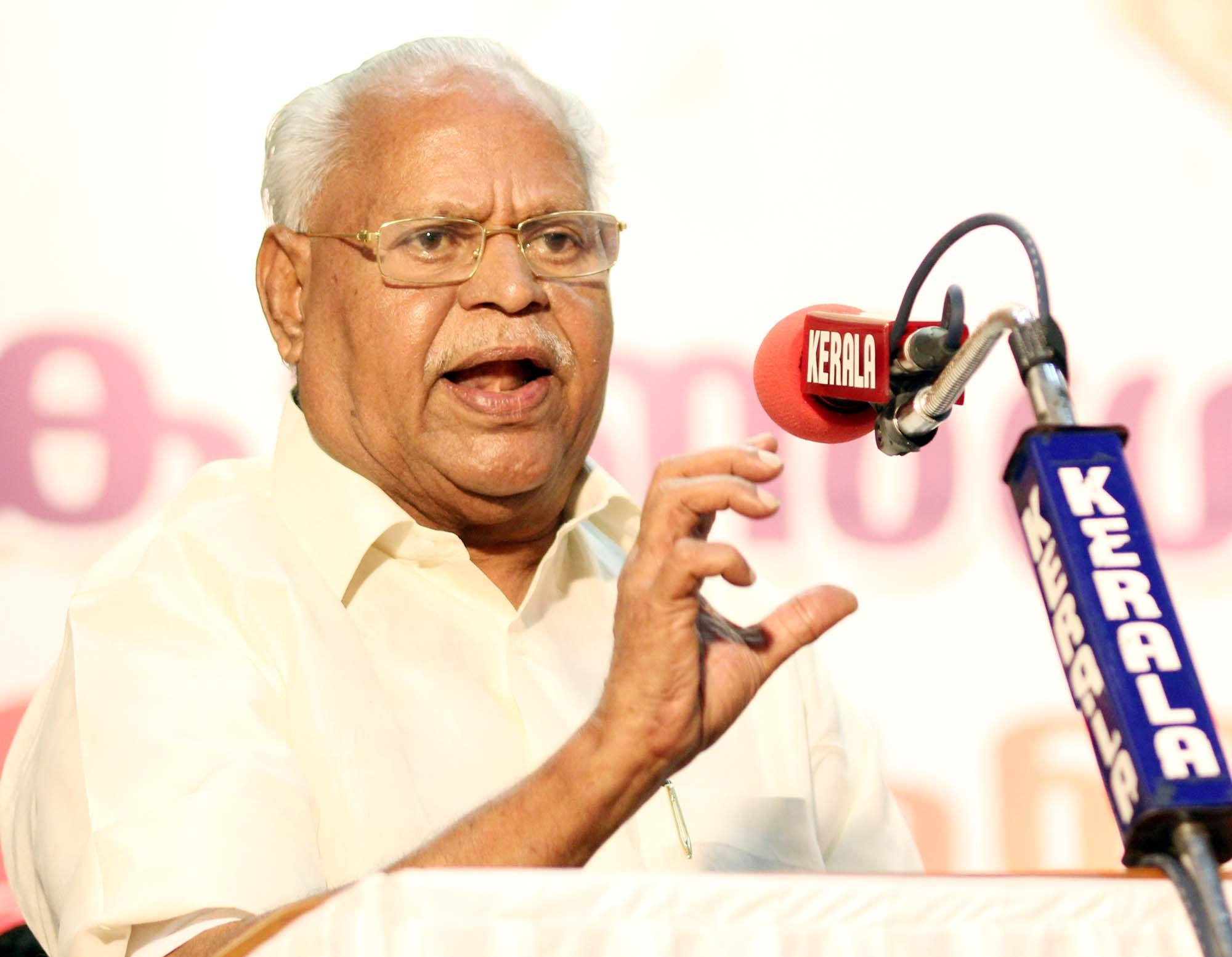

Minister of Co-operation, Khadi and Village Industries -Government of Kerala
- In office 18 May 2011 – 20 May 2016
- Governor: P Sathasivam
- Preceded by: G. Sudhakaran
- Succeeded by: A. C. Moideen
- Constituency: Wadakkanchery, Thrissur
- Majority: 6685

Personal details
- Born: 18 November 1934 Thrissur, Kerala
- Died: 10 December 2018 (aged 84) Kochi, Kerala
- Citizenship: Indian
- Party: Indian National Congress
- Spouse: Thankamoney Balakrishnan
- Relations: Married
- Children: C. B. Geetha, Mini Balram
- Occupation: Ex.MLA, Ex.Minister for Co-operation and Khadi and Village Industries -Government of Kerala
- Profession: Politician, Social Service

C. Narayanan Ezhuthachan Balakrishnan (Si. En. Bālakr̥ṣṇaṉ; 18 November 1934 – 10 December 2018) was an Indian politician. He was the minister for Co-operation, Khadi and Village Industries and Pollution Control -Government of Kerala under the Oommen Chandy Ministry. He became the representative in the Wadakkanchery constituency in Kerala after winning in the 2011 Assembly elections.

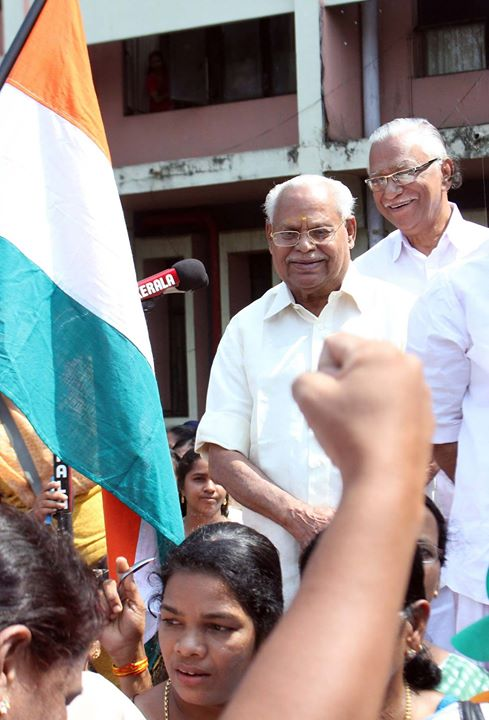
C N Balakrishnan

== Early life ==
Balakrishnan was born at Puzhakkal near Thrissur to parents Narayanan Ezhuthachan and Paruamma in 1934. After completing his education at Sree Ramakrishnasramam school, he became a Khadi worker. Later, he married Thankamoney, a teacher and a member of the Arakkal family, and they had two daughters, C. B. Geetha and Mini Balram.

Balakrishnan was always close to the leader K. Karunakaran, whom he worked with for more than 50 years. He was a strong leader in cooperative unions, beginning when he formed a fisherman society. He led the Thrissur milk supply union and Puranattukara service cooperative union. He also became the vice-president and subsequently president of district cooperative bank.

== Political life ==
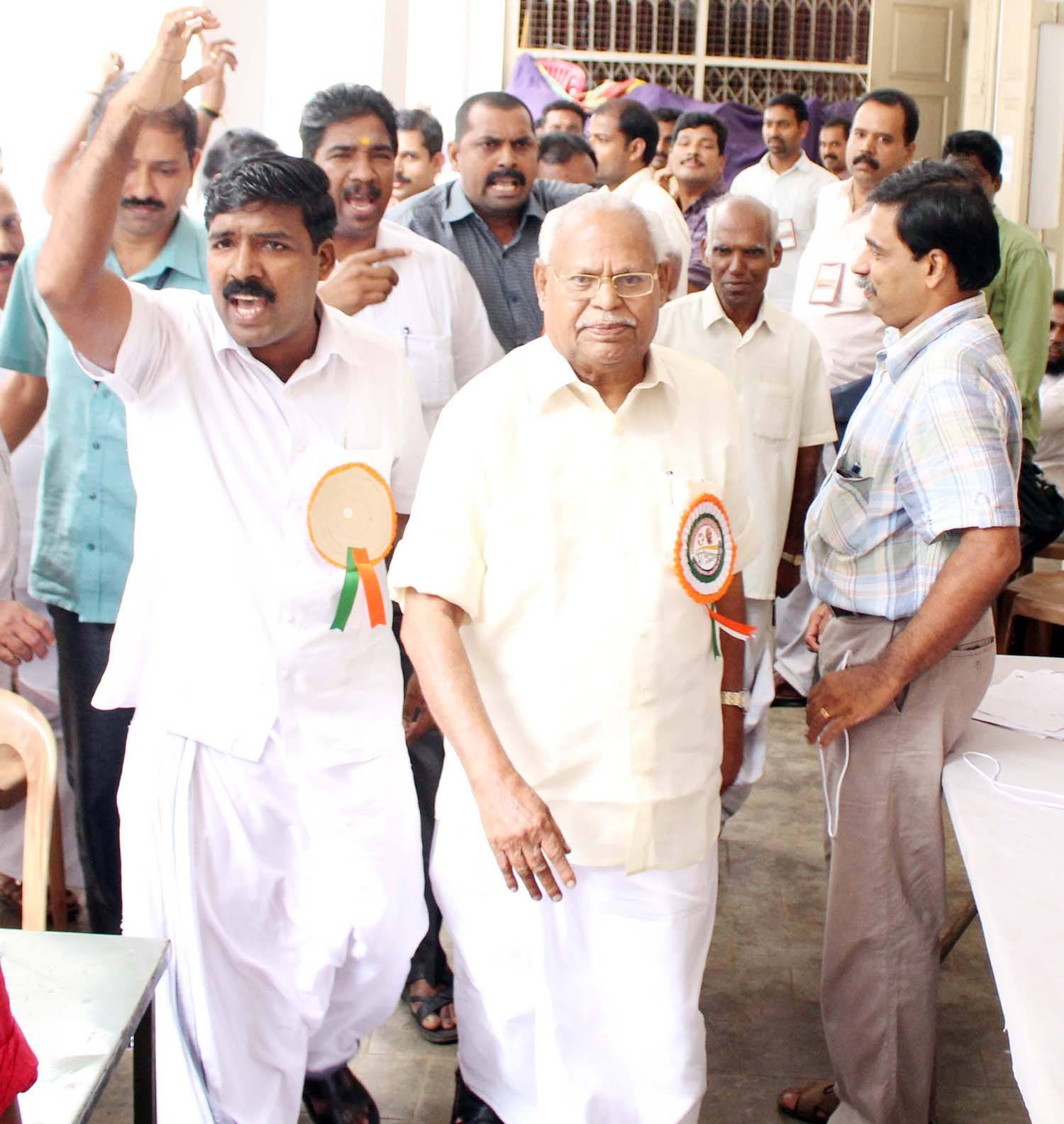

Balakrishnan came into politics when he was a librarian at the Puzhakkal library. He was always with local people and he worked a lot for Khadi industries and its development. He was association president of Kerala Khadi and village industries association for 32 years. In congress party, he was KPCC treasurer for many years. For thirty years he worked in Thrissur and gave leadership to Indian National Congress Party in Thrissur and was also Thrissur DCC president for fifteen years. C. N. Balakrishnan is also known as congress manager because of his ability to solve problems without hurting anyone.

He came in election for the first time at an age of 75 and he was able to win from Wadakkanchery constituency in 2011 Kerala assembly election. He defeated N. R. Balan of CPIM with 6685 votes.

Two personalities who influenced C. N. Balakrishnan most were late V. R. Krishnan Ezhuthachan, his socio-political guru and late K. Karunakaran whose close associate he was in Thrissur for 50 years. Following the footsteps of V. R. Krishnan Ezhuthachan he entered the Khadi movement in the early years of his life as a Khadi worker. He strengthened the activities of Kerala Khadi Village Industries Association and he has been working as its president and he continued in this position. It is because of the untiring efforts of Shri. C. N. Balakrishnan that about 2000 women are still employed in the Khadi sector in Thrissur district. He was also the State President of Kerala Khadi & Village Industries Association which coordinates the activities of Khadi movements in the State. The Kerala Khadi and Village Industries Association presided over by him received the National Award for the Best Organization in the Khadi and Village Industries sector in 2008. He has been giving leadership to improve the Khadi sector.

Balakrishnan was the front ranking volunteer and leader of the library movement in the state and worked along with the late P. N. Panikkar. He started his work in this arena as President of Puzhakkal Rural Library and became the President, Thrissur Taluk Grandhasala Sanghom, District President, Grandhasala Sanghom, and State Treasurer, Grandhasala Sanghom, He has been the architect and doyen of cooperative movement in Thrissur district. He entered into the activities of this movement as President of Adatt farmers' cooperative bank. Later, he took up immense responsibilities as President Thrissur District Milk Supply, President Thrissur District Cooperative Bank, President Paddy Marketing Cooperative Society, President District Kole Farmers' Association and Director Pariyaram Medical College. He still continued as an important leader of the Cooperation Cell of Indian National Congress directing its multifarious activities. During his tenureship as president of District Cooperative Bank he was instrumental in reviving several primary cooperative societies which were facing the bleak prospect of liquidation. The headquarters of Thrissur District Cooperative Bank and Jawaharlal Nehru International Convention Centre stand as testimony to the untiring work and leadership of C. N. Shri. C. N. Balakrishnan devoted his entire life to Indian National Congress. He worked hard as Thrissur District Congress Committee President for 15 years to make Thrissur an unassailable bastion of the party. The present DCC building, K. Karunakaran Sapthathy Mandiram was built during this time. He also worked as Treasurer of the District Congress Committee for many years. As Treasurer of Kerala Pradesh Congress Committee(KPCC) he succeeded in strengthening the party both within the district and throughout the State. The present KPCC Office, Indira Bhavan. Thiruvananthapuram was built during his tenure.

In 2011 the situation required that he should contest from Wadakkanchery, became member of Legislative Assembly for the first time and Minister for Cooperation.

== Ministerial Portfolio ==
Minister for Co-operation and Khadi and Village Industries, Government of Kerala

== Other Portfolios ==
- President- Kerala Khadi and Village Industries Federation;
- President- District Paddy Processing and Marketing Society Limited, Thrissur;
- Member & Board of Directors- District Coconut Processing and Marketing Society Limited, Thrissur;
- Treasurer, Vice-President and President of District Congress Committee, Thrissur;
- President- Puzhakkal Grameena Vayanasala, Taluk Grandhasala Sanghom and Kerala Grandhasala Sanghom, Thrissur;
- Joint Secretary- Kerala Grandhasala Sanghom, Thiruvananthapuram;
- Director- Adat Farmers Bank, Puranathukara;
- President- Milk Supply Union, Thrissur;
- Vice-President- Thrissur District Co-operative Bank Limited and later became its president two times. During his tenure, 'Jawaharlal International Convention centre', the most convenient centralised air-conditioned auditorium, being the headquarters of Thrissur District Co-operative Bank was constructed and many Co-operative institutions were also established.
- Treasurer- District Coal Farmers Sanghom;
- Office bearer- Bharat Sevak Samaj;
- Convener- District Citizens Forum; Participated in the Padayathra 45 days continuously in the state in connection with the Bhoodan Movement led by Acharya Vinobhajee

== Awards ==
- C N Balakrishnan has been chosen for the first Sahakari Ratna Puraskaram instituted in memory of late Congress leader P Vijayadas. A three-member jury selected the minister for the recognition considering his contributions in the state co-operative sector.
- K K Balakrishnan Award for best Social Worker

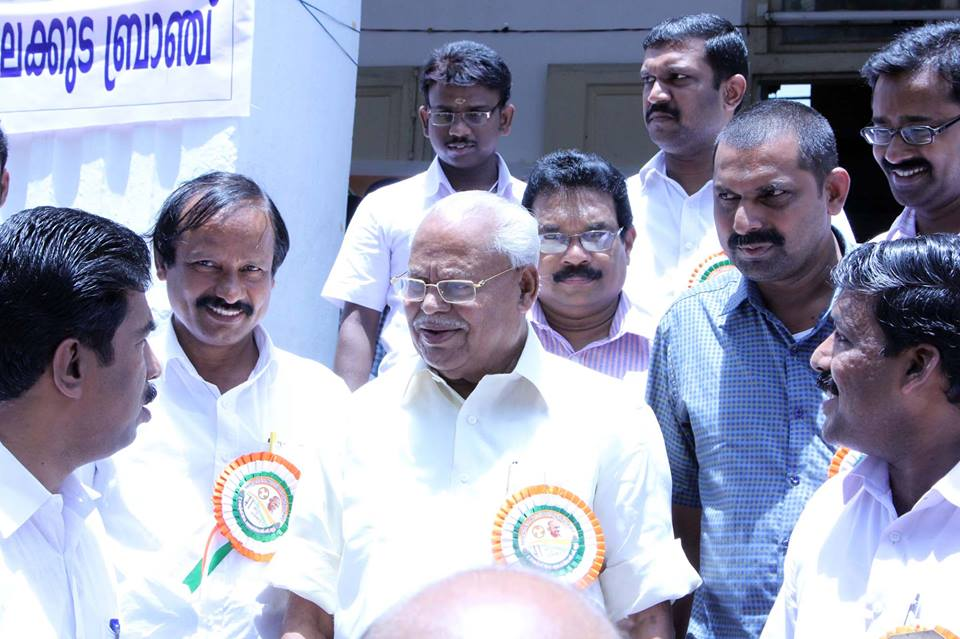

== See also ==
- Government of Kerala
- Kerala Ministers
