= Kalpattu =

Village in Villupuram, Tamil Nadu

kalpattu
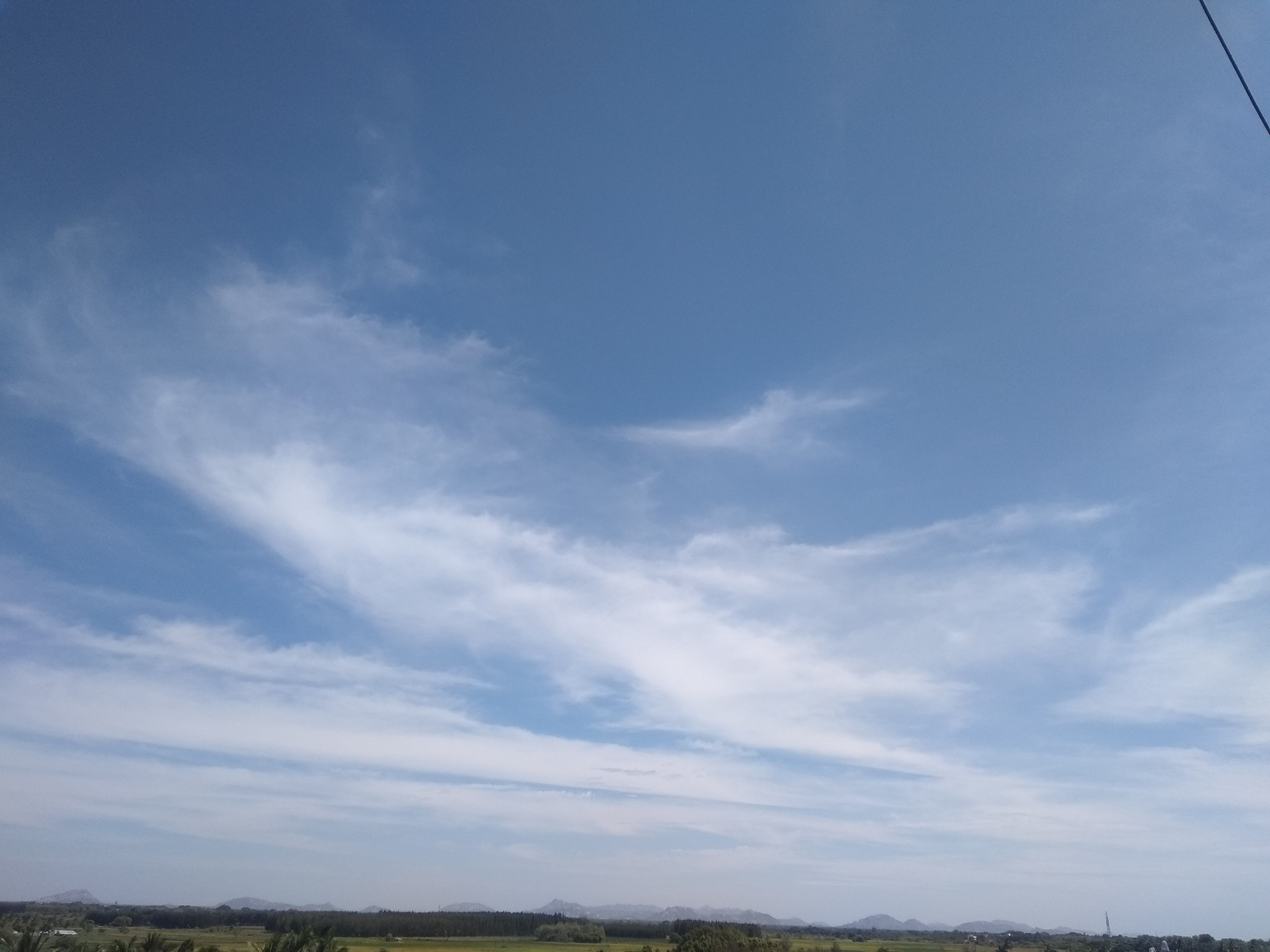
- view of kalpattu from the rocky mountain
- Country: India
- State: Tamil Nadu
- District: Viluppuram district
- City: Viluppuram

Government
  - Type: Municipal Corporation

Languages
  - Official: Tamil
- Time zone: UTC+5:30 (IST)
- PIN: 605302

"Kalpattu" or Kelpet is a village neighbourhood of Mambalapattu, Tamil Nadu, kanai block.The village is spelt in two ways kalpattu or kelpet. There are up to 900 household with up to 4000 people.

The village is widely known for St.Paul the Hermit church.

== St.Paul the Hermit church ==
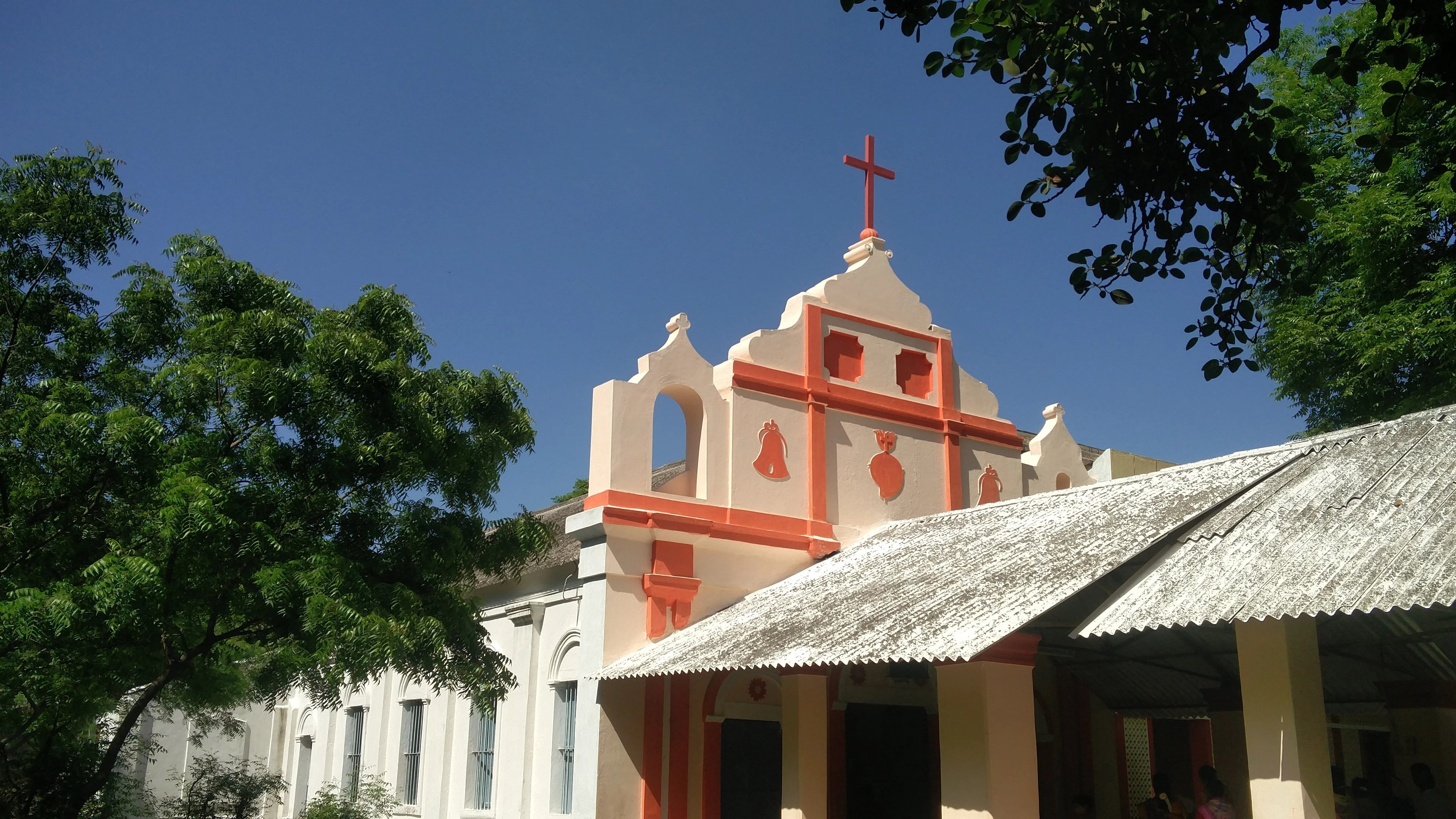
Old St.Paul the Hermit church

St.Paul the Hermit churchis the old church, the newer one attached to the right side of old church.. The St. Paul's feast comes every year on 8 August the feast celebrate very grandly every year, people come from everywhere and some people stay there till the feast end.

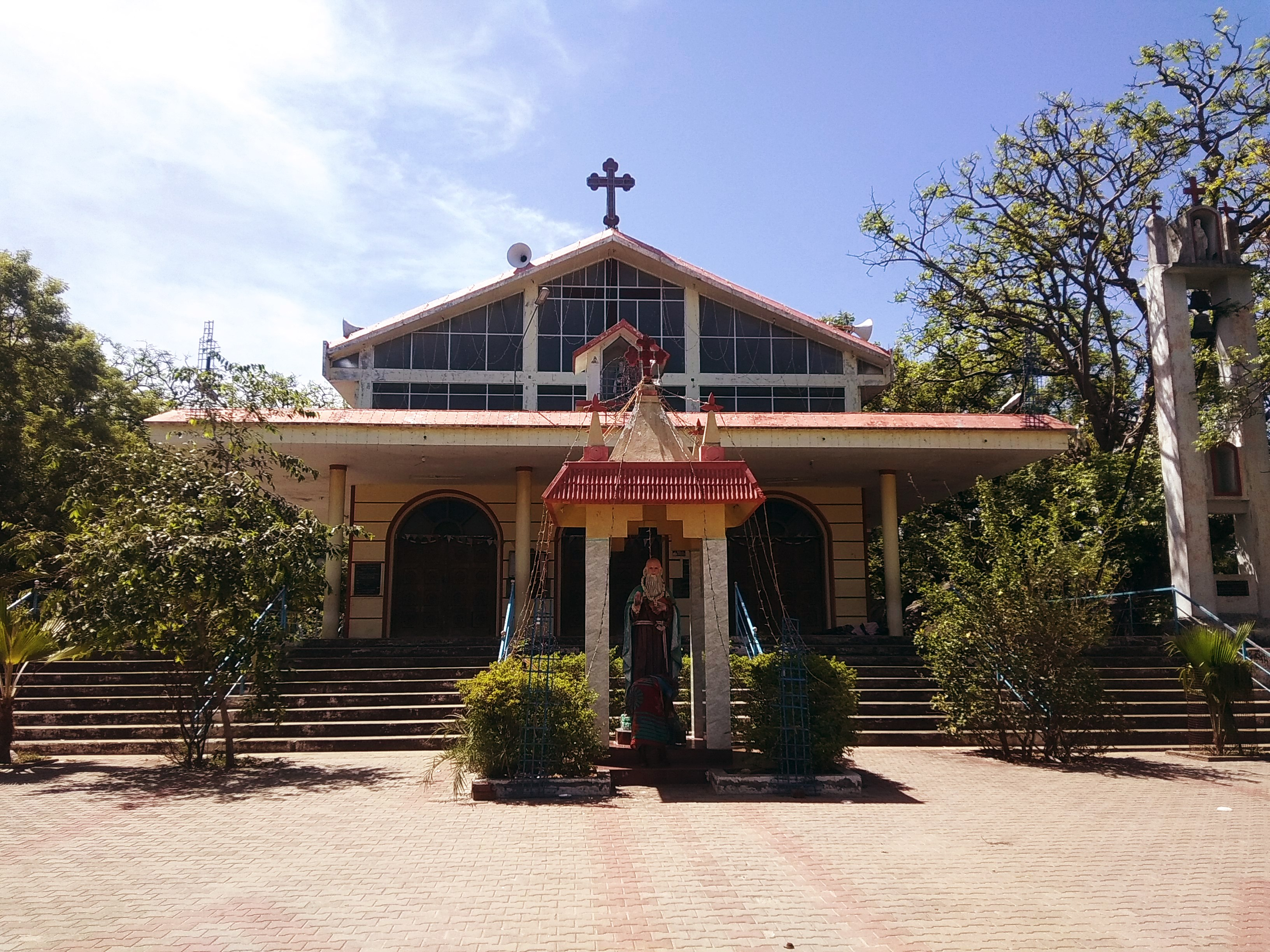
New St. Paul the Hermit church

== Sri Shaniswarar Temple ==
This temple is also famous where the people come from nearby villages for festival

== Location ==
The Kalpattu village which is located in kannai block, Viluppuram district, Tamil Nadu.In Villupuram city the road called Mambalapattu road through the road able to go kalpattu and many other villages and also known town Tirukoilur nowadays people not getting buses for kalpattu there are only few buses at all so mostly people take tirukoilur bus and they go to mambalapattu and then they go through kalpattu road to reach kalpattu.

== Education ==
In kalpattu there are R.C primary and government schools. In r.c primary school 1st to 5th standard and after that students go to government school. so education is only available till 10th standard in kalpattu after that students go to Mambalapattu school for 11th and 12th after 12th they to city for colleges.

== Business ==
Their main business is agriculture however some of them are working in cities

== See also ==
- Mambalapattu
- Viluppuram district
- Tirukoilur
