= Mambalapattu =

- Village
- Location in Tamil Nadu
- Coordinates: 11°57′25″N 79°22′20″E
- Country: India
- State: Tamil Nadu
- District: Viluppuram
- Subdistrict: Villuppuram
- Time zone: UTC+05:30 (IST)

Mambalapattu is a village in Viluppuram District, in the Indian state of Tamil Nadu. Which is a suburb village of villupuram city. Mambalapet located in the villupuram-tirukoilur highway.

== Transport ==
A railway station is located in Mambalapattu. Local trains are available 24 hours a day, as well as direct train routes from Viluppuram Junction to Tirupati.

== Education ==
- Government Higher Secondary School
- Aided Elementary School
- D.M. Elementary
- Panchayat Union Elementary School
- Mambalapattu Training Facility
