= Kopperundevi =

- Cilappatikaram character
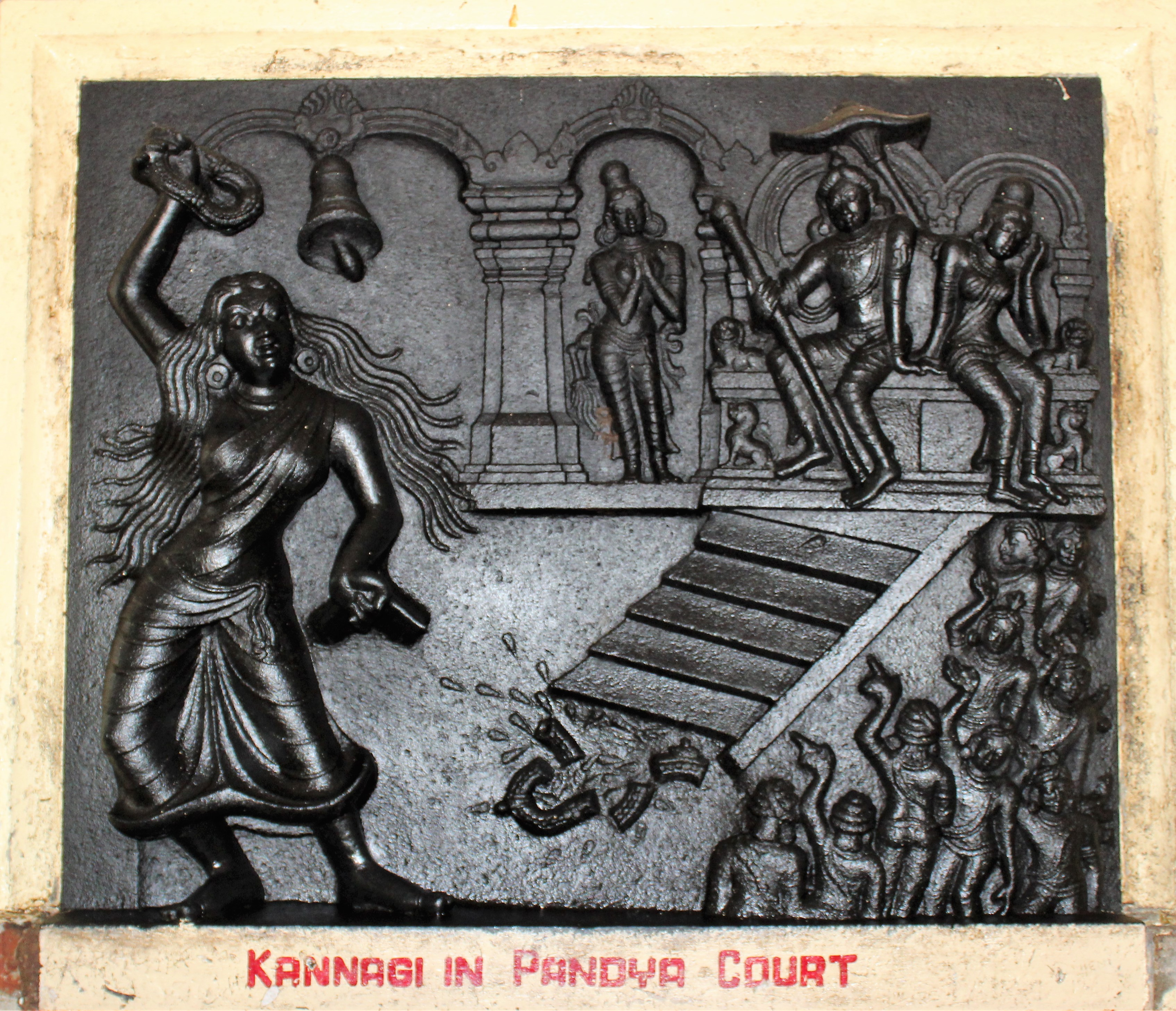
- Kannagi asking for justice in the court of Neduncheziyan, with Kopperundevi (top right) by his side
- First appearance: 2nd to 6th century CE
- Created by: Ilango Adigal

In-universe information
- Spouse: Neduncheziyan
- Nationality: Pandya Empire

Kopperundevi is one of the major characters in the Tamil epic Cilappatikaram written by Ilango Adigal (2nd to 6th century BCE). She is portrayed as the wife of Pandya king Neduncheziyan, and becomes indirectly responsible for the death of Kovalan, the husband of the titular character Kannagi.

== Literature ==
Cilappatikāram ("the Tale of an Anklet"), is one of the Five Great Epics in Tamil literature. It is attributed to a Ilango Adigal, a Chera prince turned monk, and was probably composed between 2nd to 6th centuries CE. The epic consists of 5,730 lines, and narrates the tragic story of Kannagi and her husband Kovalan.

== Story ==
The first part of Cilappatikāram describes the city of Puhar in the Chola Empire, where the pair of Kovalan and Kannagi reside. After Kovalan loses his wealth through his illicit relationship with the dancer Madhavi, he returns to Kannagi and the couple decide to move to Madurai in the Pandya Empire. The Pandyas are led by king Neduncheziyan and his wife Kopperundevi.

Kopperundevi is described as a dignified and chaste woman, and extols the virtues expected of a royal woman in classical Tamil literature. When Kovalan attempts to sell one of the two anklets of Kannagi to raise money, the royal goldsmith, who had earlier stolen an anklet belonging to the queen Kopperundevi, finds the that anklets are similar, and falsely accuses Kovalan of stealing the queen’s anklet. Enraged by the act, the king Neduncheziyan orders Kovalan’s arrest and execution without a fair trial.

After Kovalan is executed, Kannagi appears in the royal court, trying to prove her husband’s innocence and demanding justice. She breaks open her remaining anklet to reveal that her anklet contained rubies whereas queen Kopperundevi's missing anklet contained pearls. When the king realised the truth and his mistake, he kills himself due to remorse. The queen, Kopperundevi, unable to bear the grief and shame caused by the unjust execution, also dies soon afterward.

== Role ==
Although Kopperundevi appears only briefly in the epic, her anklet becomes the main trigger of the central conflict of the story line. She suffers a tragedy not because of her own making, and is one of the tragic characters of the epic, along with Kannagi.
