= Kodungallooramma =

- Directed by: Kunchacko
- Written by: Jagathy N. K. Achary
- Produced by: M. Kunchacko
- Starring: Prem Nazir; K. R. Vijaya; Adoor Bhasi; Thikkurissy Sukumaran Nair
- Music by: K. Raghavan
- Production company: Excel Productions
- Distributed by: Excel Productions
- Release date: 22 November 1968
- Country: India
- Language: Malayalam

Kodungallooramma is a 1968 Indian Malayalam-language film, directed and produced by Kunchacko. The film stars Prem Nazir, K. R. Vijaya, Adoor Bhasi and Thikkurissy Sukumaran Nair. It was based on the Tamil poem Chilappathikaram by Ilango Adigal and also tells the story of Kodungallur Bhagavathy Temple, where the leading deity is also considered as Kannagi, the heroine of Chilappathikaram. The film had musical score by K. Raghavan.

== Plot ==
Kovalan and Kannaki are a happily married couple living in the magnificent Chola kingdom. Their lives take a turn when Madhavi, a court dancer bewitches Kovalan with her mesmerising looks and beauty. Kovalan therefore leaves Kannaki for Madhavi and marries her. Despite everyone persuading Kannaki to leave and forget about Kovalan, she, on the other hand, would not and instead pray for his well-being with the hope that he would return to her. In the meantime, Kovalan catches Madhavi red-handed sleeping with another man. Realising his mistake he returns to Kannaki, who welcomed him with happy tears and open arms, eventually forgiving him.

Kovalan, who was now penniless, decided to start his business from scratch. He requested Kannaki for one of her anklets so that they could sell it and have some capital to start a business to which Kannaki readily heeded. So they move from the Chola kingdom to the Pandya kingdom.

When Kovalan went to the nearest goldsmith to pawn the anklet, the goldsmith smelled something fishy because the anklet resembled the queen's stolen anklet. The information was sent to the king, who arrested Kovalan and beheaded him without trial. This shocks Kannaki so much that she becomes violent and angry and barges into the palace to prove her husband's innocence. On finding out about his mistake, the king requests Kannaki to calm down and asks for her forgiveness but she does not accept his apology. Grief-stricken with guilt and shame, the king and queen die. But this does not satiate Kannaki and she transforms into an enormous eight-armed figure and destroys the Pandiyan kingdom with fire. After having had enough of troubles from the Chola and the Pandya kingdoms, with a prayer in mind, Kannaki throws her remaining anklet towards the Chera kingdom where her soul would find peace. Since then the deity in Kodungallur Temple is worshipped as Kannaki Amma.

== Cast ==
- Prem Nazir as Kovalan
- K. R. Vijaya as Kannaki
- Adoor Bhasi as Chinese Merchant
- Thikkurissy Sukumaran Nair as Kovalan's Father
- Jose Prakash as Cholarajavu
- Manavalan Joseph as Swami
- Adoor Pankajam as Konkimaami
- Aranmula Ponnamma as Kavunthi
- Jyothi Lakshmi as Madhavi
- Kaduvakulam Antony as Cook
- Kalaikkal Kumaran as Dalapathi
- Kanchana (old) as Thattathi
- Kottarakkara Sreedharan Nair as Pandya Rajavu
- N. Govindankutty as Thattaan
- Nellikode Bhaskaran as Ganapathy
- S. P. Pillai as Konkammavan
- Khadeeja as Maharani

== Soundtrack ==
The music was composed by K. Raghavan and the lyrics were written by Vayalar Ramavarma.

No.	Song	Singers	Lyrics	Length (m:ss)
1	"Bhadradeepam"	S. Janaki	Vayalar Ramavarma	
2	"Kaaverippoompattanathil"	P. Susheela, M. Balamuralikrishna	Vayalar Ramavarma	
3	"Kodungallooramme"	M. Balamuralikrishna, Chorus	Vayalar Ramavarma	
4	"Manjubhaashini"	K. J. Yesudas	Vayalar Ramavarma	
5	"Narthaki"	K. J. Yesudas, P. Susheela	Vayalar Ramavarma	
6	"Rithukanyakayude"	P. Susheela	Vayalar Ramavarma	
7	"Sthree Hridayam"	P. B. Sreenivas	Vayalar Ramavarma	
8	"Udayaasthamanangale"	K. J. Yesudas	Vayalar Ramavarma	
