= Kovalan =

Character in Tamil epic Silappatikaram

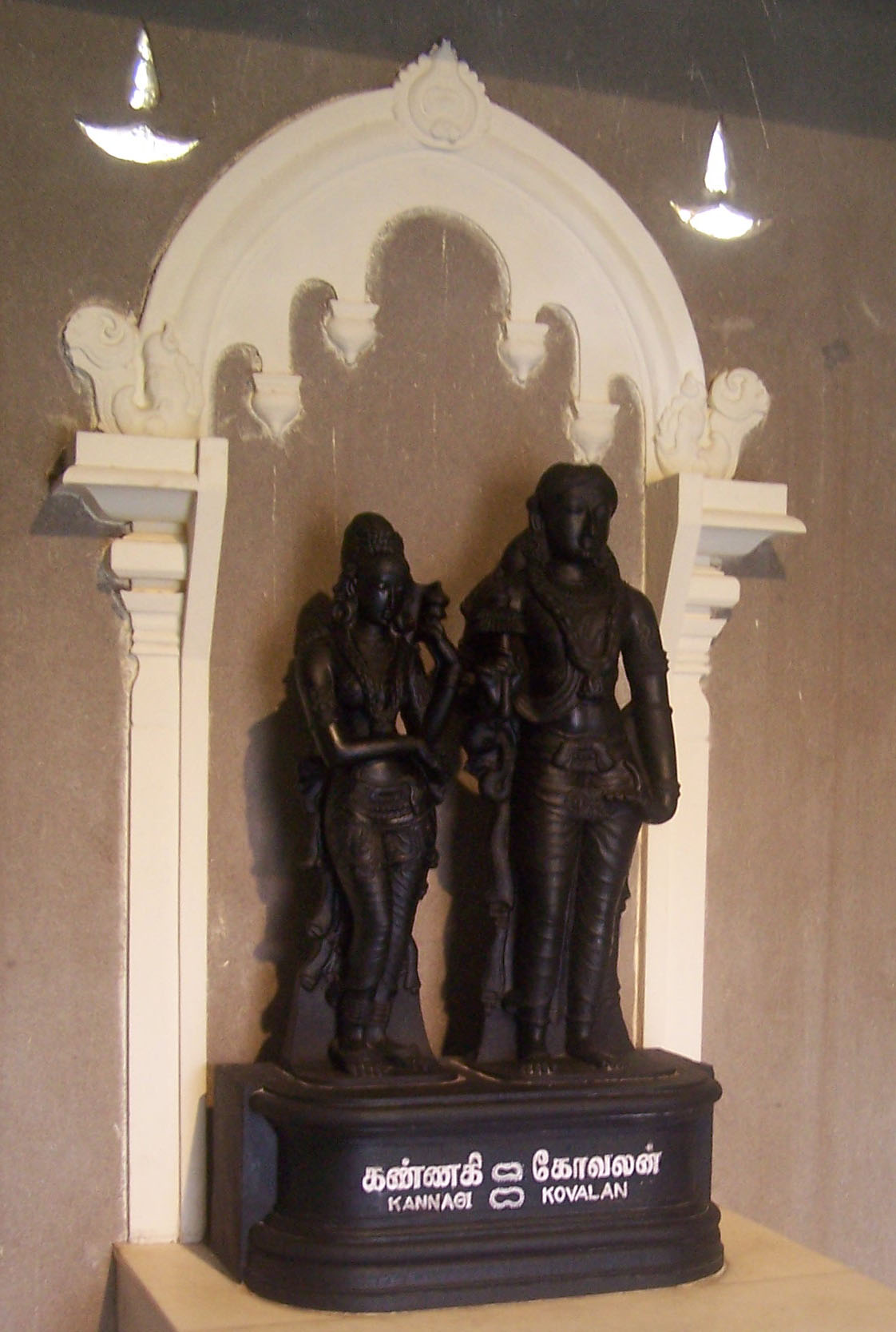
- Kovalan (right) with his wife Kannagi
- First appearance: Cilappatikaram
- Created by: Ilango Adigal

In-universe information
- Gender: Male
- Occupation: Merchant
- Spouse: Kannagi
- Children: Manimekalai (with Madhavi)
- Home: Puhar, Early Chola Kingdom

Kovalan is a central character in Ilango Adigal's Cilappatikaram, one of the Five Great Epics in Tamil literature.

== Literature ==
Cilappatikāram ("the Tale of an Anklet"), is one of the Five Great Epics in Tamil literature. It is attributed to a Ilango Adigal, a Chera prince turned monk, and was probably composed between 2nd to 6th centuries CE. The epic consists of 5,730 lines, and narrates the tragic story of Kannagi and her husband Kovalan.

== Narrative ==
Kovalan is the son of a wealthy merchant Machattuvan, in the Chola port city of Puhar. He marries Kannagi, who is described as a virtuous and devoted woman. While their married life initially appears happy, Kovalan later becomes attracted to the courtesan and dancer Madhavi. He becomes captivated by her beauty, and enters into an extra marital relationship with her. He spends most of his wealth on her, and the relationship creates tensions with Kannagi.

Kovalan has a misunderstanding with Madhavi, and after losing most of his wealth, he realises his mistake and returns to his wife Kannagi. Kannagi forgives him despite his earlier betrayal, and the couple decides to leave Puhar and travel to the Pandya capital of Madurai to start a new life.

At Madurai, Kovalan attempts to sell one of the two anklets of Kannagi to raise money. The royal goldsmith, who had earlier stolen an anklet belonging to the queen Kopperundevi, finds the that anklets are similar, and falsely accuses Kovalan of stealing the queen’s anklet. Enraged by the act, the king Neduncheziyan orders Kovalan’s arrest and execution without a fair trial.

After Kovalan is executed, Kannagi appears in the royal court, trying to prove her husband’s innocence and demanding justice. She breaks open her remaining anklet to reveal that her anklet contained rubies whereas queen Kopperundevi's missing anklet contained pearls. When the king realised the truth and his mistake, he kills himself due to remorse. The queen, Kopperundevi, unable to bear the grief and shame caused by the unjust execution, also dies soon afterward.

== In films ==
Year	Title	Language	Actor
1942	Kannagi	Tamil	P. U. Chinnappa
1964	Poompuhar	Tamil	S. S. Rajendran
1968	Kodungallooramma	Malayalam	Prem Nazir
2016	Paththini	Sinhala	Uddika Premarathna
