= Kannagi (1942 film) =

- Theatrical release poster
- Directed by: M. Somasundaram; R. S. Mani
- Written by: Elangovan
- Starring: P. U. Chinnappa; P. Kannamba
- Music by: S. V. Venkatraman
- Production company: Jupiter Pictures
- Distributed by: South India Pictures
- Release date: 2 August 1942
- Running time: 228 minutes
- Country: India
- Language: Tamil
- Budget: ₹2.5 lakh

Kannagi is a 1942 Indian Tamil-language epic film directed by R.S Mani based on one of The Five Great Epics of Tamil Literature, Cilappatikaram. This is the first Tamil film based on the epic. The second film, Poompuhar, was released in 1964.

== Plot ==
R.S. Mani directs this mythological fantasy based on the first century A.D. Tamil Jain saga Silapadhigaaram. The film centers on Kovalan (P.U. Chinnappa), who is married to the faithful Kannagi (P. Kannamba). Later, Kovalan falls for the beautiful, dissolute dancer Madhavi (N.S. Saroja), who leads him to ruin. Kannagi comes in at the last moment and saves him from almost certain debauchery. She also offers to sell her golden anklet to restore the household's depleted funds. Unfortunately, the artistry and value of the object leads the king of a neighbouring land to accuse Kovalan of theft and sentence him to the chopping block. Once again, Kannagi comes in at the last moment and proves to the king and the queen that they are innocent, causing them both to die instantly. After razing Madhavi's native village to the ground, Kannagi ascends to heaven.

== Cast ==
The cast according to the opening credits of the film and the songbook:

Female cast

- P. Kannamba as Kannagi
- M. S. Saroja as Madhavi
- T. A. Mathuram as Vanjippathan's Daughter
- U. R. Jeevarathnam as Gownthiyadigal
- M. M. Radha Bai as Pandia's Wife
- T. V. A. Boorani as Vasanthamalai
- Golden Saradambal
- Kumari Rathnam as Young Kannagi
- S. R. Rajalakshmi
- S. Yogambal as Madhari
- S. Mangalam
- S. K. Lakshmi
- T. A. Jayalakshmi as Dancer
- K. A. Jayalakshmi as Dancer
- T. R. Kalyani
- Sarojani
- M. R. Alli
- Chellam
- Ranganayaki
- A. T. Sakku Bai as Injippathan's Wife

Male cast

- P. U. Chinnappa as Kovalan
- N. S. Krishnan as Injippathan
- M. R. Swaminathan as Vanjippathan
- T. R. Ramachandran as Shastri
- D. Balasubramanyam as Pandian
- S. V. Sahasranamam as Paramasivan
- K. N. Kolathu Nani as Machottan
- K. P. Jayaraman as Manackam
- T. V. Namasivayam as Young Kovalan
- K. N. Ramalingam as Good Man
- S. P. Soundappan
- K. R. Chellamuthu
- M. S. Viswanathan
- K. S. Mani
- V. S. Kittappa
- V. Ramani as Bad Minster
- T. A. Anandan
- T. A. Narayanan
- M. Ramanathan
- P. G. Kuppuswami
- T. R. Ramaswami
- E. Krishnamurthi as Thanikachalam
- Thiruvenkatam as Meenakshi

== Production ==
The film was mounted on a lavish budget of ₹2.5 lakh (worth ₹25 crore in 2021 prices). The producers chose Elangovan to write the script after being impressed with his work in Ashok-Kumar (1941). The script was finalised after reading 16 scripts relating to the same concept and picking some points from them. P. Kannamba was cast as the titular character and she was 31 years old during the film's shoot. Thyagaraja bagavathar was considered for the role of Kovalan but makers felt that pair may look odd since Kannamba acted as his stepmother in Ashokkumar, finally Chinnappa who shot to fame with Aryamala was selected to play Kovalan. Chinnappa had apprehensions to act with Kannamba since she is talented and also taller than him however producers convinced him to do the role. G. Subbalakshmi who was chosen for the role of Madhavi was removed due to misunderstanding and she was replaced by M. Saroja. The film was supposed to be shot at Coimbatore but later it was shot at Newton Studios. The dance sequences were choreographed by TR Raghunath who during the film's production fell in love with M. Saroja and married her. The film was originally directed by Boman Irani however he was replaced by then 22-year-old RS Mani after producers were not impressed with the work of Irani. The song "Maanamellam" was shot at Mahabalipuram. Choreography was done by V. B. Ramaiah Pillai and Pandit Bholonath Sharma.

== Soundtrack ==
The music was composed by S. V. Venkatraman while the orchestration was by N. S. Balakrishnan and group. In all, 22 songs were penned by Udumalai Narayana Kavi.

| No. | Title | Lyrics | Length |
|---|---|---|---|
| 1. | "Chandrodhayam" | Udumalai Narayana Kavi | 03:07 |
| 2. | "Pathiniye Unpole" | Udumalai Narayana Kavi | 02:43 |
| 3. | "Anbil Vilaindha Amudame" | Udumalai Narayana Kavi | 02:08 |
| 4. | "Vandanal Oru Sundari" | Udumalai Narayana Kavi | 04:17 |
| 5. | "Inbamendre Thunbamathai" | Udumalai Narayana Kavi | 03:07 |

== Release ==
The film ran over in 110 cities and more than 1 crore people had watched the film. CN Annadurai criticised the film in the magazine "Dravida Naadu". Randor Guy wrote that film is "remembered for: Kannamba's brilliant performance, a classic example of how dialogue should be delivered in cinema. Also for Chinnappa's equally impressive performance, Saroja's dance sequences and tuneful music".

== Legacy ==
The film's success enabled the producers M. Somasundaram and S. K. Mohideen to take Central Studios, Coimbatore on lease and launch several productions simultaneously. The film also gained popularity for its dialogues. Elangovan achieved stardom, thus laying the foundation for dialogue writers. Kannamba achieved star status with this film, being her third venture in Tamil. Mohan Raman wrote she handled the literary and poetic Tamil without compromising on emotion, diction or cadence. Her performance in that film remains iconic. The success of the film led Jupiter Somu to do a similar project Thanga Padhumai (1959) on the theme of "woman, who is chastity personified fighting a relentless battle to win her husband back".

== Bibliography ==
- Dhananjayan, G. (2014). Pride of Tamil Cinema: 1931–2013. Blue Ocean Publishers. OCLC 898765509.
