= Poompuhar (film) =

- Theatrical release poster
- Directed by: P. Neelakantan
- Screenplay by: M. Karunanidhi
- Story by: Ilango Adigal
- Starring: S. S. Rajendran; C. R. Vijayakumari; Rajasree; K. B. Sundarambal
- Music by: R. Sudarsanam
- Production company: Mekala Pictures
- Distributed by: SSR Pictures
- Release date: 18 September 1964
- Country: India
- Language: Tamil

Poompuhar is a 1964 Indian Tamil-language epic film directed by P. Neelakantan and written by M. Karunanidhi. It is the second film based on the epic Cilappatikaram after Kannagi (1942). The film stars S. S. Rajendran, C. R. Vijayakumari, Rajasree and K. B. Sundarambal. It was released on 18 September 1964.

== Plot ==
More than 2000 years ago, Southern India was divided into three Tamil kingdoms, namely the Chola, Pandya, and Chera dynasties which ruled most of present-day Tamil Nadu and Kerala. Kannagi was born in the city of Puhar in the Chola dynasty. She is married to a rich baron named Kovalan. They lived a beautiful, long married life. Meanwhile, the ceremony of appointing Madhavi as the princess in the Chola kingdom was held at this time. Kovalan was also invited to the ceremony among the dignitaries.

After the appointment of Madhavi as the princess of the actresses by the king, he gave her permission to choose anyone as her husband among the dignitaries. Impressing all the participants, Madhavi chose Kovalan as her husband. Kovalan also began to like Madhavi because of her beautiful appearance and her talent. Due to this incident, the beautiful married life between Kannagi and Kovalan had been broken. Kovalan spends all his wealth on Madhavi. Kannagi finds out about Kovalan and Madhavi's relationship and breaks down. After her heartbreak, Kannagi is abused by youngsters. Kovalan's father advises Kannagi to marry someone else, but, due to her chastity, she instead waits for Kovalan to return.

Because of their profession, Madhavi had to entertain the dignitaries who came for her. Her actions are not accepted by Kovalan. Because of these reasons, disputes had been created among them and Kovalan ends his relationship with Madhavi and reunites with Kannagi. Kannagi forgives him and they live together happily.

But now they are poor because Kovalan had spent all his wealth on Madhavi. After all, they only have Kannagi's golden ruby-encrusted anklets which are valuable and they are subjected to the sight of the people in the city of Puhar. They run away from the Chola kingdom to the Pandya kingdom with the intention of living freely thereby selling Kannagi's golden anklets.

They escaped secretly without knowing others except for Madhavi. She waits for them on the way of them with her hostess. They find out that Madhavi is pregnant with Kovalan's child. Because of this incident, Kannagi requests Kovalan to go back for her but Kovalan refuses the request. At last, Kovalan and Kannagi move to the Pandya kingdom while Madhavi leaves for her home.

With time, Madhavi gives birth to her daughter Manimekala. Hearing the story of her father and mother at a young age, Manimekala becomes dissatisfied with her normal life. Due to this reason, she refuses the marriage proposal of the Chola prince. She converts to Buddhism after hearing the sermon of a Buddhist monk in the Chola kingdom. But the prince is always after her. One day, he was killed by Manimekala and she was banished from the kingdom for her act.

Kovalan finds out about Madhavi and her daughter Manimekala, but he repents for his actions and decides not to meet Madhavi and Manimekala again. Kovalan and Kannagi lived for so long without selling the anklets but now they got to know that they couldn't resist their life without selling them. Kovalan is determined to sell one anklet and keep one anklet with Kannagi and he leaves for Madurapura (present-day Madurai), the capital of the Pandya dynasty.

Meanwhile, he approaches Madurapura, At the same time, one of the anklets of the Pandya queen has been stolen. The king announces a prize for the person who brings the queen's anklet back. Kovalan had to meet the royal goldsmith (the one who stole the queen's anklet) to sell Kannagi's anklet. The mischievous goldsmith rushes to the palace and tells the king that he caught the thief who stole the royal anklet.

The king orders his men to capture Kovalan and return the royal anklet. After Kovalan is brought to the palace, the king orders his men to execute him without thinking twice. Meanwhile, Kannagi comes to Madhurapura and searches for Kovalan She comes to know that Kovalan was executed for falsely stealing the royal anklet. The king and queen are happy that they got their anklet. But Kannagi storms into the palace court and throws the anklet with such force that it breaks open. The anklet is revealed to contain rubies, as opposed to the queen's anklet which contains pearls. The queen faints out of shock. Kannagi curses the king for his actions and curses Madurapura to be burnt to the ground. A spark of fire appears and kills the king, the queen, and everyone in Madurapura. Madurapura is burnt to the ground as Kannagi ascends to heaven. After this, the people of Sri Lanka and Tamil Nadu revere Kannagi as a goddess and call her Pattini or Kannagi Amman.

== Cast ==
- C. R. Vijayakumari as Kannagi
- S. S. Rajendran as Kovalan
- Rajasree as Madhavi
- K. B. Sundarambal as Gavundhi Adigal
- Nagesh as Ganasabai
- Manorama as Vasanthamalai
- O. A. K. Thevar as King Nedunjeliyan I
- G. Sakunthala as Kopperundevi
- Senthamarai as Minister of Pandyan kingdom

== Soundtrack ==
Music was composed by R. Sudarsanam.

Track listing
No.	Title	Lyrics	Singers	Length
1.	"Ennai Mudhal Mudhallaga"	Radha Manikam	T. M. Soundararajan, S. Janaki	3:37
2.	"Ponnaal Idhupole"	Udumalai Narayana Kavi	S. Janaki	3:28
3.	"Vazhkkai Ennum Odam"	M. Karunanidhi	K. B. Sundarambal	3:19
4.	"Thappitthu Vandhanamma"	Mayavanathan	K. B. Sundarambal	2:36
5.	"Andru Kollum"	Mayavanathan	K. B. Sundarambal	2:16
6.	"Iraiva Iraiva"	Alangudi Somu	P. Susheela	3:55
7.	"Kaaviri Penne"	Mayavanathan	P. Susheela, T. M. Soundararajan	3:29
8.	"Pottirunthum"	Alangudi Somu	P. Susheela	3:13
9.	"Thamizh Engal Uyiranathu"	Mayavanathan	P. Susheela	4:30
10.	"Thunbamellam"	Mayavanathan	K. B. Sundarambal	3:22
11.	"Thottavudan Malaronru"	Mayavanathan	K. B. Sundarambal	0:38
Total length:				34:23

== Release and reception ==
Poompuhar was released on 18 September 1964 and distributed by SSR Pictures in Madras. The Indian Express called it an "ambitious motion picture in the grand tradition of screen spectacle. It combines lavish and gigantic sets, good acting [..] and pleasing music by Sudharshanam". T. M. Ramachandran of Sport and Pastime wrote the story is "well-known, the film sustains the interest of the audience on account of imaginative treatment and deft touches by director P. Neelakantan" while praising the artistes and their performances. Kalki published a two page review of the film done by two persons; Na. Thyagarasan, secretary of Madhavi Mandram felt Poompuhar completely ruined the story and characters which were originally conceived by Ilango Adigal and those changes done only damage to the story but praised the acting while Senthoora Pandian felt though the film begins like The Ten Commandments by Cecil B. DeMille, it falls short of being epic due to the maker's conveying of message while also expressing giving naturalistic treatment for an epic plot and portraying Kannagi as atheist. In 1975, Naagai Dharuman of Navamani praised Karunanidhi's dialogues, acting and scenes of present day Poompuhar.
