= Thanga Padhumai =

- Theatrical release poster
- Directed by: A. S. A. Sami
- Screenplay by: A. S. A. Sami
- Story by: Aru. Ramanathan
- Produced by: M. Somasundaram
- Starring: Sivaji Ganesan; Padmini
- Cinematography: P. Ramasamy
- Edited by: A. Thangarajan
- Music by: Viswanathan–Ramamoorthy
- Production company: Jupiter Pictures
- Release date: 10 January 1959
- Running time: 184 minutes
- Country: India
- Language: Tamil
- Budget: ₹800,000

Thanga Padhumai (transl. Golden Statue) is a 1959 Indian Tamil language film starring Sivaji Ganesan and Padmini. The film was co-written and directed by A. S. A. Sami, produced by M. Somasundaram under Jupiter Pictures, and had music by Viswanathan–Ramamoorthy. Thanga Pathumai proved to be a hit in its re-release, and won National Film Award for Best Feature Film in Tamil for the year 1959.

== Plot ==
Manivannan is a physician, but a simpleton. Selvi, daughter of a rich trader of Uraiyur was modelled on Kannagi as the personification of female virtues. The emeralds in the eyes of Kannagi Devi statue at Uraiyur are precious and attract the princess Raja Vadana of the neighbouring kingdom. To get the gems, the commander Balakumaran and Raja Vadana send their dancer Maya Mohini to dance at the Uraiyur festival.

Maya Mohini catches the eye of Manivannan, much to the fury of his wife and father-in-law. She is insulted and sent away during the dance, and earns the pity of Manivannan who leaves Selvi and settles with Maya Mohini, in the process losing his property as well his wife's, and the family falls on hard times. Manivannan's father-in-law passes away in this shock and Selvi's child is born.

Manivannan's father is on his death bed and Selvi goes to meet Maya Mohini to get her husband back. Maya Mohini is by now moved by Manivannan's innocence and refuses to hand over his property to the Balakumara . A furious Balakumaran has beaten Manivannan unconscious when Selvi reaches Maya Mohini's place

Maya Mohini demands a mortgage from Selvi for releasing her husband. With no other option, Selvi hands over her son to Maya Mohini and tells him that she would take back the child after giving her a gold statue( Thanga Padhumai) equal to the child. Selvi also states that she will not bear any other child till this child is taken back

Manivannan's father passes away before they reach home and Manivannan and Selvi move to the kingdom of Raja Vadana. Maya Mohini face is burnt by Raja Vadana for supporting Manivannan and Manivannan child is held captive. Maya Mohini visits the physician house and is moved by the way Manivannam and Selvi treats him. She takes back her promise and upholds that she will return the child to Selvi

The king is unwell due to brain tumour and the physician is commanded to the palace to treat the king where Raja Vadana falls for him. She hatches a plan with commander Balakumara to kill the King and Manivannan is blamed for same and sent to prison. Since he doesn't fall to the vicious love of Raja Vadana he is also blinded .

In a long song-oriented climax, Selvi gets the emerald gems of Kannagi statue as per Raja Vadana's demand, but on seeing her blinded husband, boils up in fury and asks Raja Vadana to stare at the gems. The powerful gems blinds her. She curses the entire kingdom to succumb to fire (Similar to story of Kannagi). Maya Mohini hands back her son before getting engulfed in fire. Selvi brings Manivannan to Kannagi temple, restores the gems back to Kannagi statue and gets Manivannan's eyes restored.

== Cast ==
Cast according to the opening credits of the film

Male cast

- Sivaji Ganesan as Manivannan
- M. N. Nambiar as Villavan
- Kalaivanar N. S. Krishnan as Chinnaiah
- Kuladeivam V. R. Rajagopal
- Pulimootai Ramasami as Nagavijayan
- D. Balasubramaniam as Muthuvelar
- R. Balasubramaniam as Manivanna's father
- K. Duraisami
- M. R. Saminathan

Female cast

- Padmini as Selvi
- M. N. Rajam as Raja Vadana
- T. P. Muthulakshmi
- T. R. Rajakumari as Maya Mohini

Dance

- Lalitha
- E. V. Saroja
- Lakshmirajyam-Sasi

== Production ==
In the late 1950s, Somu of Jupiter Pictures thought of remaking Kannagi (1942) with Sivaji Ganesan starring as Kovalan. He screened the film to mentor C. N. Annadurai who watched it along with A. S. A. Sami, who was to direct the potential remake. After watching the film, Annadurai told them that remaking the film would not prove successful. The project was dropped, but the idea of making something similar about "a woman, who is chastity personified fighting a relentless battle to win her husband back" remained in Somu's mind, resulting in Thanga Padhumai. Writers Aru. Ramanathan and Sami wrote the script inspired from the American film The Egyptian (1954). The producers initially approached Anjali Devi, P. Bhanumathi and Lalitha for the character of Mayamohini for which they did not agree; T. R. Rajakumari was eventually chosen. Sami recalled that during the lunch break, Padmini would walk up and down the shooting floor with the script in her hand studying the dialogue over and over and delivering it, giving it different shades of meaning. The film was made on a budget of ₹8 lakh (worth ₹37 crore in 2021 prices). Ganesan and Padmini were paid ₹60,000 each, while Rajakumari was paid mere ₹25,000 as salary.

== Soundtrack ==
The music was composed by Viswanathan–Ramamoorthy. The song "Varugiraal Unnai Thedi" is set to Atana, a Carnatic raga. The song "Mugatthil Mugam Parkkalam" is set to Kalyani. The song "Aarambamavadhu" was remixed in by Ilaiyaraaja in Tharai Thappattai (2016).

Song	Singers	Lyrics	Length
Vanam Poyyaadhu	T. M. Soundararajan	Sitthar Viruththam	00:30
Engal Kula Nayagiye	P. Leela	Kannadasan	05:36
Varugiraal Unnai Thedi	M. L. Vasanthakumari & Soolamangalam Rajalakshmi	Kannadasan	05:35
En Vaazhvil Pudhu Padhai Kanden	P. Susheela	A. Maruthakasi	03:34
Indru Namathullame Pongum	T. M. Soundararajan & Jikki	Pattukkottai Kalyanasundaram	04:30
Eedatra Patthinikku.... Aarambam Avathu Pennukkulle	C. S. Jayaraman & dialogues by Padmini	Pattukkottai Kalyanasundaram	07:22
Pariththa Kannaipadhitthu	P. Leela	Pattukkottai Kalyanasundaram	05:22
Marundhu Vikira Maappillaiku	A. P. Komala & K. Jamuna Rani	Pattukkottai Kalyanasundaram	02:49
En Vaazhvil Pudhu Padhai Kanden (pathos)	P. Susheela	A. Maruthakasi	03:41
Poomalai Pottu Pona Mama	S. C. Krishnan & A. G. Rathnamala	Pattukkottai Kalyanasundaram	02:27
Ondru Patta Kanavanukku	T. S. Bagavathi	Pattukkottai Kalyanasundaram	01:48
Mugatthil Mugam Parkkalam	T. M. Soundararajan & P. Leela	Pattukkottai Kalyanasundaram	02:59
Vizhi Vel	A. P. Komala & K. Jamuna Rani	Udumalai Narayana Kavi	03:00
Illara Maligaiyil	T. S. Bagavathi	Pattukkottai Kalyanasundaram	03:00
Vidhi Enum Kuzhandai	Seerkazhi Govindarajan	Pattukkottai Kalyanasundaram	01:46
Kotravan Madhurai Moodhor	P. Leela	Pattukkottai Kalyanasundaram	03:10

== Release and reception ==
Thanga Padhumai was released on 10 January 1959. The distribution rights were sold to Ramakrishnan Films who did not release the film well in its first run despite it receiving praise for the cast performances and songs, leading to underperformance. However, in its second run, the film was bought by Jayaraman Pictures for ₹25,000 and it did well. Kanthan of Kalki appreciated the film for Ganesan and Padmini's performances, noting it would meet fan expectations. At the 6th National Film Awards, it won the award for Best Feature Film in Tamil – Certificate of Merit.

== Legacy ==
The film's dialogue "Idharkuthane Aasaipattai Balakumara" (Isn't this what you wished for, Balakumara?) inspired the title of a 2013 film.

== Bibliography ==
- Dhananjayan, G. (2014). Pride of Tamil Cinema: 1931–2013. Blue Ocean Publishers. OCLC 898765509.
