= Kannagi statue =

Statue in Chennai, India

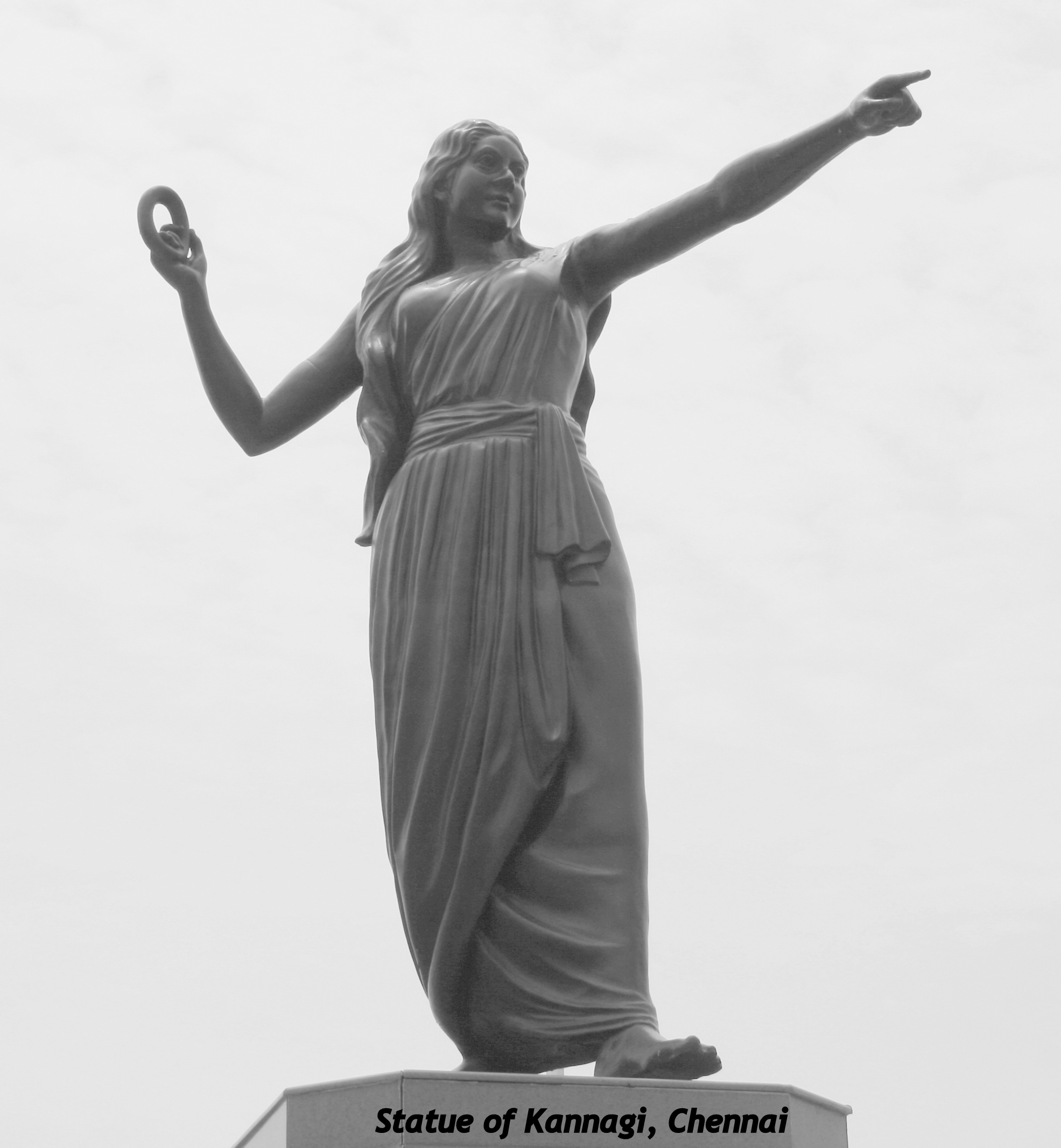
Statue of Kannagi

Kannagi statue is a statue at the Marina Beach, Chennai, India. It is located at the intersection of Bharathi Salai and Kamarajar promenade. On 2 January 1968, it was erected as Kannagi holding an anklet in her hand and demanding justice.

== History ==
In 1967, the Dravida Munnetra Kazhagam (DMK) leader C. N. Annadurai became chief minister of Tamil Nadu. His government conducted second World Tamil Conference in January 1968, Chennai. As part of the conference, the statues of the ten Tamil icons who associated with the history of Tamil literature were erected on the marina beach. This includes 10 foot bronze statue of Kannagi, a female protagonist character in the Silapathikaram, one of the Five Great Epics of Tamil literature.

In May 2001, All India Anna Dravida Munnetra Kazhagam (AIADMK) leader J. Jayalalithaa became chief minister of Tamil Nadu. On 21 September 2001, she resigned due to the corruption charges. In December 2001, the AIADMK government removed the Kannagi statue after a lorry damaged the pedestal of the statue and kept it in the Government Museum, Chennai. While the opposition DMK alleged that the statue removed on the advice of the Jayalalithaa's astrologers as "the statue could bring misfortune to her". DMK leader M. Karunanidhi, as a PWD minister who oversaw the 1968 conference, considered the removal of statue as a "a challenge to Tamil pride". After Karunanidhi come to power in 2006, he re-installed the statue.

== In popular culture ==
The statue is featured in a scene from the film Pasupathi c/o Rasakkapalayam (2007).

== See also ==
- Triumph of Labour
