= Kannagi =

Character in Tamil epic of Cilappatikāram

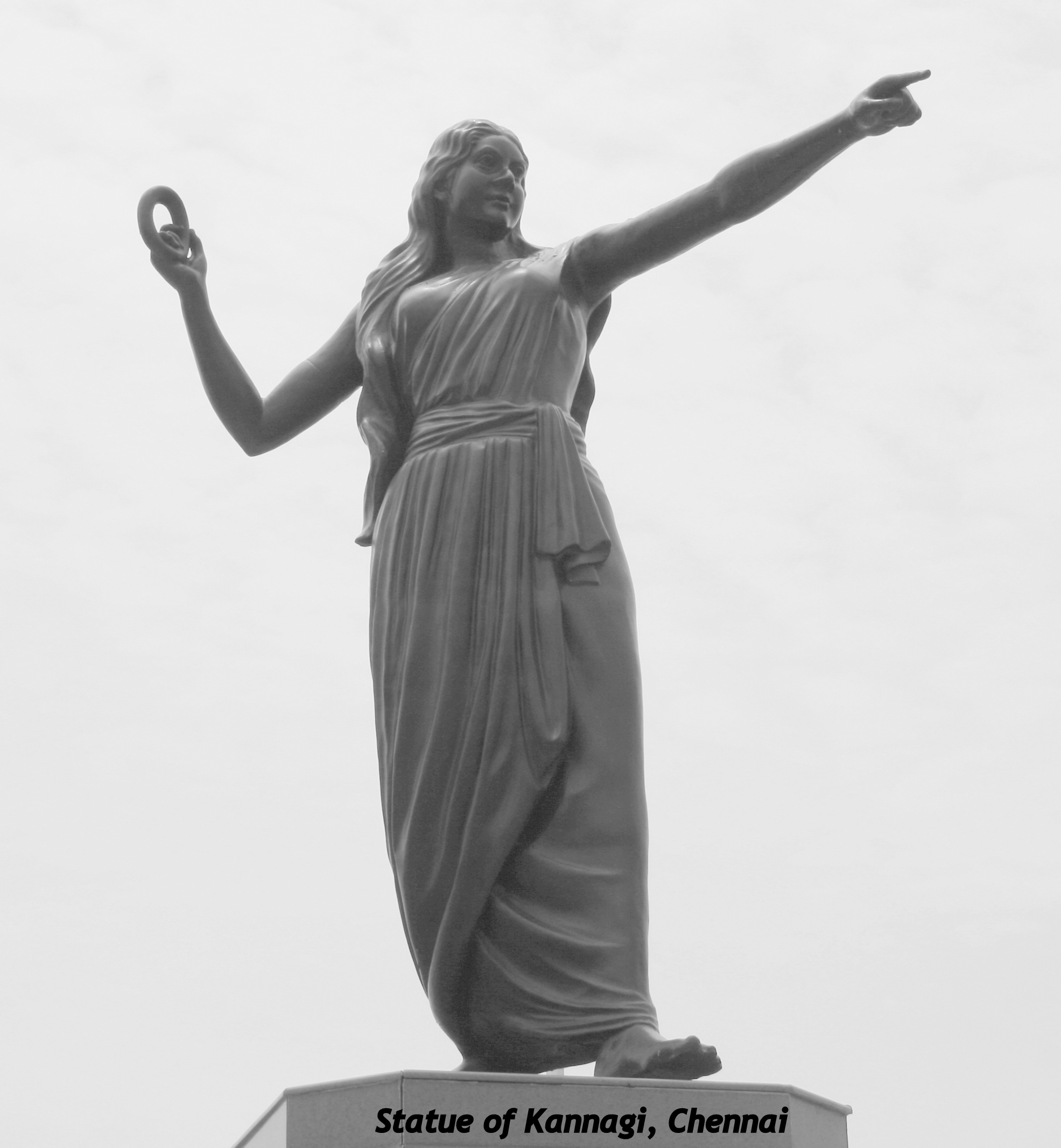
- Statue of Kannagi in Chennai
- First appearance: Naṟṟiṇai

In-universe information
- Gender: Female
- Spouse: Kovalan
- Home: Puhar, Early Chola Kingdom

Kannagi, sometimes spelled Kannaki, is the titual character of the Tamil in Ilango Adigal's Cilappatikaram, one of the Five Great Epics in Tamil literature. She is described as a chaste woman who stays with her husband Kovalan despite his adultery. The epic further describes the couple's attempt to rebuild their marriage after her unrepentant husband had lost everything, how he is framed for a crime that he did not commit, and Kannagi's quest for justice. She later curses the entire Pandya city of Madurai, which is burnt to the ground as a consequence of her curse. In Tamil folklore, Kannagi has been deified as the symbol of chastity, and she is worshipped as a goddess in certain regions in South India and Sri Lanka.

== Literature ==
Kannagi appears in the Sangam era poem Naṟṟiṇai. A more extended version of her character appears in the Cilappatikāram. Cilappatikāram ("the Tale of an Anklet"), is one of the Five Great Epicss in Tamil literature. It is attributed to a Ilango Adigal, a Chera prince turned monk, and was probably composed between 2nd to 6th centuries CE. The epic consists of 5,730 lines, and narrates the tragic story of Kannagi and her husband Kovalan.

== Legend ==
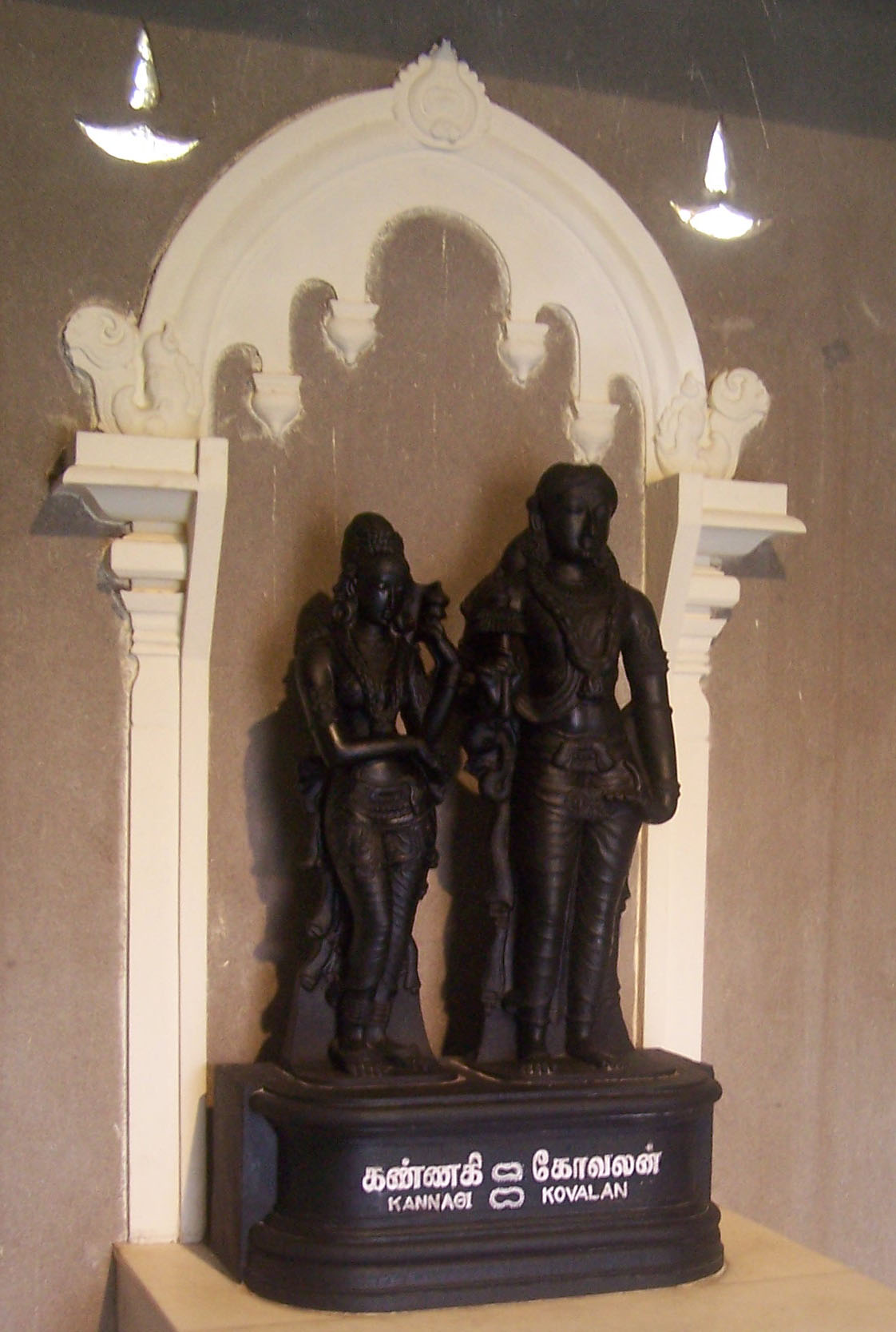
Statues of Kannagi and Kovalan at Poombuhar

Kannagi is the daughter of the merchant and ship captain Manayakan from Puhar. She marries Kovalan, the son of a wealthy merchant Macattuvan. While their married life initially appears happy, Kovalan later becomes attracted to the courtesan and dancer Madhavi. He becomes captivated by her beauty, and enters into an extra marital relationship with her. He spends most of his wealth on her, and the relationship creates tensions with Kannagi.

Kovalan has a misunderstanding with Madhavi, and after losing most of his wealth, he realises his mistake and returns to his wife Kannagi. Kannagi forgives him despite his earlier betrayal, and the couple decides to leave Puhar and travel to the Pandya capital of Madurai to start a new life.

At Madhurai, Kovalan attempts to sell one of the two anklets of Kannagi to raise money. The royal goldsmith, who had earlier stolen an anklet belonging to the queen Kopperundevi, finds the that anklets are similar, and falsely accuses Kovalan of stealing the queen’s anklet. Enraged by the act, the king Neduncheziyan orders Kovalan’s arrest and execution without a fair trial.

After Kovalan is executed, Kannagi appears in the royal court, trying to prove her husband’s innocence and demanding justice. She breaks open her remaining anklet to reveal that her anklet contained rubies whereas queen Kopperundevi's missing anklet contained pearls. When the king realised the truth and his mistake, he kills himself due to remorse. The queen, Kopperundevi, unable to bear the grief and shame caused by the unjust execution, also dies soon afterward.

Kannagi later cursed the city of Madurai, and the entire city was burnt to ground. However, she was calmed by the goddess Meenakshi, and later attained salvation.

== Iconography and worship ==
Kannagi is eulogised as the epitome of chastity and is worshiped as a goddess in select regions in South India and Sri Lanka. Various sculptures and reliefs of Kannagi are found in Hindu temples, which mostly depict her holding an anklet in her hand. She is worshipped as Kannaki Amman by the Sri Lankan Tamils, as Bhagavati in Kerala, and as Pattini in Sinhalese Buddhism.

=== South India ===
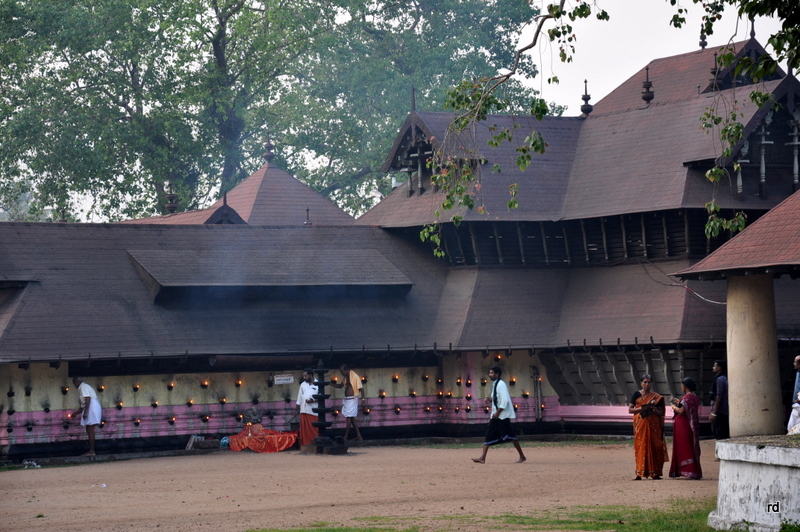
Kodungallur Bhagavathy Temple

The Cilappatikāram, and its sequel Maṇimēkalai, offer evidence that Kannagi was praised as a goddess during the lifetime of Maṇimekalai, the daughter of Kovalan and Madhavi. Cilappatikāram describes that Chera king Senguttuvan deifying Kannagi and dedicating a temple for her. It also describes that the Pandya king Vetrivel Cheliyan prayed to Kannagi, for relieving his lands from the drought and her other curses. These elements indicate that Kannagi was deified in the ancient Tamilakam. However, her worship does not have any significant presence in the religious beliefs and institutional practice of modern-day Tamil Nadu, whereas the cult became prominent in Sri Lanka and parts of Kerala. According to some scholars, Kannagi's worship in Tamil Nadu may have been assimilated into the more common worship of the Dravidian goddess Mariamman. A contemporary interpretation of the Cilappatikāram, which states that the city of Madurai was destroyed on a Friday in the month of Aadi, is often conflated to sustain that hypothesis, as the Fridays of the month of Aadi are closely associated with the cult of Mariamman in Tamil Nadu.

The Kannaki cult initiated by the Cheras, is still preserved in the form of the Bhagavati cult in Kerala. The Bhagavati Temple at Kodungallur, which was the former capital of Cheras, mentions the Kannaki cult in its Sthala purana. Though the deity of the temple is still observed as Bhadrakali, Kannagi is believed to be an incarnation of the goddess, and reached Kodungallur to attain salvation at the location of the temple. Attukal Temple, Mangala Devi Kannagi Temple, and Thirupuraikkal Temple are some of the Bhagavati temples in Kerala, that are associated with the Kannagi cult, and are believed to have been located on the places visited by Kannagi on her journey to Chera Nadu after the burning of Madurai.

=== Sri Lanka ===
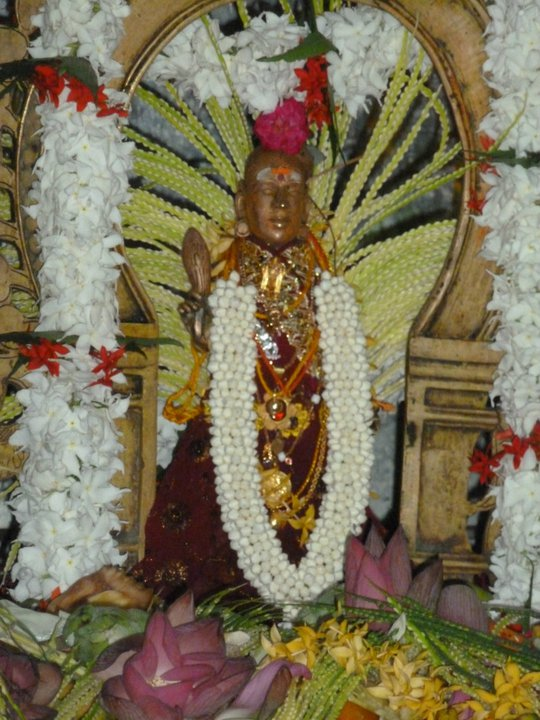
Kannakai's idol in Thambiluvil

According to Sri Lankan folklore, after the burning of Madurai, Kannagi traveled to Kerala and eventually arrived at the island of Pungudutheevu, near the ancient Manipallavam, now known as Nainativu. She is said to have visited approximately 25 sites in Sri Lanka, mainly along the east coast, and before she reached Vattappalai. Disguised as an old woman, she requested food from some herders, and they offered her pongal made from buffalo milk. She later asked for a lamp lit with sea water. Fearing that she was a witch, the boys sought help from the villagers. When the villagers arrived, Kannagi revealed her divine form, displaying 1,000 eyes on her head, declaring herself as Kannagi of Poompuhar, and then ascended to heaven. The villagers light lamps, and offer pongal to her during the annual festival celebrated during the month of Vaikasi. In eastern Sri Lankan folklore, Kannagi Amman’s journey extends to Kataragama, where she comes to realise her divine nature and ascends to heaven. The Tamil month of Vaikasi, from mid-May to mid-June, holds particular significance for her worship in northern and eastern Sri Lanka. In eastern traditions, devotees sing udukkai pādal in her honour and invoke her through silambu attam, a fierce trance dance performed in the goddess’s attire and anklet ornaments (pandaram). This practice bears similarities to the trance dancing of Kodungallur Bharani. Kodungallur being a shrines originally dedicated Kannagi; there, men and women alike dress in attire associated with the goddess and dance while in a trance. Historical sources suggest that king Gajabahu I later recognised Kannagi as Pattini, establishing her as a guardian deity of Sri Lanka.

Kannagi is revered as Kannakai Amman, particularly among the Sri Lankan Tamils of Eastern Sri Lankan and Vanni regions. Yalpana Vaipava Malai, which gives a historical account of the Jaffna Kingdom, attests to the widespread popularity of Kannagi worship during the rule of the Aryacakravarti dynasty (1215–1624) in Northern Sri Lanka. The Sri Lankan epic Kannaki Vaḻakkurai, recited in Kannaki Amman temples, is believed to have been authored by king Jeyaveera Cinkaiariyan (1380–1410), and mirrors the narrative of the Cilappatikāram. The Kannagi cult was particularly strong among coastal communities, who regarded Kannagi as a guardian deity due to her association with sea during her upbringing. During the Portuguese rule, many of these coastal populations converted to Catholicism, and numerous Kannagi shrines were converted into churches. In the 19th century, some of the remaining temples of Kannagi were transformed into Raja Rajeshwari and Bhuvaneshvari temples by activists from the Jaffna-based Shaivism movement, under the leadership of Arumuka Navalar, who actively fought against veneration of Kannagi, whom he considered to be a Jain merchantess. In and around Jaffna, her worship was associated with a five-headed cobra form, peculiarly linked to the local deity Nagapooshani.

Processional Marble statue of Pattini at Nawagamuwa Perahera.

In modern practice, Kannagi is chiefly venerated once a year during the Catangu or Katavu Tirattal festival, majorly celebrated in the Ampara and Batticaloa districts. The festival celebrated over a period of seven days, includes rituals such as kalyana kāl naduthal (planting wedding pillar), valakkurai paaduthal (reciting the verses of Kannaki Vaḻkkurai), kulirthi paaduthal (singing cooling verses). At the conclusion of the festival, the sanctum of the temple is closed and remains so until the next festival begins.

The Sinhalese Buddhists worship Kannagi as Pattini. The story of Kannagi differs from Cilappatikāram and she is revered as an avatar of Gautama Buddha. Kannagi was born in the garden of the Pandyan king, and as she was neglected by him, she grew up at the port of Chola country. She eventually slew the evil Pandyan king, and was later anointed as a guardian god by the Buddha. The Esala Perahera festival was initially dedicated to Kannaki, Kataragama, Natha, and Vishnu, which later incorporated the procession of holy tooth relic of Buddha during the 18th century. Polkeliya (coconut fight), Gammaduwa (village rituals), and ankeliya (horn play) are three main aspects of the Pattini cult.

== In popular culture ==
Tamil films Kannagi (1942), directed by R. S. Mani and Poompuhar (1964) were based on Kannagi's story. Malayalam film Kodungallooramma directed by Kunchacko was released in 1968. Sinhala film Paththini was released on 5 May 2016 in which the role of Kannagi was played by Pooja Umashankar.

A statue of Kannagi holding her anklet, depicting a scene from Cilappatikaram, was installed on Marina Beach, Chennai. It was removed in December 2001 citing reasons that it hindered traffic, and was reinstalled in 2006.

== See also ==
- Lady Meng Jiang
