= Tirutakkatevar =

Tamil poet

Tirutakkatevar was a Tamil Jain poet who wrote Cīvaka Cintāmaṇi, one of The Five Great Epics of Tamil Literature. He, as a local king, also supported Kambar, one of the most famous poets of Tamil literature.

== See also ==
- Tamil Jain
