= Madhavi (Silappatikaram) =

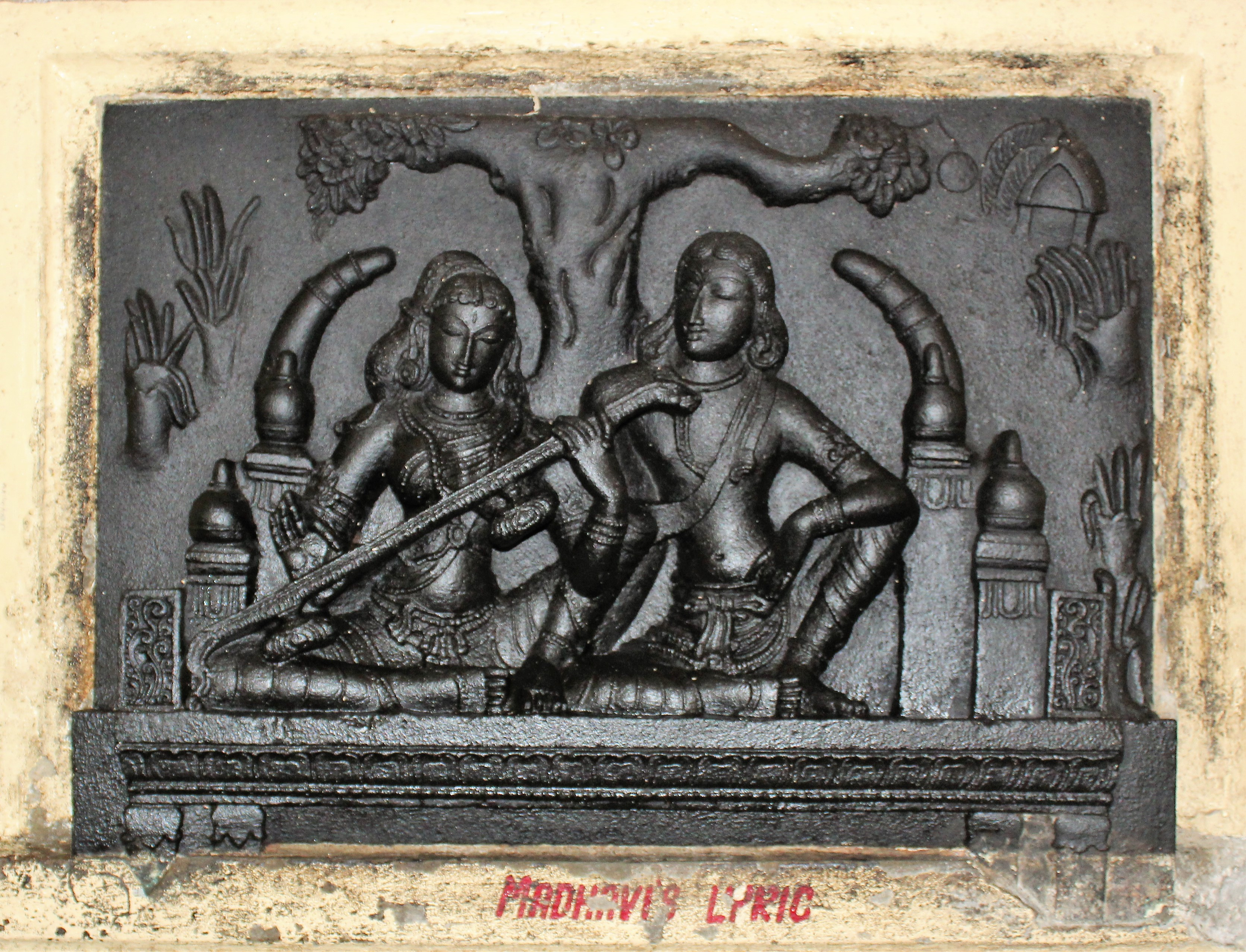
- Madhavi (left) with Kovalan
- First appearance: Cilappatikaram
- Created by: Ilango Adigal

In-universe information
- Gender: Female
- Occupation: Courtesan and dancer
- Children: Manimekalai
- Home: Puhar, Chola Kingdom

Madhavi is a central character in Ilango Adigal's Cilappatikaram, one of the Five Great Epics in Tamil literature. As per the literature, Kovalan, the husband of Kannagi, briefly leaves Kannagi to be with Madhavi. After squandering his wealth, Kovalan returns to Kannagi, and their tragic story form the rest of the epic.

== Literature ==
Cilappatikāram ("the Tale of an Anklet"), is the one of the Five Great Epicss in Tamil literature. It is attributed to a Ilango Adigal, a Chera prince turned monk, and was probably composed between 2nd to 6th centuries CE. The epic consists of 5,730 lines, and narrates the tragic story of Kannagi and her husband Kovalan.

== Legend ==
Madhavi was born in a lineage of courtesans, and was an accomplished Bharatanatyam dancer. She was the daughter of Chitrapathi, a senior courtesan, who was responsible for arranging Madhavi's debut in the king's court and overseeing her wealth and relationships. Madhavi performs in the Chola court and wins royal patronage, which brings her fame and wealth. Kovalan is the son of a wealthy merchant Machattuvan, and lives in the Chola port city of Puhar along with his newly married wife Kannagi. Kovalan meets Madhavi during a festival in the city. Enamoured of her beauty, he falls in love with her. Eventually, Kovalan leaves his wife Kannagi and moves in with Madhavi. Chitrapathi negotiates gifts and patronage from nobles and the wealthy on behalf of her daughter, and manages to accumulate large amount of wealth through Madhavi’s artistic success. When Kovalan becomes involved with Madhavi, Chitrapati initially supports the relationship because Kovalan is a wealthy merchant. However, Kovalan subsequently spends much of his wealth on Madhavi, which ultimately leads to his financial ruin.

After several years of living with Madhavi, Kovalan has a misunderstanding with Madhavi. During a festival performance where Madhavi performs, she sings verses connected with love and separation, which Kovalan misinterprets as referring to another lover of her. Kovalan assumes that Madhavi is being unfaithful and emotionally detached, and abandons Madhavi, despite her attempts to reconcile. Later, Kovalan realises his mistake and returns to his wife Kannagi. After Kovalan leaves Madhavi, Chitrapati becomes angry and disappointed, as the relationship had brought prestige and wealth.

Kovalan and Madhavi have a daughter Manimekalai, who is the protagonist of the epic Manimekalai. Later, Kovalan is killed in Madurai on the orders of king Neduncheziyan. Hence, Madhavi renounces her life as a courtesan and adopts an ascetic life influenced by Buddhist teachings.

== Character ==
According to Kamil Zvelebil, Madhavi's character is considered to be reflection of the life of elite courtesans in the early Tamil society, who were often connected to royals and merchant elites. As per R. Parthasarathy, her role in the epic illustrates the cosmopolitan and artistic culture of the early Tamil cities. Zvelebil also opines that Madhavi was true to Kovalan, and the quarrel was a result of a misunderstanding driven by Kovalan’s emotional instability rather than her betrayal. Some commentators contrast the life of Madhavi with Kannagi, considering them as contrasting symbols, with Madhavi symbolising pleasure and artistic life, and Kannagi symbolising chastity and moral justice. However, as per Sheldon Pollock, Madhavi is a complex literary figure rather than a moral foil, and the epic highlights the social roles of women performers of early South India.
