= Silambu =

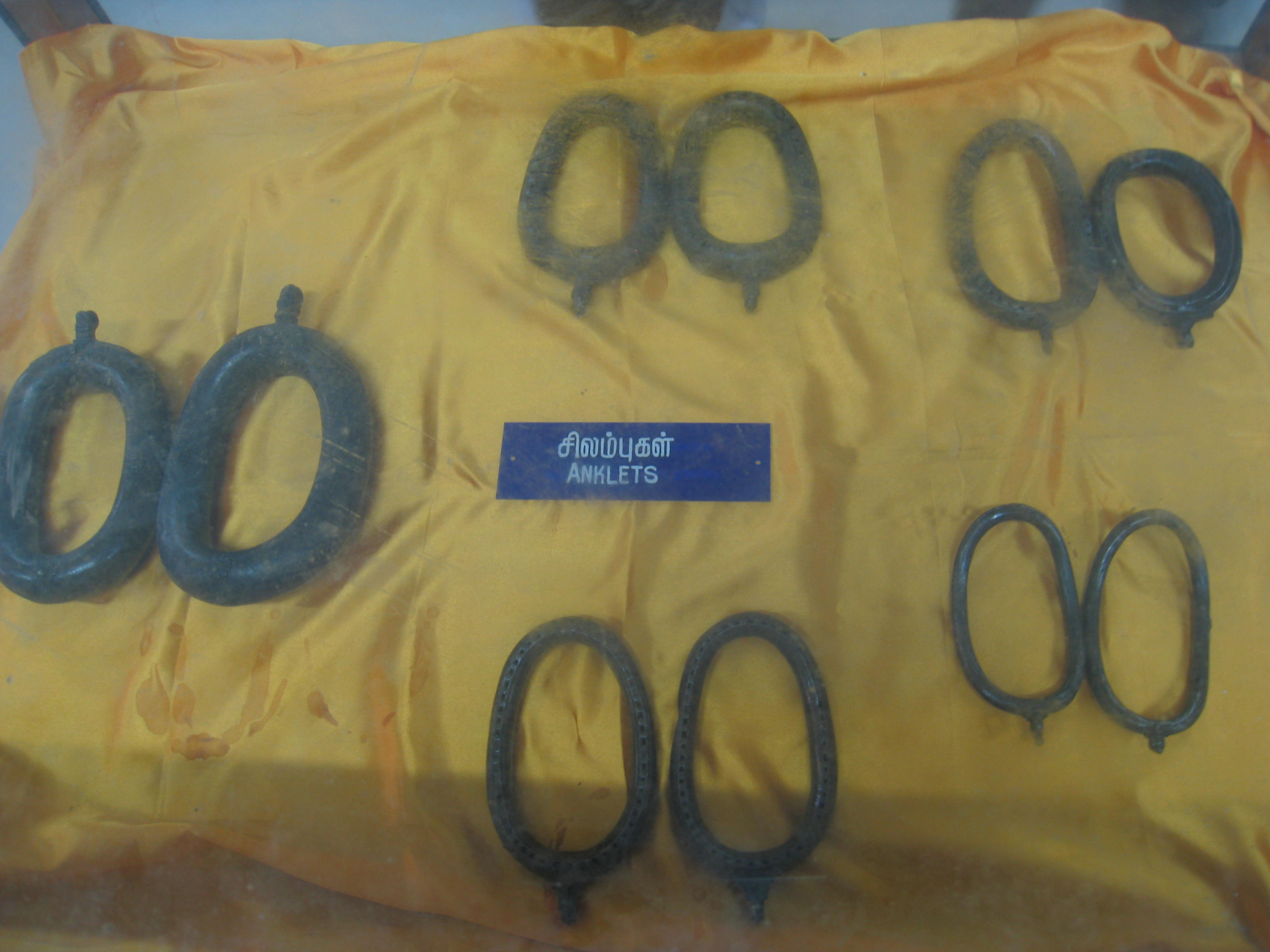
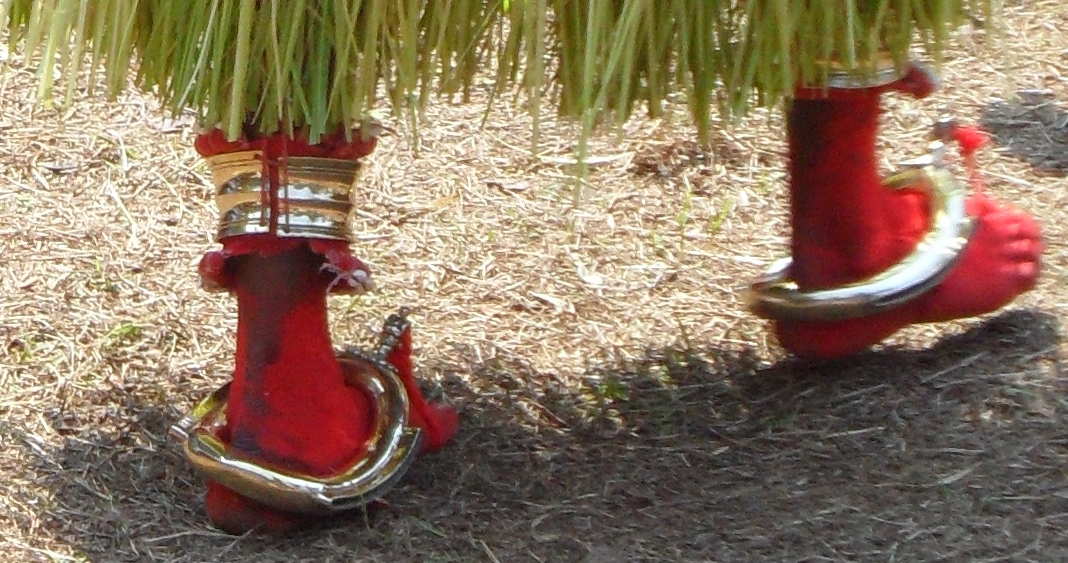
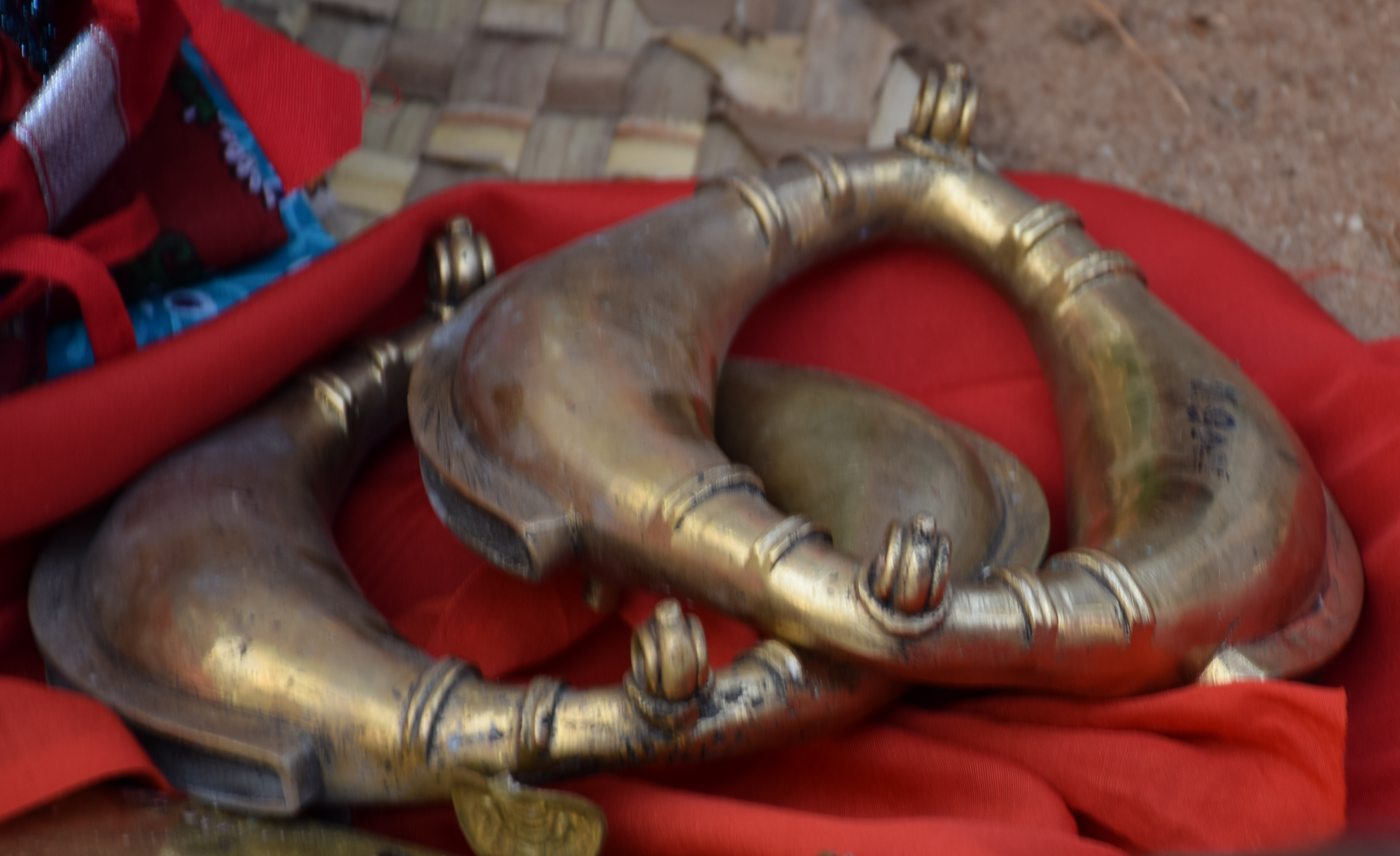
Top to bottom:
A collection of Silambus from Tamil Nadu.
Chilambu used in Theyyam of Kerala.
Gaggara used in Buta Kola of Karnataka.

Silambu (Tamil: சிலம்பு; Malayalam: ചിലമ്പ് /cil’əmpɨ̆/), or Gaggara (Tulu: ಗಗ್ಗರ), is an anklet worn and used in a variety of contexts on the Indian subcontinent.

== Etymology ==
According to Jeyaraj, the word 'silambu' is derived from the verb 'silambal', meaning 'to make sound'.

== Description ==
The silambu is a hollow anklet filled with beads that produce noise when the wearer moves or dances. It may be worn on the ankle or the leg. When worn on the leg, it is termed kālchilambu in Tamil.

Some varieties of silambu are made of copper and use iron balls to produce sound. Others are made of silver.

== Importance ==
=== In dance ===
Nautch performers wore silambu. Kandyan dancers may wear silambu.

=== In art and literature ===
Shiva in his dancing pose nataraja sometimes wears a silambu on his ankle.

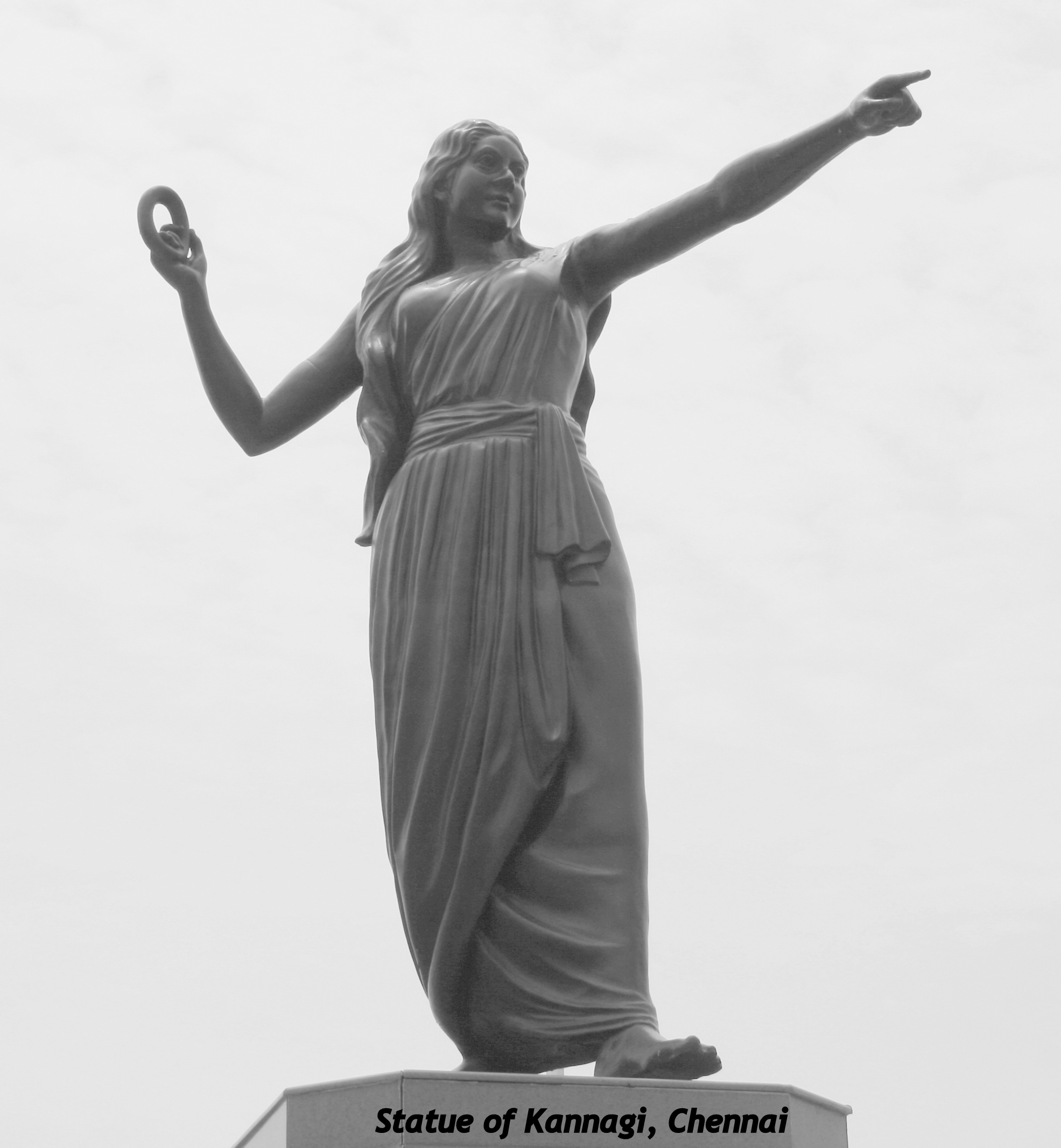
A statue of Kannagi holding a silambu.

The epic Silappatikaram is structured around the character Kannaki's attempt to sell her silambu, and takes its title from the name of the anklet.

=== In religion and rituals ===
Silambu are sometimes placed on cows' legs during the Pongal festival. In Tamil Nadu, a traditional dance called kai silambu aatam is performed in temples during Amman festivals in which the dancers wear or hold silambus in their hands, which make noise when shaken.

Silambu is also used in ritual dance performances of southern India, such as the Theyyam of Malabar region and the Buta Kola of Tulu Nadu region.

== See also ==
- Jewellery of Tamil Nadu

== Sources ==
- Jeyaraj, V. (1999). "Analysis of a Bronze Anklet from Kerala". Museum's Journal. Government Museum, Chennai.
- Sambamoorthy, P. (1976). Catalogue of Musical Instruments Exhibited in the Government Museum, Chennai. Chennai: Principal Commissioner of Museums, Government Museum.
