= Manimekalai =

Tamil epic

Maṇimēkalai (Tamil: மணிமேகலை, lit. 'jewelled belt, girdle of gems'), also spelled Manimekhalai or Manimekalai, is a Tamil Buddhist epic composed by Kulavāṇikaṉ Seethalai Sataṉar probably somewhere between the 2nd century to the 6th century. It is an "anti-love story", a sequel to the "love story" in the earliest Tamil epic Cilappatikaram, with some characters from it and their next generation. The epic consists of 4,861 lines in akaval meter, arranged in 30 cantos.

The title Manimekalai is also the name of the daughter of Kovalan and Madhavi, who follows in her mother's footsteps as a dancer and a Buddhist nun. The epic tells her story. Her physical beauty and artistic achievements seduces the Chola prince Udayakumara. He pursues her. She, a nun of Mahayana Buddhism persuasion, feels a commitment to free herself from human ties. She rejects his advances, yet finds herself drawn to him. She hides, prays and seeks the help of her mother, her Buddhist teacher Aravana Adikal and angels. They teach her Buddhist mantras to free herself from fears. One angel helps her magically disappear to an island while the prince tries to chase her, grants her powers to change forms and appear as someone else. On the island, she receives a magic begging bowl, which always gets filled, from Manimekhala. Later, she takes the form and dress of a married woman in the neighborhood, as the prince pursues her. The husband sees the prince teasing her, and protects "his wife" – Manimekalai-in-hiding – by killing the prince. The king and queen learn of their son's death, order the arrest of Manimekalai, arrange a guard to kill her. Angels intervene and Manimekalai miraculously disappears as others approach her, again. The queen understands, repents. Manimekalai is set free. Manimekalai converts the prison into a hospice to help the needy, teaches the king the dharma of the Buddha. In the final five cantos of the epic, Buddhist teachers recite Four Noble Truths, Twelve Nidanas and other ideas to her. She then goes to goddess Kannaki temple in Vanci (Chera kingdom), prays, listens to different religious scholars, and practices severe self-denial to attain Nirvana (release from rebirths).

The Manimekalai is one of the Five Great Epics of Tamil Literature, and one of three that have survived into the modern age. Along with its twin-epic Cilappatikaram, the Manimekalai is widely considered as an important text that provides insights into the life, culture and society of the Tamil regions (India and Sri Lanka) in the early centuries of the common era. The last cantos of the epic – particularly Canto 27 – are also a window into then extant ideas of Mahayana Buddhism, Jainism, Ajivika, and Hinduism, as well as the history of interreligious rivalries and cooperation as practiced and understood by the Tamil population in a period of Dravidian–Aryan synthesis and as the Indian religions were evolving.

== Author ==
There is no credible information available about the author or the date of its composition. Late sources suggest that the author Seethalai may have been a Buddhist grain merchant and Tamil writer.

The Manimekalai has been variously dated between the 2nd-century and early 9th century by Indian and non-Indian scholars, with early dates favored by Tamil scholars generally allied to the Tamil tradition. A part of the complication is that the Manimekalai contains numerous Hindu Puranic legends, references to gods and goddesses in Hindu and Buddhist traditions, as well as the epic's author's summary sections on various schools of Buddhist, Hindu and Jain philosophies some of whose authors are generally dated to later centuries.

The colonial era Tamil scholar S. Krishnaswami Aiyangar proposed in 1927 that it was either composed "much earlier than AD 400" or "decisively to be a work of the fifth century at the earliest". In 1974, Kamil Zvelebil – a Tamil literature and history scholar, proposed mid 6th-century as the most informed dating, based on the linguistics, internal evidence, the dating of its twin-epic Silappadikaram, and a comparison to other Tamil literature. In his 1989 translation, Alain Daniélou suggests that the text was composed after the first Tamil epic Silappadikaram, but likely in the 2nd- or 3rd century. According to Hikosaka, if some of the events mentioned in the epic partially related to actual historic Chola dynasty events, some portions of the Manimekalai should be dated after 890 CE. According to Paula Richman, the 6th-century dating by Kandaswami and Zvelebil are the most persuasive scholarly analysis of the evidence within the epic as well as the evidence in other Tamil and Sanskrit texts.

== The Epic ==
The Manimekalai builds on the characters of the oldest Tamil epic Silappatikaram (Tamil: சிலப்பதிகாரம்). It describes the story of Manimekalai, the beautiful daughter of Kovalan and Madhavi, in 30 cantos. The Manimekalai is the anti-thesis of the Silappadikaram in focus, style and the propaganda in the two epics. The Silappadikaram is a tragic love story that ultimately becomes supernatural. The Manimekalai is an anti-love story that starts off with supernatural elements. The Silappadikaram builds on human emotional themes and includes some sections praising Jains, while the Manimekalai is Buddhist propaganda that "attacks and ridicules Jainism", according to Kamil Zvelebil.

Notable characters

- Manimekalai - The daughter of Kovalan and Madhavi, who was a Buddhist nun.
- Udayakumara - The Chola prince, who was madly in love with Manimekalai.
- Sudhamati - Manimekalai's most faithful and trustworthy friend.
- Manimekalā - The sea goddess who protects the heroine.
- Aravana Adikal - The Buddhist ascetic teacher (Adikal means "revered/venerable ascetic, saint")

=== Cantos I-VII: Manimekalai in Puhar ===
Canto I

The annual festival in the honor of Indra begins; a description of the Chola city, people and the festival.

Canto II

Manimekalai, her delicate beauty and extraordinary talents introduced in the epic; Kovalan and Kannaki remembered; Manimekalai's mother Madhavi and grandmother Chitrapati learn that Manimekali insists on being a nun, lead a religious life and that she will not dance or otherwise attend the festival; more description of the Chola city, people and the festival.

Canto III

Manimekalai goes to a city garden, away from the festival center, with her friend Sutamati; continued description of the Chola city, people and the festival, mentions a "Jain monk, naked and waving a fly-whisk to avoid hurting unseen fragile insect" as well as "Kalamukhas [a subtradition of Shaivism] wearing oleander flower garlands and rudraksha mala, body smeared with ashes, acting madly".

Canto IV

Manimekalai enters crystal pavilion of the garden; Prince Udayakumara introduced, brave and beautiful; he is told about Manimekalai the dancer and her beauty; the prince heads to find her in the garden; he finds her, pursues her, her friend Sudhamati tries to block him, and he then asks why is she not in a monastery, why in the garden; Sudhamati says, body is simply a vessel of vices, born due to karma of past births; the prince tries to meet Manimekalai, she hides in the crystal pavilion.

Canto V

According to the epic, Manimekalai's beauty rivaled that of the goddess of fortune, Lakshmi as she hid in the crystal pavilion full of statues. Udayakumara sees her, falls for her instantly, wonders if she is real or a perfectly crafted statue. The more she avoids him, the more he wants her. Sudhamati reminds him that Manimekalai is not interested in handsome men like him, because both Manimekalai and she are nuns. Sudhamati describes she is from Bengal, her father a Brahmin who tended fire [Vedic], and they came to the south on a [Hindu] pilgrimage towards Kanyakumari, related to the journey of Rama in the Ramayana. There she joined a Jain monastery. Her father joined her, but one day after an accident her father was bleeding badly. The Jains kicked them both out, afraid that the blood will pollute them. She then became a nun at a Buddhist monastery, and that is where she met nun Manimekalai. The prince left unconvinced, resolving to meet Manimekalai's family to put pressure on her. Manimekalai then confesses she is confused because she wants to be a nun, yet she feels attracted to the prince. The goddess of the seas, Manimekhala, appears. She praises the Buddha, his wheel of dharma, meets the two Buddhist nuns.

Canto VI

A description of Goddess Manimekhala and her powers; she advises the nuns to go to the Chakravala-kottam, that is "Temple of Heaven" – monk gathering spaces with Buddhist mounds – to avoid being chased by the prince. A history of the "Temple of Heaven" follows along with their then-popular name "City of the Dead"; the epic recites the story of a Brahmin named Shankalan enters the mound by mistake at night and is confronted by a sorceress with a skull in her hand accompanied by screaming jackal-like noises, the Brahmin flees in terror, then dies in shock in front of his mother Gotami. The mother goes to the Champapati temple and prays, "take my life, let my son live". Champapati appears and says this was fate, his karma and he will be reborn. The mother questions the four Vedas, the goddess explains the Buddhist theory of samsaras, mount Meru, and realms of rebirth. According to the epic, the feeble mind of Sudhamati barely understands but she feels that Goddess Manimekhala is right. The goddess then casts magic, plunges the two nuns into sleep, thereafter instantly transports Manimekalai alone through air to the island of Manipallavam where her oaths of being a nun would not be threatened by the prince's charms.

Canto VII

The goddess meets the prince and tells him to forget about Manimekalai because she is destined to live a monastic life; She then awakens and meets Sudhamati, tells her Manimekalai is safe on a distant island and to remind her mother Madhavi not to search and worry about her daughter; the goddess then disappeared into the sky; a description of the ongoing festival continues, along with a mention of upset women, infidelities of their husbands, the tired and sleeping young boys and girls who earlier in the day had run around in their costumes of Hindu gods (Vishnu) and goddesses (Durga); Sudhamati walked through the sleeping city, when a stone statue spoke to her and told her that Manimekalai will return to the city in a week with a complete knowledge, like Buddha, of all her past births as well as yours. Sudhamati froze in fear seeing the stone statue talk and what it told her.

=== Cantos VIII-XI: Manimekalai on Manipallavam island ===
Canto VIII

Manimekalai wakes up on the Manipallavam island. She finds herself alone, is confused and afraid. She weeps while walking on the beach, recalls her friend, her father Kovalan who was unjustly executed in Madurai, her mother and all loved ones. Then Manimekalai sees Buddha's footprint pedestal, shining with jewels. She sees some people fighting near it. Buddha appears, orders them to cease fighting, to remember that the pedestal is for him alone and should be worshipped by sages and the powerful.

Canto IX

Manimekalai's fear and worries vanished near the Buddha's footprints. Tears of joy rolled down her cheeks. She suddenly and miraculously remembers all her past lives along with the circumstances, and saddened by her numerous rebirths, her fathers and husbands. The epic mentions she meeting a sage named Brahma Dharma, being a Buddhist in the last birth, of Gandhara, Naganadu, the north city of Avanti, and other locations significant to Indian Buddhism.

Canto X

A goddess appears and says that Buddha appeared when "goodness was no longer found among living beings, people have become deaf to wisdom and true knowledge". She circumambulates around the jeweled Buddha's pedestal clockwise three times. The goddess then meets Manimekalai and gives her more information about her cycles of previous rebirths, including that prince Udayakumar in this life was the king and her husband in the last birth who was rude to a Buddhist monk, but you begged his forgiveness, donated food and obeyed the monk's orders. In this life, therefore, he is a frustrated prince while your merits have made you into a Buddhist nun. She informs her that Madhavi and Sudhamati were her sisters in previous lives, and are now her mother and friend in this life. She then guides her on how to be free of suffering and fears. The goddess asks Manimekalai to study the "deceitful theories of various religions", and teaches her magical mantras (Dharani) to overcome sufferings of ascetic life and hunger. One of the mantras, says goddess, will let her change her appearance into another person and instantaneously travel through air.

Canto XI

A Buddhist protectress goddess Tiva-tilakai (Skt: Dvipa-tilaka) meets Manimekalai. The goddess says, only those who have amassed great merit in past lives and remained Buddhist over their many births are able to see and worship Buddha's footprints in their present life. Tivatilakai mentions that Buddha was born in the month of Vaishaka on the longest day, and every year on Buddha's birthday near a lake a magic bowl appears, called Amrita Surabhi (lit "cow of abundance"). It just happens that Manimekalai is near the lake on that very day, so she can go and get the magic bowl she is destined to receive. With that bowl, she will never run out of food to eat everyday, says Tivatilakai. Manimekalai visits the magical lake and gets the magic bowl. She chants the glory of the Buddha, prostrates before goddess Tivatilakai and the Buddha's footprints. The goddess tells her to meet Aravana Adigal to learn more about the magic bowl and the Buddha dharma.

=== Cantos XII-XVII: Manimekalai returns, meets Adigal ===
Canto XII

Manimekalai returns from the island. Back with her mother and friend Sudhamati in the Chola kingdom, she finds the old Buddhist ascetic Aravana Adigal after several efforts to locate him.

Canto XIII

Manimekalai learns the story of Aputra – the first possessor of the magic bowl, and the Brahmin Abhanjika of Benares (Hindu holy city) where Abhanjika taught the Vedas. A boy named Aputra is accused of stealing a cow, and the cows protect the boy by fighting Abhanjika and other Brahmins, killing one of the Brahmins. Aputra then meets and accuses the Brahmins of twisting the meaning of the Veda verses taught by Brahma born from the navel of Vishnu who holds a golden disc as his weapon. Aputra reminds the Brahmins that the greatest Vedic teachers such as Vasishtha and Agastya were born of low birth. Aputra is labeled as a cow-thief, and his begging bowl is filled with stones when he does his rounds. Aputra leaves the city and reaches Madurai. He sits with his begging bowl inside Madurai's Temple of Lakshmi, the goddess of fortune. The worshippers of Lakshmi are kind and donate much food to the bowl of Aputra, which Aputra shares with the poor, the blind, the deaf and other needy people. The epic mentions the name Kanyakumari and it being a Hindu bathing pilgrimage site.

Canto XIV

Manimekalai learns more about the Aputra story from ascetic Aravana Adigal. Aputra lives in Madurai for many years, begging in the Lakshmi temple. In a particular year, there was famine in the Tamil region when god Indra became angry. During this period of suffering, one day goddess Sarasvati appears and gave him the magic bowl. The epic refers to Sarasvati as the goddess of all things related to mind, and goddess of language, knowledge and arts. The magic begging bowl always fills up every day with mountains of food, which Aputra shares with the needy. The famine continues for 12 years in the Pandya kingdom, yet the bowl always fills up. Aputra, like a boy, mocks Indra because he has the magic bowl to help the needy. Indra takes revenge by making rains plentiful and showering everyone with so much prosperity that no needy were left. No one was poor, and Aputra felt frustrated that he had no one to donate food from his abundant magic bowl to. Then, one day, people of Java (Indonesia) met him. Indra was not generous to them, and many were dying of hunger in Java. Aputra left for Java in a ship. A storm hits the ship, and Aputra lands on Manipallavam island. Aputra died on that island. That is how the magic bowl came to be on that island, and why Manimekalai found the same bowl there.

Canto XV

The Buddhist ascetic tells the nun the story of a generous cow who helped the people of Java in the memory of Aputra. He presents the Buddhist theory of rebirth dependent on the merits earned in previous lives (karma). He recommends that Manimekalai and Sudhamati use the magic bowl in their possession to help the hungry and needy, just like the gods tried to help the cause of good with the amrita they obtained by churning the cosmic ocean [samudra manthan]. The nuns, so convinced, began roaming the streets of Puhar to beg. They then shared the food they collected in the magic bowl with the needy. The epic mentions kingdoms in the Himalayas, Kausambi and Ujjain.

Canto XVI

Ascetic Adikal teaches the nuns about supernatural genies and the tale of trader Shaduvan and his wife Atirai. Shaduvan is reported dead in a sea storm. Atirai tries to kill herself by jumping into a pit with burning wood, but the fire did not harm her. She sees a goddess who tells her that she is unharmed by her fire because her husband is alive on the island of the Naga kingdom. The Nagas welcome him and give him a girl for pleasure. He refuses the girl, and teaches them the Buddha dharma about rebirths and merits. They prostrate before him and invite to take all the gold, diamonds and rubies in shipwrecks near their islands. Shaduvan collects a massive fortune from the wrecks and brings it back to Atirai. The monk teacher explains to Manimekalai that this was all because of merits earned and virtue in the past lives.

Canto XVII

Manimekhalai, with monk Adikal's wisdom, uses magic bowl to help people. She starts a hospice. The epic mentions Rama and Vishnu story from the Ramayana, states that they built a link to Sri Lanka, but a curse of an ascetic dissolved the bridge link. It also mentions stories of people fed from the magic bowl suddenly realizing their past lives. The hospice of Manimekalai is near a Temple of Heaven (Buddhist mounds, gathering place for monks).

=== Cantos XVIII-XXV: Manimekalai meets Udayakumara, he is killed ===
Canto XVIII

Prince Udayakumara visits the hospice of Manimekalai after her grandmother tells the prince where she is. He tells the grandmother how much he adores her, wants her. She says that it is his duty to return her to dance, music and householder role. The prince, driven by his desires and said duty promises her that he will. He confronts Manimekalai. She insists she is and wants to be a nun because the body and human desires are the source of all suffering. After her reply, she used the magic mantra she had learned to convert herself into a look-alike of Kayashandikai – the wife of Vidyadhara. She escapes the prince's pursuit.

Canto XIX

Manimekalai in her new appearance continues to beg with her bowl and help others. She reaches the prison and meets the guards and then king, persuading him to convert the prison into a Buddhist monastery. The king releases all the prisoners, and converts the prison into a monastery.

Canto XX

The prison-turned-monastery adds a temple for the worship of Buddha. Udayakumara learns about it and that Manimekalai was behind the conversion. He goes to see her. While he was on his way, the husband of Kayashandikai-but-in-reality-Manimekalai goes to meet his wife. The husband reaches first. Manimekalai does not recognize him, frowns and refuses his affections. Then the prince arrives and tries his lines on her. She recognizes him, smiles but refuses him too. The "husband" overhears the prince, sees his frowning "wife" smiling at another man, assumes the worst, pulls out his sword and cuts the prince's body into two. The prince dies instantly. The "husband" learns who his wife really is, he is in sorrow. A Buddhist goddess comforts him.

Canto XXI

Manimekalai learns of the death of Udayakumara. She cries. She laments that her husband of "innumerable" previous births is dead because of her decisions, adding that the endless cycles of suffering would continue without her monastic ways. She hopes that Udayakumara will learn from all this in his next birth. A Buddhist genie appears, talks and comforts her. Others recommend that she go to Vanci (Chera kingdom) to learn more about religious traditions and Buddhism.

Canto XXII

The Buddhist monks learn about the killing of the prince. They ask Manimekalai what happened. She tells them everything. They hide the dead body of the prince, confine Manimekalai to her quarters. A monks delegation goes and meets the king. The Buddhist monks tell the king legends of Vishnu, Parashurama and Durga, then the errors of the prince and finally his death. The king thanks them, said he would have executed his son according to his dharma duty to protect the honor of women. He ordered the cremation of his dead son and the arrest of Manimekalai for the deception that caused the misunderstandings.

Canto XXIII

The queen learns of her son's death. She sends an assassin to kill Manimekalai. Buddhist goddesses perform miracles that scares the queen. She asks the king to free the prisoner. Manimekalai comes out of the prison.

Canto XXIV

Aravana Adigal meets the queen. She washes the feet of the Buddhist ascetic to honor him. The ascetic explains the Twelve Nidanas (causation links) doctrine of Buddhism, uses it to explain the loss of her son. He says past lives of her son made him behave inappropriately and led to his death. The ascetic cautions everyone to follow dharma, behave according to it. Manimekalai prostrated before the ascetic and asked everyone gathered including the queen to follow the dharma. She resolves to go to the city of Vanci, after one visit to Manipallavam island.

Canto XXV

Manimekalai disappears, travels through air to reach the island of Manipallavam. Aputra miraculously joins her on the island. They circumambulate the jeweled footprints of the Buddha on the island, then pay homage to it. The king meets his teacher and tells him he wants to renounce, spend his time worshipping Buddha's footprint. The teacher says that would be selfish and wrong, as who will protect the kingdom and world without him. His dharmic duty is to continue. Manimekalai meets him and tells the king that his kingdom suffers without him. He should be in his throne, while she will now spend her time in Vanci.

=== Cantos XXVI-XXX: Manimekalai visits Vanci and Kanci ===
Canto XXVI

Manimekalai flies through air and arrives in the mountainous kingdom's capital Vanci. She first visits the temple of Kannaki and pays her homage to the goddess. The epic mentions the legend of Kalinga kingdom (Odisha).

Canto XXVII

Manimekalai learns about the different schools of Buddhist, Hindu, Jain, Ajivika and Carvaka philosophies. This section and the rest of the epic are "not a philosophical" discussion per se, states Paula Richman, rather it is a literary work. The Buddhist author presents non-Buddhist schools in a form that shows them inconsistent or inferior to Buddhism. According to Zvelebil, this is "Buddhist propaganda" that ridicules the other. The epic mentions Vedic religion and their various epistemological theories (pramana). The Hindu sub-schools mentioned include Vedanta, Mimamsa, Nyaya, Samkhya, Vaisheshika, Shaivism [Shive], Vaishnavism [Vishnu], Brahmavada [Brahma] and Vedavadi [no deity, the Vedas are supreme].

Canto XXVIII

Manimekalai visits Kanci, meets her mother and Aravana Adigal.

Canto XXIX

Aravana Adigal teaches Manimekalai the doctrines of the Buddha dharma.

Canto XXX

Manimekalai learns more Buddhist doctrines. She then puts the theory to practice, performs severe ascetic practices to end her cycles of rebirth and attain Nirvana. According to Anne Monius, this canto is best seen as one dedicated to the "coming of the future Buddha", not in the prophetic sense, rather as nun Manimekalai joining the movement of the future Buddha as his chief disciple. The last canto, along with a few before it, are the epic's statement on the karma theory of Buddhism, as understood by its author, and how rebirths and future sufferings have links to past causes and present events in various realms of existence (samsara).

== Manuscripts and translations ==
The Manimekhalai palm-leaf manuscripts were preserved and found in Hindu temples and monasteries along with those of Silappadikaram. It is the only surviving Tamil Buddhist literary work, though commentary and secondary Tamil literature evidence suggests that there were other Buddhist epics and texts in the Tamil language at least till the 14th century. The reason for its survival, states Richman, is probably its status as the sequel to the Silapathikaram or Sīlappadhikāram. UV Swaminatha Aiyar published a critical edition of the text in 1921.

The first abridged English translation and historical analysis of Manimekalai by R. B. K. Aiyangar in 1928, as Maṇimekhalai in its Historical Setting. Extracts of this, particularly Canto 30, was republished in Hisselle Dhammaratana's Buddhism in South India but with altered terminology.

In 1989, Alain Daniélou with the collaboration of T.V. Gopala Iyer published a complete French translation, then an English translation.

There is also a Japanese translation by Shuzo Matsunaga, published in 1991.

== Significance ==
The epic gives much information on the history of Tamil Nadu, Buddhism and its place during that period, contemporary arts and culture, and the customs of the times. It presents the author's view of the Buddhist doctrine of Four Noble Truths (ārya-satyāni), Dependent Origination (pratītyasamutpāda), mind (citra), goddesses, miracles, mantras, rebirth, merit-making, begging by monks and nuns, helping the poor and needy. The epic provides a view of religious rivalry between Buddhism and Jainism, where Buddhist ideas and propaganda are presented while Jainism is "attacked and ridiculed", according to Zvelebil.

According to Richman, the Manimekalai is a significant Buddhist epic, given its unique status. The summary of Buddhist doctrine in it, particularly in Cantos 27, 29 and 30, present a Tamil literary writer's perspective of Buddhism before it likely died out in Tamil Nadu, in or about the 11th century.

=== Buddhist School Affiliation ===
According to a 1927 thesis of Rao Bahadur Krishnaswāmi Aiyangar, the Manimekalai contains "nothing that may be regarded as referring to any form of Mahayana Buddhism, particularly the Sunyavada as formulated by Nagarjuna". In contrast, in 1978, C.N. Kandaswami stated there is a lot of internal evidence that "Manimekalai explains Mahayana Buddhism, and champions its cause".

According to G John Samuel and others, based in part on the antiquity of the text and theories, it was believed that the epic was from an early Hinayana (Theravada) Buddhist school, but more recent studies suggest that the Buddhist epic Manimekalai belonged to an early form of Mahayana Buddhism influenced by ideas now attributed to scholars such as Vasubandhu, Dignaga, Buddhagosha, Buddhadatta and Dharmapala.

According to Shu Hikosaka – a scholar of Buddhism and Tamil literature, in Manimekalai "there are not only the doctrines of Mahayana Buddhism but also those of Hinayana Buddhism", in an era when monks of these traditions were staying together, sharing ideas and their ideologies had not hardened.

== Reception ==
To some critics, Manimekalai is more interesting than Silappadikaram, states Zvelebil, but in his view the literary quality of Manimekalai is significantly inferior. The story of Manimekalai is overloaded with supernatural events, miraculous goddesses and reads like a propaganda pamphlet of Buddhism. In Silappadikaram, the epic's storyline is served by ethics and religious doctrines. In Manimekalai, states Zvelebil, the ethics, and religious doctrines are served by the epic's storyline. Kannaki is a strong, inspiring tragic character that grabs the audience's interest. In contrast, Manimekalai is a rather feeble character, says Zvelebil.

According to a review by the Brahmin scholar Subrahmanya Aiyar in 1906, Manimekalai in puritan terms is not an epic poem, but a grave disquisition on philosophy. He states that the three surviving Tamil epics including Manimekalai, on the whole, have no plot and are not epic-genre texts. The Manimekalai is a Buddhistic work of an "infant society sensitive to higher influences of life", and inferior to the Silappadikaram that he calls as the work of a "Hindu poet".

=== Ramayana Reference ===
Like the Silappatikaram, this epic also makes several references to the Ramayana, such as a setu (bridge) being built by monkeys in canto 5, line 37 (however the location is Kanyakumari rather than Dhanushkodi). In another reference, in canto 17, lines 9 to 16, the epic talks about Rama being the incarnate of Trivikrama or Netiyon, and he building the setu with the help of monkeys who hurled huge rocks into the ocean to build the bridge. Further, canto 18, lines 19 to 26, refers to the illegitimate love of Indra for Ahalya the wife of Rishi Gautama(Pandian, 1931, p.149)(Aiyangar, 1927, p.28). This seems to indicate that the story of the Ramayana was familiar in the Tamil land since very early times and Rama was acknowledged as a God, even before the Kamba Ramayanam of the 12th century.

== See also ==
- Tamil Jain
- Five Great Epics
- Tamil Buddhism

== Bibliography ==
- N. Balusamy, Studies in Manimekalai, Madurai: Athirai Pathippakam, 1965.
- Brenda E.F. Beck. The three twins : the telling of a South Indian folk epic, Bloomington, Indiana University Press, 1982.
- Manimekhalai: the dancer with the magic bowl, translated by Alain Danielou, Penguin Books, 1993, ISBN 9780811210980
- Hisselle Dhammaratana, Buddhism in South India, Kandy, 1964. Available online at Buddhist Publication Society Online Library Buddhism in South India
- Gaur A. S. and Sundaresh, Underwater Exploration off Poompuhar and possible causes of its Submergence, 1998, Puratattva, 28: 84–90. Available online at
- Hikosaka, Shu (1989), Buddhism in Tamilnadu: a new perspective, Madras: Institute of Asian Studies
- K. Kailasapathy, Tamil Heroic Poetry, Oxford: Clarendon Press, 1968.
- S.N. Kandaswamy, Buddhism as expounded in Manimekalai, Annamalainagar : Annamalai University, 1978.
- Lal, Mohan; Sāhitya Akādemī (2001). The Encyclopaedia Of Indian Literature (Volume Five) (Sasay To Zorgot), Volume 5. New Delhi: Sāhitya Akādemī. ISBN 81-260-1221-8.
- Mukherjee, Sujit (1999). A Dictionary of Indian Literature: Beginnings-1850. New Delhi: Orient Longman Limited. ISBN 81-250-1453-5.
- Pillai, M. S. Purnalingam (1994). Tamil Literature. Asian Educational Services. p. 115. ISBN 978-81-206-0955-6.
- R. Kasirajan, Evolution and evaluation of epics in Tamil, Madurai: Mathy Pathippakam, 1990.
- Krishnaswami Aiyangar, Manimekhalai in its historical setting, London: Luzac & Co., 1928. Available at
- R. Natarajan, Manimekalai as an Epic, Madras, 1990.
- Panicker, K. Ayyappa (2003). A Primer of Tamil Literature. New Delhi: Indira Gandhi National Centre for the Arts. ISBN 81-207-2502-6.
- P. Pandian (Bacon), Cattanar's Manimekalai translated from the Tamil, Madras: South India Saiva Siddhanta Works Publishing Society Ltd., 1989.
- R. Parthasarathy, The Cilappatikaram of Ilanko Atikal : an epic of South India, New York: Columbia University Press, 1993. Series title: Translations from the Asian classics.
- Rao, S.R. "Marine archaeological explorations of Tranquebar-Poompuhar region on Tamil Nadu coast" in Journal of Marine Archaeology, Vol. II, July 1991, pp. 6. Available online at
- Paula Richman (2003), Cīttalai Cāttanār, Manimekhalai summary in Karl H. Potter ed., The Encyclopedia of Indian Philosophies, Volume IX: Buddhist philosophy from 350 to 600 A.D., Motilal Banarsidass, pp. 457–462, with notes on 610–612
- Paula Richman, Women, branch stories, and religious rhetoric in a Tamil Buddhist text, Syracuse University, 1988. Series title: Foreign and Comparative Studies. South Asian series no. 12.
- Peter Schalk, editor-in-chief, A Buddhist woman's path to enlightenment : proceedings of a Workshop on the Tamil Narrative Manimekalai, Uppsala University, 25–29 May 1995. Uppsala, Academiae Ubsaliensis, Stockholm, 1997. Series title: Acta Universitatis Upsaliensis. Historia religionum 13.
- S.V. Subramanian, Descriptive grammar of Cilappatikaram, Madras, 1965.
- Subrahmanya V Subrahmanya Aiyar (1906). Calcutta review, Volume 123. London: The Edinburgh Press..
- Takanobu Takahashi (1995). Tamil Love Poetry and Poetics. BRILL Academic. ISBN 90-04-10042-3.
- Eva Maria Wilden (2014). Manuscript, Print and Memory: Relics of the Cankam in Tamilnadu. Walter de Gruyter. ISBN 978-3-11-035276-4.
- Kamil Zvelebil (1973). The Smile of Murugan: On Tamil Literature of South India. BRILL. ISBN 90-04-03591-5.
- Kamil Zvelebil (1974), Tamil Literature, Otto Harrassowitz Verlag, ISBN 978-3-447-01582-0
- Zvelebil, Kamil (1992). Companion studies to the history of Tamil literature. BRILL. p. 73. ISBN 90-04-09365-6.
- C. P. Rajendran and others, Geoarchaeological Evidence of a Chola-Period Tsunami from an Ancient Port at Kaveripattinam on the Southeastern Coast of India, Geoarchaeology: An International Journal, 2011.
