= Five Great Epics =

Tamil epic poems

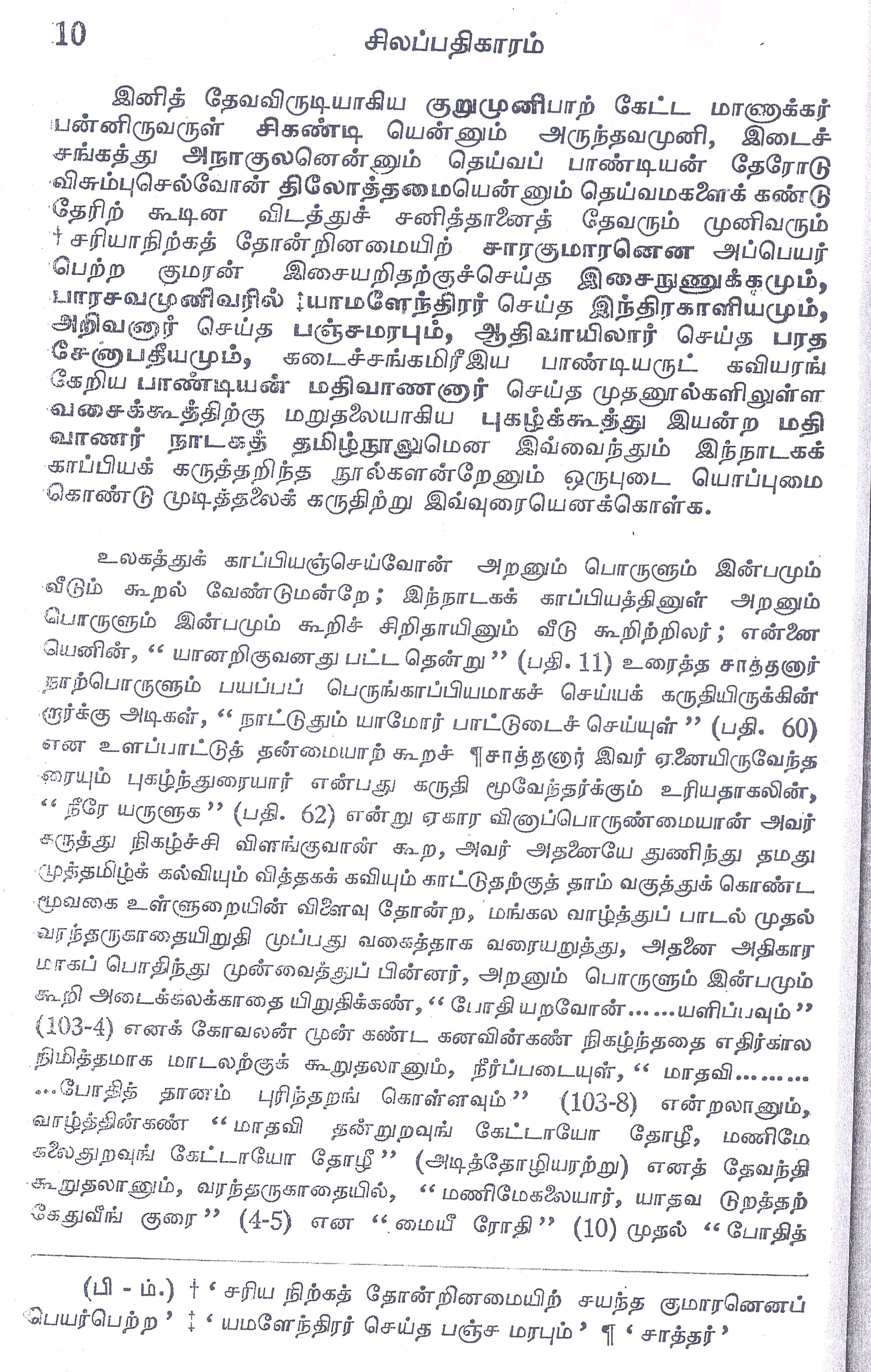
Commentary on Silappathikaram

The Five Great Epics (Tamil: ஐம்பெருங்காப்பியங்கள், romanized: Aimperumkāppiyaṅkaḷ) are five Tamil epics according to later Tamil literary tradition. They are Cilappatikāram, Manimekalai, Cīvaka Cintāmaṇi, Valayapathi and Kundalakesi.

Three of the five great epics of Tamil literature are attributed to Tamil Jains, while two are attributed to Tamil Buddhists. Cīvaka Cintāmaṇi, Cilappathikāram, and Valayapathi were written by Tamil Jains, while the Manimekalai and Kundalakesi were authored by Buddhists. The first mention of the Aimperumkappiyam "five large epics" occurs in Mayilainathar's commentary, the Nannūl. However, Mayilainathar does not mention their titles. The titles are first mentioned in the late-18th-to-early-19th-century work Thiruthanikaiula. Earlier works like the 17th-century poem Tamil vidu thoothu mention the great epics as Panchkavyams. Among these, the last two, Valayapathi and Kundalakesi are not extant.

These five epics were written between the 5th to 10th centuries and act and provide historical information about the society, religions, culture and academic life of Tamil people over that period. Cīvaka Cintāmaṇi introduced long verses called virutha pa in Tamil literature, while Cilappatikāram used akaval meter (monologue), a style adopted from Sangam literature.

== Collection ==
No	Name	Author	Date
1	Cilappatikāram	Ilango Adigal	5th or 6th century CE
2	Manimekalai	Sīthalai Sāttanār	after Cilappatikaram, 6th or 7th century
3	Cīvaka Cintāmaṇi	Tirutakkatevar	early 10th century
4	Valayapathi	An unknown poet	10th century
5	Kundalakesi	Nadakuthanar	c. 10th century

== Theme and contents ==
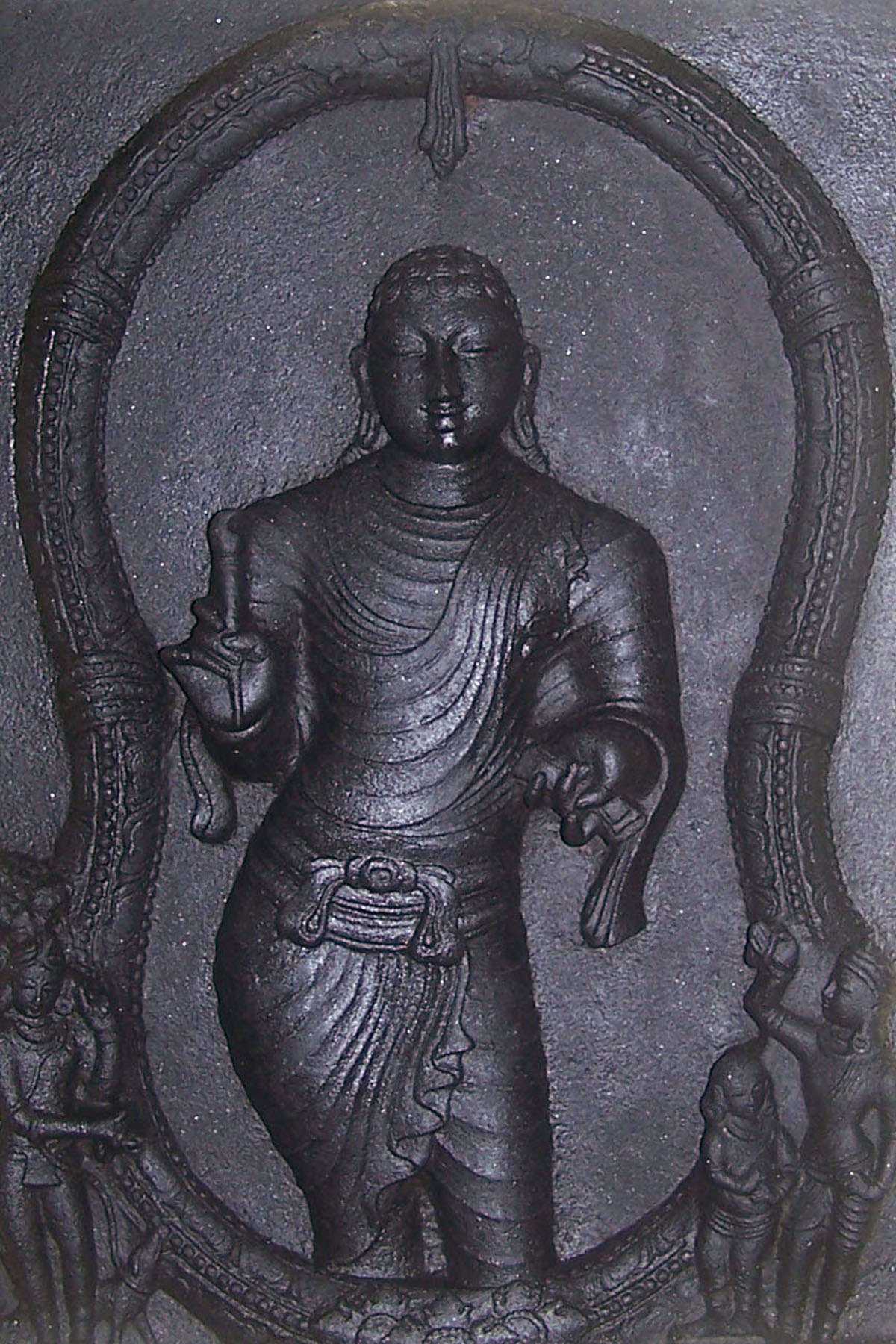
Ilango Adigal is the author of Silappatikaram, one of the five great epics of Tamil literature.

=== Cilappatikāram ===
Cilappatikāram also referred to as Silappathikaram or Silappatikaram, is the earliest Tamil epic. It is a poem of 5,730 lines in almost entirely akaval (aciriyam) meter and is a tragic love story of a wealthy couple, Kannaki and her husband Kovalan. It is set in Poompuhar a seaport city of the early Chola kingdom. Kannaki and Kovalan are a newly married couple, blissfully in love. Over time, Kovalan meets Madhavi – a courtesan and falls for her, leaves Kannaki and moves in with Madhavi. He spends lavishly on her. Kannaki is heartbroken, but as the chaste woman, she waits despite her husband's unfaithfulness. During the festival for Indra, the rain god, there is a poem recital competition. Kovalan recites a poem about a woman who hurt her lover. Madhavi then recites a song about a man who betrayed his lover. Each debated on what is the chasity? and how a woman should be treating her husband. Each interprets the song as a message to the other. Kovalan feels Madhavi is unfaithful to him, leaves her, returns to Kannaki. Kovalan is poor, they move to Madurai, and try to restart their life. Kannaki gives him one from her pair of jeweled anklets to sell and raise capital. Kovalan sells it to a merchant who grows suspicious of the stranger and falsely accuses of theft of the queen' jeweled anklet which is also missing. The king orders his execution, hurrying the checks and processes of justice. Kannaki learns what has happened. She protests the injustice and then proves Kovalan's innocence by breaking the remaining anklet of the pair in the court . The king accepts his mistake. Kannaki curses the king and the people of Madurai, tears off her left breast and throws it at the gathered public. The king dies of heartbreak and the city of Madurai is burnt to the ground. In the third section of the epic, gods and goddesses meet Kannaki and she goes to heaven with god Indra. The royal family of the Chera kingdom learns about her, resolves to build a temple with Kannaki as the featured goddess. They go to the Himalayas, bring a stone, carve her image, call her goddess Pattini, dedicate a temple, order daily prayers, and perform a royal sacrifice.

=== Manimekalai ===
Manimekalai, also spelled Manimekhalai or Manimegalai, Manimekalai, is a Tamil epic composed by Kulavāṇikaṉ Cittalaic Cātaṉār (குல வணிகன் - சீத்தலைச் சாத்தனார்) probably around the 6th century. It is a Buddhist "anti-love" sequel to the Cilappatikaram, with some characters from it and their next generation. The epic consists of 4,861 lines in akaval meter, arranged in 30 cantos. Manimekalai is the daughter of Kovalan and Madhavi, who follows in her mother's footsteps as a dancer and a Buddhist nun. The epic tells her story. Her physical beauty and artistic achievements seduces the Chola prince Udhayakumara. He pursues her. She, a nun of Mahayana Buddhism persuasion, is committed to free herself from human ties. She rejects his advances, yet finds herself drawn to him. She hides, prays and seeks the help of her mother, her Buddhist teacher Aravana Adikal and angels. They teach her Buddhist mantras to free herself from fears. One angel helps her magically disappear to an island while the prince tries to chase her, grants her powers to change forms and appear as someone else. On the island, she receives a magic begging bowl. Later, she takes the form and dress of a married woman in the neighborhood, as the prince pursues her. The husband sees the prince tease her, and protects "his wife" – Manimekalai-in-hiding – by killing the prince. The king and queen learn of their son's death, order the arrest of Manimekalai, arrange a henchman to kill her. Angels intervene and Manimekalai miraculously disappears as others approach her, again. The queen understands and repents. Manimekalai is set free. Manimekalai converts the prison into a hospice to help the needy, teaches the king the dharma of the Buddha. In the final five cantos of the epic, Buddhist teachers recite main doctrines of Buddhism. She goes to goddess Kannaki temple in Vanci (Chera kingdom), prays, listens to different religious scholars, and practices severe self-denial to attain Nirvana (release from rebirths).

=== Cīvaka Cintāmaṇi ===
Cīvaka Cintāmaṇi, an epic of the 10th century CE was written by Thiruthakka Thevar, a Jain monk. The epic is organized into 13 cantos and contains 3,145 quatrains in viruttam poetic meter. It narrates a supernatural fantasy story of a prince who is the perfect master of all arts, perfect warrior and perfect lover with numerous wives. The epic begins with the story of a treacherous coup, where the king helps his pregnant queen escape in a peacock-shaped air machine but is himself killed. The queen gives birth to a boy. She hands him over to a loyal servant to raise and becomes a nun herself. The boy grows up into a super-human man perfect in every art, every skill, every field of knowledge. He excels in war and peace, kills his enemies, wins over and marries every pretty girl he meets, then regains the kingdom his father had lost. After enjoying power, sex and begetting many sons with his numerous wives, he renounces the world and becomes a Jain ascetic.

=== Kundalakesi ===
The Kundalakesi epic has partially survived into the modern age in fragments, such as in commentaries written centuries later. From these fragments, it appears to be a tragic love story about a Hindu or Jain girl of merchant caste named Kundalakesi who falls in love with Kalan – a Buddhist criminal on a death sentence. The girl's rich merchant father gets the criminal pardoned and freed, the girl marries him. Over time, their love fades and they start irritating each other. During an argument, Kundalakesi reminds him of his criminal past which angers Kalan. A few days later, he invites her to a hike up a hill. When they reach the top, he tells her that he will now kill her. The wife requests that he let her circumambulate him – her husband – three times, before killing her and he agrees. When she is behind him, she pushes her husband over into the valley below to his death. She feels remorse for her actions and pines for the boy she once fell in love with and married. She meets teachers of various religious traditions, adopts Buddhism, renounces and becomes a nun, then achieves Nirvana.

=== Vaḷaiyāpati ===
Vaḷaiyāpati is another lost work, that has survived in fragments as quoted in other Tamil texts. There is no actual story for Vaḷaiyāpati or Valayapathi. The story that is popularly spread in books and the Internet has no connection with the poem or its core moral. Through some misinterpreted oral and written traditions, the Vaḷaiyāpati poem got a story and no one has challenged it yet. According to the mystical story - It is a story of a father known as Navakodi Narayanan who has two wives, abandons his second wife from lower caste who gives birth to their son, and the son grows up and seeks his real father. The available content and the commentaries that mention Valayapathi, suggest that it was partly a Jain text that disputed and criticized other Indian religions, that it supported the ideologies found in early Jainism, such as asceticism, horrors at meat consumption, and monastic aversion to women. It is therefore "almost certain" to be a Jain epic, written by a Jain ascetic, states Kamil Zvelebil – a Tamil literature scholar. However, the substantial sections on Shaivism have led to uncertainty.

== Style ==
The great Tamil commentator Atiyarkkunallar (12th–13th century CE) wrote that poems were of two kinds – Col thodar nilai ceyyuḷ (சொல் தொடர் நிலை செய்யுள்) or poems connected by their formal properties and Poruḷ toṭar nilai ceyyuḷ (பொருள் தொடர் நிலை செய்யுள்) or poems connected by content that forms a unity. Cilappatikāram, the Tamil epic is defined by Atiyarkkunallar as Iyal icai nāṭaka poruḷ toṭar nilai ceyyuḷ (இயல் இசை நாடக பொருள் தொடர் நிலை செய்யுள்), poems connected by content that unites with elements of poetry, music and drama. Such stanzas are defined as kāvya and kappiyam in Tamil. In Mayilainathar's commentary (14th century CE) on the grammar Naṉṉūl, there is the first mention of aimperumkappiyam, the five great epics of Tamil literature.

Each of these epics have long cantos, like in Cilappatikāram, which has 30 referred as monologues sung by any character in the story or by an outsider as his monologue related to the dialogues he has known or witnessed. It has 25 cantos composed in akaval meter, used in most poems in Sangam literature. The alternative for this meter is called aicirucappu (verse of teachers) associated with verse composed in learned circles. Akaval is a derived form of verb akavu which means "to call" or "beckon". Cilappatikāram is an example of the claim that folk songs institutionalised literary culture with the best-maintained cultures rooted in folk origin. Manimekalai is an epic in ahaval metre and is noted for its simple and elegant description of natural scenery. Cīvaka Cintāmaṇi is one of the earliest works of Tamil literature in long verses called virutha pa.

== Five minor Tamil epics ==
Similar to the five great epics, Tamil literary tradition classifies five more works as Ainchirukappiyangal (Tamil: ஐஞ்சிறுகாப்பியங்கள்) or five minor epics. The five lesser Tamil epics are Neelakesi, Naga Kumara Kaviyam, Udhyana kumara Kaviyam, Yashodhara Kaviyam and Culamani.

== Historiography ==
U. V. Swaminatha Iyer (1855–1942 CE) resurrected the first three epics from neglect and wanton destruction of centuries. He reprinted the literature present in the palm leaf form to paper books. Ramaswami Mudaliar, a Tamil scholar first gave him the palm leaves of Cīvaka Cintāmaṇi to study. Swaminatha Iyer faced difficulties in interpretation, missing leaves, textual errors and unfamiliar terms. He set for journeys to remote villages in search of the manuscripts. After years of toil, he published Cīvaka Cintāmaṇi in book form in 1887 CE followed by Cilappatikāram in 1892 CE and Manimekalai in 1898 CE. Along with the text, he added much commentary and explanatory notes of terms, textual variations and context.

=== Criticism and comparison ===
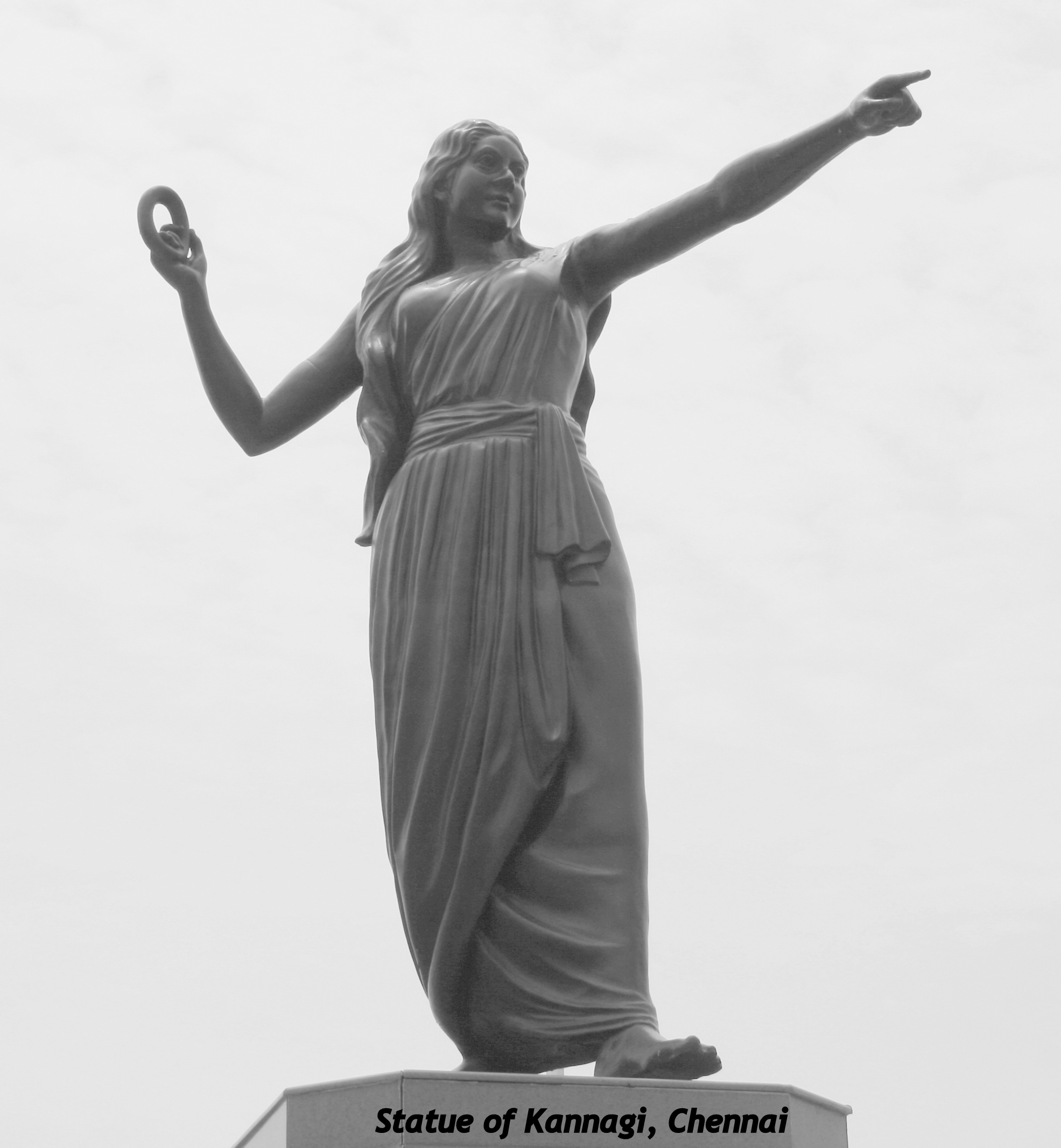
Statue of Kannagi at Chennai Marina Beach.

"After the last line of a poem, nothing follows except literary criticism," observes Iḷaṅkō in Cilappatikāram. The postscript invites readers to review the work. the five poems are criticized for being unfamiliar and difficult to understand. To some critics, Maṇimēkalai is more interesting than Cilappatikāram, but in literary evaluation, it seems inferior. The story of Maṇimēkalai with all its superficial elements seems to be of lesser interest to the author whose aim was pointed toward spread of Buddhism. In the former, ethics and religious are artistic, while in the latter reverse is the case. Maṇimēkalai criticizes Jainism and preaches the ideals of Buddhism, and human interest is diluted in supernatural features. The narration in akaval meter moves on in Maṇimēkalai without the relief of any lyric, which are the main features of Cilappatikāram. Maṇimēkalai in puritan terms is not an epic poem, but a grave disquisition on philosophy.

There are effusions in Cilappatikāram in the form of a song or a dance, which does not go well with the Western audience as they are assessed to be inspired on the spur of the moment. Calcutta review claims that the three works on a whole have no plot and insufficient length characterization for an epic genre. They believe plot of Cīvaka Cintāmaṇi is monotonous and deficient in variety in strength and character and does not stand the quality of an epic.

== Popular culture ==
There have been multiple movies based on Silappathikaram. The most famous is the portrayal of Kannagi by actress Kannamba in the 1942 Tamil movie Kannagi with P.U. Chinnappa as Kovalan. The movie faithfully follows the story of Silappathikaram and was a hit when it was released. The movie Poompuhar, penned by M. Karunanidhi, is also based on Silapathikaram. There are multiple dance dramas as well by some of the exponents of Bharatanatyam (a South Indian dance form) in Tamil as most of the verses of Silappathikaram can be set to music.

Maṇimēkalai has been shot as a teleserial in Doordarshan.

== See also ==
- Tamil literature
