= Ilango Adigal =

Ancient Tamil poet

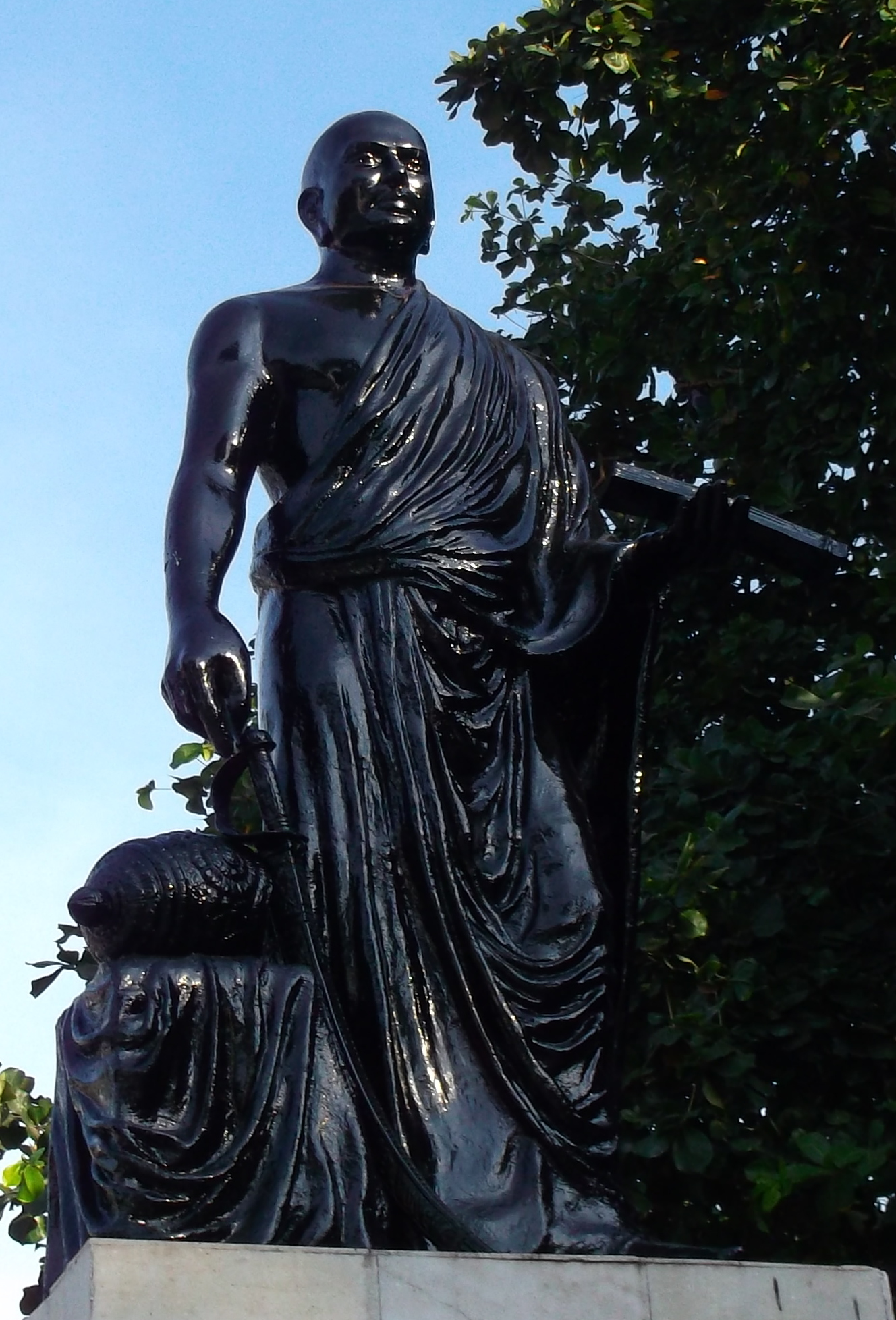
- Statue of Ilango Adigal at Marina Beach, Chennai.
- Native name: இளங்கோ அடிகள்
- Born: c. 4th-6th century CE
- Occupation: Jain monk
- Language: Tamil
- Genre: Epic
- Notable works: Cilappatikaram

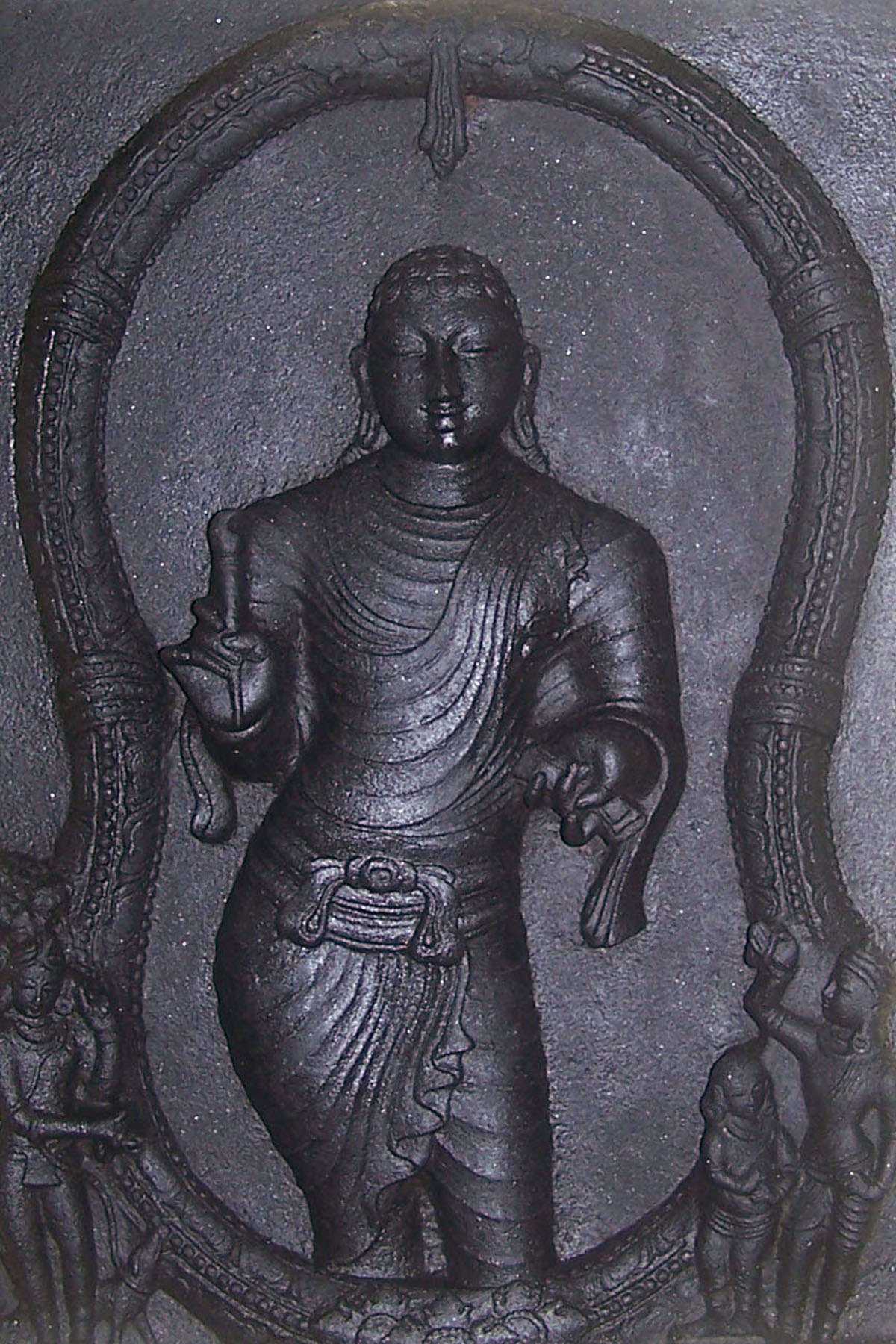
Relief sculpture of Ilango Adigal, in the Silappathikara Art Gallery, Poombuhar, Tamil Nadu.

Ilango Adigal (a title, literally "prince ascetic", fl. c. 4th-6th century CE) was a Jain monk, belonging to the Chera royal family, from the city of Vanci in southern India. He is traditionally credited as the author of the epic poem Cilappatikaram (the Song of the Anklet), one of the Five Great Epics of Tamil literature.

In the patikam (the prologue) to Cilappatikaram, Ilango Adigal identifies himself as the brother of the Chera king Cenguttuvan (c. late 2nd century CE). However, it is generally assumed that the Adigal was a member of the Chera family who lived much later than Cenguttuvan and composed the poem based on a reliable version of the historical tradition concerning Cenguttuvan and Kannagi, the central figure of the epic.

== Biography ==
No directly verifiable information about Ilango Adigal exists outside of Cilappatikaram ("The Lay or Song of the Anklet") and its prologue (the patikam).

According to the text, Ilango Adigal was a Chera prince ("Kudakko Ceral Ilango") from southern India. He was the younger son of the Chera king "Imayavarampan" Ceralatan and Conai/Nalconai of the Chola dynasty. His elder brother was Cenguttuvan, the future warrior-king from the Chera family.

Ilango is said to have renounced royal life after a soothsayer informed the Chera court that the younger prince was destined to succeed his father. To avoid this "fate", he chose the path of asceticism and became a Jain monk, residing in a monastery called "Kunavayirkottam", located outside the Chera capital of Vanci.

It was likely another poet, Cattanar — a friend of Ilango — who discussed the legend of Kannagi with him and inspired the creation of the epic poem. Notably, in several sections of the Cilappatikaram, the main characters are depicted as encountering a Jaina monk or nun.

=== Legacy ===
The epic Cilappatikaram — credited to Ilango Adigal — inspired another Tamil poetic work titled Manimekalai, which serves as its sequel. Manimekalai centers on the daughter of Kovalan, the protagonist of Cilappatikaram, and Madhavi, the dancing girl who had an affair with him.

== Historic dating ==
The dating of Ilango Adigal, the author, to early historic or the Sangam period south India remains uncertain. This is primarily due to the absence of any mention of Ilango Adigal in the Fifth Ten of the Patitruppattu Collection, a text that provides a detailed biography of Cenguttuvan, his royal family (the Chera dynasty), and his reign (and yet does not refer to the king having a brother who became an ascetic or composed an epic). As such, scholars have posited that the biography of Ilango Adigal was likely interpolated into Cilappatikaram at a later date.

Scholar Zvelebil suggested that the Ilango Adigal background and his connection to Cenguttuvan could be a product of "poetic fantasy", possibly introduced by a later member of the Chera dynasty (in the 5th or 6th century CE), reflecting on events from the 2nd or 3rd century CE. Zvelebil, however, expanded on this by stating:

"Those who distrust the colophons to Patirrupattu, as well as who tried to prove that the 3rd book of Cilappatikaram was almost a late forgery, have committed one very basic fallacy they thought that late material was necessarily unauthentic, their utterly false contention was that the content of a work could not be older than its form"

— Kamil Zvelebil, On Tamil Literature of South India (1973)

Notably, the author [Ilango Adigal] appears as a character in the final canto of the poem (lines 155–178), where the phrase "I also went in [...]" is used. Scholars interpret this "I" as referring to Ilango Adigal himself.

According to Zvelebil, the background was likely added by Ilango Adigal to ensure that he remained part of the collective memory within the epic he composed. Zvelebil suggests that Adigal was probably a Jain scholar who lived several centuries later, and that his epic "cannot have been composed before the 5th or 6th century AD".

R. Parthasarathy, another scholar, suggests that Ilango Adigal was likely neither a prince nor connected to the Chera dynasty. Instead, he believes that these references were added to elevate the status of the text, secure royal patronage, and play a key role in the institutionalization of the worship of the goddess Pattini and her temples in the Tamil country (modern Kerala and Tamil Nadu) as described in the poem.

=== Gajabahu Synchronism ===
The epic Cilappatikaram also mentions, among other details, the "Gajabahu Synchronism" (Canto 30, lines 155-164). This reference was famously used by historians such as K. A. Nilakanta Sastri to date the poem and early Tamil history to 2nd/3rd century CE.

Cilappatikaram (Canto 30, lines 155-164) states that the poet Ilango Adigal attended the consecration of the Pattini temple by Chera king Cenguttuvan, at the Chera city of Vanci, in the presence of Gajabahu, the king of Sri Lanka. The Gajabahu mentioned in the text is identified with the historical ruler of Sri Lanka bearing the same name (fl. c. 173-95 CE). This identification has led to the proposal that Ilango Adigal lived during the same period as the historical Gajabahu, in early historic south India.

However, scholars such as Obeyesekere consider the epic's references to Gajabahu and the kinship between Ilango Adigal and Cenkuttuvan to be "ahistorical", suggesting that these portions were likely late interpolations into the poem. However, it is now widely recognized that additional evidence generally supports the Gajabahu chronology.

== See also ==
- Five Great Epics
- Tamil literature
