= Tamil inscriptions =

List of Tamil archaeological artefacts and epigraphs

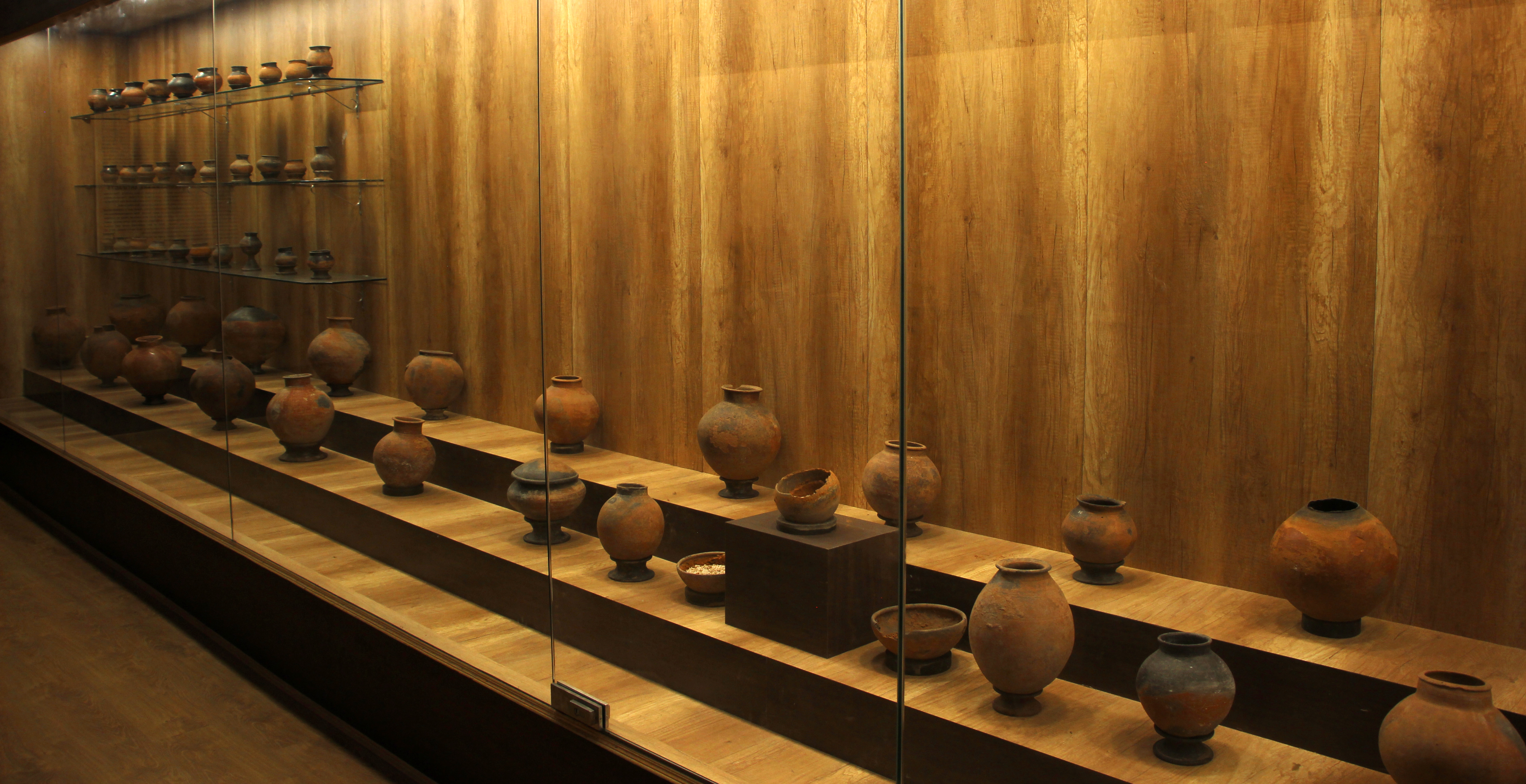
Findings from Adichanallur in the Government Museum, Chennai

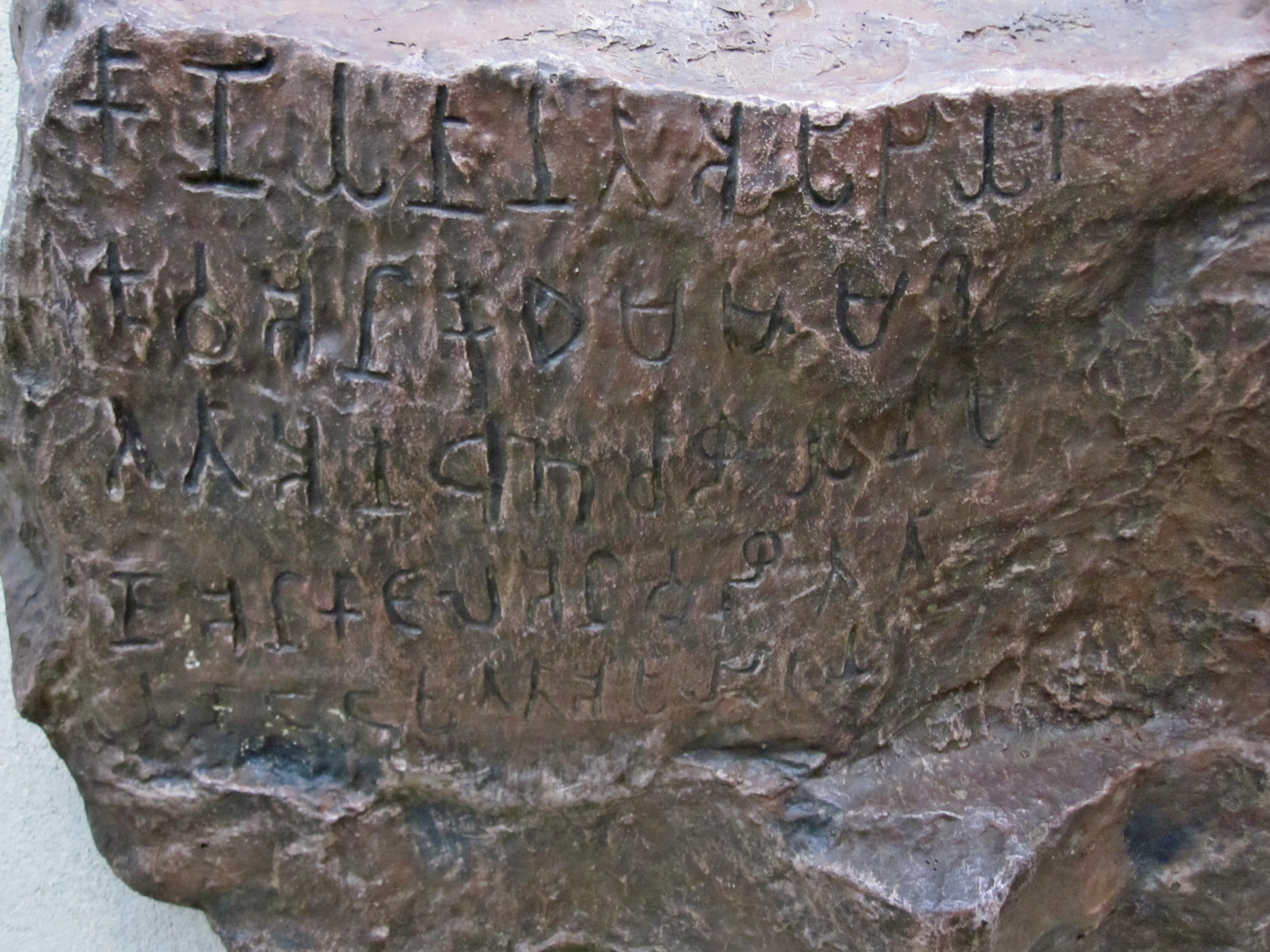
3rd century BCE Tamil inscription of Mangulam

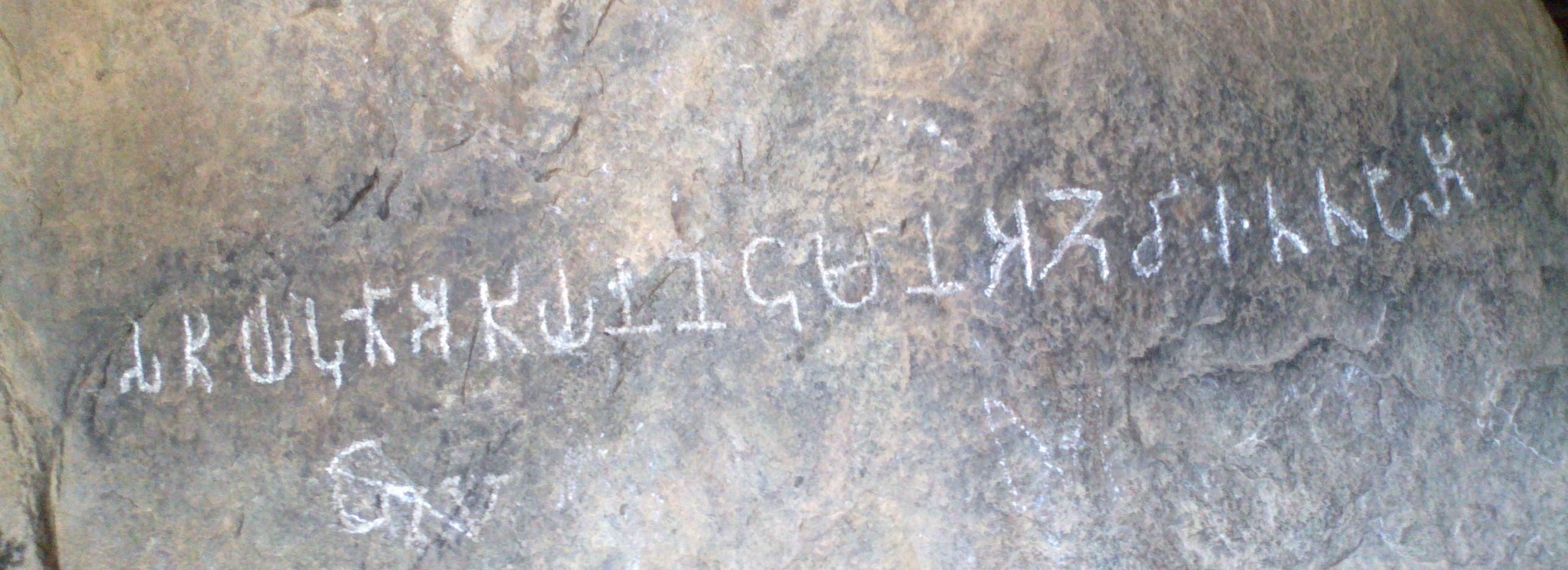
1st century BCE. Tamil inscription found in Jambai village, Tamil Nadu

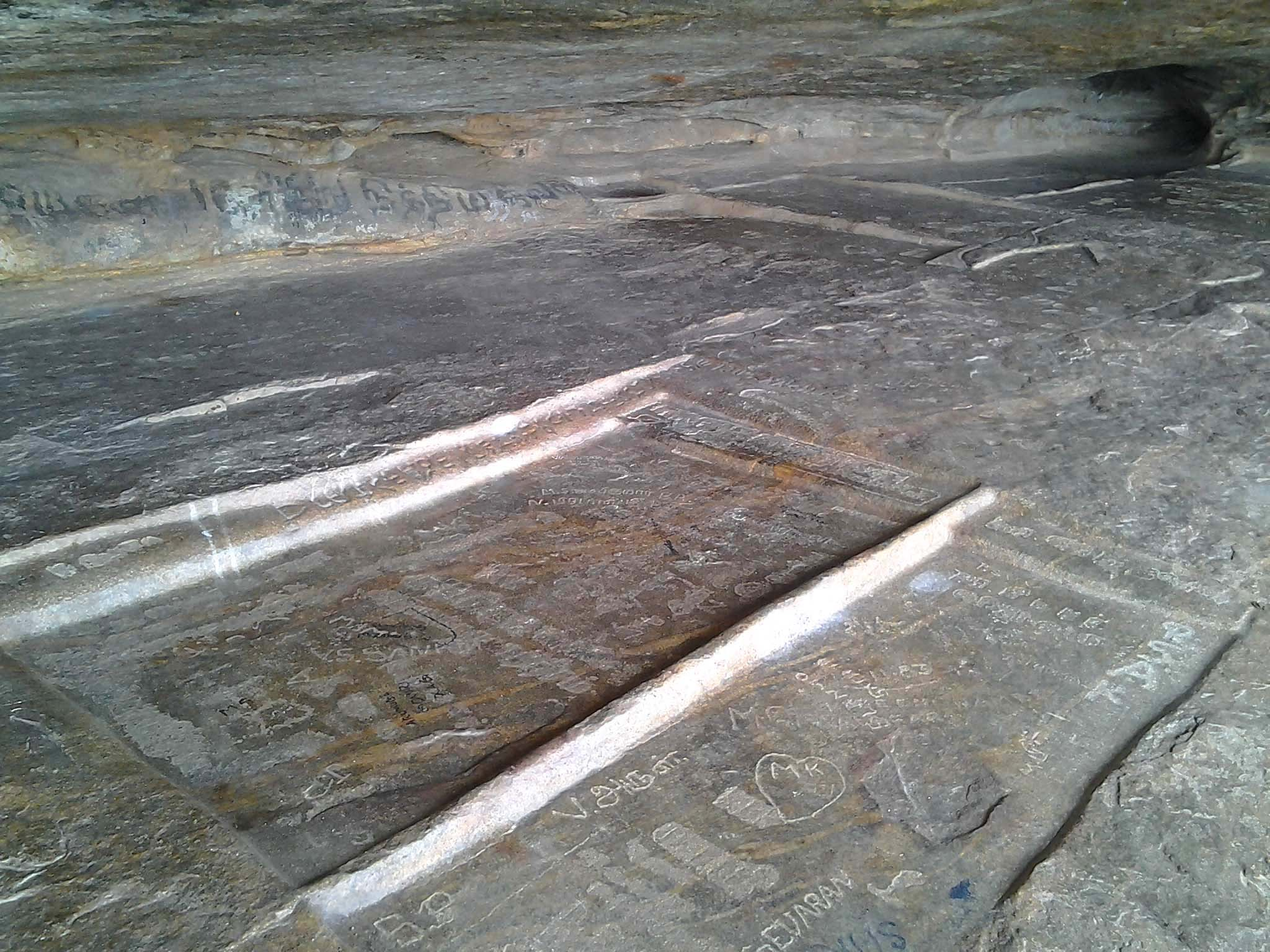
Stone beds with Tamil script inscriptions of Jain saints in Sittanavasal, Pudukkottai District, 1st century BCE

1st Century BCE. Silver Ring From Karur, Tamil Nadu with Personal Name "Peravatan" in Tamil script

This is a list of archaeological artefacts and epigraphs which have Tamil inscriptions. Of the approximately 100,000 inscriptions found by the Archaeological Survey of India (2005 report) in India, about 60,000 were in Tamil Nadu

== Ancient Tamil Epigraphy ==
- Burial of Adichanallur, Tamil Nadu skeletons were found buried in earthenware urns that contained Tamil inscriptions. c. 1000 BCE
- Sivagalai archaeological site, where Iron tools are dated to 3345 BCE has been found with Tamil inscriptions that dated to 685 BCE and with paddy dating to 1,155 BCE.
- Keeladi excavation site in Tamil Nadu found with Tamil inscriptions in various structures and artifacts, on pottery with Tamil names such as Aathan, Uthiran, Kuviran-Aathan and Thisan. The site contains Tamil script artifacts dating to 580BCE.
- Anaikoddai seal (steatite seal), Tamil inscriptions mixed in with Megalithic Graffiti Symbols found in Anaikoddai, Sri Lanka, c. 1000 BCE – c. 300 BCE
- Potsherds found in Kodumanal and Porunthal
- Tamil script dating to 500 BCE found at Porunthal site is located 12 km South West of Palani, Tamil Nadu
- Tamil script dating to 500 BCE found at Kodumanal, Chennimalai near Erode, Tamil Nadu
- Punch-marked coins of 5th century BCE found at Karur, on the bank of river Amaravathi, is located at 78 km from Tiruchirappalli, Tamil Nadu
- Ancient Pottery dating back to the 4th century BCE have been discovered off shore by marine archaeologists east of Poompuhar, also known as Kaveripattinam is a town in the Mayuladuthurai district of Tamil Nadu. Kaveripattnam was a thriving ancient capital port city of the Early Chola Empire.
- Tamil-Brāhmī sherds found in Khor Rori, Oman, an archelogical site; dated from 1st century BCE to 4th century BCE.

=== 3rd century BCE ===
- Tamil inscriptions in caves, Mangulam, Madurai district, Tamil Nadu, 3rd century BCE. There are five caves in the hill of which six inscriptions are found in four caves. The inscriptions mentions that workers of Nedunchezhiyan I, a Pandyan king of Sangam period, (c. 270 BCE) made stone beds for Jain monks. It further details the name of worker for whom he made stone bed. For example, an inscription shows that Kadalan Vazhuthi, a worker of Nedunchezhiyan made stone bed to Jain monk Nanda Sirikuvan. It is one of the protected monuments in Tamil Nadu by the Archaeological Survey of India.
- Artifact related to Early Pandyan Kingdom's King Nedunjeliyan I (c. 270 BCE) found in Kovalanpottal, Madurai district, Tamil Nadu
- Potsherds with Tamil script found in Korkai, Thoothukudi district, Tamil Nadu, 3rd century BCE
- Tamil script dating back to the 3rd century BCE near Thenur, Madurai, Tamil Nadu. Script is written on gold bars.
- Potsherds with Tamil Brahmi inscriptions found in Poonagari, Jaffna, 2nd century BCE.
- Black and red ware potsherd in Ucchapanai, Kandarodai, Jaffna, 300 BCE
- Locally produced coins with Tamil Brahmi legends were found in the southern town of Tissamaharama.
- A pot rim at Pattanam, central Kerala.
- Edakal cave, Ambukuthi hill, Kerala.
- Tirupparankundram hill, Madurai
- Fifth ‘hero’ stone found with Tamil Brahmi inscriptions at Porpanakkottai
- Thenur, Madurai. Script is written on a gold bar, 300 BCE.
- A laterite in Karadukka in Kasaragod district, Kerala.

=== 2nd century BCE ===
- Black and red ware piece containing Tamil-Brahmi inscription found in Mangudi, Tirunelveli District, Tamil Nadu, 2nd century BCE. The inscription has been deciphered as "Kurummangala Athan yi Yanai Po"
- Potsherds with Tamil-Brahmi inscriptions found in Poonagari, Jaffna, Sri Lanka, 2nd century BCE

=== 1st century BCE ===
- Tamil script Rock-cavern inscription in Jambai village, Tiruvannamalai District, Tamil Nadu, 1st century BCE. It reads "Satiyaputo Atiyan Nedumaan Anjji itta Paali", In (Tamil: ஸதியபுதோ அதியந் நெடுமாந் அஞ்சி ஈத்த பாழி). The meaning of the epigraph may be rendered as "The abode (pali) given by (itta) Atiyan Nedumaan Anji (name), the Satyaputra (title)". Though the record is a short one in a single line, it throws valuable light on various aspects of South Indian history. The inscription clears the doubt about the identity of the Satyaputras, a dynasty of rulers, mentioned in Ashoka's inscriptions in the 3rd century BCE
- A broken storage jar with inscriptions in Tamil script in Quseir-al-Qadim, (Leukos Limen), Egypt, 1st century BCE. Two earlier Tamil-Brahmi inscription discoveries at the same site, 1st century BCE. The inscribed text is 𑀧𑀸𑀦𑁃 𑀑𑀶𑀺 paanai oRi "pot suspended in a rope net" (which would be பானை ஒறி in the modern Tamil script) as "Muu-na-ka-ra" and "Muu-ca-ka-ti"
- Tamil script Rock Bed Inscription for Jain Monks in Sittanavasal, Pudukkottai District, Tamil Nadu, 1st century BCE, It reads as "Eruminatu kumul-ur piranta kavuti-i tenku-cirupocil ilayar ceyta atit-anam"
- Silver Ring From Karur, Tamil Nadu with Personal Name "Peravatan (பெரவாதன்)" in Tamil script, 1st Century BCE
- Megalithic pottery with graffiti symbols that have a strong resemblance to a sign in the Indus script have been found in Sembiyankandiyur and Melaperumpallam villages, Mayiladuthurai district, Tamil Nadu, 1st Century BCE
- Hundreds of potsherds of the Mediterranean region which include rouletted ware, amphorae jar pieces and pieces of red ware with Tamil script have been found in Alagankulam, Ramanathapuram District, Tamil Nadu, 1st century BCE
- An inscribed amphora fragment in Tamil Brahmi at Berenice Troglodytica, Red Sea, Egypt, dated between 1st century BCE and 1st century CE.
- The Tamil Brahmi and the northern (Ashokan) Brahmi inscriptions found in Siamo-Malay peninsula and Vietnam are the earliest known evidence of writing in southeast Asia.

== First millennium AD ==
- Tamil-Brahmi script dating to 50 CE found at Oman country. Experts explains that the script "nantai kiran" has two components: an honorific suffix for elderly names and a personal name, with over 20 Tamil Sangam age poets including "kiran" in their names.
- Fragments with inscriptions in Tamil Brahmi script have been found – along with other records in Indic languages and scripts – in Quseir-al-Qadim, (Leukos Limen) Egypt, all dated to about the 1st or 2nd century CE. These evidence a trade relationship between Indian traders and Egyptian counterparts. Two earlier Tamil Brahmi inscription discoveries at the same site, 1st century CE. The inscribed text is 𑀧𑀸𑀦𑁃 𑀑𑀶𑀺 paanai oRi "pot suspended in a rope net".
- Tamil-Brahmi inscriptions in the Tamil language, along with Sanskrit in northern Brahmi script, have been found in archaeological sites of southeast Asian countries such as Thailand, Vietnam, Cambodia and Indonesia. For example, a Goldsmith's touchstone found in Wat Klong Thom (Krabi, Thailand) is among the earliest known Tamil inscription in Tamil Brahmi. It is from the 3rd century CE. This evidence along with other inscriptions found in this region suggests that Tamil goldsmiths were likely settled and working in this region of the southeast Asia in the early centuries of the common era.
- Pottery and other items with Tamil Brahmi inscriptions have been discovered in the Philippines, for example Baybayin, and in Phu Khao Thong, Thailand and Khuan Luk Pat. They are dated to about the 2nd century CE-14th century CE. They are damaged and incomplete but likely refer to some monk (Tamil: turavon). These suggest a trading, religious and cultural exchange between the Tamil region and southeast Asia. The Tamil Brahmi inscriptions and items unearthed since the 1980s in this region suggest that the cultural and economic exchange included mixed themes with shades of Buddhism and Hinduism.
- 'Sanskritized' inscriptions in medieval Tamil script are carved on the walls of the garbhagriha and the prakaram of Sree Chakrapani Temple, Thrikaripur in Kerala. Although the exact age of the inscriptions is not known, inscriptions here state that the temple was rebuilt in the Malayalam year 410 (1235 CE), Makaram 27.

== See also ==
- Early Indian epigraphy – History of South Asian writing systems
- Tamil-Brahmi
- Tamil script
- Tamil inscriptions in the Malay world
- Tamil bell In New Zealand
- Thiruvilandur Copper Plate
- Tamil copper-plate inscriptions
- Indian copper plate inscriptions
- Laguna Copperplate Inscription
- Tamil Brahmi inscription of Tissamaharama
- Pallava script
- History of Tamil Nadu
- Chronology of Tamil history
- Tamil Heritage Foundation
- Early Indian epigraphy
- Tamil inscriptions in Sri Lanka
- Tamil inscriptions of Bengaluru

== Sources ==
- Lakshimikanth, L (2008), Current affairs reckoner, Tata McGraw Hill, ISBN 978-0070221666
