= Daṇḍaka =

Ancient people in the Deccan

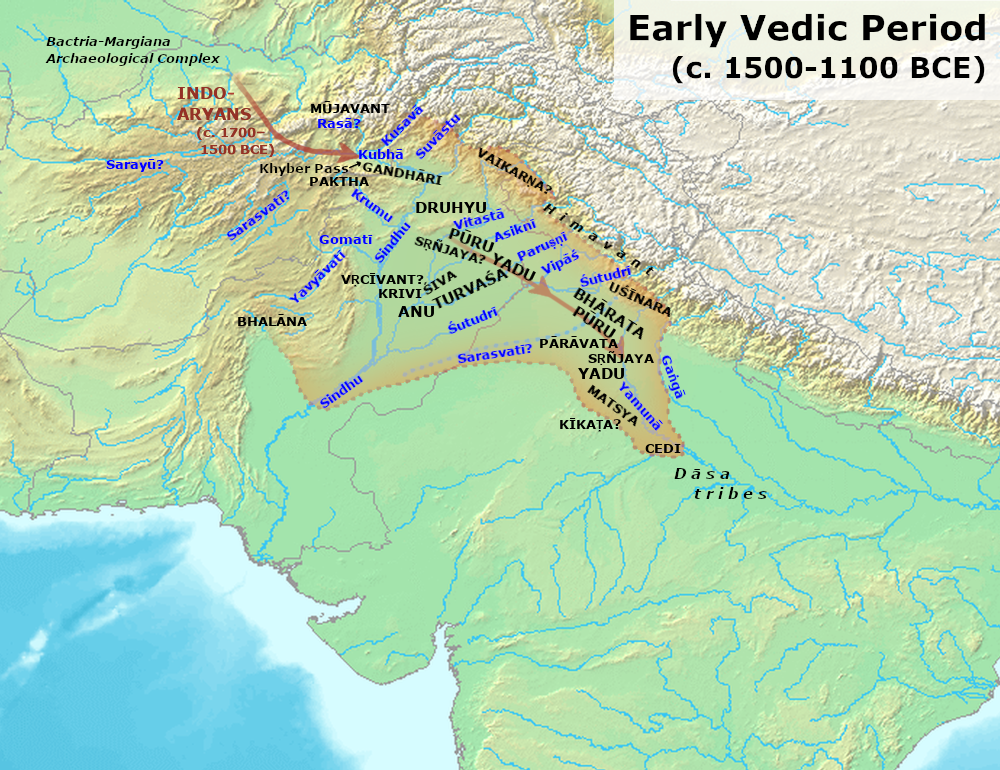
Location of the Yadu tribe from which the Daṇḍakas were descended among the Vedic tribes

Location of the Daṇḍakas during the post-Vedic period

Daṇḍaka (Sanskrit: Daṇḍaka) was an ancient Indo-Aryan tribe of south-central South Asia whose existence is attested during the Iron Age.

== Location ==
The capital of Daṇḍaka was named Kumbhavatī, or Madhumanta, or Govardhana, and corresponds to the modern-day Nāśik.

== History ==
The Daṇḍakas and their ruling clan, the Bhojas, were descended from the Ṛgvedic Yadu tribe.

According to the Arthaśāstra of Kauṭilya, a king of Daṇḍaka died along with his relatives and his kingdom after attempting to rape a brāhmaṇa girl.
