= Megalithic graffiti symbols =

Ancient markings in the Indian subcontinent

Megalithic markings, Megalithic graffiti marks, Megalithic symbols or Non-Brahmi symbols are terms used to describe markings found on mostly potsherds found in Central India, South India and Sri Lanka during the Megalithic Iron Age period. They are usually found in burial sites but some have been found in habitation sites. They are tentatively dated from 1000 BCE to 300 CE marking the transition of the proto-historic period into the historic period of the Indian subcontinent. A number of scholars have tried to decipher the symbols since 1878, and currently there is no consensus as to whether they constitute un-deciphered writing or graffiti or symbols without any syllabic or alphabetic meaning.

In 1960, archaeologist B. B. Lal found that 89% of the surveyed megalithic symbols had their counterparts amongst the Indus script. He concluded that there was a commonness of culture between the Indus Valley Civilisation and the later megalithic period. In 2019, archaeologists in Tamil Nadu excavated further potsherds at Keeladi with graffiti closely resembling symbols of the Indus script.

From archaeological stratigraphy, potsherds with and without symbols are usually found at the lowest level, followed by potsherds with mixed symbols and Brahmi or Tamil Brahmi and eventually at the highest level potsherds are only found with Brahmi or Tamil Brahmi etchings. From around 300 CE, they disappear from grave sites. Scholars such as Iravatham Mahadevan have tried to link the symbols directly to Indus Valley script or as derived due to lingering influence, whereas others such as K. Rajan see the symbols as the genesis of the later Brahmi script. Yet many others see no particular alphabetic value in them only as graffiti symbols used for socio-religious purposes.

== See also ==
- Pottery in the Indian subcontinent
