= Netunceliyan I =

Pandya ruler from Tamilakam

Netunceliyan
- Āriyappaṭai-kaṭanta Neṭuñceḻiyaṉ (lit., he who won a victory against an Aryan army)
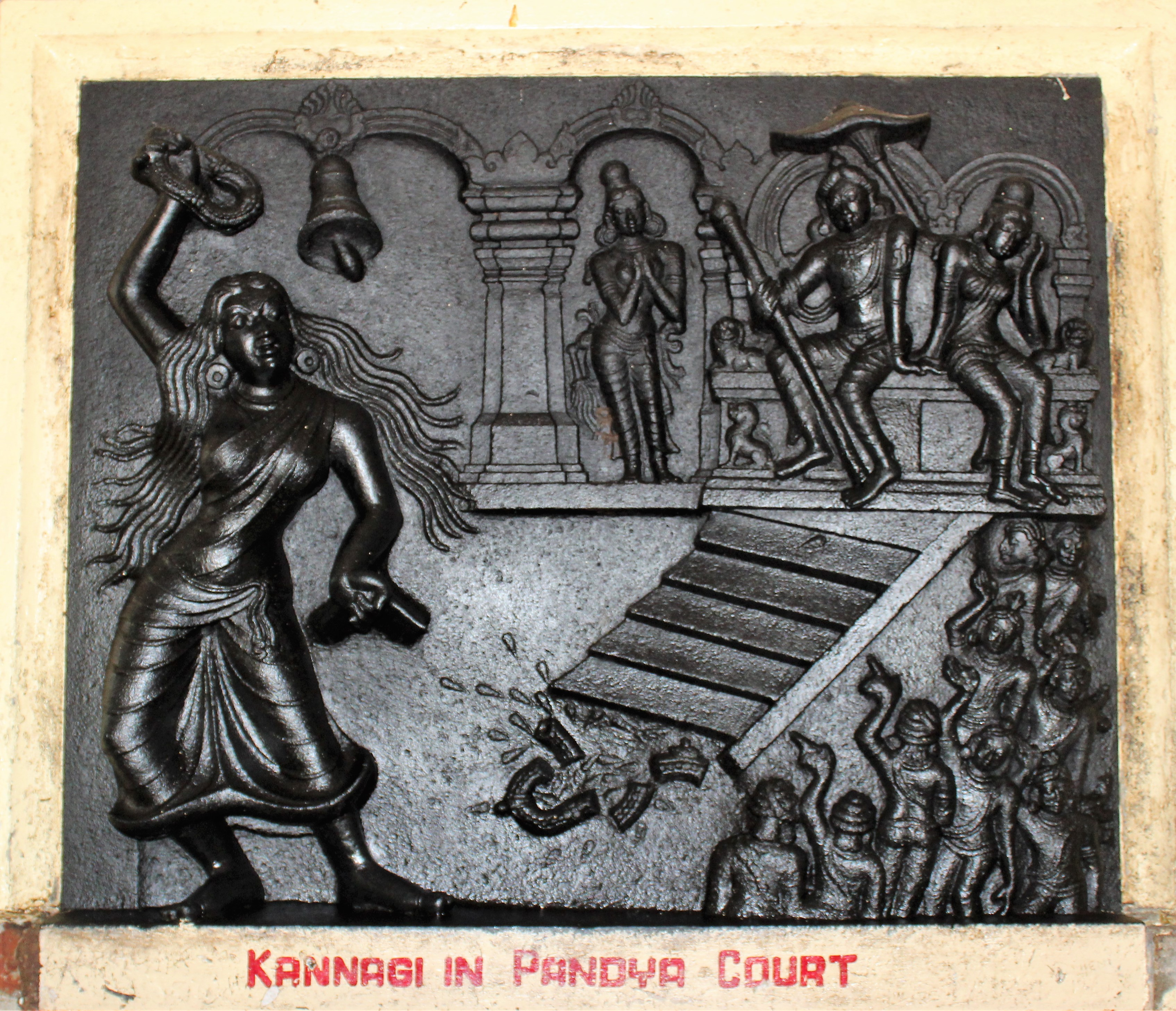
- Kannagi asking for justice in the court of Netunceliyan, a scene from the Cilappatikaram

Pandyan Ruler
- Reign: 270 BCE
- Successor: Vetrivēl Seliyan
- Spouse: Kopperundevi
- Issue: Vetrivēl Seliyan
- House: Pandyan
- Religion: Jainism

Netunceliyan, was an early Pandya king. Netunceliyan was known by the title Āriyappaṭai-kaṭanta Neṭuñceḻiyaṉ (he who won a victory against an Aryan army). He is a character in Ilango Adigal's Cilappatikaram, one of the Five Great Epics in Tamil literature.

== Literature ==
The Cilappatikāram's Katturaikadai canto mentions Neduncheziyan's victory over Aryans:

[...] These and many other things, illustrative of the unmatched rule of righteousness of the Pandyan Neduncheziyan, who vanquished the army of the northern Aryas, and established peace in the southern Tamil country [...]

— Cilappatikāram, Book II: Maduraikkāndam, Canto XXIII: Katturaikādai

Netunceliyan thus appears in Cilappatikaram, which describes the tragic story of Kannagi and Kovalan. It is attributed to Ilango Adigal, a Chera prince turned monk, and was probably composed between the 2nd and the 6th centuries CE.

The first part of Cilappatikāram describes the city of Puhar in the Chola Empire, where the pair of Kovalan and Kannagi reside. After Kovalan loses his wealth through his illicit relationship with the dancer Madhavi, he returns to Kannagi and the couple decide to move to Madurai in the Pandya Empire. The Pandyas are led by king Neduncheziyan and his wife Kopperundevi.

When Kovalan attempts to sell one of the two anklets of Kannagi to raise money, the royal goldsmith, who had earlier stolen an anklet belonging to the queen Kopperundevi, finds the that anklets are similar, and falsely accuses Kovalan of stealing the queen’s anklet. Enraged by the act, the king Neduncheziyan orders Kovalan’s arrest and execution without a fair trial. After Kovalan is executed, Kannagi appears in the royal court, trying to prove her husband’s innocence and demanding justice. She breaks open her remaining anklet to reveal that her anklet contained rubies whereas queen Kopperundevi's missing anklet contained pearls. When the king realises the truth and his mistake, he kills himself due to remorse.

The Silappatikaram describes Yavana soldiers employed by the Pandya kingdom and stationed at the fortified entrance of Madurai. In the episode concerning Kovalan's entry into Madurai, the fort gate is described as being guarded by Yavana soldiers. The Government Museum, Chennai, identifies these Yavanas as Roman soldiers and notes their service in the Pandya palace and fort. The Mullaippāṭṭu also describes Yavana soldiers serving in the army and guarding the king's military camp. These accounts are associated with the period of the Pandya king Neduncheliyan.

S. Arunadevi, in History of Sangam Tamils: A Study, notes that Roman soldiers were enlisted in the armies of certain Pandya rulers and discusses the description of Yavanas in Mullaippāṭṭu, including their distinctive appearance and customs.

== Archaeological evidence ==
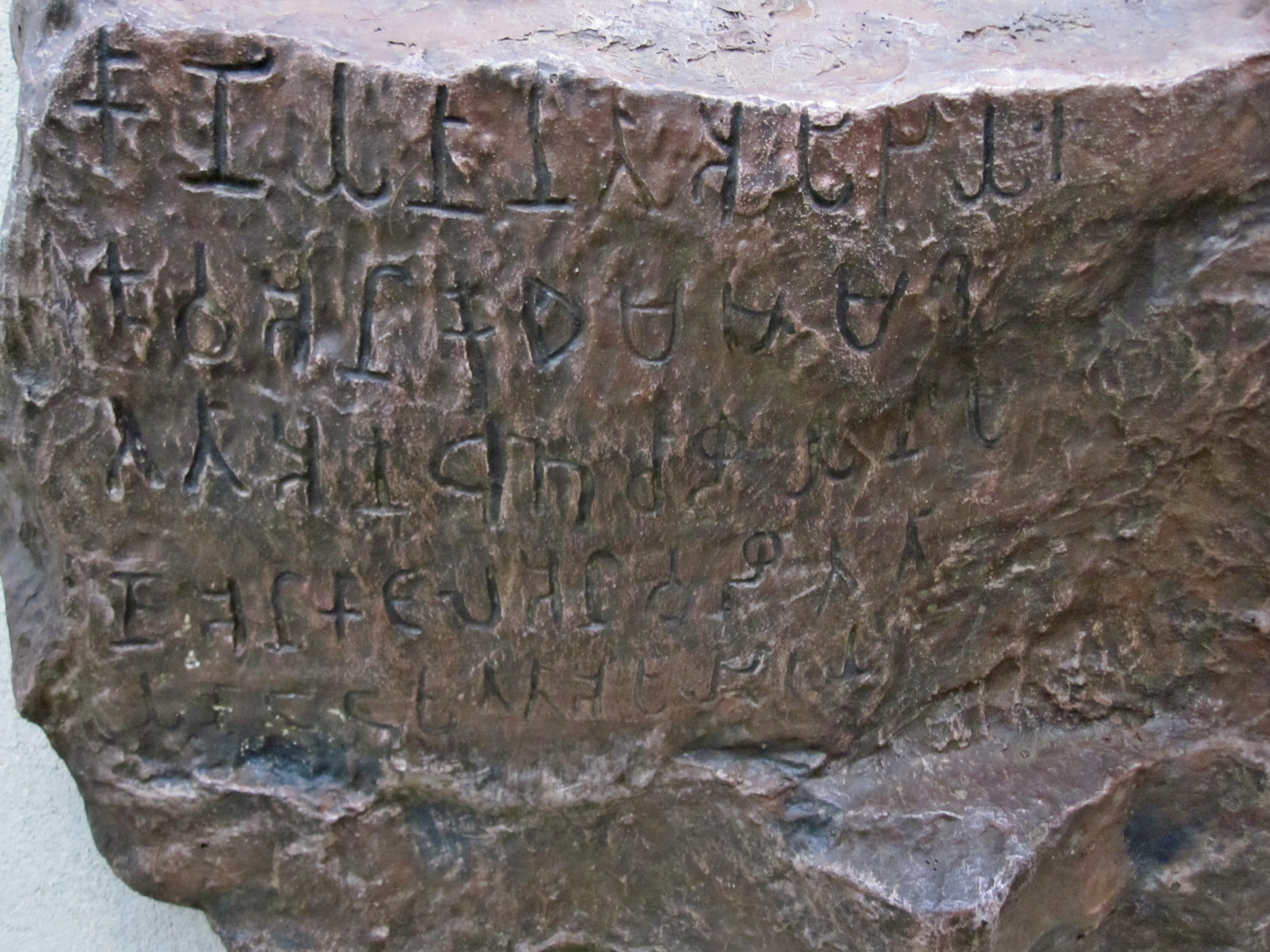
Tamil-Brahmi inscription from Mangulam, dated to the era of Netunceliyan

According to Iravatham Mahadevan, the Tamil Brahmi inscriptions discovered at Mangulam, possibly mentions the Pandyan king Netunceliyan. He is titled as Āriyappaṭai-kaṭanta Neṭuñceḻiyaṉ (Netunceliyan who defeated the Aryans), signifiying his defeat of the Aryans.

The inscriptions mentions that workers of Neṭuñceḻiyaṉ I, a Pandyan king of Sangam period, (c. 270 BCE) made stone beds for Jain monks. It further details the name of worker for whom he made stone bed. For example, an inscription shows that Kaṭalaṉ Vaḻuti, a worker (பணஅன்- accountant; he was also related family) of Neṭuñceḻiyaṉ, made a stone bed for the Jain monk Nanta-siri Kuvaṉ.

== In popular culture ==
Year	Title	Language	Actor
1942	Kannagi	Tamil	Unidentified
1964	Poompuhar	Tamil	O. A. K. Thevar
1968	Kodungallooramma	Malayalam	Kottarakkara Sreedharan Nair
2016	Paththini	Sinhala	Ravindra Randeniya

== See also ==
- List of Sangam poets
