= H. Krishna Sastri =

Indian epigraphist

Rao Bahadur Hosakote Krishna Sastri
- Born: 16 September 1870; Hosakote, Mysore Kingdom
- Died: 8 February 1928 (aged 57); Bangalore, Mysore Kingdom
- Occupation: archaeologist

Rao Bahadur Hosakote Krishna Sastri (16 September 1870 – 8 February 1928) was an Indian epigraphist with the Archaeological Survey of India (ASI). He is known for his work in deciphering Brahmi inscriptions of Asoka at Maski and inscriptions of the Pallavas. Sastri edited volumes XVII, XVIII and XIX of Epigraphia Indica and authored a book titled "South Indian images of Gods and Goddesses".

Krishna Sastri was also known for his pioneering work in deciphering Tamil-Brahmi inscriptions. In a 1919 paper co-authored with K. V. Subrahmanya Aiyar, Sastri identified Tamil words in the Brahmi inscription at Mangulam.
