= Mangulam =

Neighbourhood in Madurai district, Tamil Nadu, India

Coordinates: 10.033227°N 78.243114°E

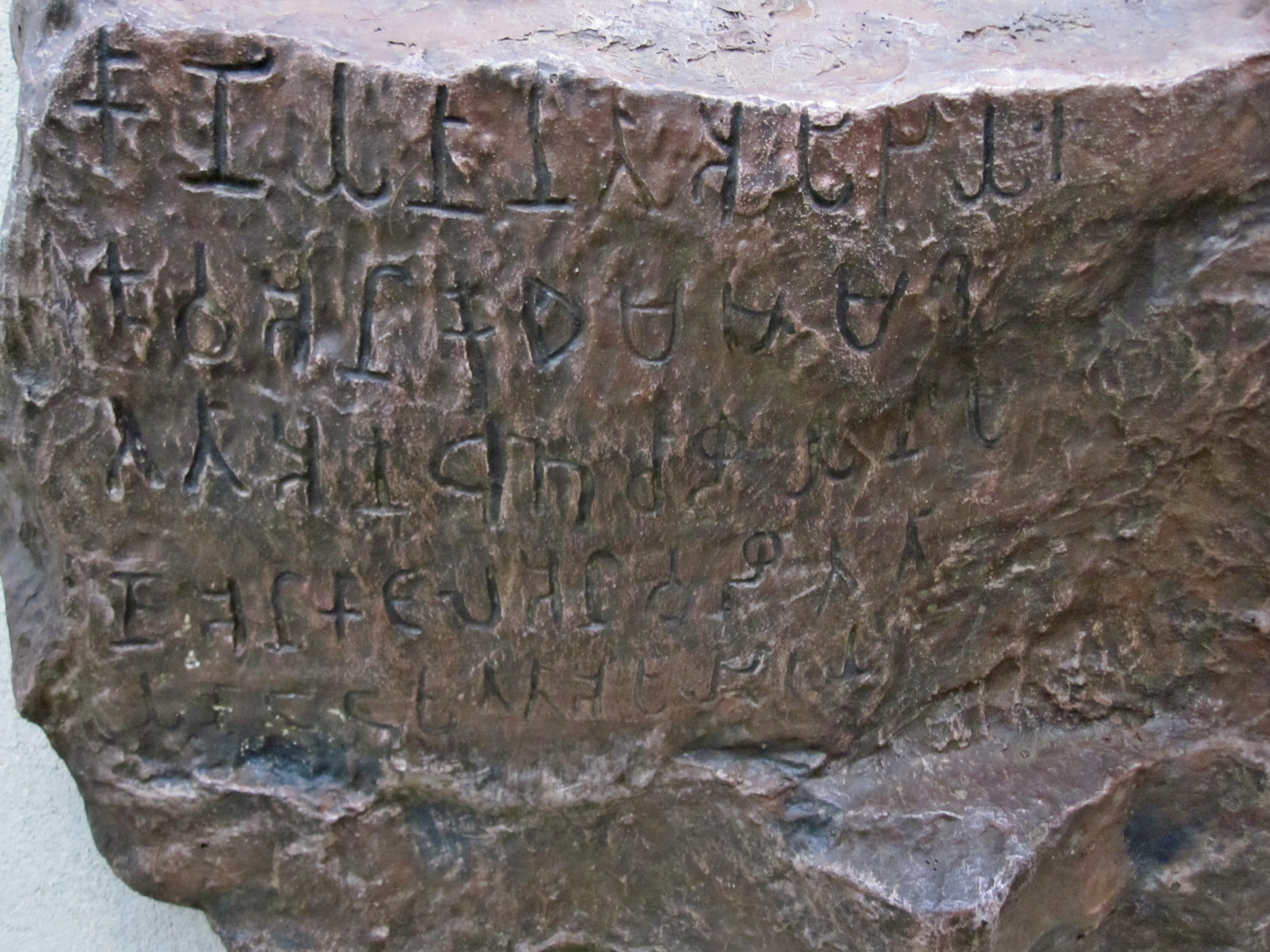
Mangulam Jain inscriptions (model)

Mangulam or Mankulam is a village in Madurai district, Tamil Nadu, India. It is located 25 kilometres (16 mi) from Madurai. The inscriptions discovered in the region are the earliest Tamil-Brahmi inscriptions.

== History ==
A hill southeast of the village known as Mangulam hill or Kalugumalai (eagle hill) or Ovamalai, is where Tamil Jain monks lived in the caves during when their religion flourished in the ancient Tamil country. They converted the caves into their Palli (monastery) and lived here from 3 BCE to the 9th century CE.

=== Mangulam inscriptions ===
Mangulam inscriptions were discovered by Robert Sewell in the caves of the hill in 1882. This was the earliest finding of such kind of inscriptions. In 1906, Indian epigraphist V. Venkayya tried to read the inscriptions and found that it similar to the Brahmi script in Ashokan edicts, he thought that the inscriptions were in Pali language. In 1919, epigraphist H. Krishna Sastri identified few Tamil words in the inscriptions. In 1924, K. V. Subrahmanya Aiyar discovered that inscriptions are in Tamil with some Prakrit loan words in the Brahmi script and concluded that script is Tamil-Brahmi. In 1965, Iravatham Mahadevan recorded the inscriptions in the caves and dated it to the late 3rd century BCE.

There are five caves in the hill of which six inscriptions are found in four caves. These were inscribed during Sangam period, hence it is considered one of the important inscriptions in Tamil Nadu. Archeologists found sherds, sling stones and an ancient burial site during the excavation in the region. In 2007, Tamil Nadu Archaeology Department excavated the ruins of the Jain prayer halls of Sangam period. The inscriptions are among the protected monuments in Tamil Nadu by the Archaeological Survey of India.

==== Content ====
The inscriptions mentions that workers of Neṭuñceḻiyaṉ I, a Pandyan king of Sangam period, (c. 270 BCE) made stone beds for Jain monks. It further details the name of worker for whom he made stone bed. For example, an inscription shows that Kaṭalaṉ Vaḻuti, a worker (பணஅன்- accountant; he was also related family) of Neṭuñceḻiyaṉ, made a stone bed for the Jain monk Nanta-siri Kuvaṉ.

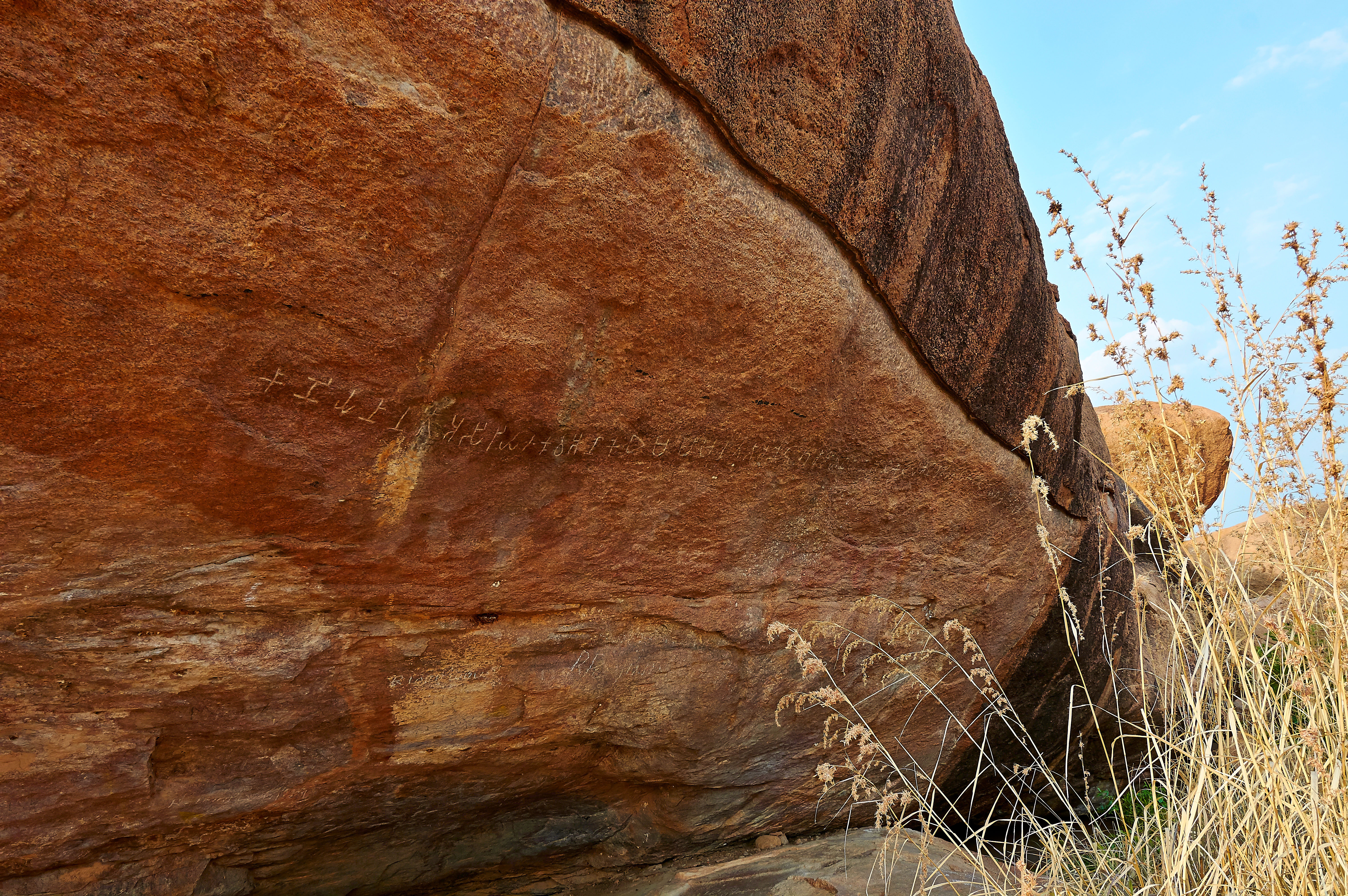
The longest inscription at the site, and the earliest known Tamil-Brāhmī inscription. It records the gift by the Pandya king Neṭuñceḻiyaṉ of a monastery to the senior Jain monk Nanta-siri Kuvaṉ.

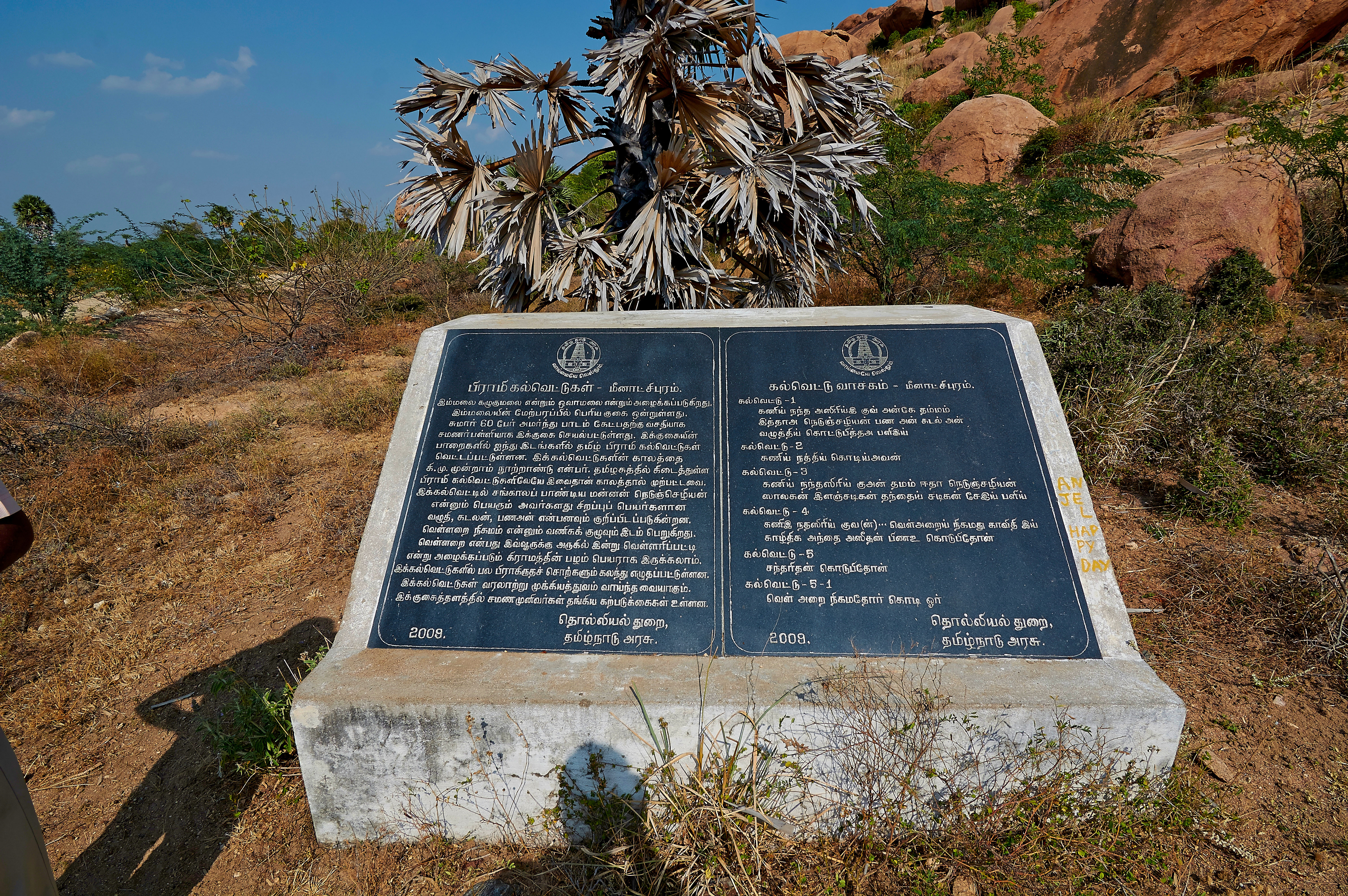
Information board by Department of Archaeology, on the left is description about the Mangulam Tamil Brahmi inscriptions and actual translation is on the right.

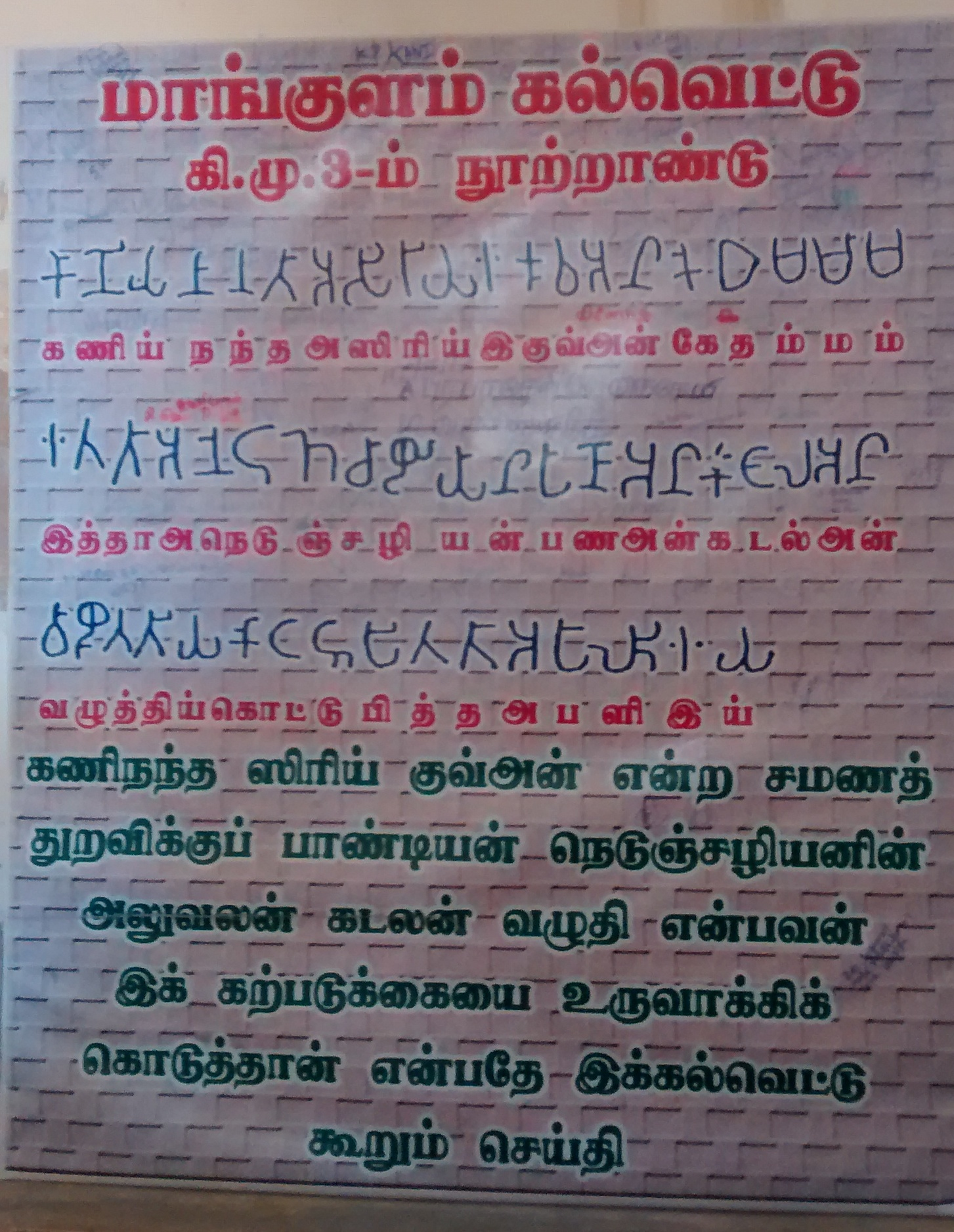
Mangulam inscriptions explained.

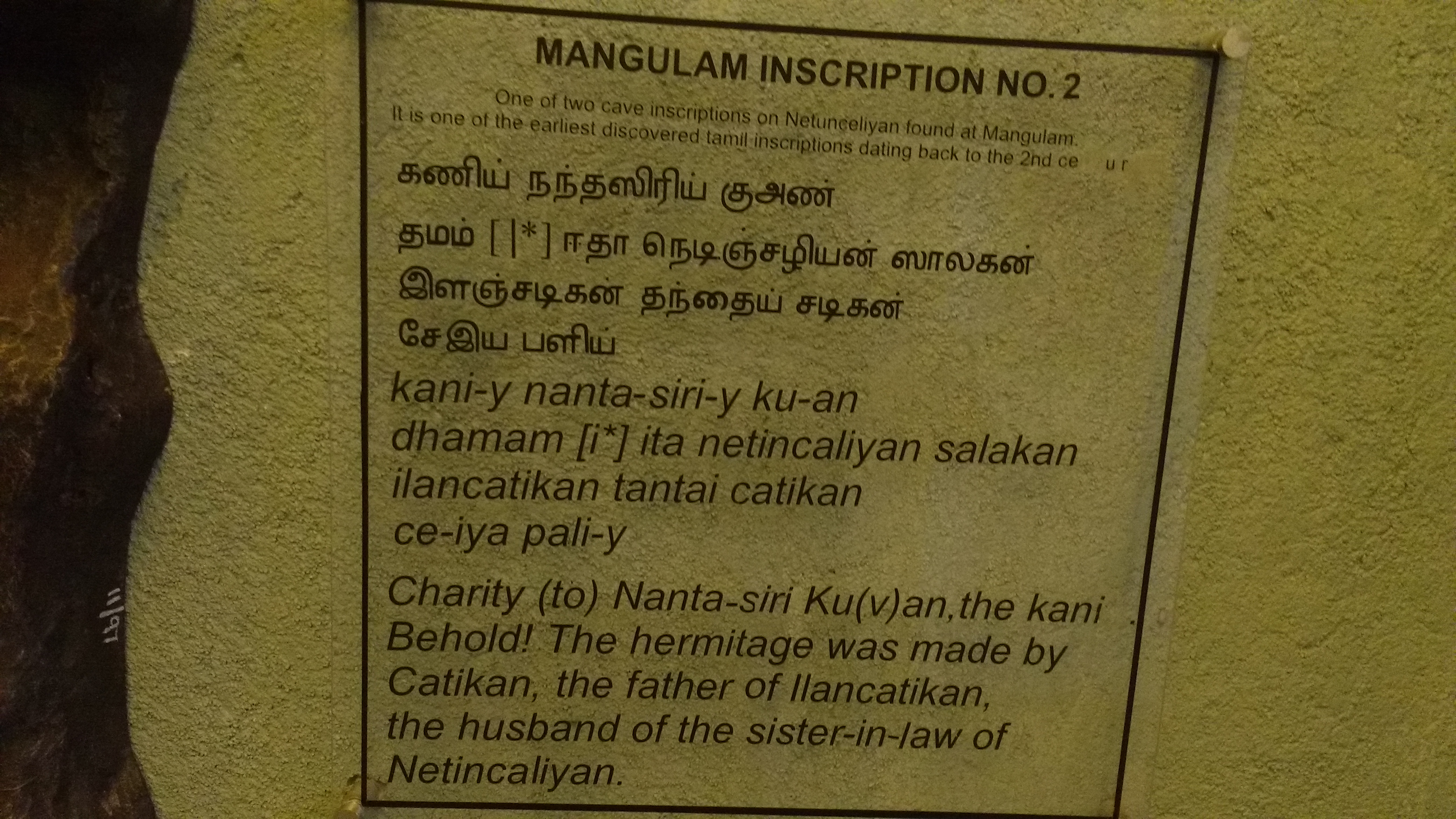
Mangulam inscription no.2 explained.
