= Iron Age in India =

Aspect of Indian history

In the prehistory of the Indian subcontinent, the Iron Age succeeded Bronze Age India and partly corresponds with the megalithic cultures of South India. Other Iron Age archaeological cultures of north India were the Painted Grey Ware culture (1300–300 BCE) and the Northern Black Polished Ware (700–200 BCE). This corresponds to the transition of the Janapadas or principalities of the Vedic period to the sixteen Mahajanapadas or region-states of the early historic period, culminating in the emergence of the Maurya Empire towards the end of the period.

The earliest evidence of iron smelting predates the emergence of the Iron Age proper by several centuries. Claims for iron smelting in Tamil Nadu as early as the mid-4th millennium BCE have been made on the basis of radiocarbon dates from charcoal samples at the site of Sivagalai, dated between c. 3345 and 2953 BCE. These dates are disputed.

== Region ==
=== Northern India ===
R. Tewari (2003) radiocarbon dated iron artefacts in Uttar Pradesh, including furnaces, tuyeres, and slag between c. 1800 BCE to 1000 BCE. Antiquity of iron in India was pushed back from following the excavations at Malhar, Raja Nala ka Tila, Dadupur and Lauhradewa in Uttar Pradesh from 1996 to 2001.

The use of iron and iron working was prevalent in the Central Ganga Plain and the Eastern Vindhyas from the early second millennium BCE.

The beginning of the use of iron has been traditionally associated with the eastward migration of the later Vedic people, who are also considered as an agency which revolutionised material culture particularly in the Greater Magadhan region.

Scholar Rakesh Tewari states that new finds and their dates suggest the need for a fresh review. According to him, the evidence corroborates the early use of iron in other areas of the country, and attests that India was indeed an independent centre for the development of the working of iron.

However, reviewing the claims of earliest uses of iron during c. 1800-1000 BCE, archaeologist Suraj Bhan noted, "the stratigraphical context and chronology of iron is not beyond doubt" at these sites (namely Malhar, Dadupur, and Lahuradeva) although "there is no doubt" that iron was being used in the Ganges Plains "a few centuries before the rise of urbanization [...] around 600 BCE".

=== Southern India ===
Claims for iron smelting in Tamil Nadu as early as the mid-4th millennium BCE have been made on the basis of radiocarbon dates from charcoal samples at the site of Sivagalai, dated between c. 3345 and 2953 BCE. These dates are disputed, as rice samples from an intact burial urn containing iron artefacts at the same site yielded significantly later dates of c. 1248 and 1155 BCE. Scholars have questioned the early dates due to stratigraphic disturbance, mixing of materials from different periods, and the selective emphasis on the earliest charcoal samples, noting that such a wide chronological range is archaeologically implausible.

Recent excavations at Mayiladumparai in southern India have also been interpreted as indicating early iron use, with some radiocarbon dates suggesting an Iron Age beginning around c. 2172 BCE. These interpretations remain under discussion.

More securely dated Early Iron Age sites in South India include Hallur in Karnataka and Adichanallur in Tamil Nadu, Ramapuram in Andhra Pradesh. which are generally dated to around c. 1000 BCE. The earliest reliably dated iron furnace in Tamil Nadu was discovered at Kodumanal and dates to the 5th century BCE. Mahurjhari, near Nagpur, was a major centre of bead manufacturing during the early historic period.

In a broader context, limited use of iron is attested in the Middle East from c. 3000 BCE, but iron metallurgy became widespread only after c. 1200 BCE, when iron increasingly replaced bronze in tools and weapons, marking the conventional beginning of the Iron Age.

=== Pakistan ===
Charsadda saw the use of iron dating back to circa 900 BCE.

=== Sri Lanka ===
The protohistoric Early Iron Age in Sri Lanka lasted from 1000 BC to 600 BC. Radiocarbon evidence has been collected from Anuradhapura and Aligala shelter in Sigiriya. The Anuradhapura settlement is recorded to extend 10 ha (25 acres) by 800 BC and grew to 50 ha (120 acres) by 700–600 BC to become a town. The skeletal remains of an Early Iron Age chief were excavated in Anaikoddai, Jaffna. The name "Ko Veta" is engraved in Tamil-Brahmi inscriptions on a seal buried with the skeleton and is assigned by the excavators to the 3rd century BC. Ko, meaning "King" in Tamil, is comparable to such names as Ko Atan and Ko Putivira occurring in contemporary Tamil-Brahmi inscriptions in south India. It is also speculated that Early Iron Age sites may exist in Kandarodai, Matota, Pilapitiya and Tissamaharama.

== See also ==
- Archaeology of India
- History of metallurgy in the Indian subcontinent
- Pottery in the Indian subcontinent

Others

- History of India
- Indus Valley Civilisation
- Mahajanapadas
- Stone Age
- Vedic period
