= Tolkappiyar award =

The Tolkappiyar award (Tamil: தொல்காப்பியர் விருது) is a Presidential Award for scholars in classical Tamil. The Tolkappiar awards were awarded from 2005 to 2006 in India. This award was instituted by the Central Institute of Classical Tamil functioning under the aegis of Ministry of Human Resource Development, for teaching, research and publication in classical Tamil. The award was named in honor of the ancient Tamil author, who is known for Tolkāppiyam. It carries a cash prize of Rs 5 lakh, a citation and a shawl.

== Recipients ==
- Prof. Adigalasiriyar 2005–2006
- Dr. Iravatham Mahadevan 2009–2010
- Prof. Tamizhannal Periakaruppan 2010–2011
- Prof. S. N. Kandasamy 2012-2013
- Prof. Dakshinamurthy Ayyaswami 2014-2015
- Dr. R Kalaikkovan 2015–2016
