= Sree Chakrapani Temple, Thrikaripur =

Sree Chakrapani Temple
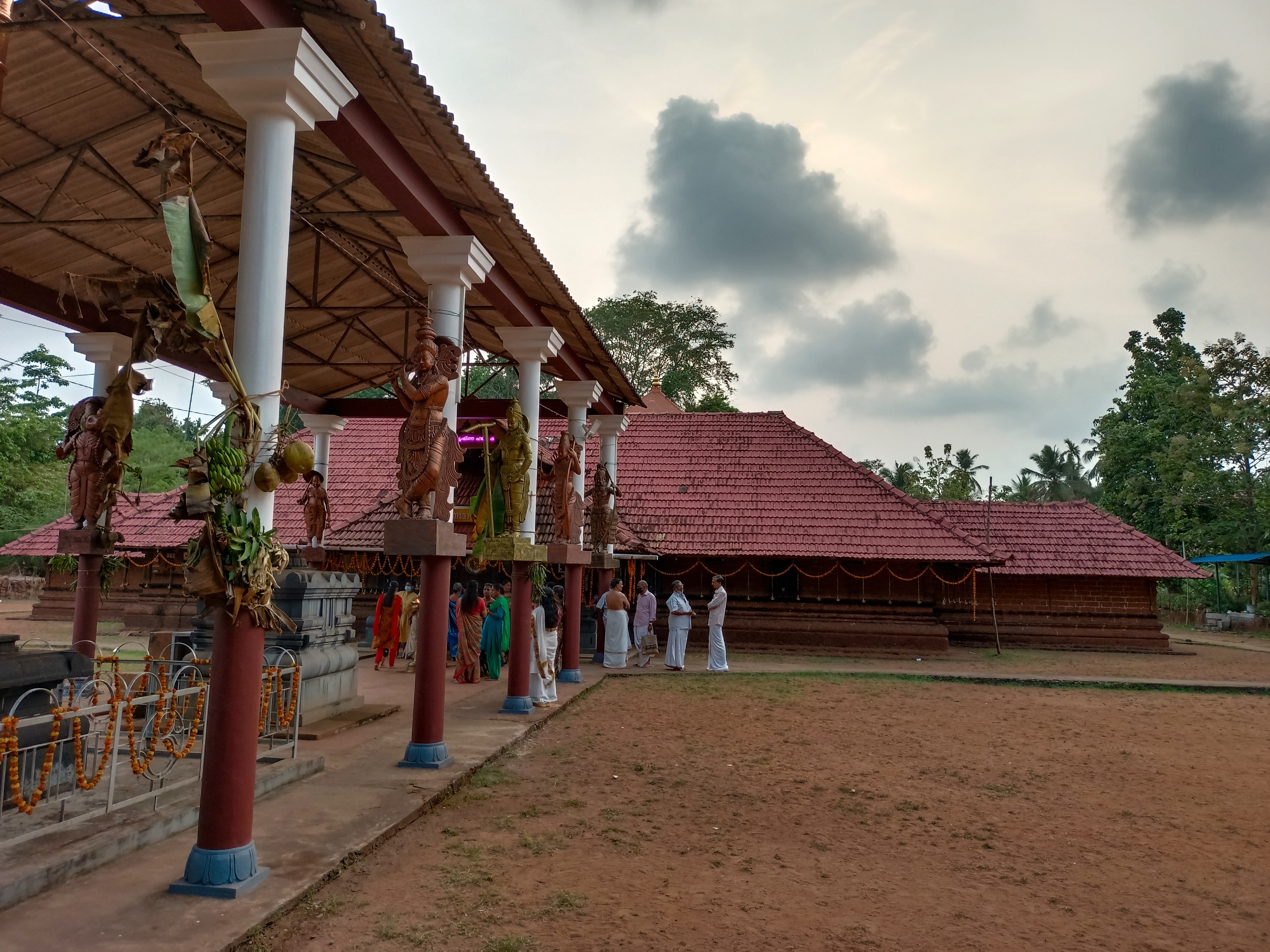
- Chakrapani temple in 2022, during a festival time

- Location within Kerala Location within India Location within Asia

Religion
- Affiliation: Hinduism
- Deity: Vishnu

Location
- Location: Thrikaripur in Kasaragod district
- State: Kerala
- Country: India
- Coordinates: 12.1305994°N 75.1758572°E

Architecture
- Type: Kerala architecture

Sree Chakrapani Temple is a Hindu temple to Vishnu at Thrikaripur in Kasaragod district of Kerala, India. According to myths, the temple was built by Parashurama. It is also one of the temples in Kerala with historical significance. Although the exact age of the temple is not known, Tamil inscriptions here state that the temple was rebuilt in the Malayalam year 410 (1235 CE).

== Historical significance ==
It is also one of the temples with historical significance, believed to have been installed by Parashurama himself as Shatru Samharamurti (destroyer of enemies).

It is said that even when Tipu Sultan's army destroyed many Hindu temples in North Malabar, his army could not reach the temple here. Legend has it that Tipu's army that came to attack the temple was chased away by a herd of elephants.

=== Tamil Inscriptions ===
Inscriptions carved on the walls of the garbhagriha and the prakaram are in Tamil, which clearly indicates that Tamil was once the predominant language spoken in these regions. Historians like M.R. Raghava Warrier say that the temple's 'Sanskritized' Tamil script indicates the presence of Vaishnava cult in northern Kerala as well. Although the exact age of the temple is not known, inscriptions here state that the temple was rebuilt in the Malayalam year 410 (1235 CE), Makaram 27.

== Deity ==
The temple is dedicated to Vishnu. Chakra Pani meaning "the one who holds chakra in his hand" is another name of Vishnu. It is believed that the four-armed Vishnu idol was consecrated here by Parashurama. Ganapati, Vanashastha and Durga are the sub deities here.

== Myths ==
=== Salvation of Gajendra ===
According to myths, a Pandya king named 'Indradyumna' who was cursed by sage Agastya turned into an elephant named 'Gajendra' and a Gandharva named 'Huhu' who was cursed by Devas turned into a crocodile. The crocodile bit the leg of the 'Gajendra' that came down to the lotus pond (chira) for bathing. Unable to reach the shore, the elephant picked up a lotus flower from the pond and prayed to Vishnu. Then Vishnu arrived sitting on Garuda came and saved the elephant by cutting off the head of the crocodile with his Sudarshana Chakra. It is believed that they both got salvation immediately, with the blessings of Vishnu. This is the legend related to this temple.

People who pray here believe that Vishnu will come as their savior when crises bite their legs like a crocodile.

=== Myth related to Vilwamangalam ===
There is also a legend that Vilwamangalam Swami performed bhajans here on the basis of Guruvayurappan's advice to attain salvation.

=== Beliefs related to the pond ===
There are also beliefs related to the temple pond which is believed to be the place where Gajendra attained salvation. There is a belief among devotes that bathing in this pool will cure skin diseases. So many people come to take a dip in the pond as a prayer.

== Condition ==
Due to age, the temple also suffered a lot of damage. Following this, money was collected from devotees to rebuild the dilapidated temple. The temple shrine was renovated in 2012, at a cost of 10 million rupees.

The centuries-old temple pond, which never dries up even in hot summers, is deteriorating without protection. The old stone steps are broken and destroyed. The area of the ponds has been greatly reduced due to landslides on all four sides.
