= Tamil bell =

Indian bronze bell found in 19th century New Zealand

The Tamil Bell is part of a bronze bell inscribed with Tamil script, acquired in approximately 1836 by missionary William Colenso. It was reportedly being used as a pot to boil potatoes by Māori women near Whangārei in the Northland Region of New Zealand. Its presence in New Zealand, at a time when there was no trade between Māori and any part of Asia, means it can be considered an out-of-place artifact. There is no definitive explanation for how it reached New Zealand.

== History ==
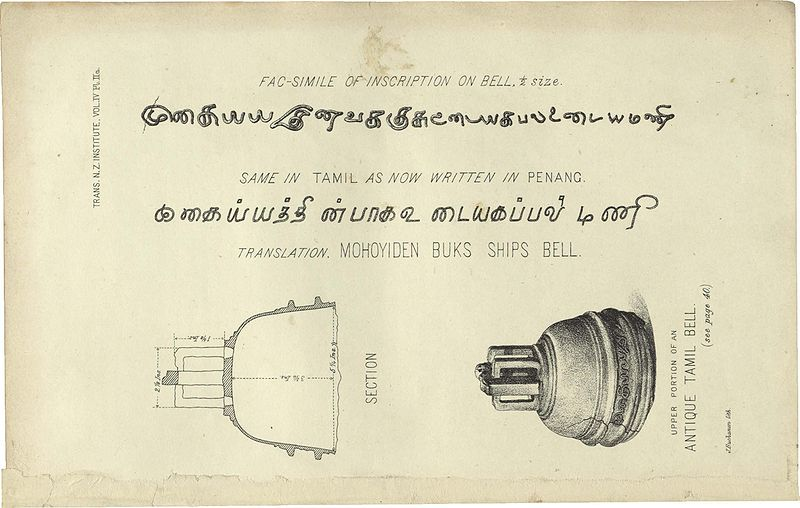
Bell with its inscription and translation

The date that Colenso encountered the bell differs between sources, with "the 1830s", 1836, and 1841 all stated across articles on the bell.

According to William Colenso, he noticed the object when visiting a Māori village in the North Island in the 1830s, being the first European to visit the village. He noticed it being used as a cooking pot for "potatoes", though these may have been kūmara. Cooking with bronze pots would have been unusual for Māori at the time, as bronze was not produced on the island and Māori had no trade routes that would have provided it. Māori at the time cooked by placing heated stones in a wooden vessel. According to Colenso, the women of the village said it had been with them for many years, and that it had been found in tree roots after a storm toppled the tree. He recognized the object as part of a ship's bell, and traded a cast iron pot for it.

Some details of this story have been challenged. In particular, the small size of the bell has raised questions as to if it would have been big enough to cook with.

When Colenso died in 1899, it was bequeathed to the Colonial Museum – now the Museum of New Zealand Te Papa Tongarewa. It remains today in Te Papa's collection, though it has been loaned out for research and was displayed in the Indian Heritage Centre in Singapore.

== Description ==
The object is the crown of a ship's bell, made of bronze. It is 13 cm long and 9 cm deep. It has an inscription in Tamil script, reading Mukaiyyatīṉ vakkucu uṭaiya kappal uṭaiya maṇi (which has been translated as "Mohoyiden Buks ship's bell").

== Research and theories ==
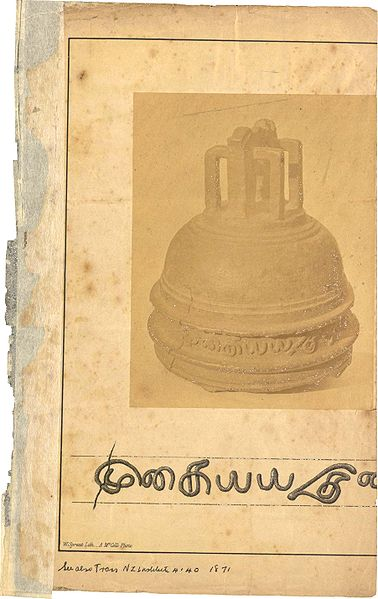
Bell from a different source

The bell was the subject of study as early as the 1860s. Colenso wrote of the bell in 1865, "It is believed that this ancient relic may yet prove to be an important witness... Its tale has yet to be told." The most recent significant research on the bell was by Nalina Gopal, a museum curator from Singapore's Indian Heritage Centre.

Researchers, such as some examining the bell in the 1970s, concluded that the script was an archaic form of Tamil, suggesting the bell might date from 1400–1540, possibly from the Later Pandya period. In 2019, Gopal worked with other experts to date the script instead to the 17th or 18th century. The phrase "Mohideen Bux" (which might also be written in English as "Mohideen Baksh" or "Mohaideen Bakhsh") was a common name for ships sailing from Tamil Nadu. Many Muslim merchant communities in Southeast Asia revered a saint of that name, and named ships after the saint to afford the ship protection. Gopal speculated that the inscription meant that the ship was under the care of the saint. There is no definitive explanation of how the bell came to be in New Zealand. It is known that Tamil traders sailed as far as the southern tip of Madagascar and to what is today Indonesia, but there is no record of them reaching New Zealand. Gopal's research could not identify any lost trade networks that could explain its passage, or identify a particular ship it could have come from.

Explanations presented for the bell include:

- Indologist V. R. Ramachandra Dikshitar stated in his 1947 work The Origin and Spread of the Tamils that ancient Tamil sea-farers might have had a knowledge of Australia and Polynesia. Seafarers from Trincomalee may have reached New Zealand during the period of increased trade between the Vanni country and Southeast Asia.
- Pacific historian Robert Langdon suggested that Spanish sailors were marooned in French Polynesia in the 1500s, and their descendants brought the bell to New Zealand.
- The bell might have been dropped off the shore by a Portuguese ship, whose sailors had been in touch with the Indians.
- An abandoned ghost ship could have floated from the Indian Ocean and wrecked on the west coast of New Zealand, particularly if it was an Indian vessel captured by Europeans and then wrecked.

The bell in itself is not considered proof of early Tamil contact with New Zealand.

== Cultural significance ==
The Tamil Bell is one of the most popular objects in Te Papa's collection. Te Papa has produced a 3D scan of the bell to assist researchers.

The Tamil Bell has become an object of significance to some present-day Tamil people living in New Zealand. Raveen Annamalai, who founded the Aotearoa New Zealand Federation of Tamil Sangam, said in 2023: "The Tamil bell is really significant to me and my fellow Tamilians... We feel very proud that there is some connection between the Tamil community and tangata whenua."

== See also ==
- Indian copper plate inscriptions
- Laguna Copperplate Inscription
- Pallava script
- Tamil copper-plate inscriptions
- Tamil inscriptions
- Tamil script
- Theory of Portuguese discovery of Australia
