= Tamil-Brahmi =

Historical abugida script for Tamil

Tamil-Brahmi 𑀢𑀫𑀺𑀵𑁰 𑀧𑁰𑀭𑀸𑀳𑁰𑀫𑀻
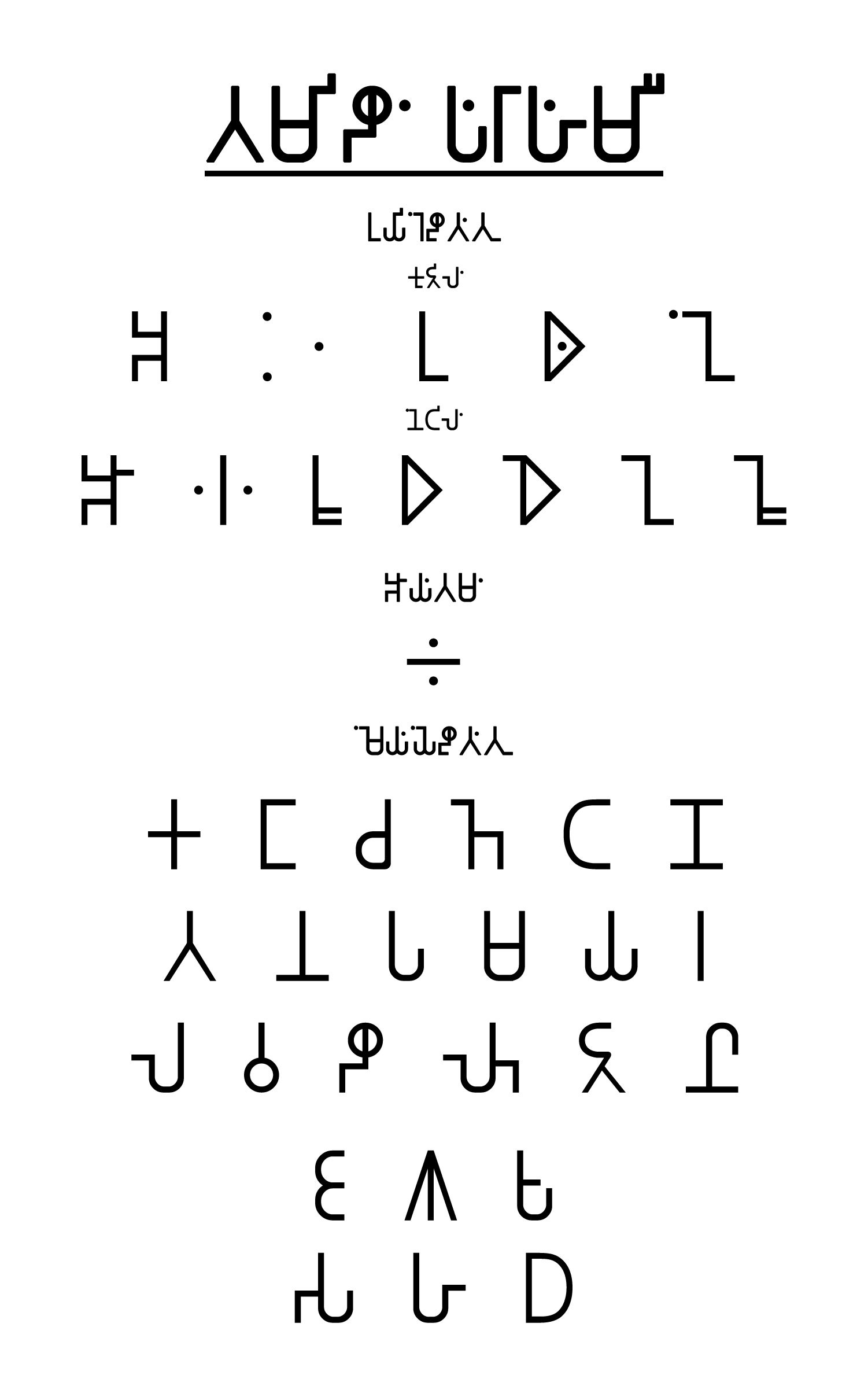
- Tamil Brahmi Abugida Chart in modern typeface. The first two rows are vowels, the special symbol āyta eḻuttu, and the remaining are consonants.
- Script type: Abugida
- Period: c. 3rd century BCE—c. 1st century CE
- Direction: Left-to-right
- Languages: Old Tamil

Related scripts
- Parent systems: Egyptian hieroglyphs: Proto-Sinaitic; Phoenician; Aramaic; Brahmi; Tamil-Brahmi
- Child systems: Vatteluttu, Pallava
- Sister systems: Bhattiprolu, Gupta, Tocharian

ISO 15924
- ISO 15924: Brah (300), Brahmi

Unicode
- Unicode alias: Brahmi
- Unicode range: U+11000–U+1107F
- The theorised Semitic origins of the Brahmi script are not universally agreed upon.

Tamili (Old Tamil: 𑀢𑀫𑀺𑀵𑀺, romanized: tamiḻi), also known as Tamil-Brahmi (Old Tamil: 𑀢𑀫𑀺𑀵𑁰 𑀧𑁰𑀭𑀸𑀳𑁰𑀫𑀻, romanized: tamiḻ brāhmi) or Damili, was a variant of the Brahmi script in southern India. It was used to write inscriptions in Old Tamil. The Tamil-Brahmi script has been paleographically and stratigraphically dated between the third century BCE and the first century CE, and it constitutes the earliest known writing system evidenced in many parts of Tamil Nadu, Kerala, Karnataka, Andhra Pradesh and Sri Lanka. Tamil Brahmi inscriptions have been found on cave entrances, stone beds, potsherds, jar burials, coins, seals, and rings.

Tamil Brahmi resembles but differs in several minor ways from the Brahmi inscriptions found elsewhere on the Indian subcontinent such as the Edicts of Ashoka found in Andhra Pradesh. It adds diacritics to several letters for sounds not found in Prakrit, producing ṉ ṟ ṛ ḷ. Secondly, in many of the inscriptions the inherent vowel has been discarded: A consonant written without diacritics represents the consonant alone, whereas the Ashokan diacritic for long ā is used for both ā and short a in Tamil-Brahmi. This is unique to Tamil-Brahmi and Bhattiprolu among the early Indian scripts. Tamil-Brahmi does not, however, share the odd forms of letters such as gh in Bhattiprolu. This appears to be an adaptation to Dravidian phonotactics, where words commonly end in consonants, as opposed to Prakrit, where this never occurs. According to Mahadevan, in the earliest stages of the script the inherent vowel was either abandoned, as above, or the bare consonant was ambiguous as to whether it implied a short a or not. Later stages of Tamil Brahmi returned to the inherent vowel that was the norm in ancient India.

According to Kamil Zvelebil, Tamil-Brahmi script was the parent script that ultimately evolved into the later Vatteluttu and Tamil scripts.

== Origins ==
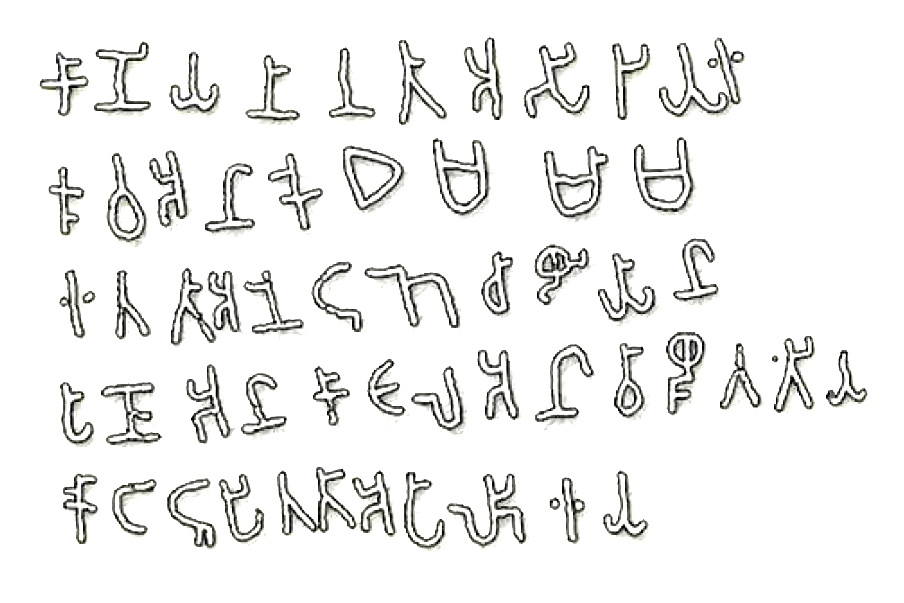
Mangulam Tamil-Brahmi inscription at Dakshin Chithra, Chennai. It was discovered by Robert Sewell in 1882, and deciphered by Subrahmanya Aiyar in 1924.

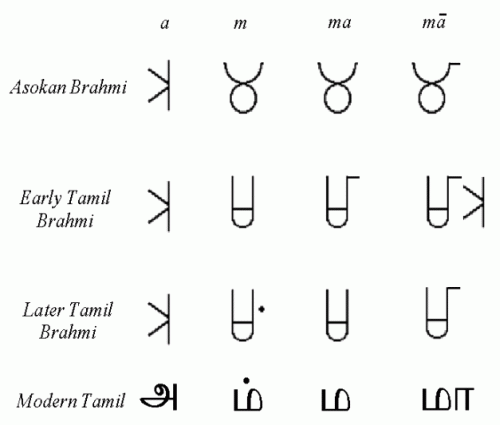
Tamili/Tamil brahmi script spelling out Mother ('Amma' in tamil) – here the letter 'ma' (third letter here) is shown to show how the letter 'maa' (fourth letter here) has been achieved ('ma'+'a'). The word 'Amma' has only the first, second and the last letters – 'A' + 'm' + 'mā' – அ + ம்+ மா

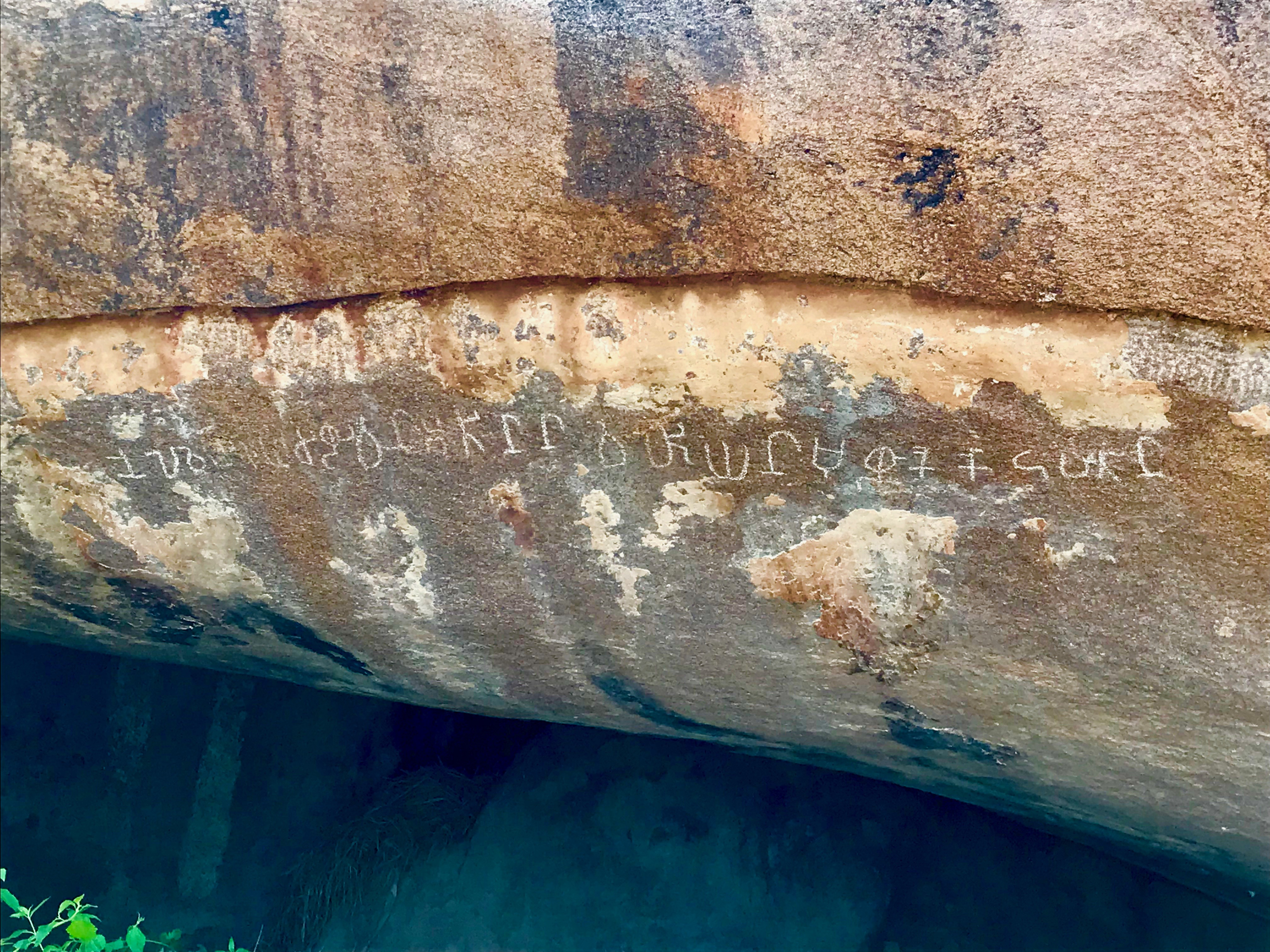
A 2nd-century BCE Tamil Brahmi inscription from Arittapatti, Madurai India. The southern state of Tamil Nadu has emerged as a major source of Brahmi inscriptions dated between the 3rd and 1st centuries BCE.

=== Early Tamil scripts ===
An early mention of a script for writing the Tamil language is found in the Jaina work Samavayanga Sutta and Pannavana Sutta where a script called Damili is mentioned as the seventeenth of eighteen Lipi (scripts) in use in India. Similarly, the tenth chapter of the Lalitavistara, named Lipisala samdarshana parivarta, lists Dravida-lipi and Dakshinya-lipi as two of sixty four scripts that Siddhartha (later the Gautam Buddha) learnt as a child from his gurus in Vedic schools, a list that is found in both Indian Buddhist texts and its ancient Chinese translations. These relationship of early Tamil scripts to these lipi mentioned in Jaina and Buddhist literature relationship is unclear. The pre-1974 work of Mahadevan had established 76 rock inscriptions in Tamil Brahmi from about 21 sites in Tamil Nadu, which states Kamil Zvelebil "establish obvious correlations" with what has been found in early Tamil bardic poems. Nagaswamy treats Tamil-Brahmi script to be synonymous with the Damili script in his publications.

Artifacts such as inscribed potsherds, coins or others are found in Tamil Nadu archaeological sites have graffiti and inscriptions. The potsherds recovered from Kodumanal, for example, have markings that on the basis of stratigraphical analysis appear to be from the 4th century BCE. According to K. Rajan, the "large number of graffiti marks and subsequent Tamil Brahmi script" unearthed in Tamil Nadu and Kerala suggest that this region had a "linguistic cohesiveness well before 5th–4th century BCE". According to Falk these supposed inscriptions are not Brahmi letters, but misinterpreted non-linguistic Megalithic graffiti symbols, which were used in South India during the pre-literate era.

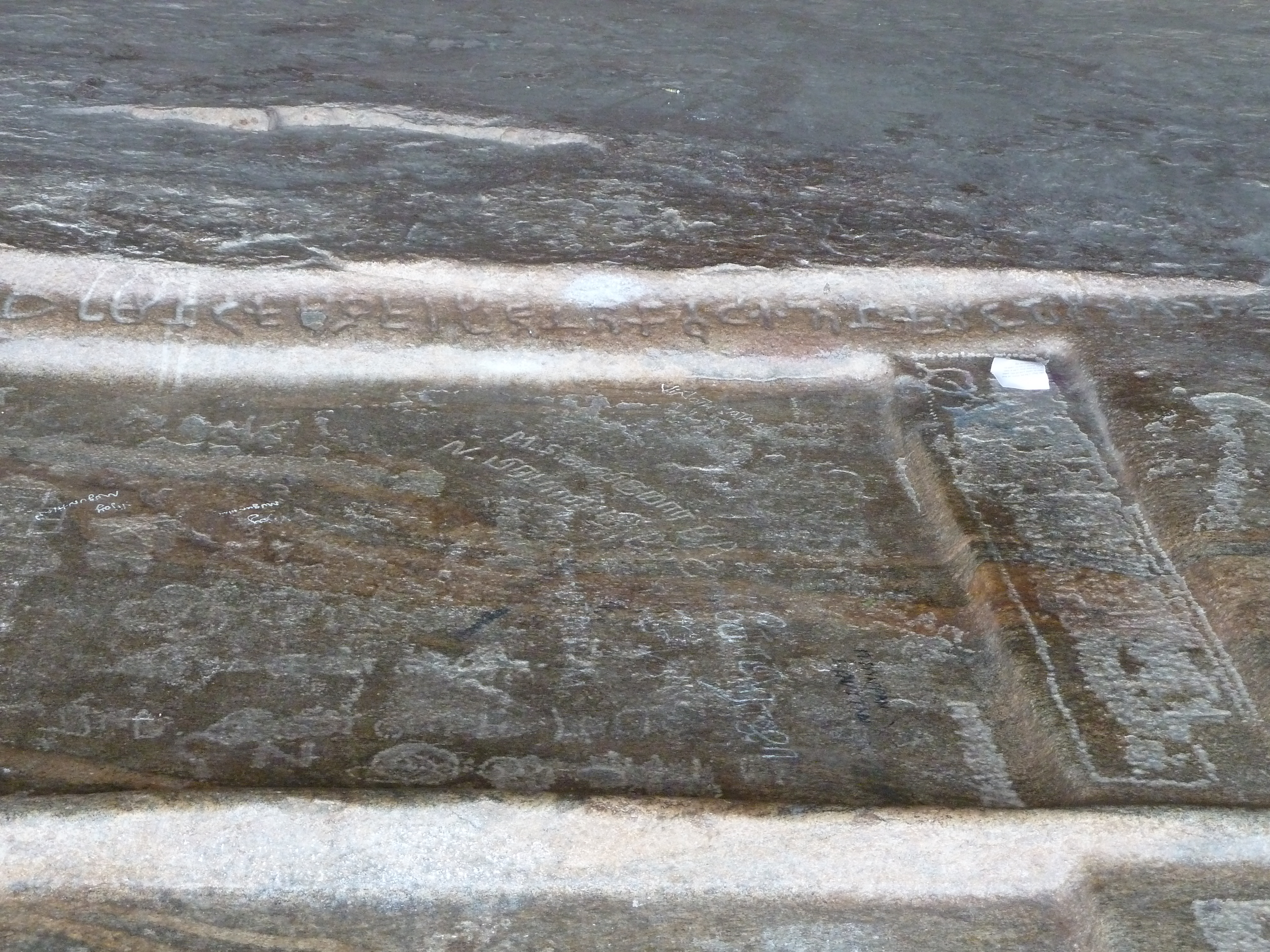
Stone bed with inscription in Sittanavasal, Tamil Brahmi Inscriptions

=== Before the 1990s ===
The origins and chronology of Tamil Brahmi are unclear. Several hypotheses have been proposed, with the views of epigraphist Iravatham Mahadevan being generally accepted. According to Mahadevan, the Brahmi script from North India arrived via the southern inscriptions of Ashoka, and evolved into the Tamil Brahmi. This theory presupposes that the Brahmi script itself was either originated within the imperial courts of Mauryan kingdom or evolved from a more ancient foreign script and it was dispersed to South India and Sri Lanka after the 3rd century BCE. The alternate theory proposed by Nagaswamy is that there was an indigenous common source (proto-Vatteluttu) script from which both northern and southern Brahmi script emerged, which he respectively terms as Brahmi and Damili scripts. Richard Salomon favors the Mahadevan theory.

According to Kamil Zvelebil's chronology proposal of 1973, the earliest Tamil Brahmi inscriptions such as the Netunceliyan rock inscriptions at the Mangulam site were derived from Ashokan Brahmi that was introduced to the Tamil region around 250 BCE. It was adapted for the Tamil language by 220 BCE and led to the standardization of the Tamil language and literary norms of Maturai between 200 and 50 BCE. These developments transformed the oral bardic Tamil literary culture to the written Sangam literature in the centuries that followed. The use of Tamil Brahmi continued through the 6th century CE, states Zvelebil.

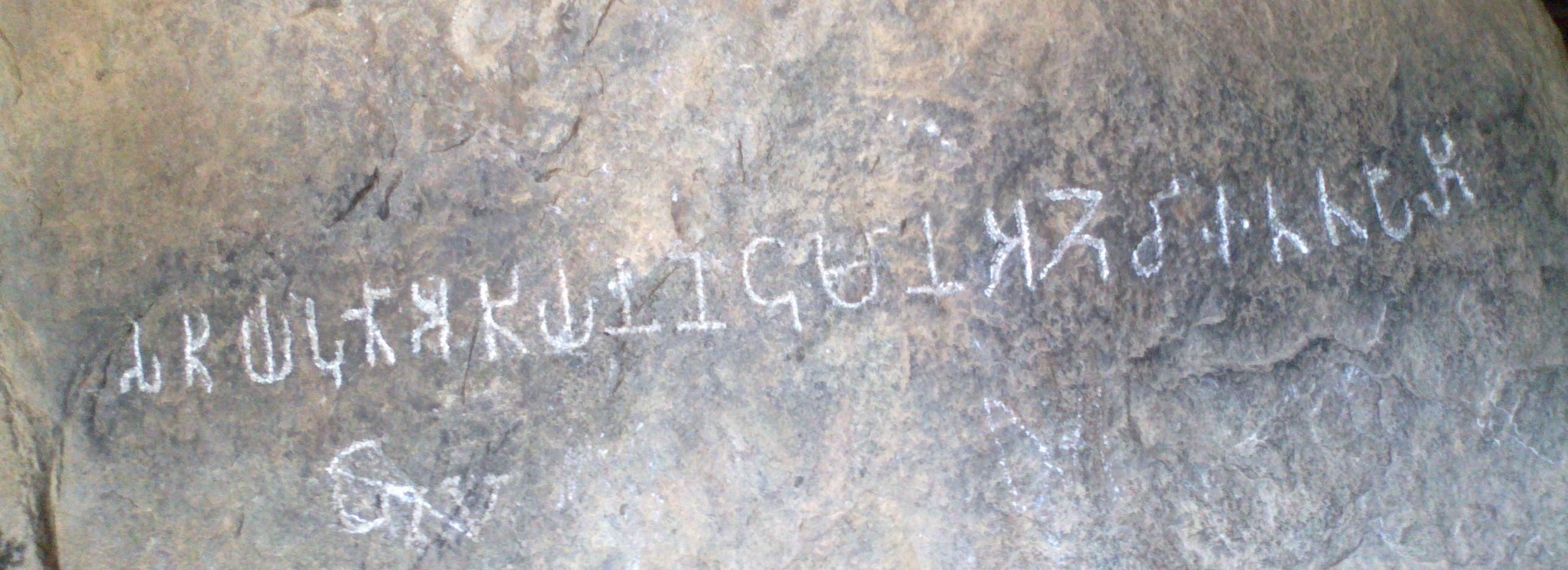
Jambai Tamil Brahmi inscription

=== Conflicting theories about origin since 1990s ===
Since the 1990s, pre-Ashokan dates have been proposed based on excavations and discoveries of graphite covered ancient remains in Sri Lanka. These include those found in Anuradhapura in Sri Lanka, some of which have been dated to the 4th century BCE. The findings of Coningham et al based on the carbon dating of excavated potsherds led to the proposal that the Sri Lankan Brahmi developed before the Ashokan era, at least by the 5th to 4th century BCE, from where it came to Tamil region evolving into the Tamil Brahmi, and thereafter spread across South Asia due to trade networks. Sri Lankan nationalists have used this and other fragments of Black-and-Red Ware and Red Ware with Brahmi characters to state that Brahmi was invented on the island and from there it migrated north into the Indian subcontinent. This theory has been criticized by Harry Falk – a scholar of Brahmi and other ancient Indian scripts. First, states Falk, the Coningham team has admitted later that they did not use the carbon dating correction necessary for the Southern hemisphere and used the calibration curves for north Pakistan. Second, the Sri Lankan teams also erred when they deployed a "mathematical trick" whereby they conflated the contested date of lower strata that lacked inscribed shreds with the upper strata where the shreds with Brahmi script were found. According to Falk, a critical study of the feature differences between Ceylonese (Sri Lankan) Brahmi, Tamil Brahmi and Ashokan Brahmi suggest that "all the differences can only be explained once the Ashokan script is taken as primary and the two others as derivations". It is not scholarship that is behind the claims that Ceylonese Brahmi is more ancient and gave rise to Tamil Brahmi and Ashokan Brahmi, rather it is "regional chauvinism", states Falk.

The graffiti and Brahmi found at sites in Sri Lanka are related, but not considered to be examples of Tamil-Brahmi. Archaeological teams sponsored by the government of Tamil Nadu have also been actively unearthing sites and reporting their results in local media that they have found shreds and items with Tamil Brahmi inscriptions. Between 2011 and 2013, for example, Rajan and Yatheeskumar published their findings from excavations at Porunthal and Kodumanal in Tamil Nadu, where numerous graffiti and inscription fragments on archaeological pieces have been unearthed. The radiocarbon dates of paddy grains and charcoal samples found along with potsherds with inscriptions provided a radiometric date of about 520–490 BCE, which state Rajan and Yatheeskumar implies that the inscriptions too are from the same period. Based on Carbon-14 dating by an American laboratory, Rajan suggests Tamil Brahmi had been invented by 490 BCE, and states, "it is almost clear now that Ashoka did not developed (sic) the Brahmi script. The origin or evolution of a script is a social process and it could not be associated with a particular individual or dynasty." According to Harry Falk, Rajan's claims are "particularly ill-informed". Some of the earliest supposed inscriptions are not Brahmi letters at all, but merely misinterpreted Megalithic graffiti symbols, which were used in South India for several centuries during the pre-literate era. The stirrups reportedly found with the shreds are suspicious. Falk considers these reports as "regional chauvinism" just like the Sri Lankan claims of their island being the origin of a Brahmi script from which the Tamil-Brahmi developed. Linguist David Shulman concurs that there are reasons to be skeptical of pre-Ashokan dates for Tamil-Brahmi, but recommends that one should keep an open mind.

== The script ==
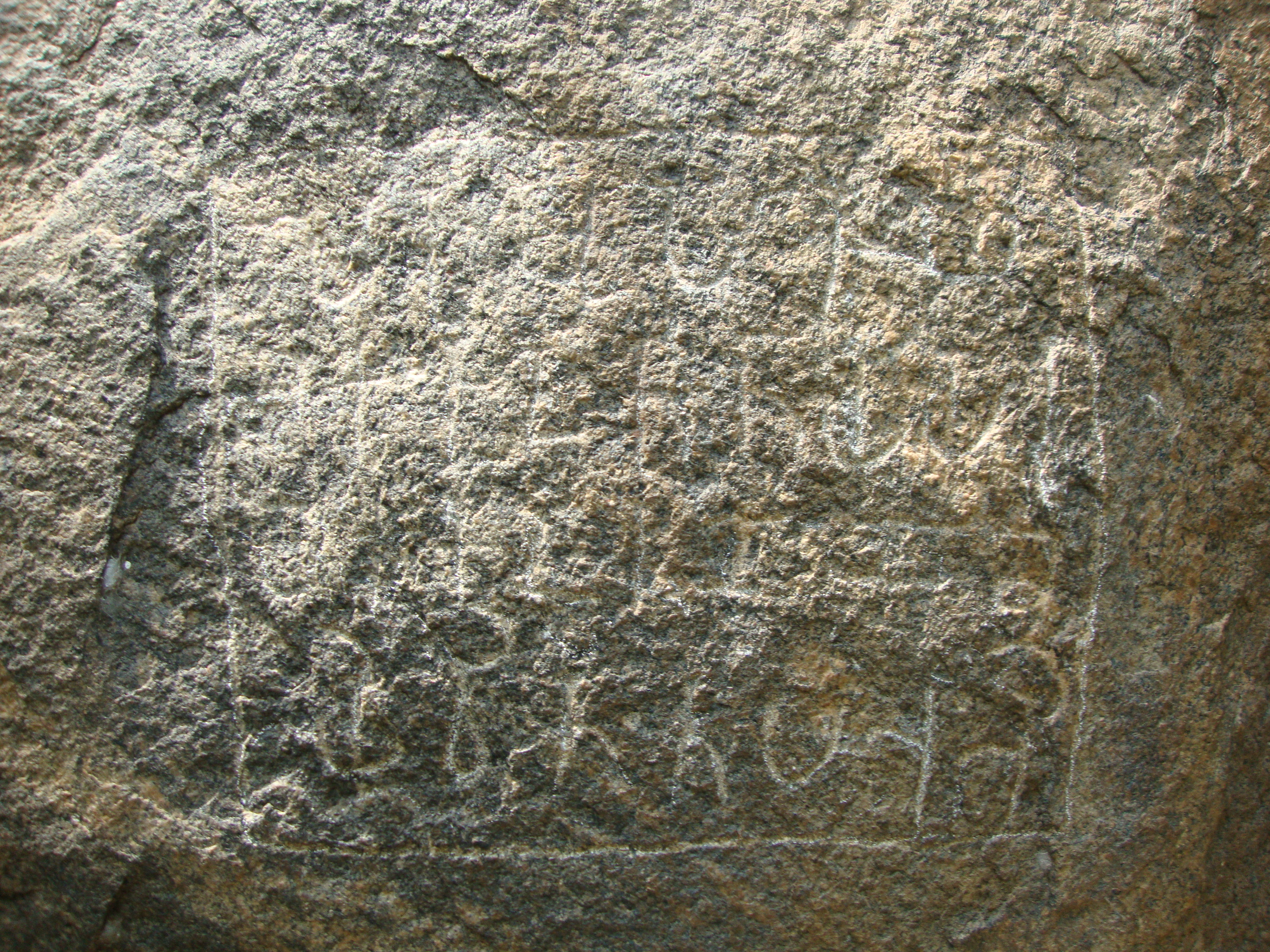
Nehanurpatti Tamil Brahmi inscription

Tamil-Brahmi had notable peculiarities when compared to the Standard Brahmi. It had four different characters to represent Dravidian language phonemes not represented in the standard northern-based Brahmi used to write Prakrit languages. The closest resemblance to Tamil-Brahmi is to its neighboring Sinhala-Brahmi. Both seem to use similar letters to indicate phonemes that are unique to Dravidian languages although Sinhala-Brahmi was used to write an Indo-Aryan Prakrit used in the island of Sri Lanka possibly from ongoing maritime relationship with Gujarat and other parts of India.

The Tamil Brahmi script found in ancient Tamil inscriptions is not consistent. It appears to have existed in three different versions between the 2nd century BCE and 3rd century CE. The third version, assumed to be the basis for early Tolkāppiyam, evolved into the modern Tamil script.

The Bhattiprolu script is related to the Tamil-Brahmi, and is found in nine early inscriptions on stupa relic caskets discovered at Bhattiprolu (Andhra Pradesh). According to Richard Salomon, the Bhattiprolu script reflects innovations in a Dravidian language context, rather than Indo-Aryan languages. Both the Bhattiprolu and Tamil Brahmi share common modifications to represent Dravidian languages. The Bhattiprolu was likely a provincial offshoot of early southern Brahmi script, states Salomon.

According to Iravatham Mahathevan there are three stages in the development of the script. The early stage is dated from the 3rd or 2nd century BCE to 1st century BCE. The later stage is dated from the 1st to 2nd century CE. The third stage is dated from the 2nd century CE to the 3rd or 4th century CE. According to Gift Siromony, the types of Tamil Brahmi writings do not follow a very clear chronology and can lead to confusion in dating. According to K. Rajan, the Ashokan Brahmi corresponds with the Stage II of Tamil Brahmi per Mahadevan’s classification. Hence according to him, Stage I may have to be reassessed from the proposed time line. From the 5th century CE onwards Tamil is written in Vatteluttu in the Chera and Pandya country and Grantha or Tamil script in the Chola and Pallava country. Tamil Brahmi inscriptions in cave beds and coins have provided historians with identifying some kings and chiefs mentioned in the Sangam Tamil corpus as well as related Ashokan pillar inscriptions.

== Usage ==
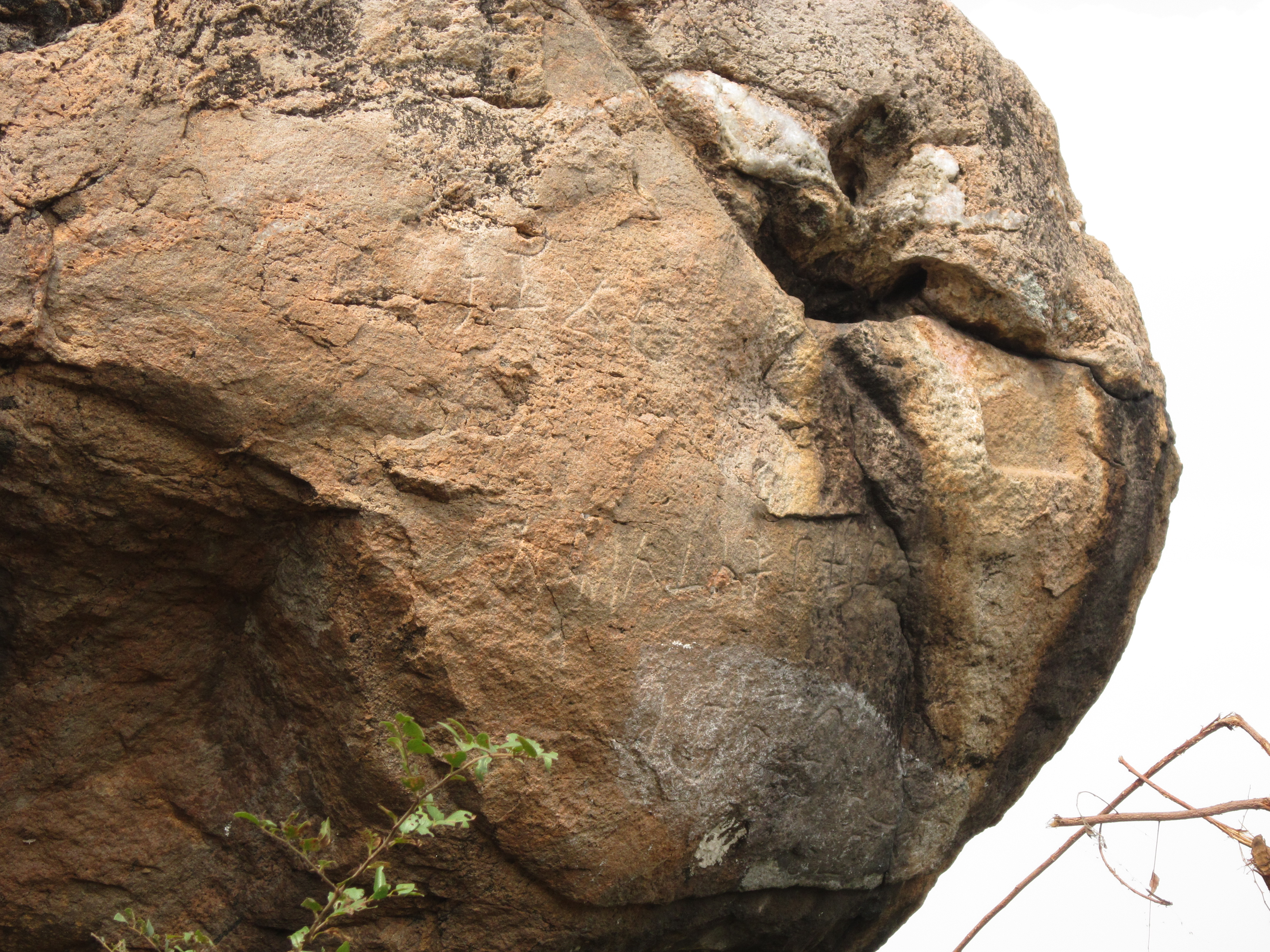
Mamandur rock cut caves Tamil Brahmi

The Tamil Brahmi script inscriptions are predominantly found with ancient Tamil Jaina and Buddhist sites, states Zvelebil. According to Ranjan, all the Tamil-Brahmi inscriptions found in rock caves of Tamil Nadu are related to Jainism. The Tamil-Brahmi inscriptions are also found in secular context such as coins, potsherds and others. According to Zvelebil, its origins likely were with the Jains and the Buddhists, but it was soon understood and used by kings, chiefs, potters and other common people from a variety of backgrounds. This is evidenced by the use of a fused Tamil and Prakrit languages in the secular inscriptions.

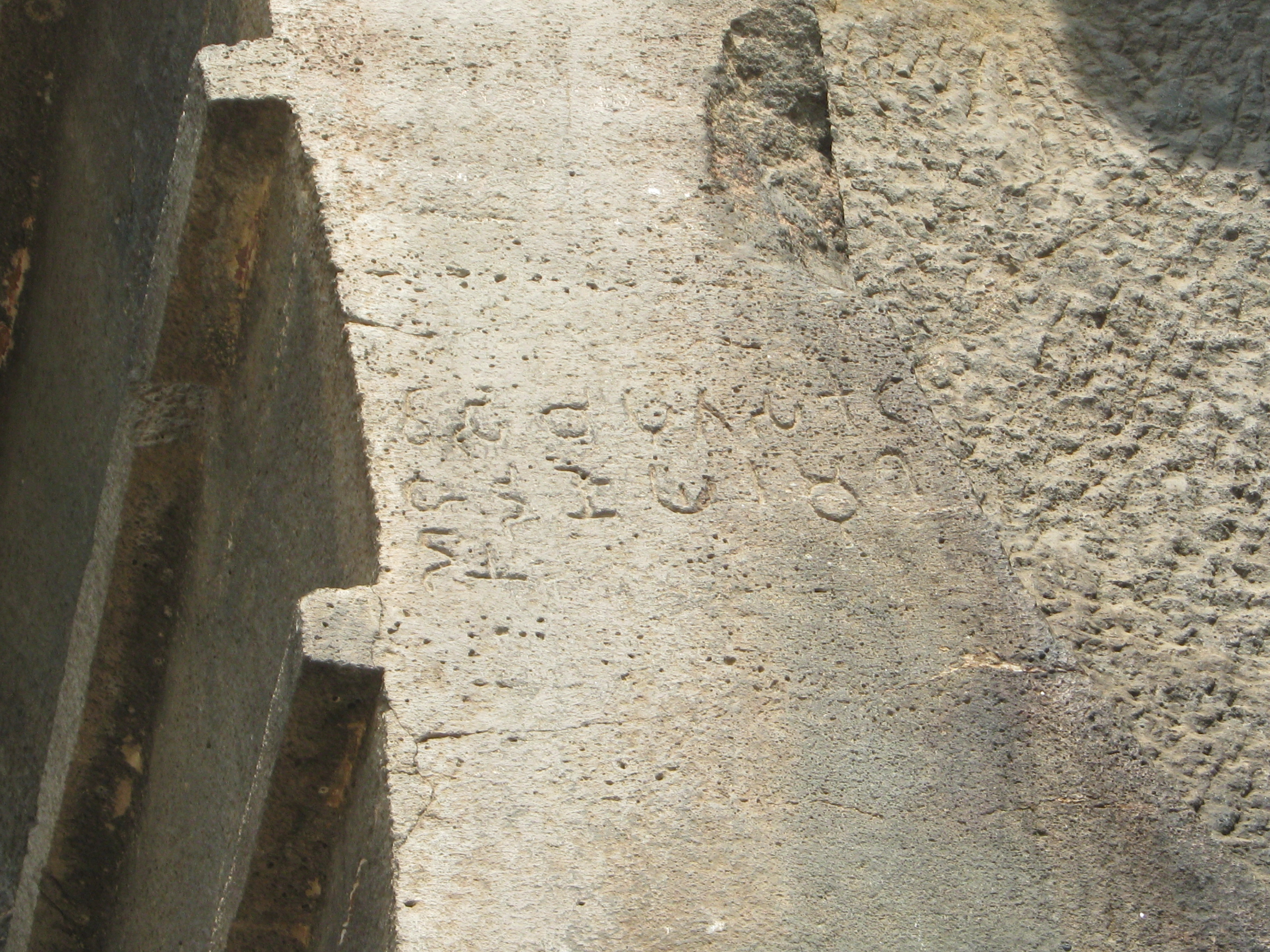
Cave inscriptions in Tamil Brahmi

According to Rajan, certain graffiti marks may imply that the script was used for funerary and other purposes. The language used in most of the religious inscriptions show Prakrit elements and influence. Cave and rock bed Tamil Brahmi inscriptions, as well as those found near Madurai, are typically donatory and dedicated resting places and resources for monks. Other major usages of Tamil Brahmi inscriptions are similar to those found in Andhra Pradesh, such as in coins and those that mention merchants and traders of gold, sugar, iron, salt and textiles. Some Tamil Brahmi inscriptions mention the names of ancient kings, heroes, and places. This has served as an important and a more reliable means to date Tamil literature and history from about the 3rd century BCE and thereafter.

A significant archaeological source of Tamil Brahmi inscriptions has been the region between Palghat gap and Coimbatore along the Kaveri river and to its delta. The excavations here revealed nearly two hundred inscribed potsherds along with items relating to iron-smelting and jewelry manufacturing. These inscribed potsherds contain a mix of ancient Indian languages – mostly in early Tamil in Tamil Brahmi, and some in Prakrit languages in Brahmi. These are dated to about 300 to 200 BCE by archaeo-magnetic analysis. They suggest an economic vibrancy, trade and cultural exchange between ancient Tamil region and other parts of India. A similar mix of Tamil Brahmi and Brahmi script is found in shards, potsherds and rock inscriptions all along the coast of the Bay of Bengal, from Salihundam in northeast Andhra Pradesh to ancient near-coast settlements of Tamil Nadu such as those near Vaddamanu, Amaravati, Arikamedu, Kanchipuram, Vallam, Alagankulam and Korkai.

Discoveries at Kodumanal near Coimbatore have unearthed potsherds with Tamil Brahmi inscriptions dated 300 to 200 BCE. These include names mostly in Tamil language (Kannan Atan, Pannan), as well as some in Sanskrit (Varuni, Visaki). According to Mahadevan, this admixture of a few loan words of north Indian languages written in northern Brahmi with those in Tamil Brahmi is neither abnormal nor exception in the epigraphical evidence discovered in Tamil Nadu. This trend continued in centuries that followed where Tamils inscribed Sanskrit words in the Grantha script. According to Vimala Begley, the recent sherds graffiti discoveries in archaeological sites along the coast of Tamil Nadu such as Arikamedu are a mix of Tamil Brahmi, northern Brahmi and Ceylon-Brahmi scripts, and they inscribe both Tamil and Prakrit languages of India. This likely suggests that ancient Tamil Nadu served as one of the important trade staging regions for the Indian subcontinent and beyond.

== Decipherment ==
A. C. Burnell (1874), attempted the earliest work on South Indian paleography, but it was due to the efforts of K. V. Subrahmanya Aiyar (1924), H. Krishna Sastri and K. K. Pillay that it was understood to be written in an early form of Tamil, not Prakrit. The early attempts assumed more Prakrit loan words than what was actually used, hence the decipherment was not entirely successful. Iravatham Mahadevan identified the writings as mostly consisting of Tamil words in the late 1960s and published them in seminars and proceedings. This was further expanded by T. V. Mahalingam (1967), R. Nagaswamy (1972), R. Panneerselvam (1972) and M. S. Venkataswamy (1981).

== Significant Tamil Brahmi finds ==
=== South Asia ===
- Potsherds with Tamil Brahmi inscriptions found in Poonagari, Jaffna, 2nd century BCE.
- Black and red ware potsherd in Ucchapanai, Kandarodai, Jaffna, 300 BCE
- Locally produced coins with Tamil Brahmi legends were found in the southern town of Tissamaharama.
- a pot rim at Pattanam, central Kerala.
- Edakal cave, Ambukuthi hill, Kerala.
- Kodumanal, Chennimalai near Erode
- Porunthal site is located 12 km South West of Palani
- Tirupparankundram hill, Madurai
- Fifth ‘hero’ stone found with Tamil Brahmi inscriptions at Porpanakkottai
- Thenur, Madurai. Script is written on a gold bar, 300 BCE.
- a laterite in Karadukka in Kasaragod district, Kerala.

=== Middle East ===
- Tamil-Brahmi script dating to 50 CE found at Oman country. Experts explains that the script "nantai kiran" has two components: an honorific suffix for elderly names and a personal name, with over 20 Tamil Sangam age poets including "kiran" in their names.
- Fragments with inscriptions in Tamil Brahmi script have been found – along with other records in Indic languages and scripts – in Quseir-al-Qadim, (Leukos Limen) Egypt, all dated to about the 1st or 2nd century CE. These evidence a trade relationship between Indian traders and Egyptian counterparts. Two earlier Tamil Brahmi inscription discoveries at the same site, 1st century CE. The inscribed text is 𑀧𑀸𑀦𑁃 𑀑𑀶𑀺 paanai oRi "pot suspended in a rope net".
- Evidence unearthed in 2024 and 2025 dating from between the 1st and 3rd centuries CE suggests that travel in the period extended beyond trade. Inscriptions bearing personal names, including examples such as "Cikai Korrin was here" indicate that some individuals left commemorative graffiti implying travel for purposes other than trade.
- An inscribed amphora fragment in Tamil Brahmi at Berenice Troglodytica, Red Sea (Egypt), dated between 1st century BCE and 1st century CE.

=== Southeast and East Asia ===
- Tamil-Brahmi inscriptions in the Tamil language, along with Sanskrit in northern Brahmi script, have been found in archaeological sites of southeast Asian countries such as Thailand, Vietnam, Cambodia and Indonesia. For example, a Goldsmith's touchstone found in Wat Klong Thom (Krabi, Thailand) is among the earliest known Tamil inscription in Tamil Brahmi. It is from the 3rd century CE. This evidence along with other inscriptions found in this region suggests that Tamil goldsmiths were likely settled and working in this region of the southeast Asia in the early centuries of the common era.
- Pottery and other items with Tamil Brahmi inscriptions have been discovered in the Philippines, for example Baybayin, and in Phu Khao Thong, Thailand and Khuan Luk Pat. They are dated to about the 2nd century CE-14th century CE. They are damaged and incomplete but likely refer to some monk (Tamil: turavon). These suggest a trading, religious and cultural exchange between the Tamil region and southeast Asia. The Tamil Brahmi inscriptions and items unearthed since the 1980s in this region suggest that the cultural and economic exchange included mixed themes with shades of Buddhism and Hinduism.
- The Tamil Brahmi and the northern (Ashokan) Brahmi inscriptions found in Siamo-Malay peninsula and Vietnam are the earliest known evidence of writing in southeast Asia.

== Letters ==
=== Basic consonants ===
Tamil-Brahmi is an abugida. Consonants are classified like the later Tamil script into vallinam (hard), mellinam (soft) and idaiyinam (medium) groups. Each consonant letter carries an inherent a.

Tamil-Brahmi consonants
Consonant	ISO 15919	Category	IPA
𑀓	k	vallinam	/k/
𑀗	ṅ	mellinam	/ŋ/
𑀘	c	vallinam	/t͡ʃ, s/
𑀜	ñ	mellinam	/ɲ/
𑀝	ṭ	vallinam	/ʈ/
𑀡	ṇ	mellinam	/ɳ/
𑀢	t	vallinam	/t̪/
𑀦	n	mellinam	/n̪/
𑀧	p	vallinam	/p/
𑀫	m	mellinam	/m/
𑀬	y	idaiyinam	/j/
𑀭	r	idaiyinam	/ɾ/
𑀮	l	idaiyinam	/l̪/
𑀯	v	idaiyinam	/v/
𑀵	ḻ	idaiyinam	/ɻ/
𑀴	ḷ	idaiyinam	/ɭ/
𑀶	ṟ	vallinam	/r/
𑀷	ṉ	mellinam	/n/

=== Vowels ===
Tamil-Brahmi has independent vowel letters and vowel signs that attach to a consonant. Early inscriptions do not mark vowel length for e and o.

Tamil-Brahmi vowels
Independent	Vowel sign	ISO 15919	IPA
𑀅	—N/a	a	/ɐ/
𑀆	◌𑀸	ā	/aː/
𑀇	◌𑀺	i	/i/
𑀈	◌𑀻	ī	/iː/
𑀉	◌𑀼	u	/u/
𑀊	◌𑀽	ū	/uː/
𑀏	◌𑁂	e, ē	/e, eː/
𑀐	◌𑁃	ai	/ɐi̯/
𑀑	◌𑁄	o, ō	/o, oː/
𑀒	◌𑁅	au	/ɐu̯/

==== Compound form ====
Using the consonant 'k' as an example:

Formation	Compound form	ISO 15919	IPA
𑀓𑁆 + 𑀅	𑀓	ka	/kɐ/
𑀓𑁆 + 𑀆	𑀓𑀸	kā	/kaː/
𑀓𑁆 + 𑀇	𑀓𑀺	ki	/ki/
𑀓𑁆 + 𑀈	𑀓𑀻	kī	/kiː/
𑀓𑁆 + 𑀉	𑀓𑀼	ku	/ku/
𑀓𑁆 + 𑀊	𑀓𑀽	kū	/kuː/
𑀓𑁆 + 𑀏	𑀓𑁂	ke, kē	/ke, keː/
𑀓𑁆 + 𑀐	𑀓𑁃	kai	/kɐi̯/
𑀓𑁆 + 𑀑	𑀓𑁄	ko, kō	/ko, koː/
𑀓𑁆 + 𑀒	𑀓𑁅	kau	/kɐu̯/

==== Compound table of Tamil-Brahmi letters ====
The following table lists vowel letters across the top and consonant letters along the side, the combination of which gives all compound letters.

Consonants		Vowels									
Consonants		∅ a	◌𑀸 ā	◌𑀺 i	◌𑀻 ī	◌𑀼 u	◌𑀽 ū	◌𑁂 e	◌𑁃 ai	◌𑁄 o	◌𑁅 au
∅ (Independent)		𑀅	𑀆	𑀇	𑀈	𑀉	𑀊	𑀏	𑀐	𑀑	𑀒
𑀓𑀁	k	𑀓	𑀓𑀸	𑀓𑀺	𑀓𑀻	𑀓𑀼	𑀓𑀽	𑀓𑁂	𑀓𑁃	𑀓𑁄	𑀓𑁅
𑀗𑀁	ṅ	𑀗	𑀗𑀸	𑀗𑀺	𑀗𑀻	𑀗𑀼	𑀗𑀽	𑀗𑁂	𑀗𑁃	𑀗𑁄	𑀗𑁅
𑀘𑀁	c	𑀘	𑀘𑀸	𑀘𑀺	𑀘𑀻	𑀘𑀼	𑀘𑀽	𑀘𑁂	𑀘𑁃	𑀘𑁄	𑀘𑁅
𑀜𑀁	ñ	𑀜	𑀜𑀸	𑀜𑀺	𑀜𑀻	𑀜𑀼	𑀜𑀽	𑀜𑁂	𑀜𑁃	𑀜𑁄	𑀜𑁅
𑀝𑀁	ṭ	𑀝	𑀝𑀸	𑀝𑀺	𑀝𑀻	𑀝𑀼	𑀝𑀽	𑀝𑁂	𑀝𑁃	𑀝𑁄	𑀝𑁅
𑀡𑀁	ṇ	𑀡	𑀡𑀸	𑀡𑀺	𑀡𑀻	𑀡𑀼	𑀡𑀽	𑀡𑁂	𑀡𑁃	𑀡𑁄	𑀡𑁅
𑀢𑀁	t	𑀢	𑀢𑀸	𑀢𑀺	𑀢𑀻	𑀢𑀼	𑀢𑀽	𑀢𑁂	𑀢𑁃	𑀢𑁄	𑀢𑁅
𑀦𑀁	n	𑀦	𑀦𑀸	𑀦𑀺	𑀦𑀻	𑀦𑀼	𑀦𑀽	𑀦𑁂	𑀦𑁃	𑀦𑁄	𑀦𑁅
𑀧𑀁	p	𑀧	𑀧𑀸	𑀧𑀺	𑀧𑀻	𑀧𑀼	𑀧𑀽	𑀧𑁂	𑀧𑁃	𑀧𑁄	𑀧𑁅
𑀫𑀁	m	𑀫	𑀫𑀸	𑀫𑀺	𑀫𑀻	𑀫𑀼	𑀫𑀽	𑀫𑁂	𑀫𑁃	𑀫𑁄	𑀫𑁅
𑀬𑀁	y	𑀬	𑀬𑀸	𑀬𑀺	𑀬𑀻	𑀬𑀼	𑀬𑀽	𑀬𑁂	𑀬𑁃	𑀬𑁄	𑀬𑁅
𑀭𑀁	r	𑀭	𑀭𑀸	𑀭𑀺	𑀭𑀻	𑀭𑀼	𑀭𑀽	𑀭𑁂	𑀭𑁃	𑀭𑁄	𑀭𑁅
𑀮𑀁	l	𑀮	𑀮𑀸	𑀮𑀺	𑀮𑀻	𑀮𑀼	𑀮𑀽	𑀮𑁂	𑀮𑁃	𑀮𑁄	𑀮𑁅
𑀯𑀁	v	𑀯	𑀯𑀸	𑀯𑀺	𑀯𑀻	𑀯𑀼	𑀯𑀽	𑀯𑁂	𑀯𑁃	𑀯𑁄	𑀯𑁅
𑀵𑀁	ḻ	𑀵	𑀵𑀸	𑀵𑀺	𑀵𑀻	𑀵𑀼	𑀵𑀽	𑀵𑁂	𑀵𑁃	𑀵𑁄	𑀵𑁅
𑀴𑀁	ḷ	𑀴	𑀴𑀸	𑀴𑀺	𑀴𑀻	𑀴𑀼	𑀴𑀽	𑀴𑁂	𑀴𑁃	𑀴𑁄	𑀴𑁅
𑀶𑀁	ṟ	𑀶	𑀶𑀸	𑀶𑀺	𑀶𑀻	𑀶𑀼	𑀶𑀽	𑀶𑁂	𑀶𑁃	𑀶𑁄	𑀶𑁅
𑀷𑀁	ṉ	𑀷	𑀷𑀸	𑀷𑀺	𑀷𑀻	𑀷𑀼	𑀷𑀽	𑀷𑁂	𑀷𑁃	𑀷𑁄	𑀷𑁅

=== Pulli ===
Early inscriptions write consonants without a marker for the absent vowel. Later inscriptions add a dot (புள்ளி/𑀧𑀼𑀴𑁆𑀴𑀺, puḷḷi) above the consonant. In Unicode this corresponds to the Brahmi virama (U+11046).

== Unicode ==
Early Ashokan Brahmi was added to the Unicode Standard in October, 2010 with the release of version 6.0.

The Unicode block for Brahmi is U+11000–U+1107F. It lies within the Supplementary Multilingual Plane. There are two non-commercially available fonts that support Brahmi, namely Noto Sans Brahmi commissioned by Google, which covers almost all the characters, and Adinatha, which only covers Tamil Brahmi. Segoe UI Historic, tied in with Windows 10, also features Brahmi glyphs.

Brahmi^{[1]}^{[2]} Official Unicode Consortium code chart (PDF)
	0	1	2	3	4	5	6	7	8	9	A	B	C	D	E	F
U+1100x	𑀀	𑀁	𑀂	𑀃	𑀄	𑀅	𑀆	𑀇	𑀈	𑀉	𑀊	𑀋	𑀌	𑀍	𑀎	𑀏
U+1101x	𑀐	𑀑	𑀒	𑀓	𑀔	𑀕	𑀖	𑀗	𑀘	𑀙	𑀚	𑀛	𑀜	𑀝	𑀞	𑀟
U+1102x	𑀠	𑀡	𑀢	𑀣	𑀤	𑀥	𑀦	𑀧	𑀨	𑀩	𑀪	𑀫	𑀬	𑀭	𑀮	𑀯
U+1103x	𑀰	𑀱	𑀲	𑀳	𑀴	𑀵	𑀶	𑀷	𑀸	𑀹	𑀺	𑀻	𑀼	𑀽	𑀾	𑀿
U+1104x	𑁀	𑁁	𑁂	𑁃	𑁄	𑁅	𑁆	𑁇	𑁈	𑁉	𑁊	𑁋	𑁌	𑁍		
U+1105x			𑁒	𑁓	𑁔	𑁕	𑁖	𑁗	𑁘	𑁙	𑁚	𑁛	𑁜	𑁝	𑁞	𑁟
U+1106x	𑁠	𑁡	𑁢	𑁣	𑁤	𑁥	𑁦	𑁧	𑁨	𑁩	𑁪	𑁫	𑁬	𑁭	𑁮	𑁯
U+1107x	𑁰	𑁱	𑁲	𑁳	𑁴	𑁵										BNJ
Notes 1.As of Unicode version 18.0 2.Grey areas indicate non-assigned code points

== See also ==
- Tamil inscriptions
- Early Indian epigraphy
- Anaikoddai seal
- Vatteluttu
- Tolkāppiyam
- Tamil loanwords in Biblical Hebrew
- Tamil loanwords in other languages
- Tamil keyboard

== Cited literature ==
- Karai Rajan (2009). Archaeological Excavations at Porunthal 2009. Pondicherry University: Central Institute of Classical Tamil, Archaeological Survey of India.
- Dilip K. Chakrabarti (2006). The Oxford Companion to Indian Archaeology: The Archaeological Foundations of Ancient India, Stone Age to AD 13th Century. Department of Archaeology, University of Cambridge: Oxford University Press. ISBN 9780195673425.
- Dilp K Chakrabarti (2009). India: An Archaeological History : Palaeolithic Beginnings to Early Historic Foundations. University of Cambridge: Oxford University Press. ISBN 9780198064121.
- Lakshimikanth, L (2008), Current affairs reckoner, Tata McGraw Hill, ISBN 978-0070221666
- Leelananda Prematilleka; Kārttikēcu Intirapālā; J.E.Van Huizen-De Leeuw, eds. (1978), Senarat Paranavita Commemoration Volume, E.J. Brill, ISBN 9004054553
- Olivelle, Patrick (2006), Between the empires:Society in India 300 BCE to 400 CE, Oxford University Press, ISBN 0195305329, OCLC 230182897
- Mahadevan, Iravatham (2003), Early Tamil Epigraphy: From the Earliest Times to the Sixth Century A.D., Harvard Oriental Series vol. 62, Cambridge, Mass: Department of Sanskrit and Indian Studies, Harvard University, ISBN 0-674-01227-5
- Nagaswamy, N (1995), Roman Karur, Brahad Prakashan, OCLC 191007985, archived from the original on 20 July 2011
- Salomon, Richard (1998), Indian Epigraphy: A Guide to the Study of Inscriptions in Sanskrit, Prakrit, and the other Indo-Aryan Languages, Oxford University Press, ISBN 0195099842, OCLC 473618522
- Singh, Upinder (2008), A history of ancient and early medieval India : from the Stone Age to the 12th century, Pearson Education, ISBN 9788131711200, OCLC 213223784
- Shulman, David (2016), Tamil: A biography, Harvard University Press, ISBN 978-0-674-05992-4
- Yandell, Keith (2000), Religion and Public Culture: Encounters and Identities in Modern South India, Routledge Curzon, ISBN 0700711015
- Zvelebil, Kamil (1974), Tamil Literature, E.J. Brill Press, ISBN 9004041907, OCLC 1734772
- Zvelebil, Kamil (2002), Companion studies to the history of Tamil literature, E.J. Brill Press, ISBN 9004093656, OCLC 230182897
