= Sivagalai =

Village in Tamil Nadu, India

Sivagalai is a village in the Tuticorin district of Tamil Nadu, India. Before the separation of Tuticorin from Tirunelveli, Sivagalai came under the control of the Tirunelveli District. It is surrounded by small hamlets, including Nainarpuram, Paramboo, Pottal, Parakiramapandi, Monkottapuran, and Aavarangadu. The district capital, Tuticorin is 30 km away from the village, and Srivaikundam and Eral are 10 km and 6 km away from the village, respectively.

== History ==
Sivagalai was once called “Small Ceylon" by the British as it was surrounded by many lakes.

== Demographics ==
The Indian census of 2011 showed the population of the village to be 4,087. Hinduism is followed by majority of the population, with Christians and the Muslims making up a minority. The village has a church, the St. Trinity Church, which is surrounded by many temples.

Agriculture is the major source of income for the villagers.

== Education ==
The village has one higher secondary school, one middle school and four primary schools.

== Archaeological site ==
The archaeological site, located in Sivagalai, has yielded significant archaeological evidence challenging existing narratives about the dating of Iron Age in the world. Radiocarbon dating of iron tools at the site has been reported to date back to 3345 BCE, potentially representing one of the earliest known instances of iron technology in the world and pushing back the date of start of Iron age. Tamil inscriptions found at the site have been dated to 685 BCE, while archaeological remains include paddy samples dated to approximately 1,155 BCE. The discoveries were first brought to light by local history teacher A. Manickam and subsequently investigated by the Tamil Nadu State Department of Archaeology. Multiple international laboratories, using Accelerator Mass Spectrometry (AMS) and Optically Stimulated Luminescence (OSL) techniques, have conducted scientific dating of the artifacts.
