= Iravatham Mahadevan =

Indian epigraphist (1930–2018)

- Born: 2 October 1930; Tanjore, Madras Presidency, British India (now Thanjavur, Tamil Nadu, India)
- Died: 26 November 2018 (aged 88); Chennai, Tamil Nadu, India
- Occupation: Civil servant

Iravatham Mahadevan (2 October 1930 – 26 November 2018) was an Indian epigraphist, lawyer, and civil servant, known for his decipherment of Tamil-Brahmi inscriptions and for his expertise on the epigraphy of the Indus Valley Civilisation.

== Early life ==
Iravatham Mahadevan was born on 2 October 1930 in Thanjavur district in British India into a smartha Tamil Brahmin family. Mahadevan had his schooling in the town of Tiruchirapalli and graduated in Chemistry from the Vivekananda College, Chennai and law from the Madras Law College. Mahadevan successfully passed the Indian Administrative Service examinations held in 1953 and was allotted to the Madras cadre.

== Civil service ==
Mahadevan worked as an Assistant Collector in Coimbatore district and Sub-Collector at Pollachi. In 1958, Mahadevan was transferred to Delhi as Assistant Financial Adviser in India's Ministry of Commerce and Industry serving from 1958 to 1961. In 1961, Mahadevan was posted to Madras as Deputy Secretary in Government of Tamil Nadu's Industries Department and served as Director of Handlooms and Textiles Department from 1962 to 1966. Mahadevan voluntarily retired from the civil service in 1980.

== Tamil-Brahmi inscriptions ==
According to an interview given to an e-journal Varalaaru, Mahadevan revealed that he started researching the Tamil-Brahmi script following a casual suggestion by Indian historian K. A. Nilakanta Sastri during a meeting in 1961.

There are several caves in Tamil Nadu with inscriptions in the Brahmi script. K. V. Subrahmanya Aiyar says they are in Tamil. It is an unsolved problem. Can you give it a shot?

Earlier, during his stint in the Ministry of Commerce and Industry in Delhi in 1958–61, Mahadevan had become acquainted with the noted epigraphist and art historian C. Sivaramamurti who was then working as a curator at the Indian Museum next block. Sivaramamurti initiated him into the basics of South Indian epigraphy.

Mahadevan first published his study of Tamil-Brahmi inscriptions at Pugalur in 1965 following those of Mangulam, the next year. In the same year, Mahadevan presented his paper on Tamil-Brahmi inscriptions in Madras which was later published as the book Corpus of the Tamil-Brahmi Inscriptions. After a brief period of research with the Indus script, Mahadevan resumed his work on Tamil-Brahmi in 1992 with active support from the Tamil Nadu Archaeological Department. In 2003, he published a revised edition of the 1966 book which has since acquired the status of a classic.

== Indus script ==
Mahadevan started his research on the Indus script following a brush with W. W. Hunter's book on the Indus Script at India's Central Secretariat Library in Delhi. In 1970, Mahadevan was offered the Jawaharlal Nehru Fellowship to do his doctoral research on the Indus Script. Mahadevan continued his research even after his fellowship ended and published his first book Indus Script: Concordance and Tables in 1977. Following a break from 1991 to 2003 to complete his research on Tamil epigraphy, Mahadevan resumed his studies again in 2003.

Gregory Possehl called Mahadevan a "careful, methodical worker, taking care to spell out his assumptions and methods. ... 'Tentative conclusions' and 'working hypotheses' are more his style than set ideas and fait accompli".

== Significant contributions ==
Iravatham Mahadevan's The Indus Script: Texts, Concordance and Tables (1977) is the only openly available corpus of the Indus Script. He wrote over 40 papers to further the Dravidian hypothesis of the Indus Script and argues for a continuity between the written records of Indus and the oral transmissions from the Rig Veda. He was instrumental in firmly establishing the view of K.V. Subrahmanya Aiyer that the writings found in the caves of Tamil Nadu in a script similar to Brahmi are a variant of Brahmi, which Mahadevan calls Tamil Brahmi, and in ascertaining that the language of the script is indeed Tamil. Mahadevan went on to read the names and titles of several generations of Pandiya and Chera kings in Tamil Brahmi writings, all corroborated in early Tamil literature.

== Awards and honours ==
Iravatham Mahadevan was awarded the Jawaharlal Nehru Fellowship in 1970 for his research in Indus script and the National Fellowship of the Indian Council of Historical Research in 1992 for his work on Tamil-Brahmi inscriptions.

In 1998, he was elected the president of the Annual Congress of the Epigraphical Society of India and in 2001 he became the general president of the Indian History Congress. He received the Padma Shri award from the Government of India in 2009 for arts. He was conferred the Tolkappiyar award for lifetime achievement in classical Tamil by the Government of India for the year 2009–2010.

He was conferred the Campbell Medal by the Asiatic Society of Mumbai, formerly the Royal Asiatic Society, in November 2014.

A bronze bust of Mahadevan was created by artist G. Chandrasekaran and placed at the Roja Muthiah Research Library.

== Publications ==
- Corpus of Tamil-Brahmi inscriptions (1966)
- The Indus Script: Texts, Concordance and Tables (1977)
- Early Tamil Epigraphy: From the Earliest Times to the Sixth Century A.D. (Harvard Oriental Series, 62) (2003)
- Early Tamil Epigraphy: Tamil-Brahmi Inscriptions. Revised and Enlarged Second Edition: Volume 1 (Central Institute of Classical Tamil) (2014)
- Akam and Puram : 'Address' Signs of the Indus Script (2010)
- Dravidian Proof of the Indus Script via the Rig Veda: A Case Study (2014)
- Toponyms, Directions and Tribal Names in the Indus Script (Archaeopress) (2017)

== See also ==
- Early Indian epigraphy
