= Robert Sewell (historian) =

Robert Sewell (4 June 1845 – 30 December 1925) was a British civil servant and historian, as well as a novelist. He worked in the civil service of the Madras Presidency during the period of colonial rule in India.

== Career ==
He was Keeper of the Madras Record Office and was tasked with responsibility for documenting ancient inscriptions and remains in the region, As with other British administrators of his type at that period, his purpose was not scholarly but rather to bolster administrative control by constructing a history that placed British rule as a virtue and a necessity rather than something to be denigrated. Portrayal of historic factionalism among local figureheads and dominion by alien despots would, it was thought, enhance the perception that only the British could rescue the country from its past.

Sewell's specialism was the Vijayanagara Empire, about which he authored A Forgotten Empire Vijayanagar: A Contribution to the History of India (1900). Burton Stein described this book as Sewell's

only popular work ... [In which] an outline of the genealogical and chronological evidence on the dynasties of Vijayanagara was briefly presented followed by two long and historically configuring translations of the accounts of two sixteenth-century Portuguese visitors to the city.

Sewell undertook archaeological work, including at the Buddhist stupa at Amaravati, which had already been largely destroyed prior to his arrival. The site had previously been surveyed by Colin Mackenzie and Walter Elliot. His record-keeping at that site in 1877 has been criticised for making an already-bad situation worse, adding to the problems that meant it was impossible to correlate the finds made. According to several Indian historians, Sewell chose Vijayanagar in the title of his work because he knew Kannada and Telugu groups would fight if he called it Karnataka, although he mentioned in the body of the text that the empire was called Karnataka.

Sewell was guided by various native speakers of the Kannada, Malayalam, Sanskrit, Tamil and Telugu languages spoken there. Some of these aides went on to publish research of their own, such as S. Krishnaswami Aiyangar.
