= K. V. Subrahmanya Aiyar =

Tamil epigraphist and historian

Kanthadai Vaidya Subrahmanya Aiyar (1875 – 7 November 1969) was a Tamil epigraphist and historian. He is considered to be the first person to conclusively decipher the cave inscriptions of Tamil Nadu as a form of Tamil-Brahmi.

== Early life ==
Subrahmanya Aiyar was born in Avinashi Tirupur in 1875 and was educated in Trichinopoly. On completion of his education, Aiyar obtained a job at the Coimbatore Collectorate in Ootacamund where his abilities were recognised by Chief Epigraphist V. Venkayya who in 1906, inducted him into his team.

== Career ==
Subrahmanya Aiyar worked as a government epigraphist from 1906 to 1932. He edited South Indian Inscriptions Volumes VI, VII and VIII and wrote for the Epigraphia Indica. In 1938, he published a monumental 3-volume work Historical Sketches of Ancient Deccan.

== Works ==
- Aiyar, K. V. Subrahmanya (1917). Historical Sketches of Ancient Deccan. Modern Printing Works.
- Aiyar, K. V. Subrahmanya (1924). The Earliest monuments of the Pândya country and their inscriptions.
