= Vattappalai =

Vattapalai வற்றாப்பளை වට්ටාප්පලෛ Vatrapalai
- Suburb
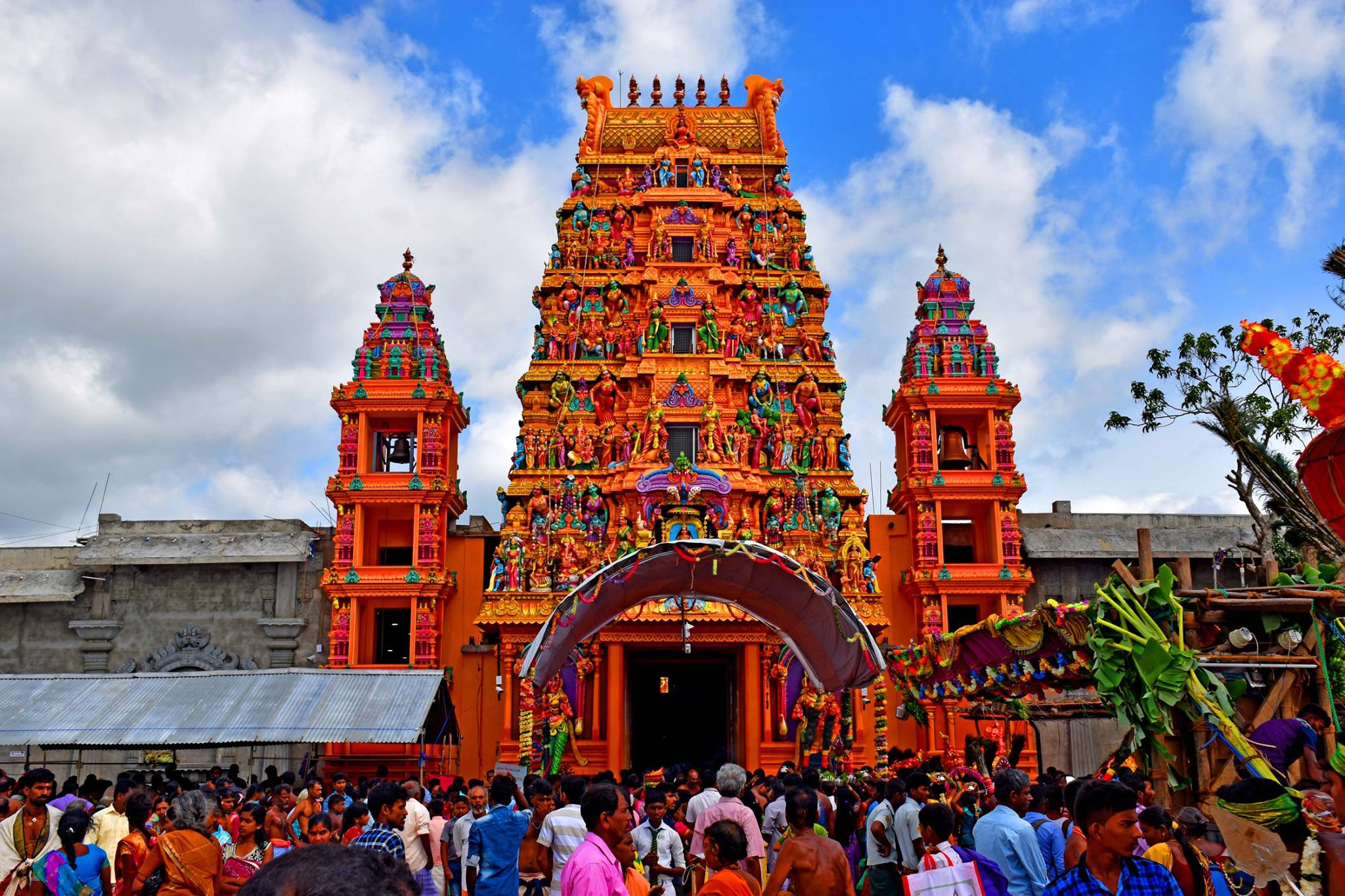
- Vattappalai Kannaki Amman Kovil; During Annual Vaikasi Pongal

- Location within Northern Province Location within Sri Lanka
- Coordinates: 9°14′57″N 80°47′31″E
- Country: Sri Lanka
- Province: Northern Province
- District: Mullaitivu
- Divisional Secretariat: Maritimepattu
- Weather: 1 =
- Named for: Kannagi's Journey

Government
  - Type: Maritimepattu Pradeshiya Sabha
  - Body: Grama Niladhari
  - GS: Rahul
- Elevation: 36.5 m (120 ft)
- Time zone: UTC+5:30 (Sri Lanka Standard Time Zone)
- Postal Code: 42000
- Area code: 021

Vattapalai (also known as Vatrapalai and officially designated as MUL/101) is a suburban area in the Mullaitivu District of Northern Sri Lanka. Distinguished by its unique character, Vattapalai stands apart from the surrounding villages that were incorporated during the town's expansion. The name "Vattapalai" is rendered in Tamil as வற்றாப்பளை (Vaṟṟāppaḷai) and in Sinhala as වට්ටාප්පලෛ (vaṭṭāppalai).

Situated 8.7 kilometers southwest of the main Mullaitivu District, Vattapalai is notable for the Temple of Kannagi, dedicated to the protagonist of Silapathikaaram, one of the five great Tamil epics. According to legend, after Kannagi burned the Pandyan capital of Madurai, she left ancient Tamilakam and arrived in Sri Lanka, with Vattapalai being the first place she landed. The site holds cultural and religious significance for both the Sinhalese and Tamil communities.

== Etymology ==
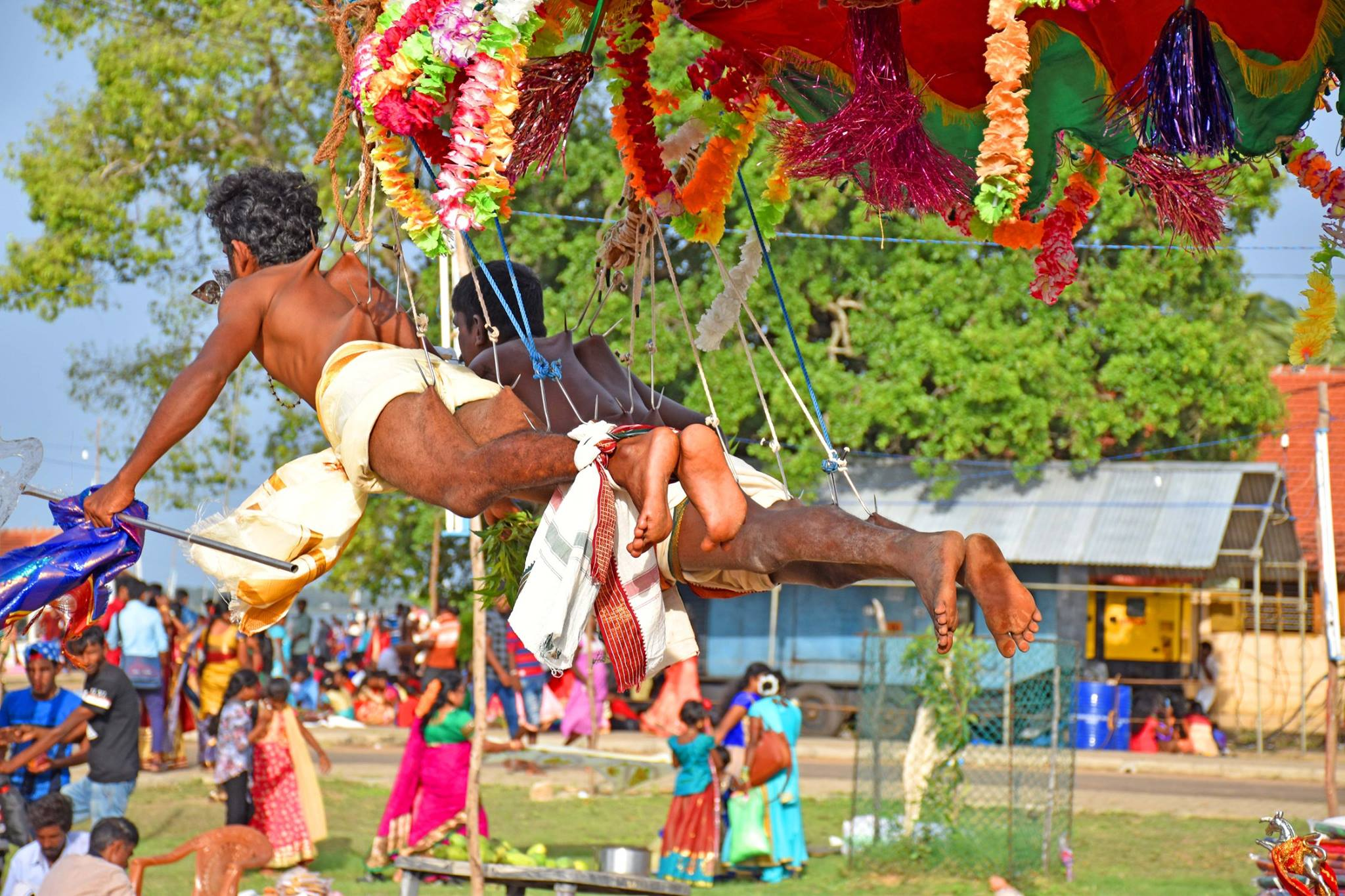
Devotees During The Annual Vaikashi Pongal

The name Vattapalai is deeply connected to the story of Kannagi. According to legend, this was the first place where Kannagi arrived in Sri Lanka after leaving ancient Tamilakam. After her departure, the perennial river near the village reportedly never dried up, which is reflected in the name "Vatrapalai," meaning "non-drying river." Another theory suggests that this location was the final and tenth place where Kannagi stayed, referred to as "Paththam Palai" (பத்தாம் பளை) or "Tenth Tent," which later evolved into "Vatrapalai." Despite these explanations, the true origin of the village's name remains a mystery, intertwined with the folklore surrounding Kannagi's story.

== Location ==
Vattapalai is a locality situated approximately 8.7 kilometers (5.4 miles) southwest of Mullaitivu town in the Mullaitivu District of northern Sri Lanka. It is characterized by its distinct geographical boundaries, with Keppapilavu to the north, the Nandikadal Lagoon to the east, Tanniyutru to the west, and Hijrapuram to the south.

== History ==
Kannagi, born in the seaport of Poompuhar during the illustrious Chola dynasty, was the cherished daughter of a merchant. Her union with Kovalan, another merchant, was a bond of joy and contentment. Yet, their serenity was marred when Kovalan succumbed to the allure of a dancer named Madhavi, leading to reckless squandering of their wealth. Seeking redemption, Kovalan returned to Kannagi, and despite his transgressions, she embraced him with forgiveness. In an endeavor to rebuild their fortunes, they embarked on a journey to the prosperous Pandiyan Empire.

However, fate dealt them a cruel hand when Kovalan was unjustly accused of stealing the Queen's anklet, a treasure secretly pilfered by a conniving minister. Denied a fair trial, Kovalan met his end through an unjust beheading. Consumed by righteous fury, Kannagi confronted the Pandiyan court, demanding justice for her beloved. With unwavering resolve, she vindicated Kovalan's innocence by shattering her own anklet, revealing the pearls within the Queen's adornment, thus exposing the true culprit.

The revelation proved too much for the Pandiyan King and Queen, whose hearts succumbed to fatal shock in the presence of Roman ambassadors and Greek merchants. Bereft of her love and consumed by grief, Kannagi unleashed her wrath upon the city of Madurai, inciting flames of vengeance for her husband's wrongful demise. As chaos reigned, she fled the scene, seeking solace in distant lands.

After her travels took her to Kerala and then Sri Lanka, she found herself grappling with hunger and fatigue. Fortunately, she stumbled upon a group of kind-hearted villagers who offered her buffalo milk pongal, a simple but nourishing meal. Grateful though she was, Kannagi still longed for the warmth of a flame to soothe her troubled spirit. Yet, in this village devoid of lamp oil, she did not despair. She revealed her mystical abilities, commanding the astonished villagers to ignite the lamp using only seawater. This display left them in awe and initiated a revered tradition that would endure for generations.

As word of her arrival spread, villagers flocked to aid her, witnessing her otherworldly grace. Amidst their hospitality, Kannagi revealed a divine secret: a thousand eyes adorning her hair, a sight both enchanting and mystifying. In a moment of transcendent mystique, she vanished into the heavens, leaving behind a stump that, when nurtured, blossomed into a neem tree, a symbol of her enduring legacy.

== Places Kannagi Visited in Sri Lanka ==
Places Visited by Kannagi in Sri Lanka

After Kannagi from Ancient Tamilakam entered the ancient Sri Lankan kingdom, she visited 20 significant places, primarily located on the east coast. After her journey, she returned to Vatrapalai, where she was taken to heaven. These 20 places are regarded as the holiest sites associated with Kannagi by both Sinhalese and Tamils. The Sinhalese honor her as Pathini Deiyo. Even many Sinhala Buddhist kings visited these temples, paid homage, and some even sang hymns in Tamil, similar to the Nayanars of Tamil Nadu. Today, despite religious and ethnic differences, she is revered as a guardian deity by both Tamils and Sinhalese.
