= Poompuhar (disambiguation) =

Poompuhar may refer to:

- Poompuhar, a town in Tamil Nadu, India
- Poompuhar Assembly constituency is a state assembly constituency in Mayiladuthurai district in Tamil Nadu, India
- Poompuhar (film), a 1964 Indian Tamil-language epic film by P. Neelakantan, based on the epic Cilappatikaram
- Poompuhar Shipping Corporation, a state-government run shipping corporation operating in Tamil Nadu, India
- Poompuhar College, a college Located in Mayiladuthurai District, Tamil Nadu, India
- Poompuhar Beach, a natural and ancient beach located in Poompuhar, Tamil Nadu, India
