= Marine Archaeological Museum, Poompuhar =

Marine Archaeological Museum in Poompuhar, Mayiladuthurai district

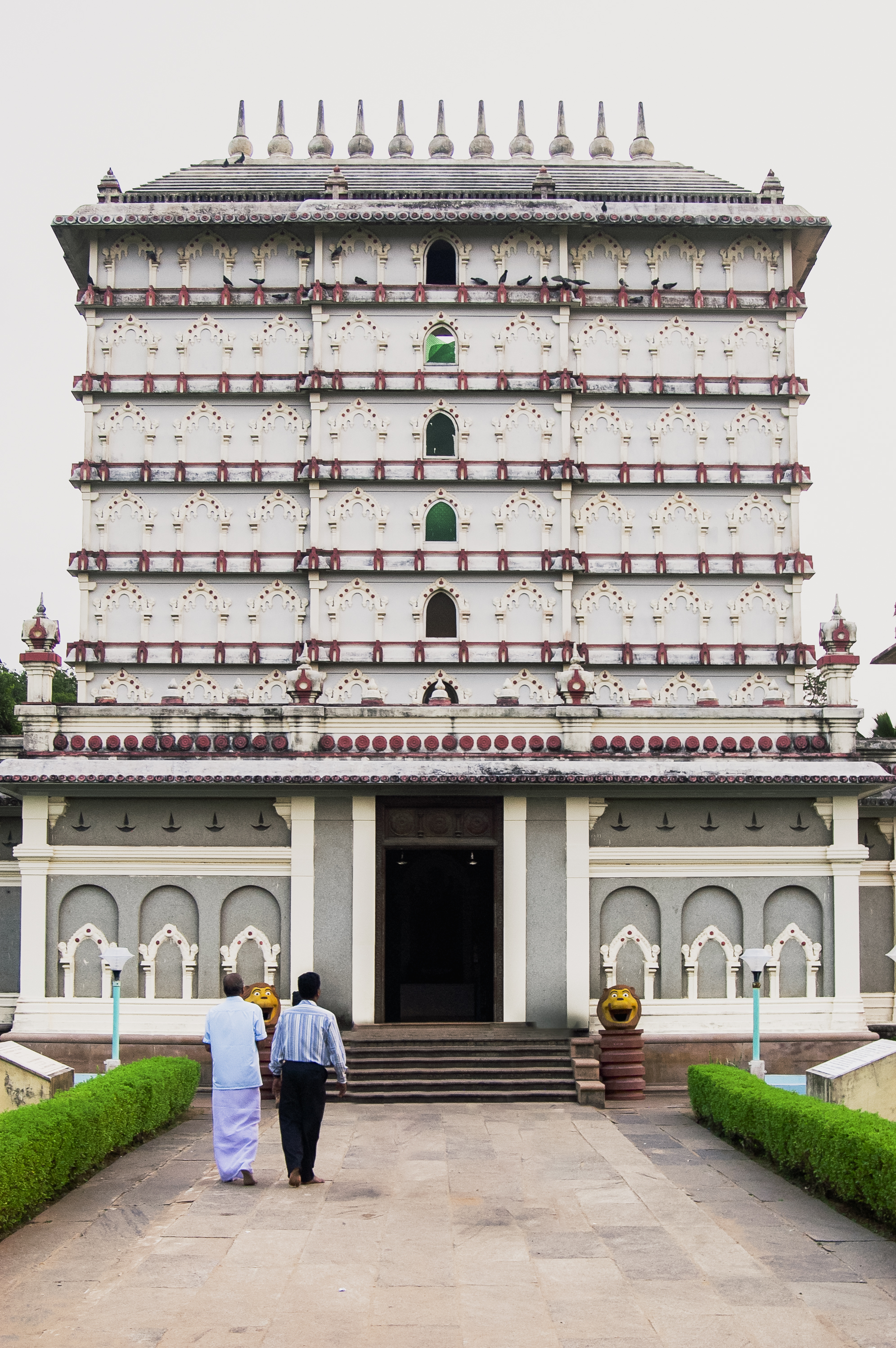
- Poompuhar Museum Art Gallery
- Former name: Puhar or Kaveripoompattinam
- Established: 1997
- Location: Poompuhar
- Coordinates: 11.143133°N 79.856016°E
- Type: Maritime museum

Maritime Archaeological Museum, Poompuhar, is a maritime archaeological site museum located at Poompuhar (erstwhile Kaverippumpattinam or Puhar) in the Mayiladuthurai district of the Indian state of Tamil Nadu on the southern side of Coromandel Coast.

== Location ==
Poompuhar is a town located at the mouth of the Cauvery River in Tamil Nadu, India. It served as a major port city during the Chola period. The town is situated approximately 24 km (15 mi) from the district headquarters, Mayiladuthurai, 21 km (13 mi) from Sirkazhi, 24 km (15 mi) from Tharangambadi, and 279 km (173 mi) from the state capital, Chennai. The nearest railway station is Mayiladuthurai Junction, and the nearest airport is Tiruchirappalli International Airport (IATA: TRZ, ICAO: VOTR).

The State Archaeological Museum is located near Poompuhar Beach.

== Displayed objects ==
Poompuhar is extensively mentioned in Sangam literature(circa 300 BCE to 300 CE), a collection of Tamil poetic works. Texts like Silappathikaram and Manimekalai provide vivid descriptions of the city's grandeur, its bustling markets, and its cultural life. The ancient city believed to have been partially submerged in the sea. In 1981, the Archaeological Survey of India conducted preliminary underwater explorations in the area. An Underwater Archaeological Site Museum was inaugurated in 1997 in Poompuhar to display artifacts recovered during these explorations. It is the only museum of its kind in India dedicated to underwater archaeology.

Artifacts have been recovered from both offshore and onshore explorations and excavations in the Poompuhar region. These include Roman rouletted pottery, terracotta figurines such as Buddha heads and Buddhapadam (Buddha footprint in English), large bricks, beads, Roman and Chinese pottery, stamped pottery from Alagankulam, wooden artifacts, ring wells, megalithic objects, Chinese jars, British-era cooling jars, silambu (anklet in english), lead ingots, Buddha statues, stone sculptures of Ayyanar, and ship models.

== Visiting hours ==
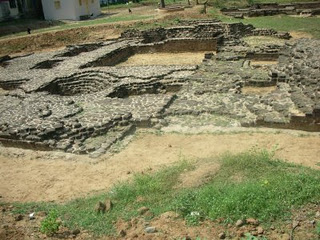
Buddisht Monastery ruins

Visitors are allowed to this museum from 10.00 a.m. to 5.00 p.m and Friday holiday.

== Future Archaeological Work ==
On 15 March 2025, the Tamil Nadu State Department of Archaeology has announced plans for a series of deep-sea archaeological excavations off the coast of Poompuhar. These excavations aim to uncover submerged structures and artifacts, shedding light on the city’s maritime trade and cultural significance during the early Chola period.

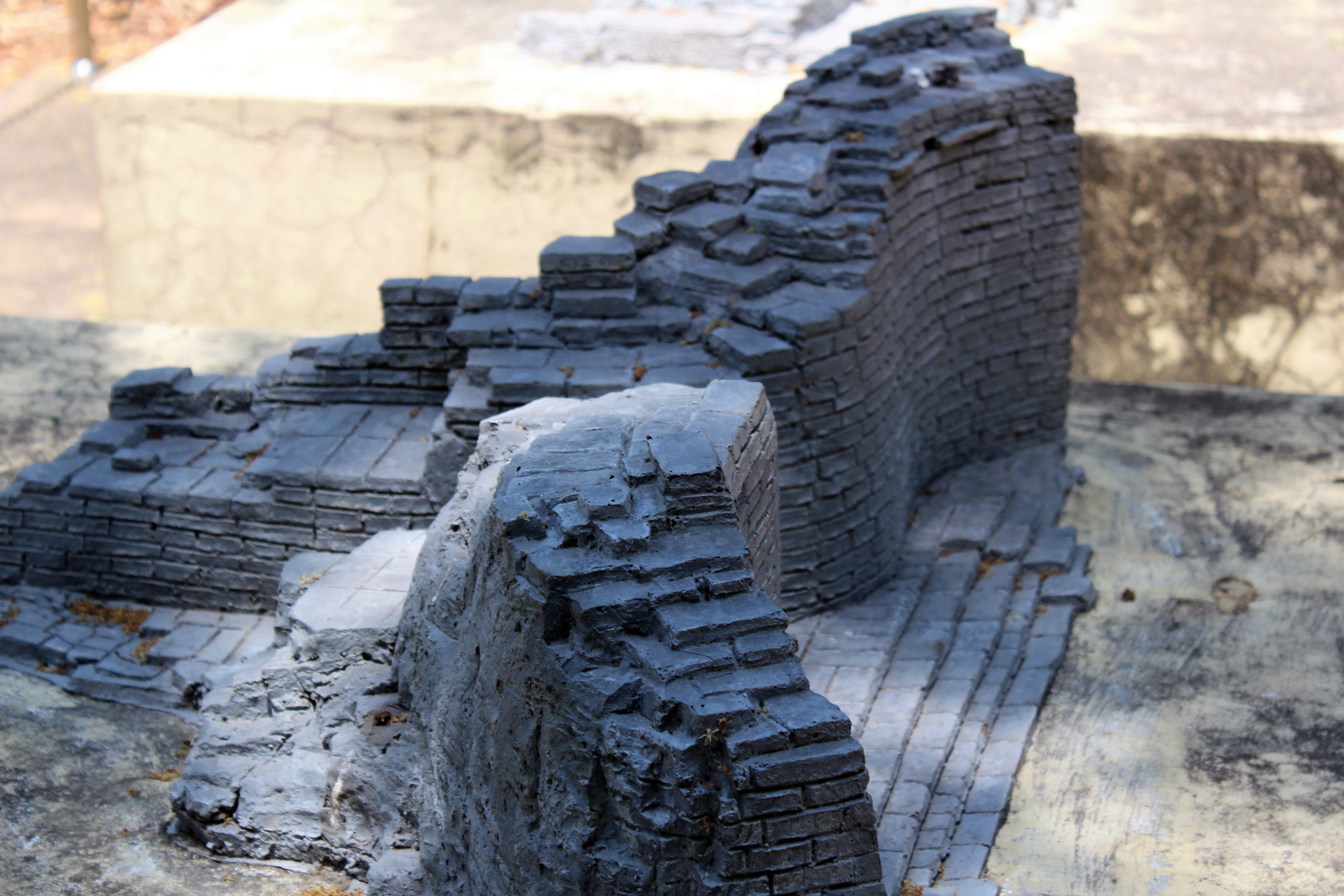
Pallavaneswaram excavations

Previous explorations, conducted in collaboration with the National Institute of Oceanography in the 1980s and 1990s, revealed man-made structures, brick formations, and artifacts dating from the 2nd century BCE to the 4th century CE. Discoveries included shipwrecks, laterite stone structures, black-and-red ware ceramics, and remnants of Dutch and British ships. Scholars expect that the upcoming excavations will provide further insights into Poompuhar’s seafaring heritage, as documented in Sangam literature and accounts of foreign travelers.
