= Vattappalai Kannaki Amman Kovil =

Vattapalai Kannagi Amman Kovil
- வற்றாப்பளை கண்ணகி அம்மன் திருக்கோவில் වට්ටාප්පලෛ පත්තිනි අම්මන් දේවස්ථානය
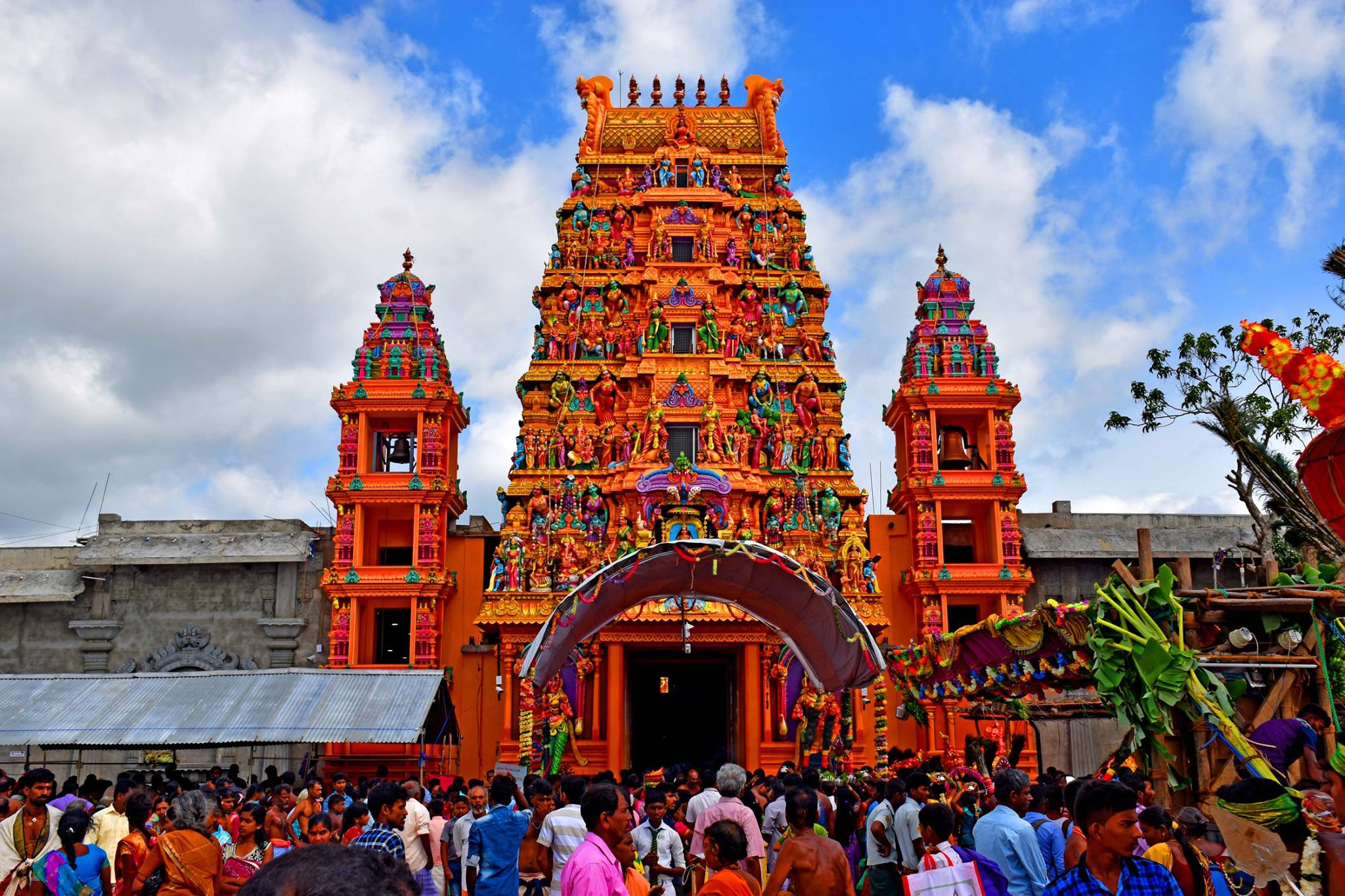
- Vattappalai Kannaki Amman Kovil; During Annual Vaikasi Pongal

- Location within Northern Province Location within Sri Lanka

Religion
- Affiliation: Hinduism
- District: Mullaitivu
- Province: Northern Province
- Deity: Kannagi / Pattini
- Festival: Vaikasi Thingal
- Governing body: Vattapalai Kannagi Amman Niruvaga Sabha; Maritimepattu Pradeshiya Sabha
- Features: Temple tank: Nanthikkadal; Temple tree: Aṉiccai

Location
- Location: Vattappalai
- Country: Sri Lanka
- Coordinates: 9°14′56″N 80°47′26″E

Architecture
- Type: Hindu Temple
- Style: Tamil Architecture
- Creator: Gajabahu I According to Rajavaliya
- Established: 1st century CE
- Direction of façade: East

Vattapalai Kannagi Amman Thirukkovil (also known as Vatrapalai Kannagi Amman Temple) is an ancient Shaivaite and Shaktism-related Hindu temple located in the Mullaitivu District of Northern Sri Lanka. The temple's folklore is connected to the later stories of Kannagi, a legendary Tamil woman who, after leaving the Pandya capital Madurai, traveled to Kerala and eventually arrived in the prosperous land of Sri Lanka. Vatrapalai is an important Kannagi pilgrimage site in Sri Lanka, second only to the Mangala Devi Kannagi Kovil in Kerala.

According to belief, Kannagi appeared in the land of Vatrapalai on the first Monday of the Tamil month of Vaikasi. To this day, an annual Pongal festival is held on this date, during which a sea water lamp is lit. Miraculously, this lamp is said to burn continuously since that time. Both Sinhalese and Tamils participate in this festival to witness the miracle each year.

== Location ==
The Vattapalai Kannagi Amman Temple is located on the shores of the Nandikadal Lagoon in the Mullaitivu District. While there is no direct railway connection from other districts to Mullaitivu, the temple is accessible by buses and other road vehicles. Situated on the main A34 road, at the intersection with the B260, the temple becomes particularly accessible during the annual Pongal festival in the month of Vaikasi, when special buses are operated by both government and private services from across the island. The temple is 8.7 km southwest of the main Mullaitivu District capital.

== History ==
According to mythology, it is believed that the goddess Kannagi arrived in Sri Lanka and stayed in twenty different locations after burning the Madurai Kingdom in anger. This event, as described in the historic epic Cilappatikaram, occurred because Kannagi did not receive justice for her husband Kovalan's wrongful execution. Historically, the final location where Kannagi stayed is widely acknowledged to be Vattappalai.

The origin story of the Vattappalai Kannaki Amman Kovil is rooted in local legend. It is said that an old woman once visited the eastern part of Vattappalai village, seeking rest after a long journey. A group of children tending cattle noticed the old woman and approached her to inquire about her well-being. The children prepared pongal, a traditional dish, and offered it to her. The old woman revealed that she was from the Chola Empire and instructed the children to worship her, especially during the festival of Vaikasi Visakham (Vaisakha), and to prepare pongal on such occasions. She then mysteriously disappeared. It was later believed that this old woman was the goddess Amman in disguise. The children spread the news throughout the village, leading the community to build the kovil, which is known today as the Vattappalai Kannaki Amman Kovil. In the 1st Century AD, Gajabahu I of Anuradhapura participated in the grand inauguration of the Mangala Devi Kannagi Temple in Kerala, India, alongside Cheran Chenguttuvan, the King of Cheralam (modern-day Kerala). He introduced the worship of Kannagi, known as Paththini in Buddhism, to Sri Lanka and expressed his desire to construct a temple dedicated to her. Upon learning about the Vatrapalai Temple, he journeyed there, and throughout his life, he visited many of the holiest sites associated with Kannagi in Sri Lanka. Following his visit, the Sinhalese also adopted the tradition of pilgrimage to the Vatrapalai Temple. During the annual Pongal festival, both Sinhalese and Tamils partake in the customary rituals, showcasing the shared cultural significance of Kannagi's legacy.

== Gajabahu I's Role in Kannagi Worship ==
According to the Sinhala text "Rajavaliya," the worship of Kannagi Amman was introduced to Sri Lanka by King Gajabahu I, who ruled Anuradhapura from AD 115 to AD 135. During his reign, Chera King Cenkuttuvan sculpted an idol of Kannagi from a stone brought from the Himalayas, established a temple, and conducted a grand festival in his capital, Vanchi, in AD 178. King Gajabahu I, invited by Cenkuttuvan, attended this festival along with the Pandya king Vetrivel Cheliyan, the Chola king Perunarkilli, the Kongu Nadu King Ilango Adigal, and the King of Magadha, as mentioned by Duraiswamy Aiyangar in his essay "Adithiravida and the Lost Sangam."

King Gajabahu I was profoundly impressed by the miracles attributed to Kannagi during the festival. He prayed fervently for Kannagi's presence and worship in his own kingdom, akin to her reverence in Senguttuvan's realm. A divine voice assured him that his wishes would be fulfilled, reinforcing Gajabahu I's devotion to Kannagi. Gajabahu I expressed his intention to propagate the worship of Kannagi in Sri Lanka to Senguttuvan, who then entrusted him with a sandalwood idol of Kannagi and a sacred anklet enclosed in a sandalwood box.

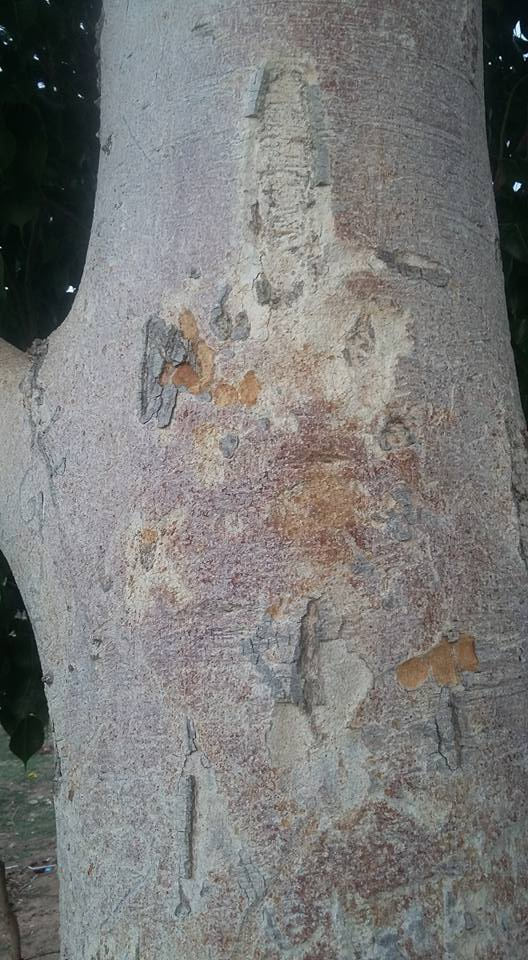
In 2017, the Sri Lankan army tried to build a Buddha stupa near a temple, but when an image of Kannagi appeared on a Bo tree there, the plan was scrapped.

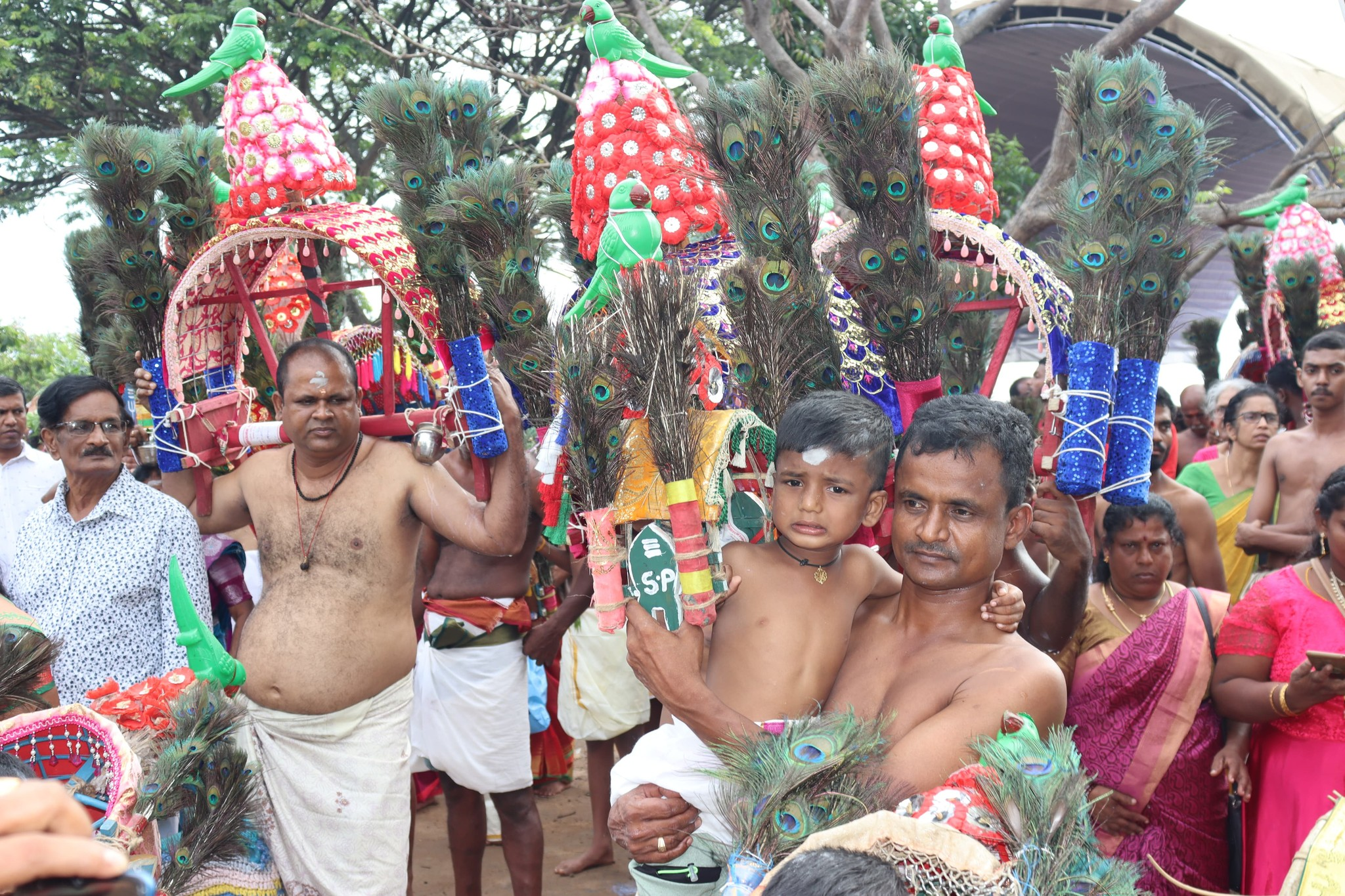
Kavadi Procession 2024 during the Annual Pongal Festival

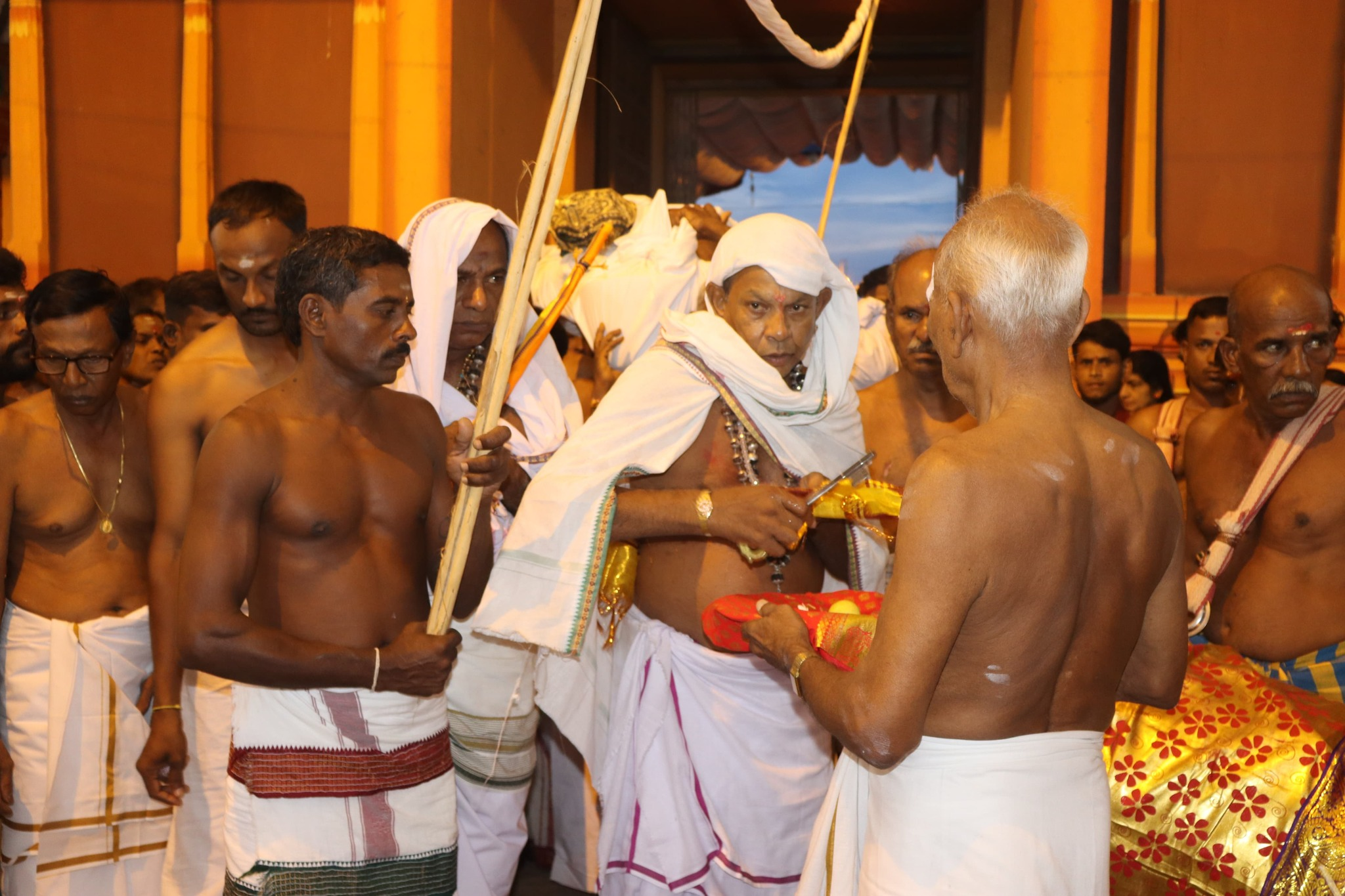
Vattappalai Poosari holding the sea water, which will later be lit as a lamp

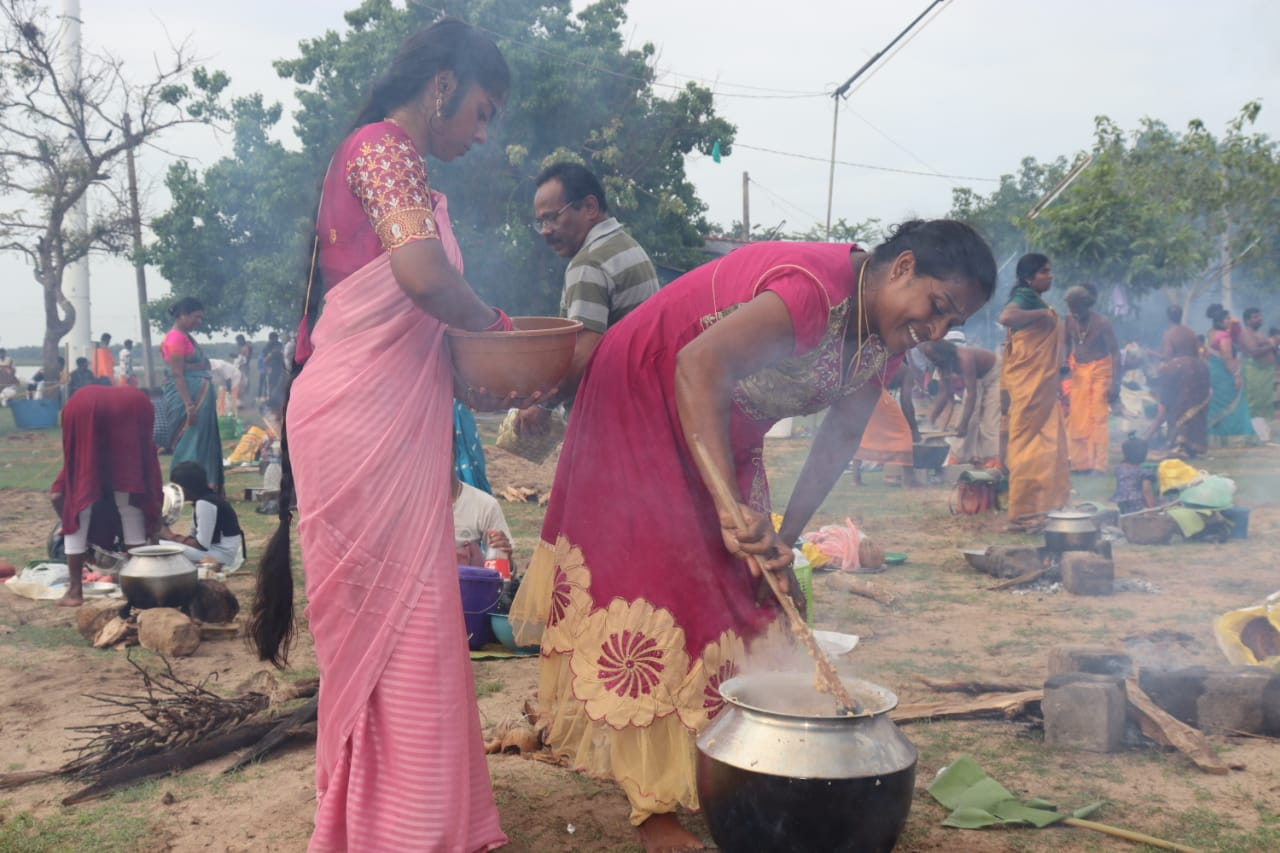
Devotees cooking Pongal on the premises of the Vatrappalai Temple.

Upon returning to Sri Lanka, Gajabahu I brought the idol of Kannagi along with over twelve thousand followers from various communities. They landed at the Jambukola port near Mathagal. The idol was placed on an elephant, and accompanied by a procession of several elephants, they journeyed through Poonakari to southern Sri Lanka. At each stop along the route, the worship of Kannagi began to spread.

The first Kannagi temple in Jaffna was established at a location known as Anganakadavai, named after Angana, a term referring to the goddess. In Sinhala, Kannagi Amman became known as Pattini Deiyo. The Vattrappalai Amman temple, located near Nandikkadal in Mullaitivu, was founded by King Gajabahu I and is considered the tenth and one of the oldest Kannagi Amman temples in Sri Lanka. The term "Palai" signifies a resting place, and "Vattrappalai" refers to the tenth resting place of Kannagi Amman. This historical transition resulted in the current name, Vattrappalai.

== Rituals ==
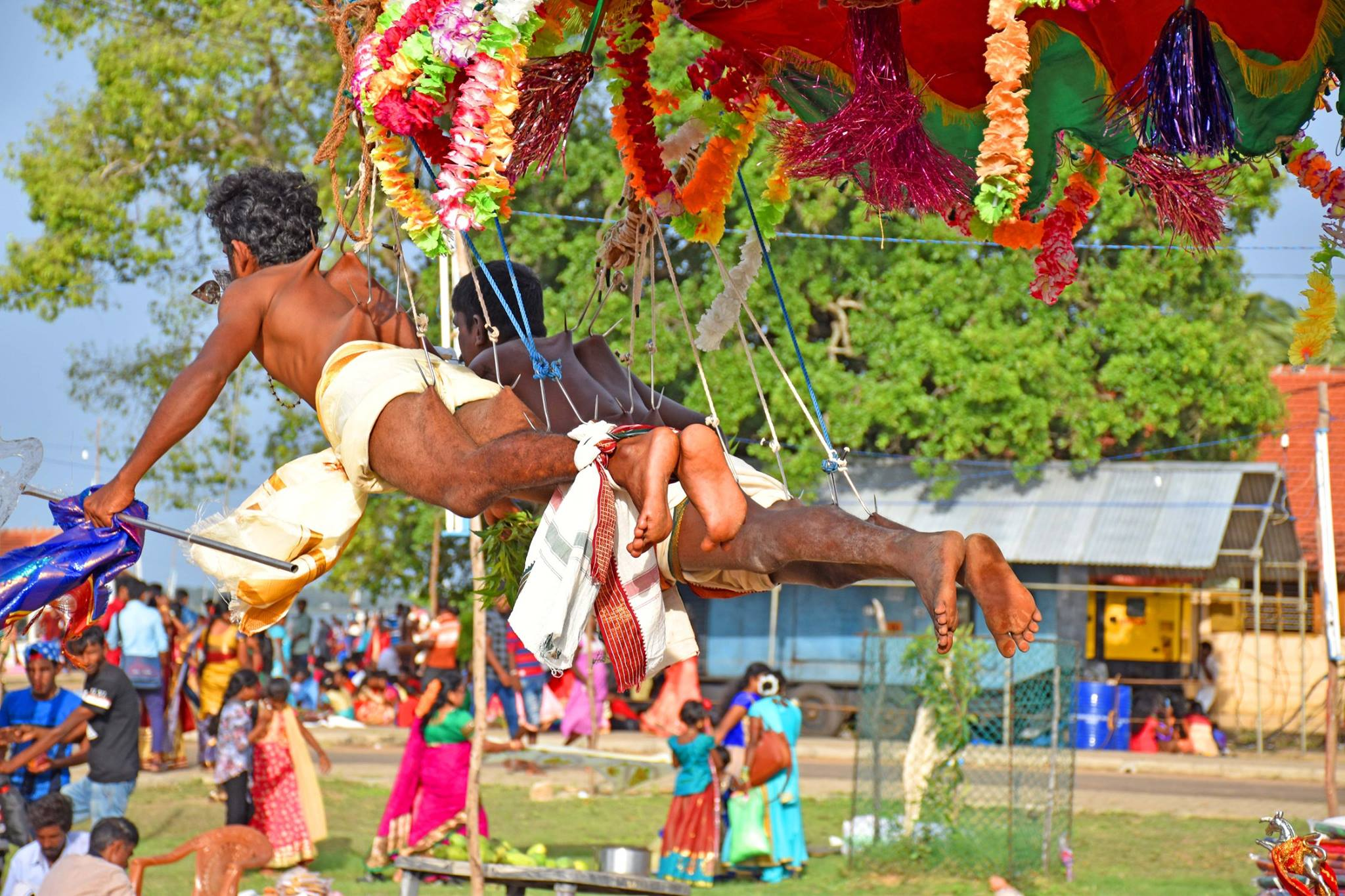
Devotees During The Annual Vaikasi Pongal

In the Tamil calendar, the month of Vaikashi heralds significant cultural festivities, typically beginning in mid-May according to the Gregorian calendar. Pongal is celebrated in Vattapalai during this period. This event holds immense importance within Tamil culture, serving as a beacon of tradition and communal unity.

The preparations for Pongal in Vattapalai unfold with planning and devotion, commencing not just on the Monday of Vaikasi but also weeks prior. The anticipation builds as communities near the Kaatu Pillaiyar temple, a sacred site steeped in historical significance and revered for its sanctity. Here, amidst the serene surroundings, a large procession takes shape, characterized by vibrant colors, traditional music, and the palpable energy of the participants.

Central to the procession's significance is the symbolic pot, meticulously balanced atop the head of a chosen individual, symbolizing abundance, fertility, and prosperity. As the procession wends its way towards the tranquil Nandikadal Lagoon, resonant chants and hymns fill the air, invoking blessings and divine grace upon the participants and their community. Along the journey, a Pusari, distinguished by their spiritual authority, leads the congregation in ancient rituals, drawing inspiration from the verses of the Silapathikaram, an epic penned by King Ilango Adigal.

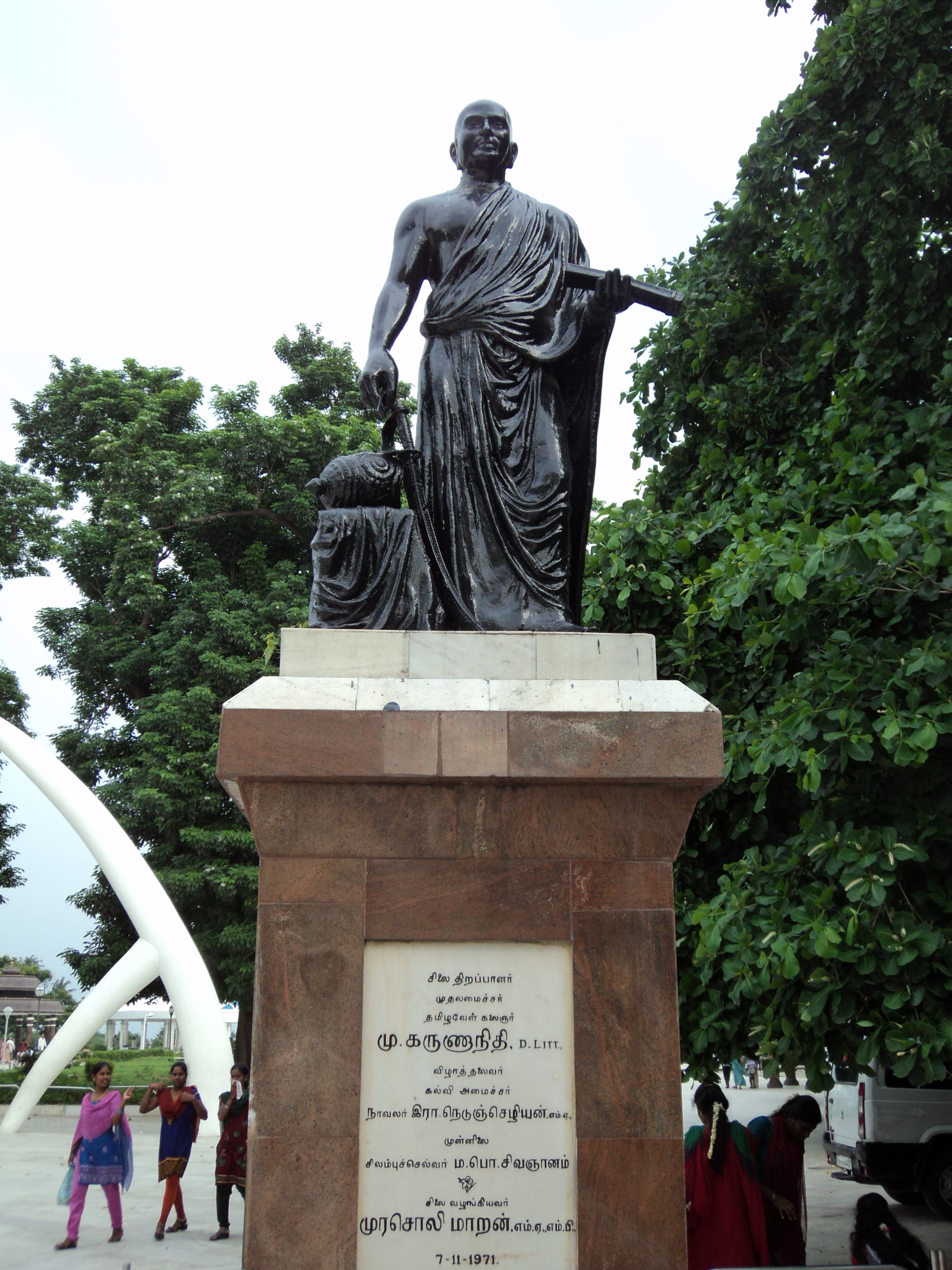
Author & King Ilango Adigal, King of Cheralam.

Upon reaching the shores of the Nandikadal Lagoon, a site steeped in myth and legend, the culmination of the procession unfolds in a series of solemn ceremonies. Here, amidst the gentle lapping of the waves, the chosen individual bearing the pot immerses both themselves and the vessel thrice in the crystalline waters, symbolizing purification, rejuvenation, and the renewal of life's blessings. Each immersion is accompanied by fervent prayers and invocations, asking blessings for the community and its inhabitants for the days and years to come.

== Miracles ==
In Vattappalai, at the Kannagi Temple, a significant ritual involves tossing rice symbolically, representing divine blessings sought by devotees. Each grain thrown skyward, avoiding contact with the ground, is believed to signify the goddess Kannagi's omnipotence.

During the Portuguese colonial era in Sri Lanka, many coastal Buddhist viharas and Hindu temples were demolished and replaced with forts and Catholic churches. One day, the Portuguese army approached the Vattappalai Kannagi Amman Temple with the intention of demolishing it. The temple priest fell at the colonel's feet and begged him not to destroy the temple. Suddenly, a heavenly voice was heard, saying, "எழுந்திரு!, நின் கையுடை பிரம்புகொண்டு அனிச்சையை அறைக, நின் அருள் சாட்சி பெறுக," which translates to English as, "Stand up, kick the scarlet pimpernel tree with the stick you hold and show them who I am."

The priest did as instructed, and the scarlet pimpernel tree began to produce fruits that struck the soldiers like piercing stones. Terrified, the soldiers begged the priest to stop, and he did. In their fear, they fled on their horses, leading to the place being named "குதிரை பாஞ்சான்", meaning "Horse Jumped." To this day, the scarlet pimpernel tree at the temple has never flowered again.

== Places Visited by Kannagi in Sri Lanka ==
Places Visited by Kannagi in Sri Lanka

After Kannagi from Ancient Tamilakam entered the ancient Sri Lankan kingdom, she visited 20 significant places, primarily located on the east coast. After her journey, she returned to Vatrapalai, where she was taken to heaven. These 20 places are regarded as the holiest sites associated with Kannagi by both Sinhalese and Tamils. The Sinhalese honor her as Pathini Deiyo. Even many Sinhala Buddhist kings visited these temples, paid homage, and some even sang hymns in Tamil, similar to the Nayanars of Tamil Nadu. Today, despite religious and ethnic differences, she is revered as a guardian deity by both Tamils and Sinhalese.
