= Poombuhar =

Neighbourhood in Mayiladuthurai district, Tamil Nadu, India

Poompuhar Kaveripoompattinam
- Town in Mayiladuthurai district
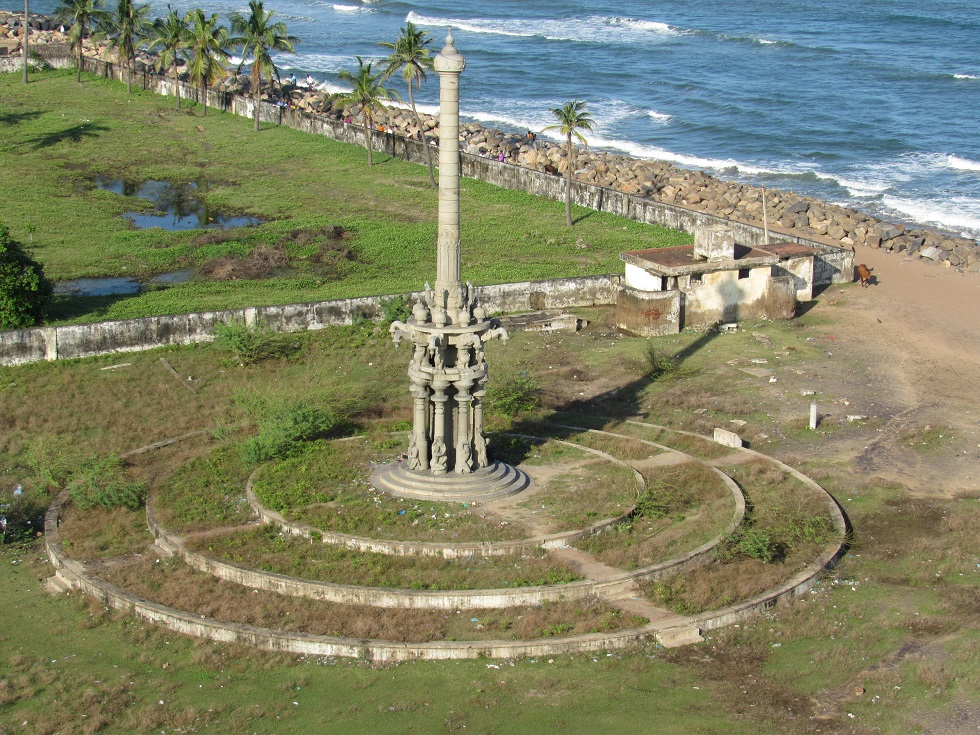

- Location within Tamil Nadu
- Coordinates: 11.144°N 79.855°E
- Country: India
- State: Tamil Nadu
- Region: Chola Nadu
- District: Mayiladuthurai district
- Elevation: 3 m (9.8 ft)

Population (2011)
  - Total: 9,500

Languages
  - Official: Tamil
- Time zone: UTC+5:30 (IST)
- PIN: 609107
- Telephone code: 04364
- Vehicle registration: TN-82-Z
- Nearest city: Mayiladuthurai, Sirkazhi
- Lok Sabha constituency: Mayiladuthurai

Poompuhar is a town in the Mayiladuthurai district in the southern Indian state of Tamil Nadu. The town, also known as Puhar, is referred to as Kaveri Poompattinam in ancient Tamil literature. It was once a flourishing ancient port city known as Kaveri poompattinam and Kaveripattanam (not to be confused with modern Kaveripattinam), which for a while served as the capital of the early Chola kings in Tamilakam, connecting South India with regions like Southeast Asia, the Roman Empire, and Greece. Kaveripattinam also served as a capital of the Kalabhra dynasty in the 5th century CE.

Poompuhar is located near the mouth of the Kaveri river, aside the Bay of Bengal coast. It is mentioned in the Periplus of the Erythraean Sea. It is now established by marine archeological research conducted by the National institute of marine archeology, Goa that much of the town was washed away by progressive erosion and floods. Submerged wharves and several meter lengths of pier walls have excavated in recent times have corroborated the literary references to Poompugar. It was rebuilt several times after that. Ancient Pottery dating back to the 4th century BCE have been discovered off shore by marine archeologists east of this town.

== History ==
Poompuhar is extensively mentioned in Sangam literature(circa 300 BCE to 300 CE), a collection of Tamil poetic works. Texts like Silappathikaram and Manimekalai provide vivid descriptions of the city's grandeur, its bustling markets, and its cultural life. The Silappathikaram, written by Ilango Adigal, describes Poompuhar as a city of immense wealth and beauty, with well-planned streets, temples, and a thriving harbor.

A Purananuru poem (poem 30) says that big ships entered the port of Puhar without slacking sail, and poured out onto the beach precious merchandise brought from overseas. In the extensive markets of Puhar there were many tall mansions surrounded by platforms reached by high ladders. These mansions had many apartments and were provided with doorways, great and small, and with wide hallways and corridors (Pattinappaalai – II –142-158). In all parts of the town there were flags flying of various kinds and shapes.

Pattinappaalai, a poem that describes the ancient Puhar very vividly, was written by the poet Kadiyalur Uruthirangannanaar is part of the Ten Idylls anthology and was sung in praise of Karikala Chola, a second-century Chola king. The poem also said Karikala chola has no enemies that he left his capital puhar with sword and proceeded his rule north up to Himalayas.

King Kanthan, one of the Kings of the First Order, is also claimed to have created the township of Kaveripoompattinam.

Located at the mouth of the Kaveri River, Poompuhar served as a major port city at the Chola era, with archaeological excavations revealing submerged wharves and pier walls that confirm its historical significance.

Poompuhar was a thriving center of trade, with merchandise arriving from overseas, supported by tall mansions and warehouses that underscored its commercial prosperity.

=== Merchants of Puhar ===
Pattinappaalai also gives an idealised description of the merchants plying their trade in Puhar (Pattinappaalai – II –199-212):

They shunned murder, and put aside theft, pleased the gods by fire offerings,…they regarded others rights as scrupulously as their own, they took nothing more than was due to them and never gave less than was due from them. Trading thus in many articles of merchandise, they enjoyed an ancient heritage of prosperity and lived in close proximity to one another.

=== In Buddhist literature ===
The Kalabhras captured Thondaimandalam from the Pallavas during the 3rd and 4th centuries CE and subsequently expanded southward into Chola Nadu. They came to control much of Tamilakam, with Kaveripattinam serving as one of their capitals. Early Chola texts mention Achyuta Vikranta of the Kalabhras, who ruled the Chola country from Kaveripumpattinam and followed Buddhism. During the Kalabhra period, Jainism and Buddhism gained influence in Tamilakam.

Buddhadatta, the 5th century writer who lived during the reign of Accutavikkante vividly describes the capital Kaveripattinam in his manuals (Pali language) as follows:

In the lovely Kaveripattana crowded with hordes of men and women from pure families endowed with all the requisites of a town with crystal clear water flowing in the river, filled with all kinds of precious stones, possessed of many kinds of bazaars, beautified by many gardens, in a beautiful and pleasant vihara built by Kanhadasa, adorned with a mansion as high as the Kailasa, and having different kinds of beautiful entrance-towers on the outer wall, I lived in an old mansion there and wrote this work.

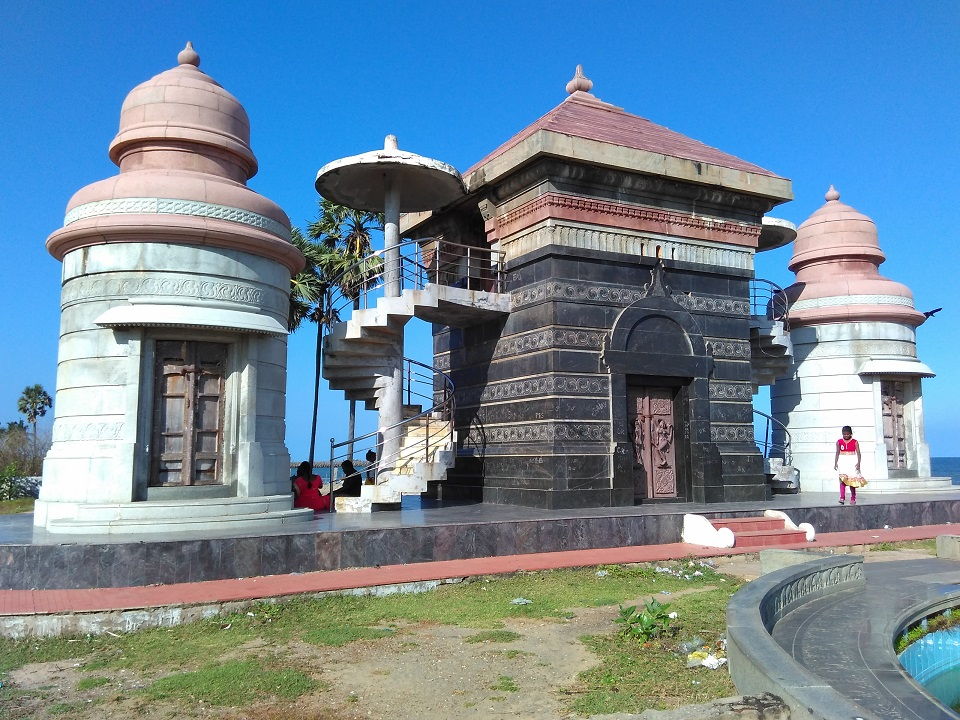
Poompuhar monument at beach

In the Nigamanagātha of Vinayavinicchaya, Buddhatta describes how he wrote the work while staying at the monastery built by one Venhudassa (Vishnudasa) on the banks of the Kaveri in a town called Bhootamangalam near Kaveripattinam.

=== City's destruction ===
The ancient city of Puhar was destroyed by the sea around 300 BC. Marine archeologists from the National Institute of Oceanography have established that this could have been the effects of sediment erosion and periodic tsunamis. Such a tsunami is mentioned in the Tamil poem Manimekhalai (see below), which relates that the town Kāveripattinam or Puhār was swallowed up by the sea. This event is supported by archeological finds of submerged ruins off the coast of modern Poompuhar. The town of Kāveripattinam is believed to have disappeared around 300 BC due to this tsunami

Today, Poompuhar falls within the Mayiladuthurai district and is part of the Sirkazhi assembly constituency in Tamil Nadu.

== City layout ==
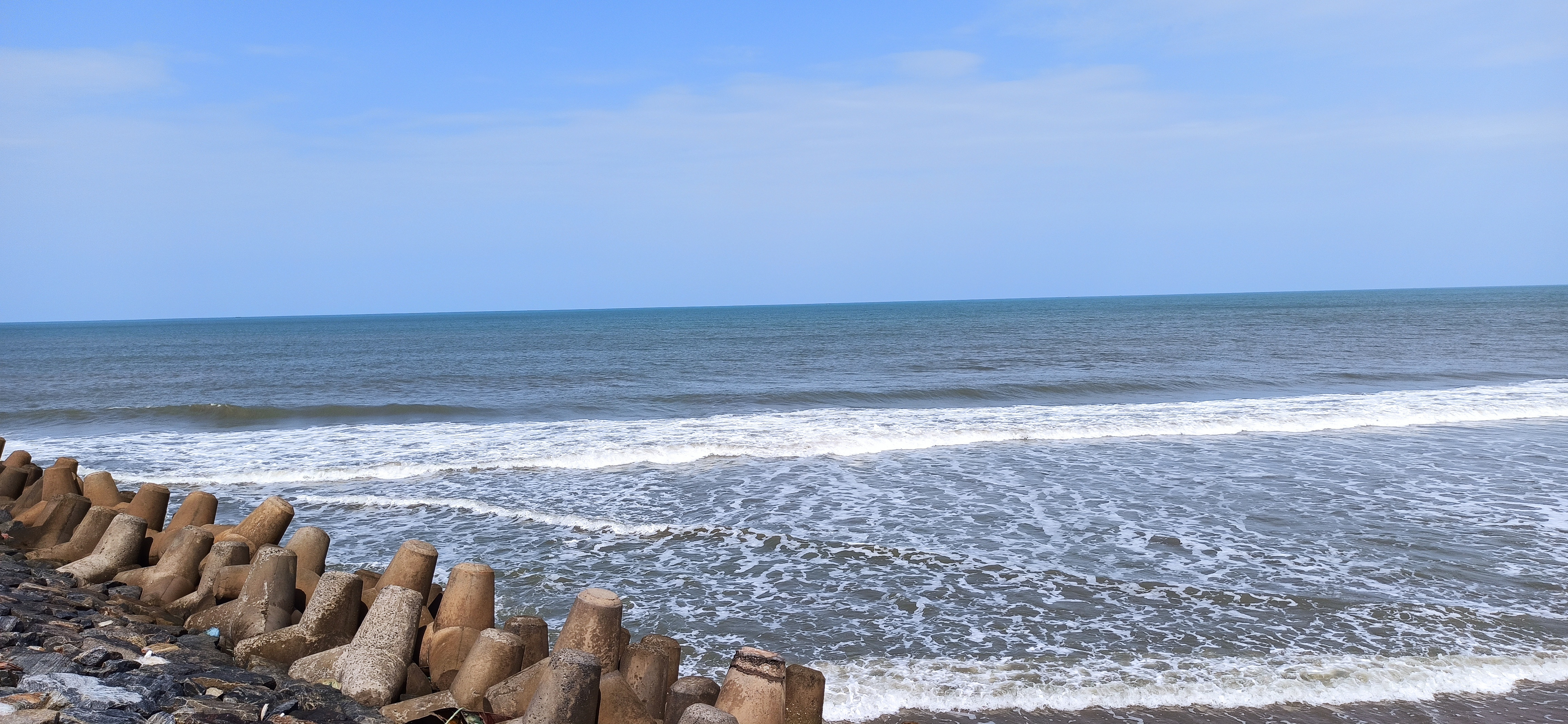
Poompuhar beach

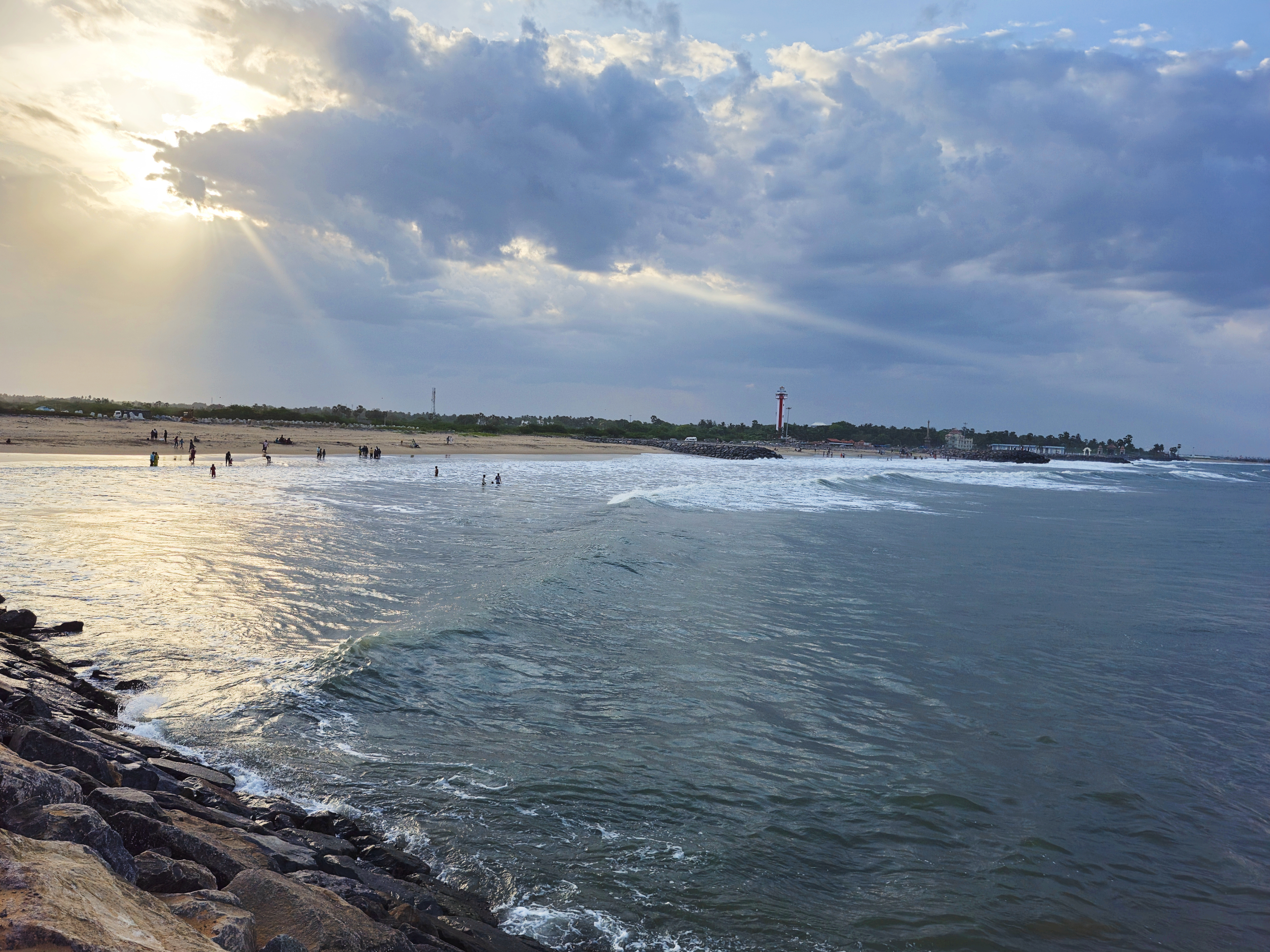
Poompuhar Beach with lighthouse

The general plan of the city of Puhar is described in considerable detail in the fifth book of Silapathikaram (c. ). The town was built on the north banks of the river Kaveri. The river Kaveri finally reaches the Bay of Bengal at Poompuhar. The town had two distinct districts, Maruvurpakkam near the sea and Pattinappakkam to its west. These two villages were separated by a stretch of gardens and orchards where daily markets were held under the shades of the trees. The market place was known as Naalangadi during the day and as allangadi by night.

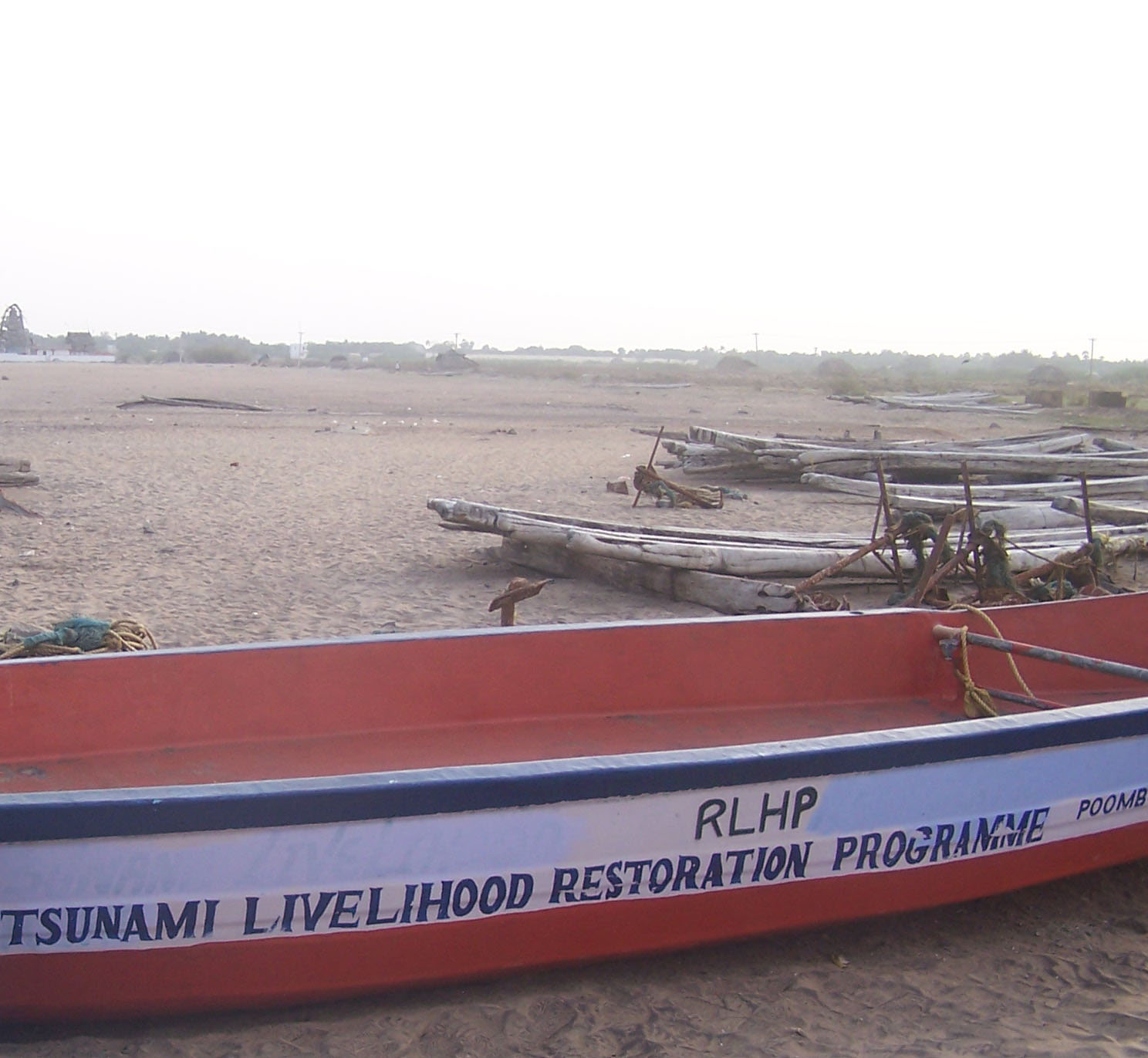
After 2004 Tsunami

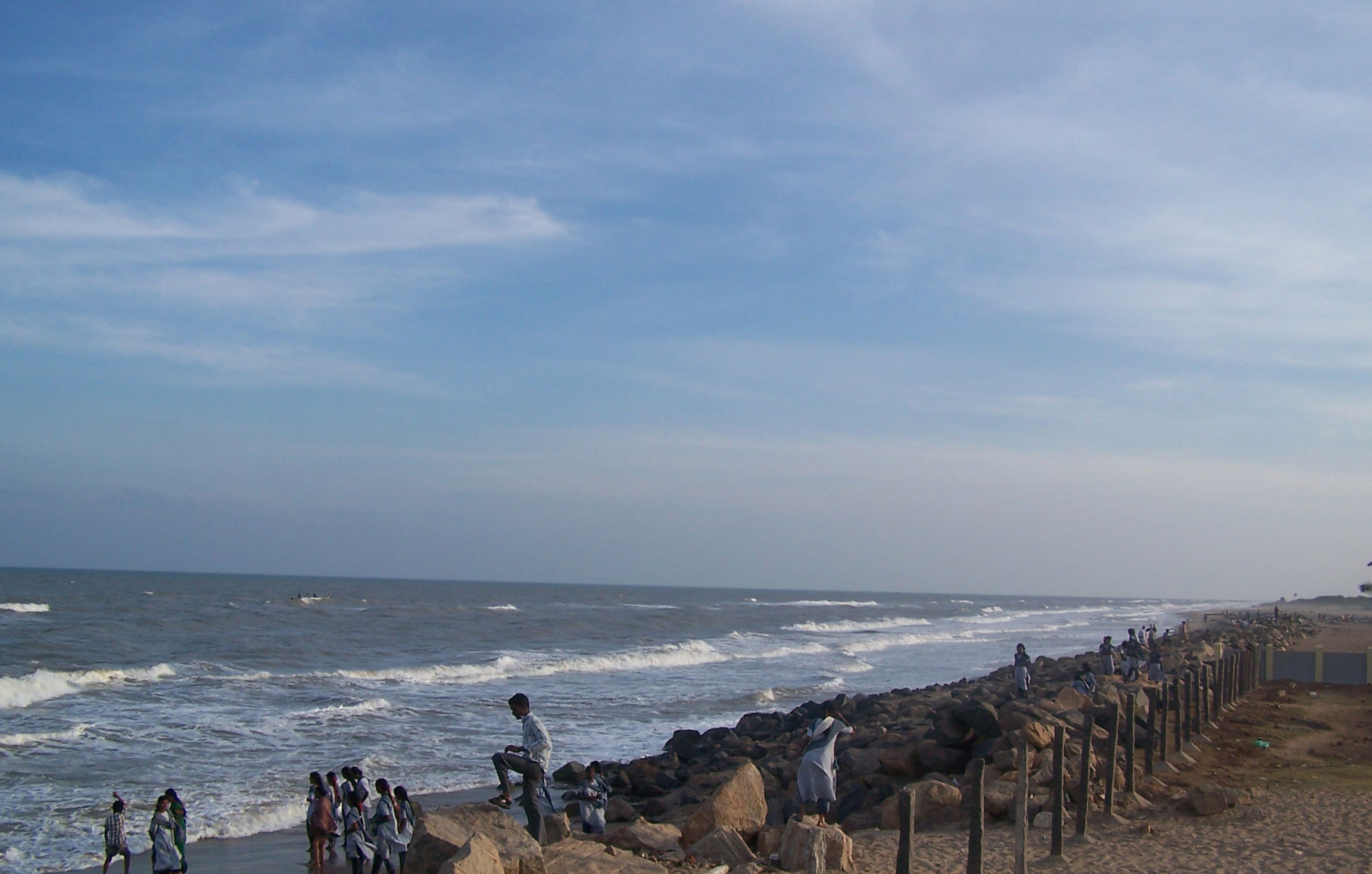
Poompuhar Beach

=== Maruvurpakkam ===
The district of Maruvurpakkam was near the beach and had several terraced mansions and warehoused with windows shaped like the eyes of the deer. Maruvurpakkam being close to the shore and hence to the shipyard was naturally preferred by the many overseas travellers, merchants and yavanas (foreigner) whose pleasant features arrested the eyes of the spectators living close to each other.

Maruvurpakkam was inhabited by the fisher folk. The town had several warehouses. Weavers, silk merchants, vendors, fish and meat sellers, potters, grain merchants, jewellers and diamond makers lived in Maruvurppakkam.

=== Pattinappakkam ===
The King and nobles, rich traders, physicians, astrologers, members of the king's army, court dancers occupied Pattinappakkam. The five Manrams - Vellidai Manram, Elanchi Manram, Nedankal manram, Poothachathukkam and Pavaimanram were located in Pattinappakkam. Gardens like Elavanthikaicholai, Uyyanam, Chanpathivanam, Uvavanam, and Kaveravanam added beauty to the town.

== In culture ==
The city of Poompuhar is a very ancient one. Legends relate how great Muchukunda Chola of Chola lineage once led his troops to guard the kingdom of Lord Indra namely Amaravathi in battle against some powerful demons who were in possession of very destructive weapons. The Chola King and his soldiers held guard without sleeping for 3600 years and as a matter of gratitude Lord Indra, King of Devas, ordered his chief engineer Viswakarma to build the city on the same lines of Amaravati. He also presented the Chola King with the Sivalingam that he personally worshipped. The great Tamil work Silappathikaram says that in Puhar ships creaked in with wealth from all 7 continents, that Devas in guise of humans came and worshipped in its temples and that the nights were so bright that even a small grain of white lentil dropped in the beach sand could be spotted by naked eye.

== Manimekalai ==
The ancient Tamil poem Manimekalai by the poet Seethalai Saathanar is set in the town of Kaveripattanam. Ancient ruins of a 4th-5th-century Buddhist monastery, a Buddha statue, and a Buddhapada (footprint of the Buddha) were found in another section of the ancient city, now at Pallavanesvaram.

== Geography ==
Kaveripattanam is located at 11°08′21″N 79°50′57″E. It has an average elevation of 1 m (3.3 ft).

== Politics ==
Poompuhar assembly constituency is part of Mayiladuthurai (Lok Sabha constituency).

== Education ==
- Srinivasa Higher Secondary School, Melaiyur
- Poompuhar College

== Tourism ==
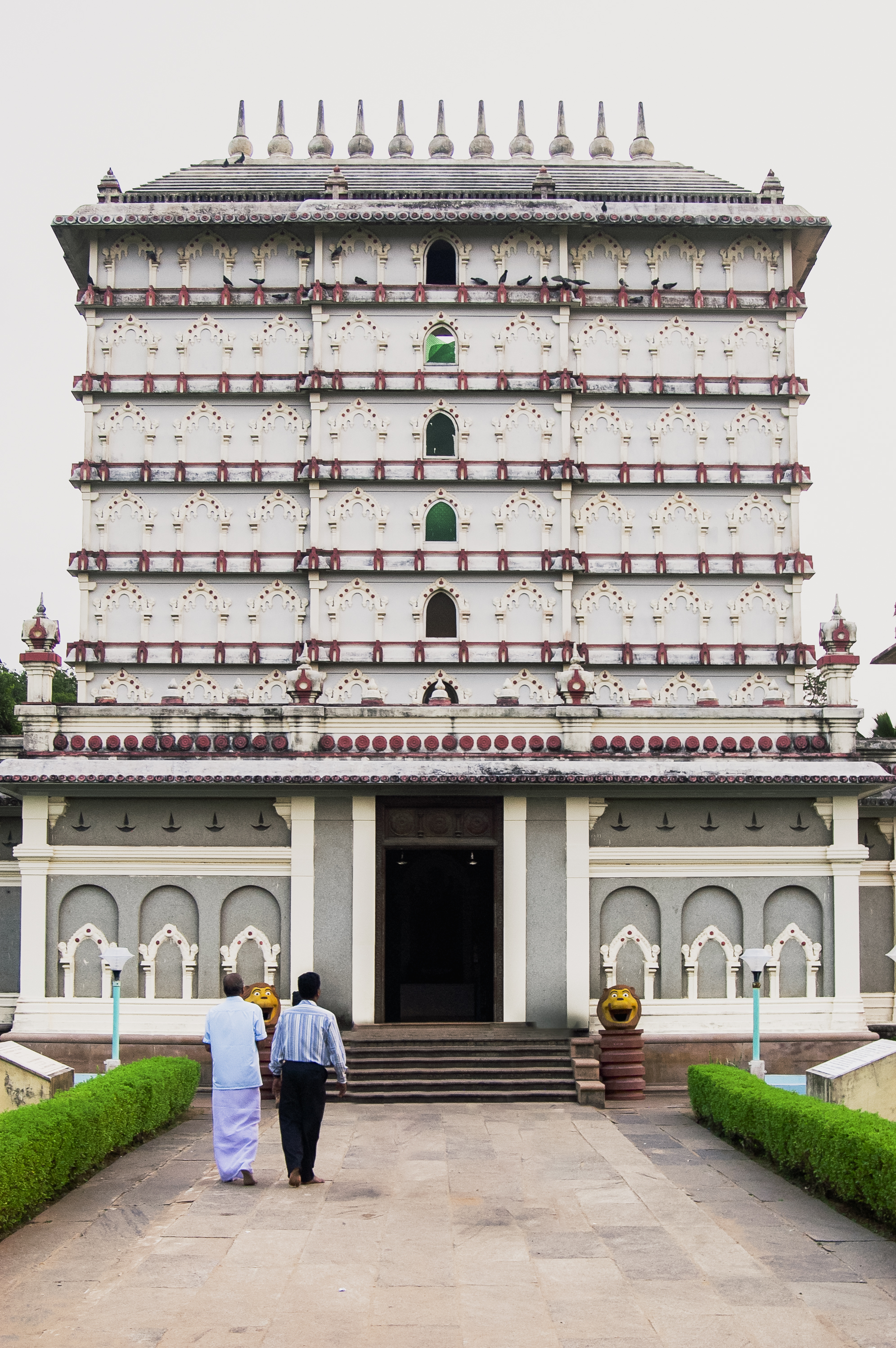
Sillapathikaram Art Gallery in Poombuhar, Tamil Nadu

The major tourists attractions in Poompuhar:

=== Silappathikara Art Gallery ===
The Sillappathikara Art Gallery is a sculptural building featuring scenes from Silappathikaram, an epic of Tamil literature, carved in stone on its walls. The sculptures were created by sculptors from Mamallapuram Art College and form a collection representing aspects of Tamil culture.

=== Masilamani Nathar Koil ===
Though heavily eroded by the sea in a number of places, this temple built in 1305 by Maravarma Kulasekara Pandiyan, still manages to impress all the tourists to Poompuhar with its architectural richness.

=== Beach ===
Poompuhar beach is a natural and ancient beach located at the site of an old port city that existed as early as the first century. The beach holds an important place in South Indian history. In the present day, granite stones have been placed along the shore to prevent erosion. Chitra Pournami is an important festival celebrated at this beach during the full moon in the Tamil month of Chithirai.

=== Marine ===
The Underwater Archaeological Site Museum in Poompuhar displays antiquities recovered from offshore and onshore explorations and excavations conducted in 1981. It is currently the only museum of its kind in India.

The third phase of underwater exploration off the Poompuhar coast was conducted from 6 to 22 September 2026 over an area of nearly two square kilometres. Archaeologists recovered a fragment of a torpedo jar, more than 250 ceramic fragments including glazed ware, limestone bases of idols, and four ancient ring wells. V. P. Yathees Kumar, Joint Director (in-charge) of the Tamil Nadu State Department of Archaeology, said that this was the first torpedo-jar fragment found during underwater exploration off Poompuhar. The fragment was considered to have originated in West Asia; torpedo jars are tubular vessels that were generally used to transport liquids such as wine or oil by ship. The ring wells, measuring about 60–65 cm in diameter, were considered possible evidence of a palaeochannel at the site. The archaeology department described the findings as preliminary and stated that only about 10% of the underwater area had been explored, with further exploration planned from January 2027.

== Gallery ==
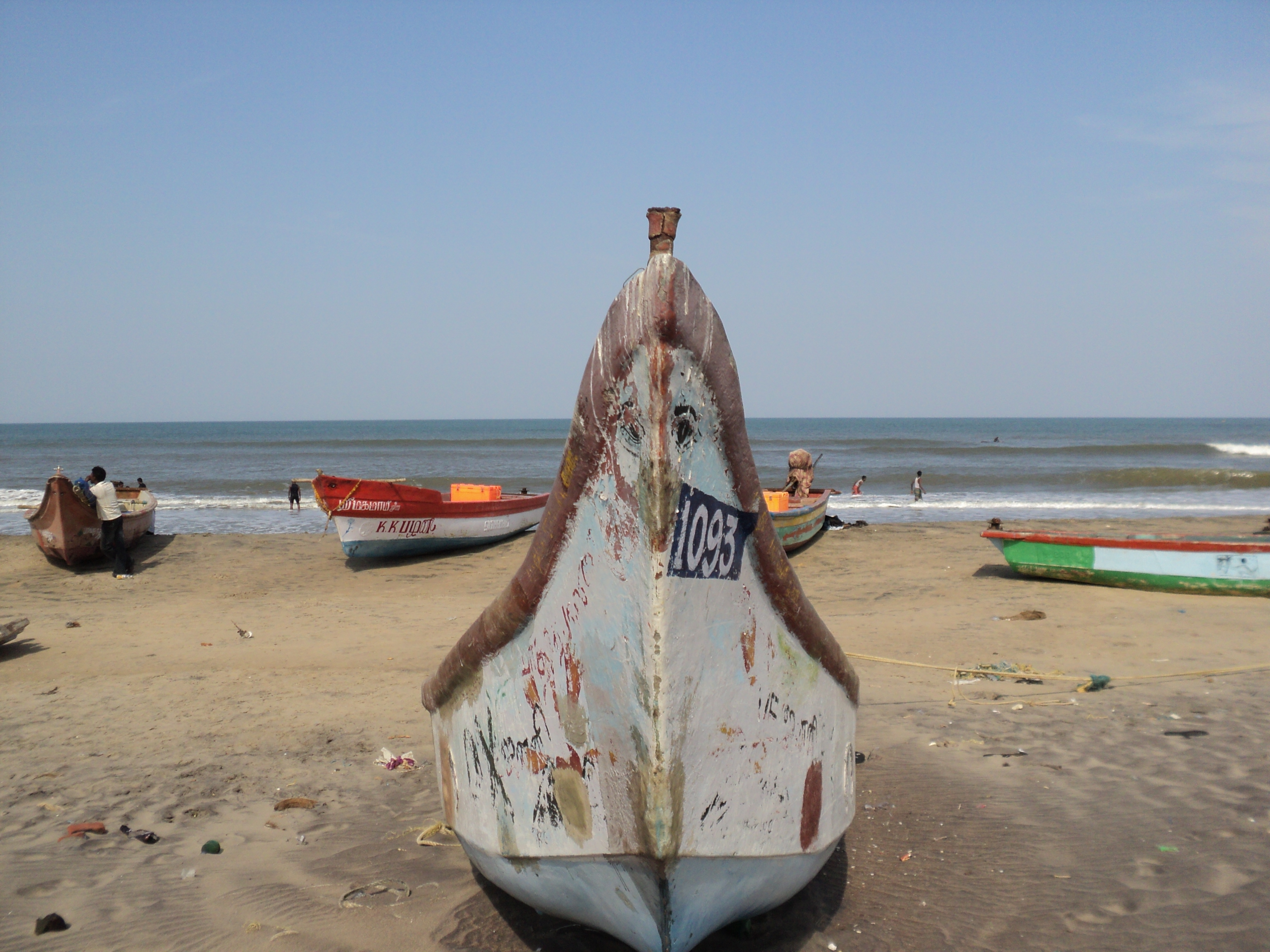
Fishermen's vessels

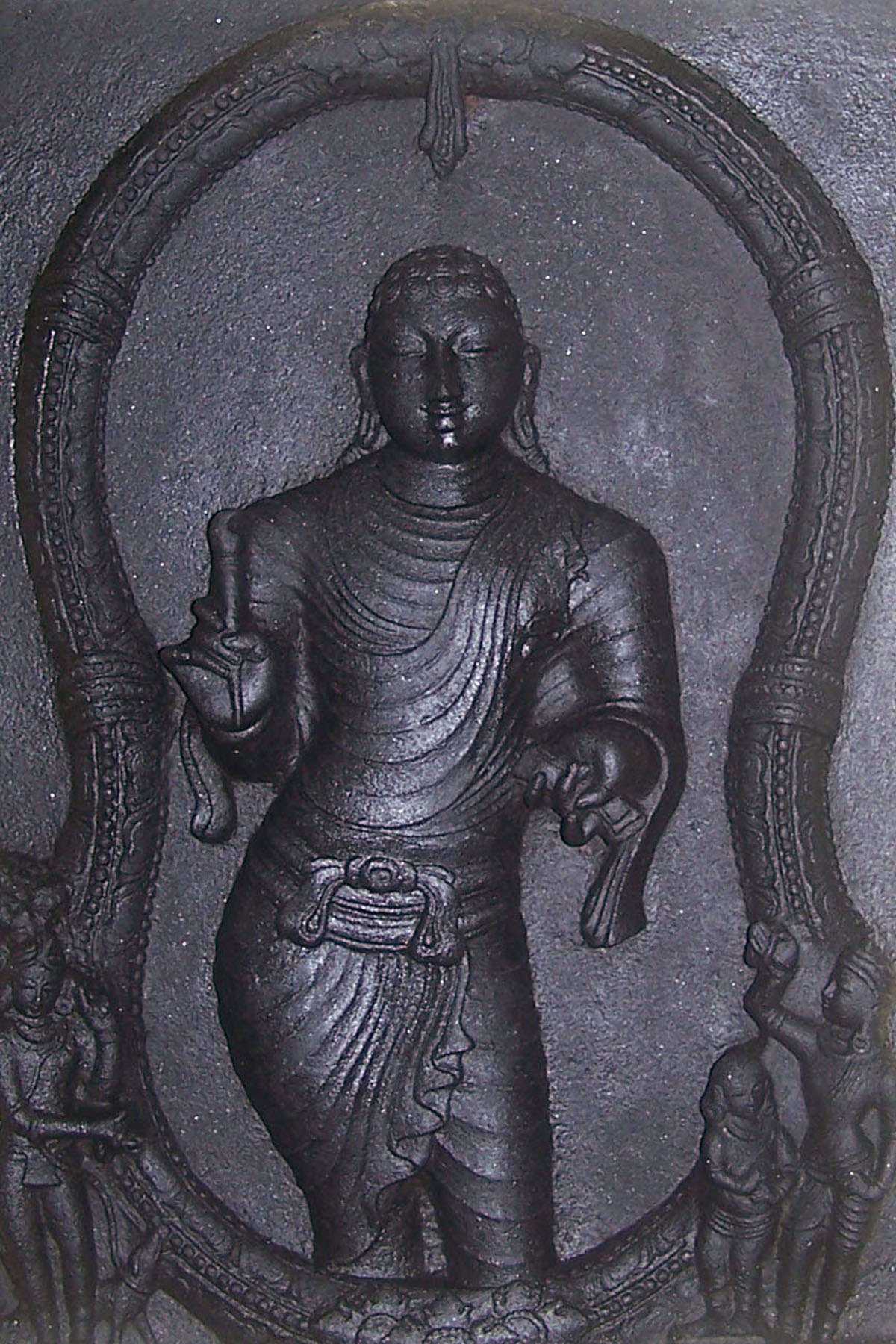
Ilango Adigal (poet prince)

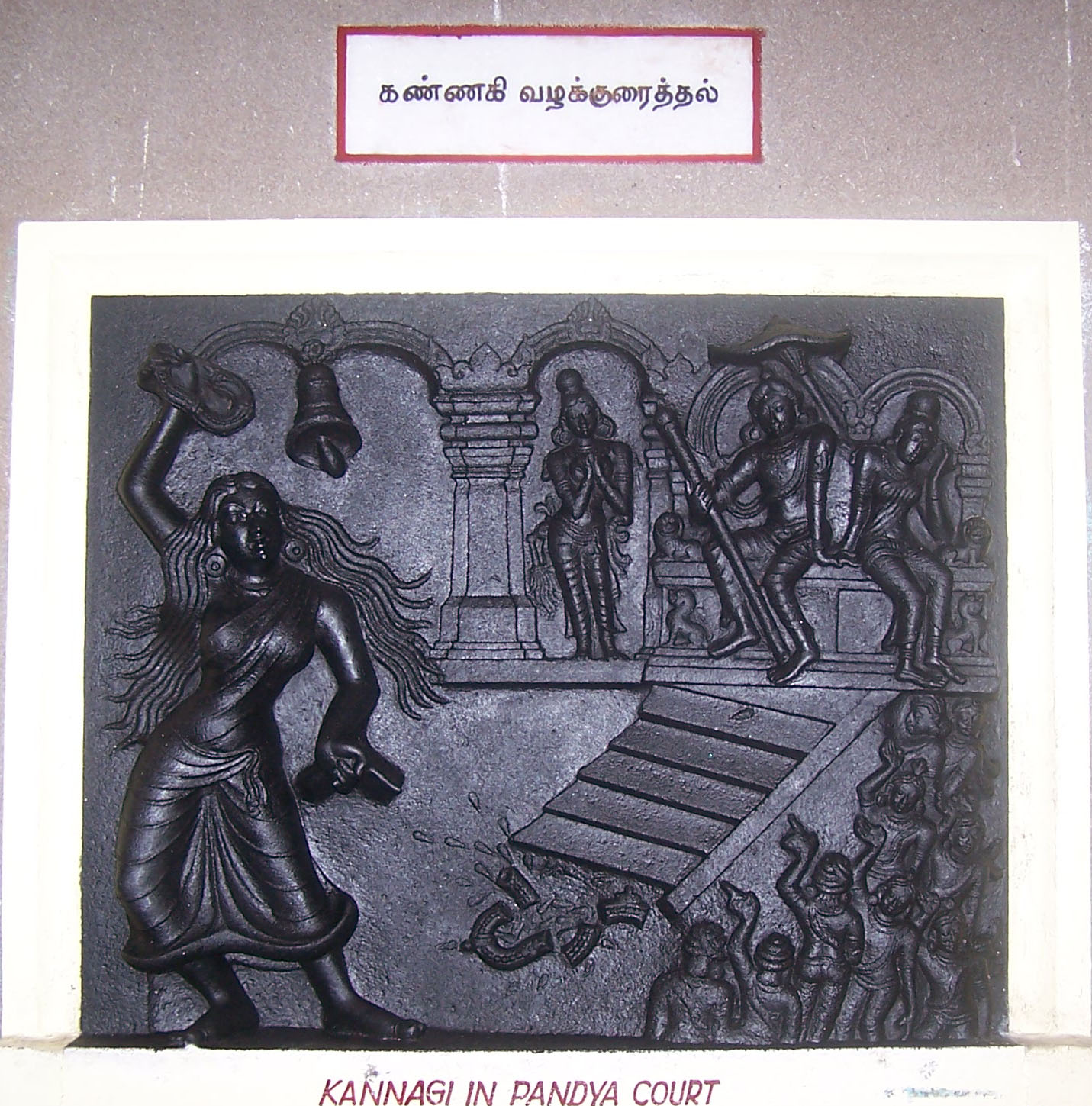
Kannagi In Pandya Court

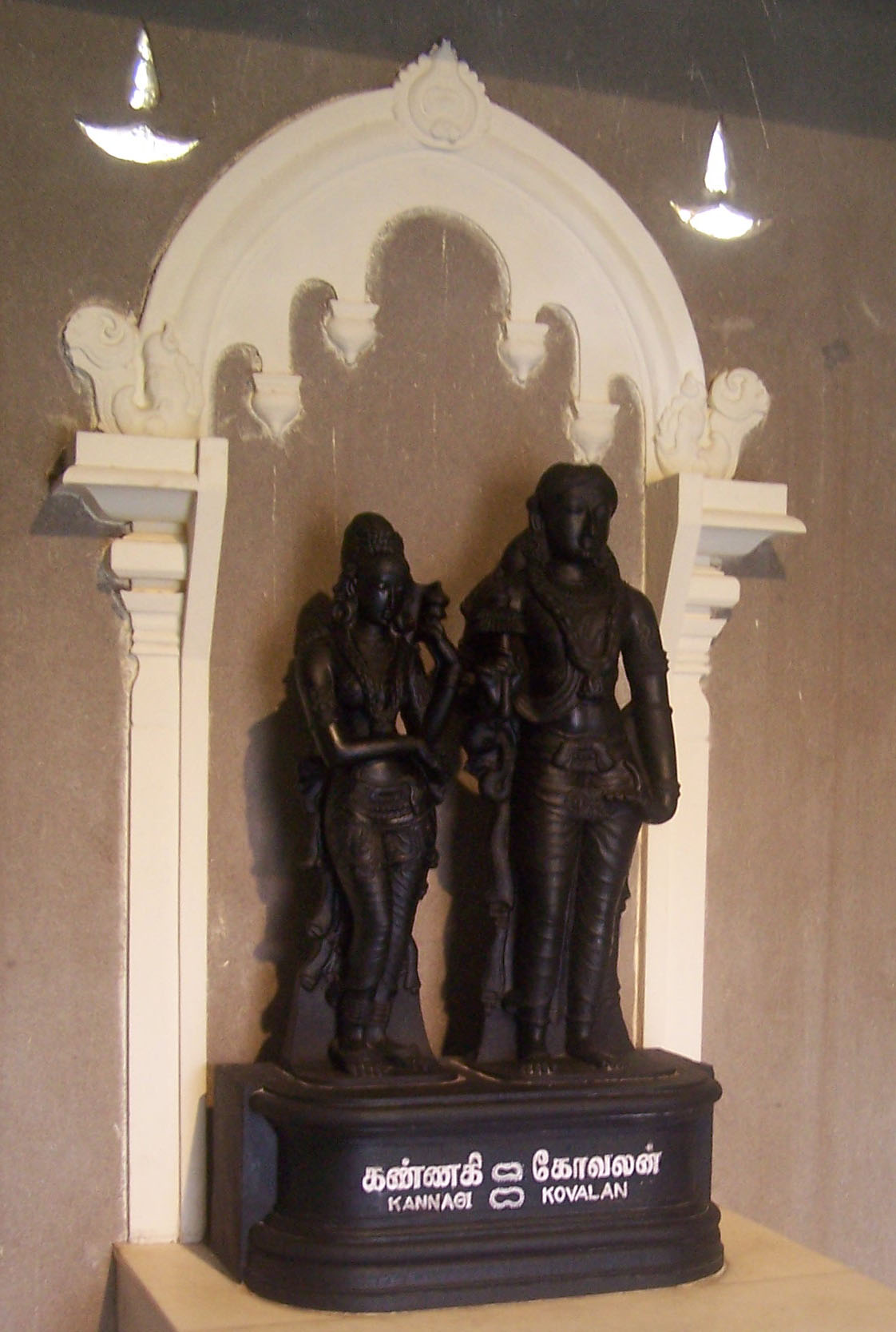
Sculpture of Kovalan and Kannagi at the art gallery entrance

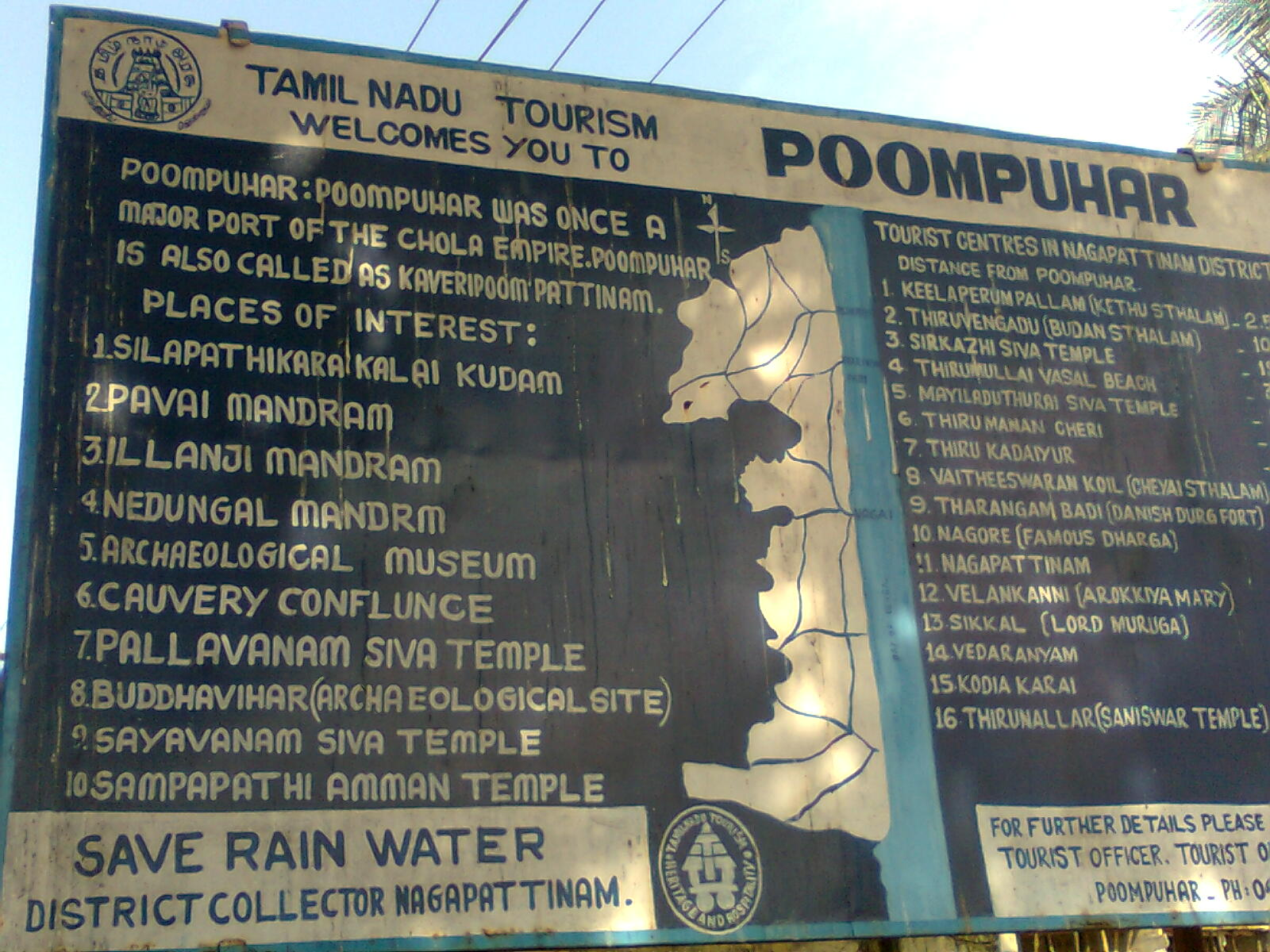
A Sign Board
