= Mangala Devi Kannagi Temple =

Ancient Hindu temple on the Kerala-Tamil Nadu border, southern India

- മംഗളദേവി കണ്ണകി അമ്പലം மங்களதேவி கண்ணகி கோவில்
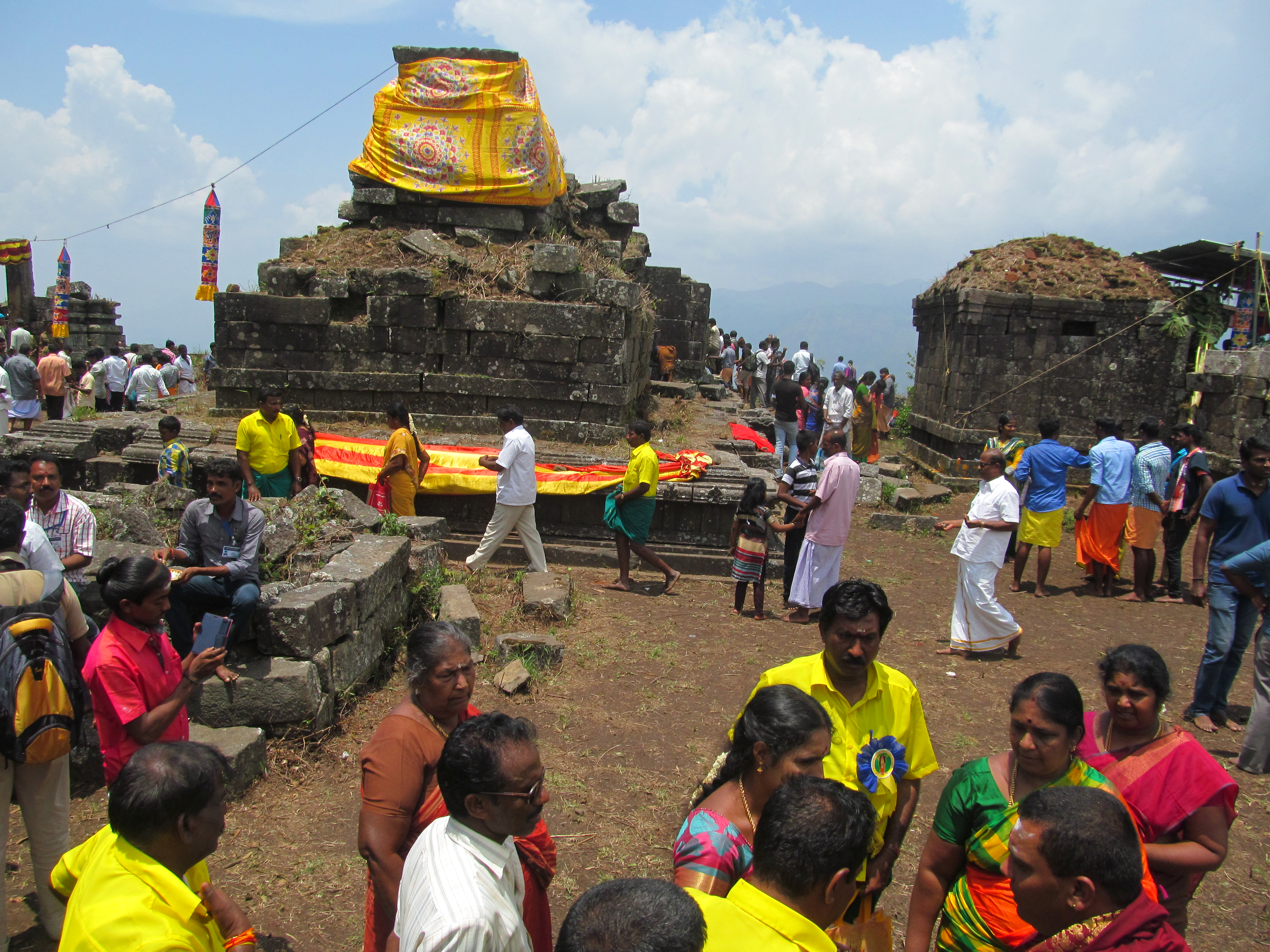

- Location in India

Religion
- Affiliation: Hinduism
- District: Idukki and Theni
- Deity: Mangaladevi/Kannagi-Pattini
- Governing body: Kerala Forest and Wildlife Department, Government of Kerala

Location
- Location: Kumily
- State: Kerala
- Country: India
- Coordinates: 9°35′53″N 77°13′19″E

Architecture
- Type: Dravidian Architecture
- Founder: Chenguttuvan (Kerala ruler)
- Established: 1st-2nd Century CE
- Inscriptions: Middle Tamil
- Elevation: 1,337 m (4,386 ft)

Mangaladevi Kannagi Temple is a Hindu temple located at Mangaladevi, near the present-day border of Theni District (of Tamil Nadu) and Idukki District (Kerala), about 7 km from Pazhiyankudi in Theni District and 15 km from Thekkady in Idukki District. The temple is situated at an altitude of about 1,337 m or about 5,000 feet above sea level (within the Periyar Tiger Reserve on the Western Ghat mountains). The temple is dedicated to goddess Mangaladevi, also known as Kannagi-Pattini. Secondary shrines are dedicated to Karuppa Swamy, lord Shiva and Ganapathy.

The temple is open for worship only during the time of "Chitra Poornami Festival" (in the April/May months). Entry to the temple for worshipers is allowed only on "Chitra Poornami Day" each year. Devotees usually trek to the temple during the "Chitra Poornami Day" every year (private vehicles are prohibited; only taxis with special permissions are allowed, and visitors usually wait in long queues to see the goddess). The number of pilgrims to the temple is estimated to be around 25,000.

The temple is usually open for visitors (in addition to worshipers) also. Visitors require prior permission from the Wildlife Warden at Thekkady.

== Historic origins ==
Legend has it that Kannagi, the heroine of the Old Tamil epic poem "Cilappatikaram", traveled to this exact location after burning the Pandya capital, Madurai, and stayed here for 14 days.

The temple is generally believed to have been consecrated around the 1st/2nd century CE and is dedicated to Kannagi. According to tradition, Chenguttuvan (fl. c.180 CE), the ruler of the early historic Chera Kingdom, dedicated the temple to Goddess Kannagi around 2,000 years ago (during the "Sangam period" or early historic period, at a location called "Vannathipara"). He apparently named it "Kannagi Kottam" or "Mangaladevi Kannagi Temple" and (personally) also performed regular worship there.

== Present forms of worship ==
Chitra Poornami Festival is usually organized by Kannagi Trust, Tamil Nadu and Ganapathy-Bhagavathy Trust, Kumily.

- Special pujas usually continue from 6 am to 4 pm.
- Inaugurating with special "pujas" and "aradhanas" to the Kannagi idol (the decorated idol of the goddess is usually covered with sandalwood and turmeric paste) in the morning.
- Both Brahmins from Kerala ("Namboodhiris") and Tamil pujaris performed pujas to the goddess jointly.
- Priests from both Kerala and Tamil Nadu states were present in all "sannadhis".
- On Chitra Poornami day, priests from both Kerala and Tamil Nadu perform puja in two different shrines.

== Current disputes ==
The temple is now located in a disputed area between the states of Kerala and Tamil Nadu, and entry is allowed only in the presence of the Theni and Idukki District Collectors and district police chiefs (in addition to state police officers and forest officials). District administrations (with support of the festival organizers) usually plan elaborate arrangements for the smooth conduct of the worship (such as a heavy show of force, the use of bamboo barricades and metal detectors, food and water distribution systems, etc.).

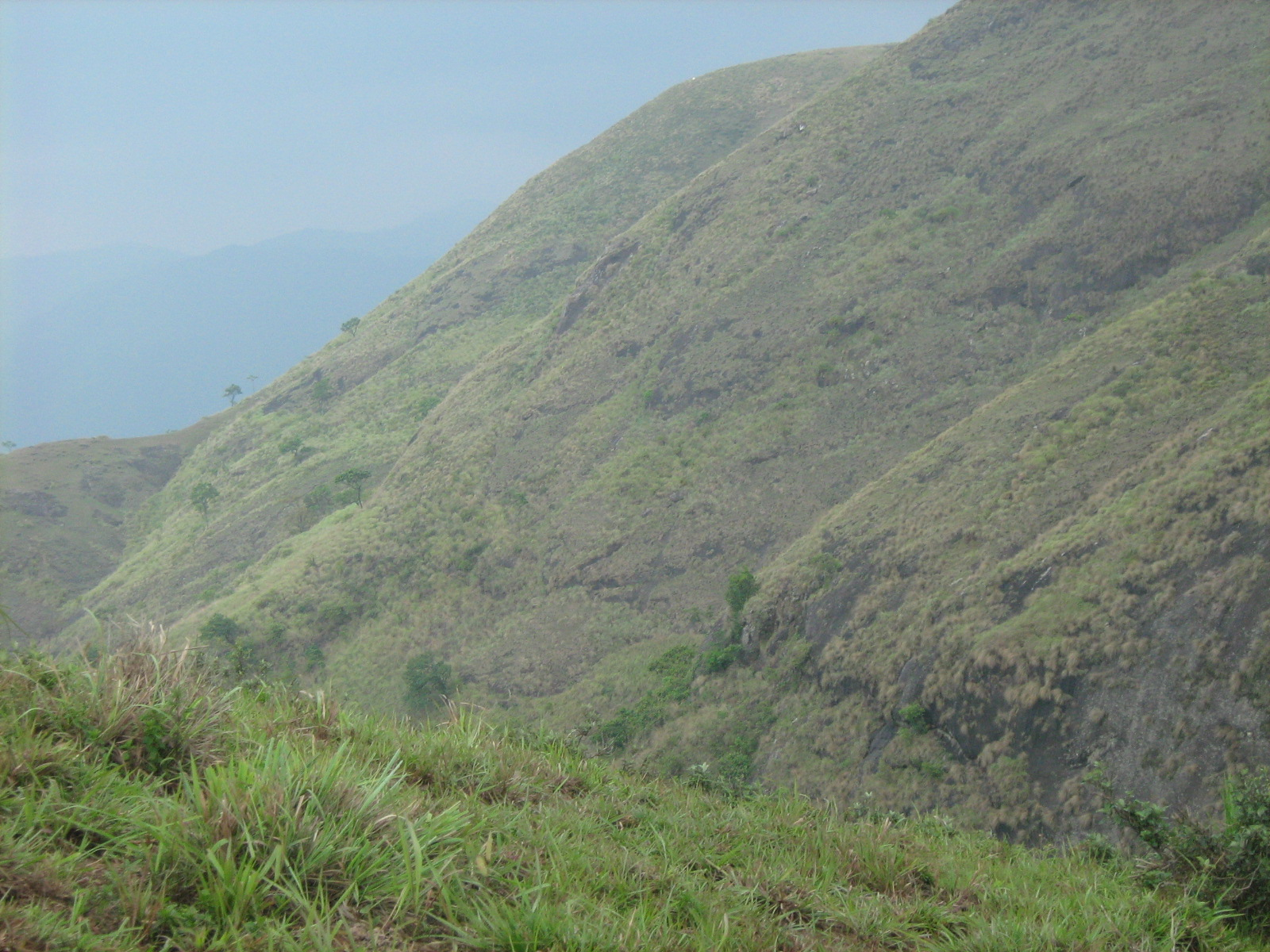
A view from the premises of Mangaladevi Temple.

The Tamil Nadu government has expressed its intention to bring the temple back under its jurisdiction (under the Hindu Religious and Charitable Endowments Department).

== See also ==
- Mundeshwari Temple
- Murugan Temple, Saluvankuppam
