= Poompuhar Beach =

Beach in Tamil Nadu, India

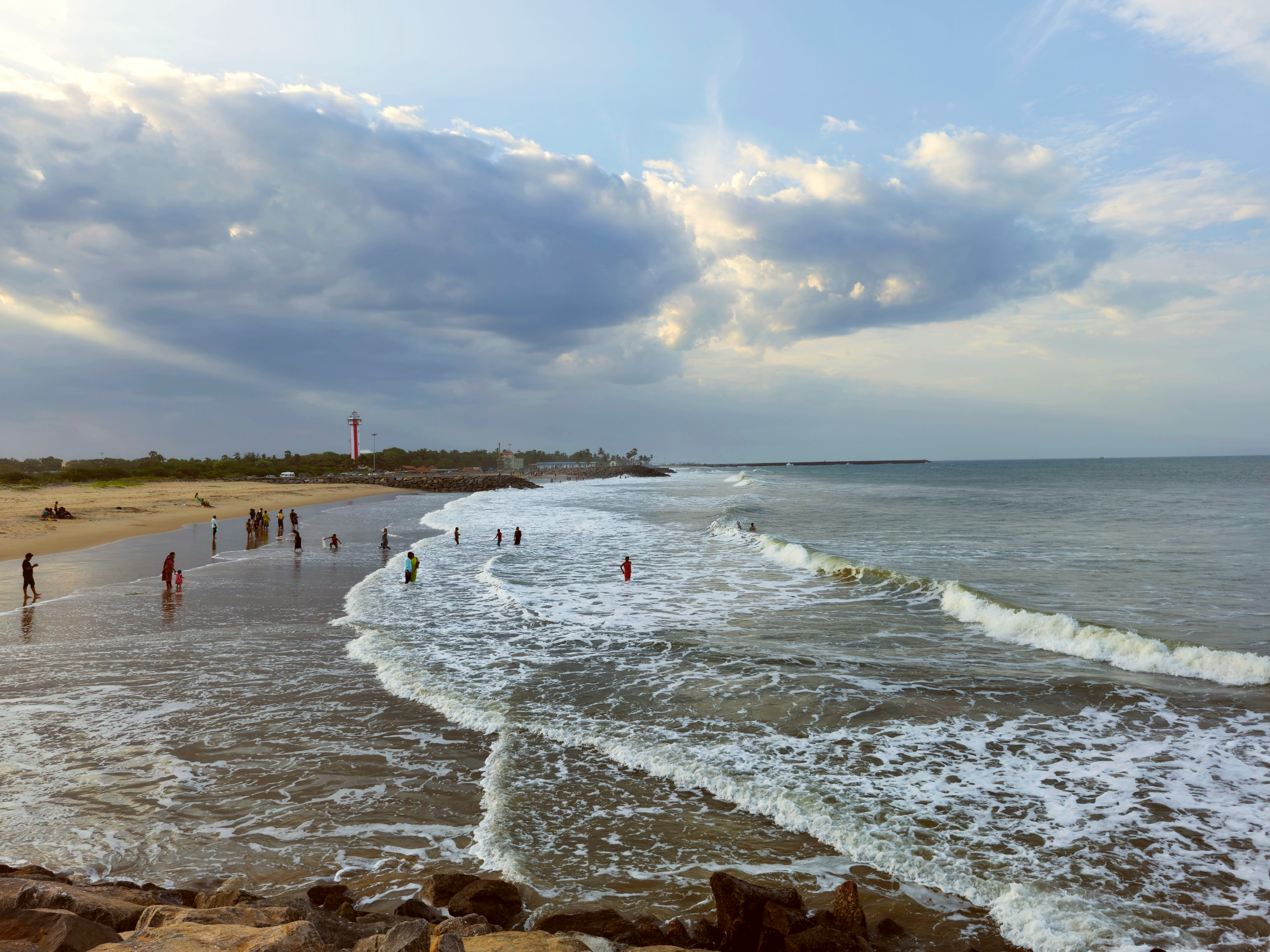
Poompuhar Beach with lighthouse

Poompuhar Beach is a natural and ancient beach located in Poompuhar, Tamil Nadu, India, along the Bay of Bengal. The beach starts from the Kaveri river and extends around 3 km north side towards Neithavasal. The sand of this beach spreads out around 3 kilometers. Recently granite stone has been placed on the shore to stop erosion. This beach and Poompuhar city plays an important role in South Indian history. Chitra Pournami is an important festival for this beach which happens during the full moon in Tamil, month chittrai. There also occurs a Holy dip in the mouth of Kaveri river is celebrated during new moon in the Tamil month of Thai and Adi. Mayiladuthurai is the nearest town which is located on the bank of Kaveri around 24 km away from this beach.
