= Aranjana Charadu =

Traditional South Indian girdle

Aranjana Charadu or Arainjaan Kayiru (Malayalam: അരഞ്ഞാണ ചരട് Tamil: ta:அரைஞாண் கயிறு Telugu: మొలతాడు) is a traditional custom prevalent in South India, especially among the Hindu and Muslim communities. It involves the ritual of tying a sacred thread around the waist as a symbol of protection from evil spirits. This practice has been passed down through generations, deeply embedded in the cultural and religious beliefs of the people.

== Background ==
Aranjana Charadu, also known as Araignan Kayiru or Arana Kayiru, is a waist thread that holds significant religious and cultural importance in South India. Traditionally, it is tied around the waist, just above the genital area. Made typically of cotton or silk, the thread is usually red or black in colour. It is believed to possess spiritual properties that counteract the adverse effects of evil forces and ward off the evil eye. Different colours of threads are associated with specific purposes: black threads are thought to protect against malevolent influences, while red threads are believed to safeguard against the effects of enemies. Alongside the waist thread, some individuals also wear amulets, known as "elas" in Malayalam and "thayattu" in Tamil.

According to Indian mythology, wearing the waist thread helps negate the effects of nudity on the body. It is a common belief that one should never remain nude from birth until death, and wearing the thread fulfills this requirement, nullifying potential negative impacts of nudity. This practice is deeply ingrained in the cultural and spiritual beliefs of many people in India, who consider it an essential aspect of maintaining modesty, purity, and spiritual harmony.

The concept of waist threads is also closely linked to the Indian Tantric tradition, particularly concerning the "Nabhi Chakra" and the "Mooladhar Chakra." The Nabhi Chakra is believed to be located at the navel, while the Mooladhar Chakra is connected to the reproductive organs of both males and females. These organs are considered to be protected from negative influences by wearing a silver or gold chain around the waist. This practice is thought to enhance and preserve the vital energy associated with the Mooladhar Chakra, thereby preventing it from being wasted in uncontrolled sexual desires.

The tradition of wearing a waist thread extends beyond spiritual or superstitious beliefs, encompassing significant health aspects as well. In ancient times, when scientific explanations were scarce, people depended on religious and cultural practices to maintain their well-being. The waist thread is believed to promote the growth of strong and healthy genitals, prevent conditions such as hernia, contribute to the development of healthy bones, aid in controlling weight and waist size by improving digestion, and enhance fertility. These health benefits were particularly valued in ancient times when scientific knowledge was limited, leading people to rely on religious and cultural practices for their health and well-being.

== Meaning ==
The tradition of wearing the Aranjana Charadu is deeply rooted in South Indian culture, symbolizing faith, protection and connection to cultural heritage. While it is primarily observed by the Hindu and Muslim communities, the practice goes beyond religious boundaries, with individuals from various backgrounds embracing this custom.

The waist thread is known by different names in various regions of South India. In Tamil Nadu, it is referred to as "Araignan Kayiru" or "Arana Kayiru." Additionally, the thread can be made from different materials, including cotton, silk, and precious metals such as silver or gold. The use of these metals lends an additional layer of opulence to its religious and cultural significance.

== See also ==
- Jewellery of Tamil Nadu
- Aranjanam
