= Godparent =

Person who sponsors a child's baptism

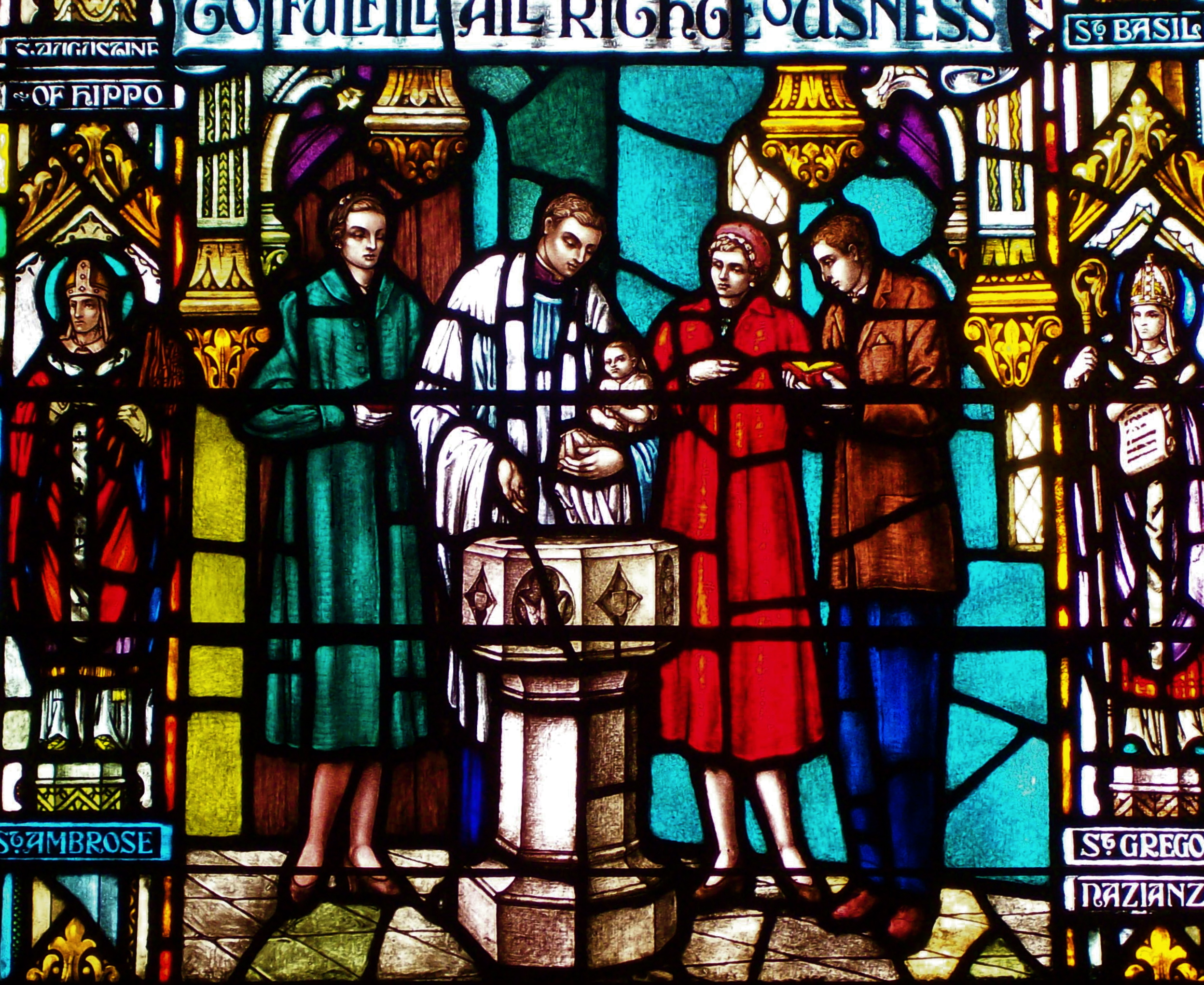
Detail from the "Baptism Window" at St. Mary's Episcopal Cathedral in Memphis, Tennessee, showing godparents from the mid-20th century

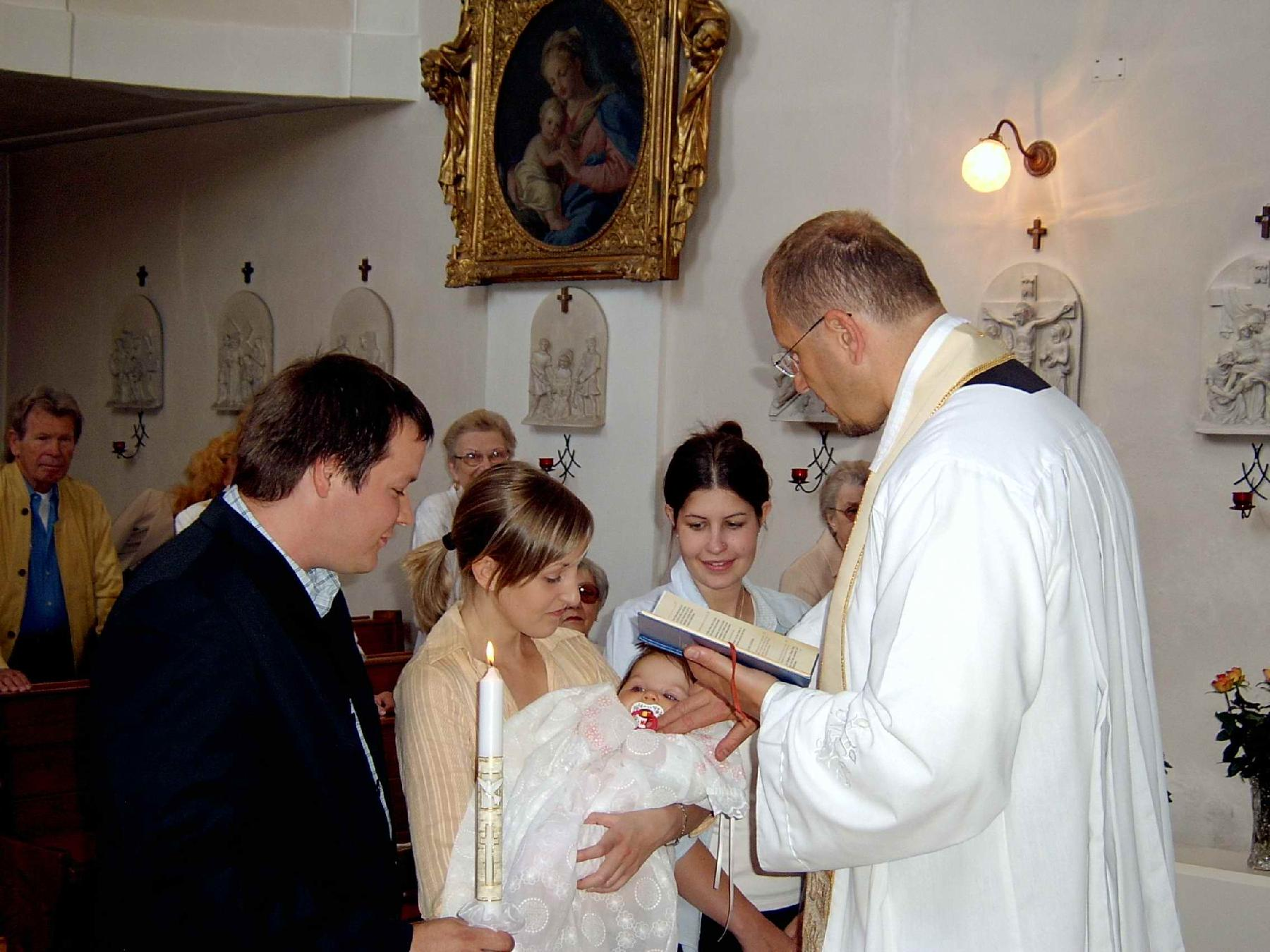
A Catholic priest baptizing a child

Within Christianity, a godparent or sponsor is someone who bears witness to a child's baptism (christening) and later is willing to help in their catechesis, as well as their lifelong spiritual formation. In both religious and civil views, a godparent tends to be an individual chosen by the parents to take an interest in the child's upbringing and personal development, and to offer mentorship. A male godparent is a godfather, and a female godparent is a godmother. The child is a godchild (i.e., godson for boys and goddaughter for girls).

== Christianity ==
=== Origins and history ===
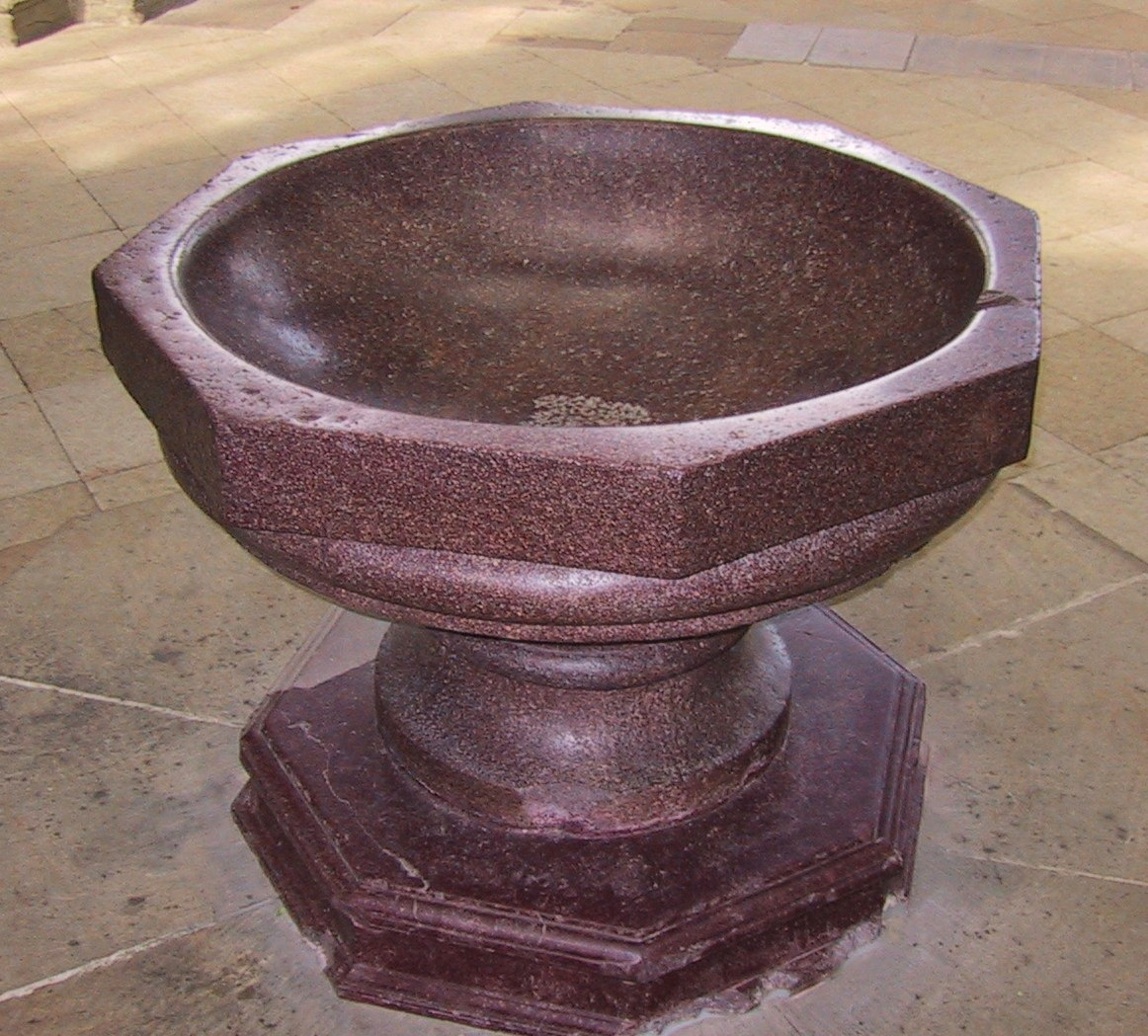
The baptismal font at the Cathedral of Magdeburg

As early as the 2nd century AD, infant baptism had begun to gain acceptance among Christians for the spiritual purification and social initiation of infants.

Normally, these sponsors were the birth parents of a child, as emphasized in 408 by St. Augustine who suggested that the sponsors could be other individuals in exceptional circumstances. Within a century, the Corpus Juris Civilis indicates that parents had been replaced in this role almost completely by those who were not the child's birth parents. This was clarified in 813 when the Synod of Mainz prohibited natural parents from acting as godparents to their own children.

By the 5th century, male sponsors were referred to as "spiritual fathers", and by the end of the 6th century, they were being referred to as "compaters" and "commaters", suggesting that these were being seen as spiritual co-parents.

Around the same time, laws intended to prevent marriage between family members were extended to include marriage between godparents and godchildren. A decree of Justinian, dated to 530, outlawed marriage between a godfather and his goddaughter, and these barriers continued to multiply until the 11th century, forbidding marriage between natural and spiritual parents, or those directly related to them. As confirmation emerged as a separate rite from baptism from the 8th century, a second set of sponsors, with similar prohibitions, also emerged. The exact extent of these spiritual relationships as a bar to marriage in Catholicism was unclear until the Council of Trent, which limited it to relationships between the godparents, the child, and the parents.

According to historian John Bossy, by the Middle Ages it was "a means of transcending natural kinship alliances and creating wider relationships of protection, support and friendship in a feuding society: the sacrament of baptism established a network of relationship which disarmed hostility and brought unity and peace."

==== During the Reformation ====
Luther, Zwingli, and Calvin preserved infant baptism (and the accompanying baptismal sponsors) in their respective Protestant denominations despite opposition from more radical reformers such as Anabaptists. Their respective visions of the role played by godparents differed from mainstream Catholicism. Luther was opposed to the prohibition of marriage between god-parents and -children, Zwingli placed more emphasis on the role played by the parents and pastors, and Calvin preferred the birth parents serving as sponsors. Among French Calvinists and the residents of Geneva, it became the norm to have one godparent; other Calvinists, most notably in Scotland and the English colonies in America, did away with them entirely.

The customary obligation of godfathers for Catholics (at least in Scotland) was stated in Nicol Burne's Of the praying in Latine (1581) in relation to Latin public prayers in church:

...if any man pray in any other tongue (i.e. than his own), it is also expedient that he understand the meaning of the words at the least. For the which cause in the catholic church the parents or godfathers are obliged to learn them (i.e. to make sure they have learned) whom they held in baptism the forms of prayers and belief, and instruct them sufficiently therein, so that they understand the same:

==== Numbers of sponsors ====
In the early church, one sponsor seems to have been the norm, but in the early Middle Ages, there seems to have been two, one of each sex, and this practice has been largely maintained in Orthodox Christianity. In 888, the Catholic Council of Metz attempted to limit the number to one, but this limit seems not to have been observed. In early 14th-century Spain, as many as 20 godparents were being chosen for a single child. In England, the Synod of Worcester (1240) stipulated three sponsors (two of the same sex and one of the opposite), and this has remained the norm in the Church of England. The Council of Trent attempted to limit the numbers of godparents to one or two, but practice has differed across the Catholic world.

=== Modern practices ===
==== Anglican Communion ====
The Church of England, the mother Church of the Anglican Communion, retained godparents in baptism, formally removing the marriage barriers in 1540, but the issue of the role and status of godparents continued to be debated in the English Church. They were abolished in 1644 by the Directory of Public Worship promulgated by the English Civil War Parliamentary regime, but continued to be used in some parishes in the north of England. After the Restoration in 1660, they were reintroduced to Anglicanism, with occasional objections, but dropped by almost every dissenting church. There is some evidence that the restored institution had lost some of its social importance as well as its universality.

At present, in the Church of England, relatives can stand as godparents, and although it is not clear that parents can be godparents, they sometimes are. Godparents should be both baptised and confirmed (although it is not clear in which Church), but the requirement for confirmation can be waived. There is no requirement for clergy to baptise those from outside their parishes, and baptism can be reasonably delayed so that the conditions, including suitable godparents, can be met. As a result, individual clergy have considerable discretion over the qualifications of godparents. Many "contemporary Anglican rites likewise require parents and godparents to respond on behalf of infant [baptismal] candidates."

==== Lutheran churches ====
Lutherans follow a similar theology of godparents as Catholics. They believe that godparents "help [children] with their Christian upbringing, especially if they should lose their parents". Lutherans, like Catholics, believe that a godparent must be both a baptized and confirmed Christian. Some Lutherans also follow the Catholic tradition that a Christian who is not affiliated with the Lutheran denomination may serve as a witness rather than a godparent.

==== Methodist Church ====
The Book of Discipline stipulates that it is the duty of a godparent, also known as a sponsor, "to provide training for the children of the Church throughout their childhood that will lead to a personal commitment to Jesus Christ as Lord and Savior, to an understanding of the Christian faith, and to an appreciation of the privileges and obligations of baptism and membership (¶ 225.4)." John Wesley, the founder of the Methodist Church, wrote a homily titled "Serious Thoughts Concerning Godfathers and Godmothers" in which he stated that godparents are "spiritual parents to the baptized, whether they were infants or [adults]; and were expected to supply whatever spiritual helps were wanting either through the death or neglect of the natural parents." He described the role of godparents, instructing that they should call upon their godchild "to hear sermons, and shall provide that he(/she) may learn the Creed, the Lord's Prayer, and the Ten Commandments, and all other things which a Christian ought to know and believe to his soul's health; and that this child be virtuously brought up, to lead a godly and a Christian life." As such, the Book of Worship states that godparents/sponsors should be "selected carefully" and "should be members of Christ's holy Church; and it is the duty of pastors to instruct them concerning the significance of Holy Baptism, their responsibilities for the Christian training of the baptized child, and how these obligations may be fulfilled."

==== Orthodox Church ====
The Orthodox institution of godparenthood has been the least affected of the major traditions by change. In some Orthodox churches (Serbian, Greek) usually the best man (kum, кум, koumbaros) or bridesmaid (kuma, кума, koumbara) at a couple's wedding act as a godparent to the first or all children of the marriage. In some instances, the godfather is responsible for naming the child. A godparent to a child will then act as a sponsor at the child's wedding. Godparents are expected to be in good standing in the Orthodox church, including its rulings on divorce, and aware of the meaning and responsibilities of their role.

==== Reformed Churches ====
In the Reformed tradition that includes the Continental Reformed, Congregationalist and Presbyterian Churches, the godparents are more often referred to as sponsors, who have the role of standing with the child during infant baptism and pledging to instruct the child in the faith. In the baptismal liturgy of Reformed Geneva, "the traditional presence of godparents was retained". John Calvin, the progenitor of the Reformed tradition, himself served as a godparent during 47 baptisms. The Reformed Church in Geneva, in order to ensure confessional orthodoxy, "expected parents to select Reformed godparents." Today, many Reformed churches invite parents to select godparents for their prospective neophyte, while other parishes entrust this responsibility to the whole congregation.

==== Catholic Church ====
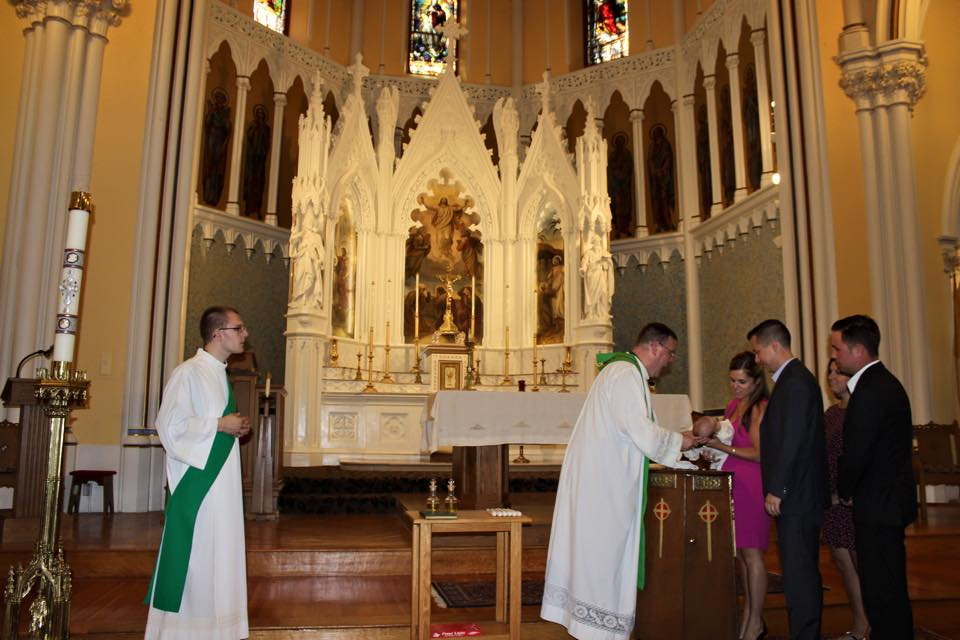
A child being baptized with her parents and godparents

The Catholic institution of godparenthood survived the Reformation largely unchanged. A godparent must normally be an appropriate person, at least 16 years of age, a confirmed Catholic who has received the Eucharist, not under any canonical penalty, and may not be the parent of the child. Someone who belongs to another Christian church cannot become a godparent but can be a 'witness' in conjunction with a Catholic sponsor. A witness does not have any religious role recognized by the Church.

In some Medieval confession manuals, the priest was encouraged to check that a godparent was fulfilling their duty to teach the Creed and the Lord's Prayer.

In 2015, the Vatican declared that transgender Catholics cannot become godparents, stating in response to a transgender man's query that transgender status "reveals in a public way an attitude opposite to the moral imperative of solving the problem of sexual identity according to the truth of one's own sexuality" and that "[t]herefore it is evident that this person does not possess the requirement of leading a life according to the faith and in the position of godfather and is therefore unable to be admitted to the position of godfather or godmother." The Vatican reversed this stance in 2023, noting, however, that a transgender person may still be denied godparenthood if "there is a danger of scandal, undue legitimisation or disorientation in the educational sphere of the church community".

=== Spiritual kinship ===
In some Catholic and Orthodox countries, particularly in southern Europe, Latin America, and the Philippines, the relationship between parents and godparents or co-godparents has been seen as particularly important and distinctive. These relationships create mutual obligations and responsibilities that may be socially useful for participants. The Portuguese and Spanish compadre (literally, "co-father") and comadre ("co-mother"), the French marraine and parrain, and the archaic meaning of the English word gossip (from godsib, "godsibling"), describe these relationships.

The Spanish and Portuguese words for the godparent roles are used for members of the wedding party—padrino/padrinho meaning "godfather" or "best man" and madrina/madrinha meaning "godmother" or "matron of honor", reflecting the custom of baptismal sponsors acting in this role in a couple's wedding.

=== Literature and folklore ===
Godparents are noted features of fairy tales and folklore written from the 17th century onwards, and by extension, have found their way into many modern works of fiction. In Godfather Death, presented by the Brothers Grimm, the archetype is, unusually, a supernatural godfather. However, most are a fairy godmother as in versions of Cinderella, Sleeping Beauty, and The Blue Bird. This feature may simply reflect the Catholic milieu in which most fairy tales were created, or at least recorded, and the accepted role of godparents as helpers from outside the family, but English historian Marina Warner suggests that they may be a form of wish fulfilment by female narrators.

== Non-Christian traditions ==
=== Santería ===
In the Yoruba-derived Santería from Cuba, godparents must have completed their santo or their Ifá. A person gets his Madrina and Yubona (co-godmother) or his Padrino and Yubon (co-godfather). A santero, aside from his co-godparents, may have an oluo (babalawo, initiate of ifa) who consults him with an ekuele (divining chain).

=== Judaism ===
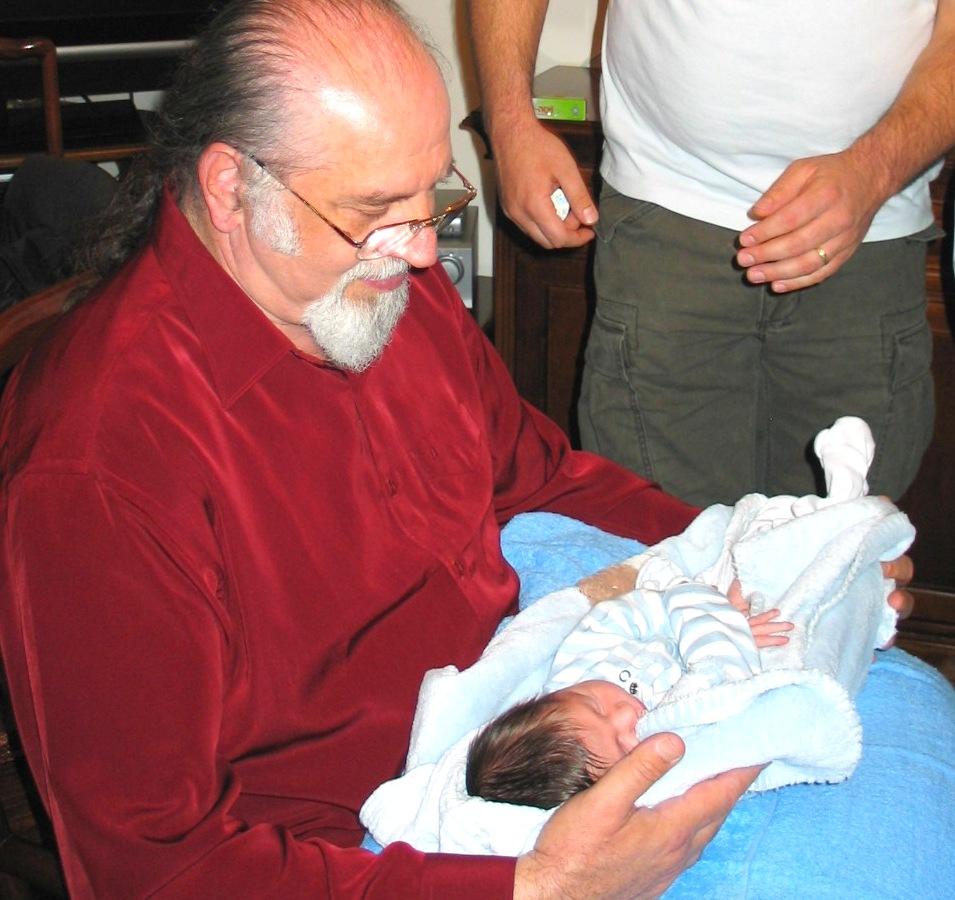
Brit milah—the sandek holds the baby boy.

There are two roles in the Jewish circumcision ceremony that are sometimes translated as godparent. The sandek, in Orthodox Judaism a man, sits on a specially designated chair, and holds the baby boy while he is circumcised.

Among Orthodox Ashkenazi, the kvater is the married couple who bring the child from his mother to where the circumcision is performed. The mother gives the baby to the woman, who gives the baby to her husband, who then carries the baby the rest of the way. The announcement "Kvatter" is the signal for the man to walk to where he will get the baby, and also for that man's wife to walk to the lady holding the baby (usually the mother), if she is not already standing there.

Kvater is etymologically derived from the archaic German Gevatter ("godfather"). Historically, the Jewish ‘Godfather’ bears responsibility for seeing that the child is properly raised, if both parents die young. Amongst the Kvater's many responsibilities, he is also obligated to ensure that the Godmother (should one be appointed) is fully capable of discharging her duties. Should he deem her irresponsible, he can revoke her status as Godmother by proclamation.

=== Chinese traditions ===
Some Chinese communities practise the custom of matching a child with a relative or family friend who becomes the voluntary/"dry" mother (yimu / ganma 義母/乾媽) or voluntary/"dry" father (yifu / gandie 義父/乾爹). This practice is largely non-religious in nature, but commonly done to strengthen ties or to fulfil the wish of a childless adult to have a "son/daughter". In most circumstances, an auspicious day is selected on which a ceremony takes place, involving the godchild paying his/her respects to his new godfather/godmother in the presence of relatives or friends.

Alternatively, as it is already common in Chinese kinship to use kinship terms among people that are not related (e.g. addressing a respected coworker as "brother" or one's father's friend may be referred to as "uncle"), an older friend or family friend with a deep friendship and a sufficient age gap will also informally address the other as his godparent or godchild, a gesture often initiated by the older person.

=== Kirvelik ===
A kind of fictive kinship relationship called kirîvatî exists connected with the Islamic ritual of circumcision. The man who holds a male child who is being circumcised becomes the kirîv of the child; at the same time, the kirîv and the boy's parents become kirîvs in relation to each other. Kirvelik / kirîvahî comes with particular duties, responsibilities and traditions. It has been compared to compadrazgo in Latin America and kumstvo in the Balkans.

=== Humanist and non-religious ceremonies ===
Non-religious naming ceremonies, offered by humanist organisations as an alternative to christening, commonly include the appointment of adults who make promises to the child in a role equivalent to that of a godparent but without any religious content. In the United Kingdom the most widely used term is guideparent; mentor, guardian, sponsor and supporting adult are also used, as are informal coinages such as oddparent and sparent, while some families retain the word godparent on the understanding that the religious element does not apply. Since there is no liturgical framework, there is no fixed number of guideparents and no requirement as to their sex, marital status or beliefs. Guideparents typically make collective or individual promises, and may contribute readings or take part in symbolic acts such as sand-blending or the signing of a naming certificate.

Non-religious naming ceremonies in Britain date to at least 1849, when George Jacob Holyoake named the infant son of the radical publisher Edward Truelove in an Owenite ceremony that called on those present to help raise the child. Holyoake later argued that such ceremonies should be consistent with the convictions of those in whose name they were held. The British Humanist Association (now Humanists UK) published a practical guide to non-religious namings, New Arrivals, in 1991, later revised with its then executive director Robert Ashby. By 2019 Humanists UK was reporting a 60 per cent rise in naming ceremonies over the preceding five years, and said that almost all of them involved guideparents. Local authorities in England and Wales also offer civil naming ceremonies, at which parents may nominate up to four adults who promise a supporting relationship with the child.

Similar practices exist elsewhere. In the United States, celebrants endorsed by the Humanist Society of the American Humanist Association conduct baby-naming ceremonies at which "guide parents" may be designated in place of godparents. In Norway, the Norwegian Humanist Association has held collective humanist naming ceremonies (navnefest) since 1988; unlike Lutheran baptism, the ceremony has no godparent (fadder) or witness role.

== See also ==
- Catechumen
- Legal guardian
