= Naming ceremony =

Stage at which people are assigned names

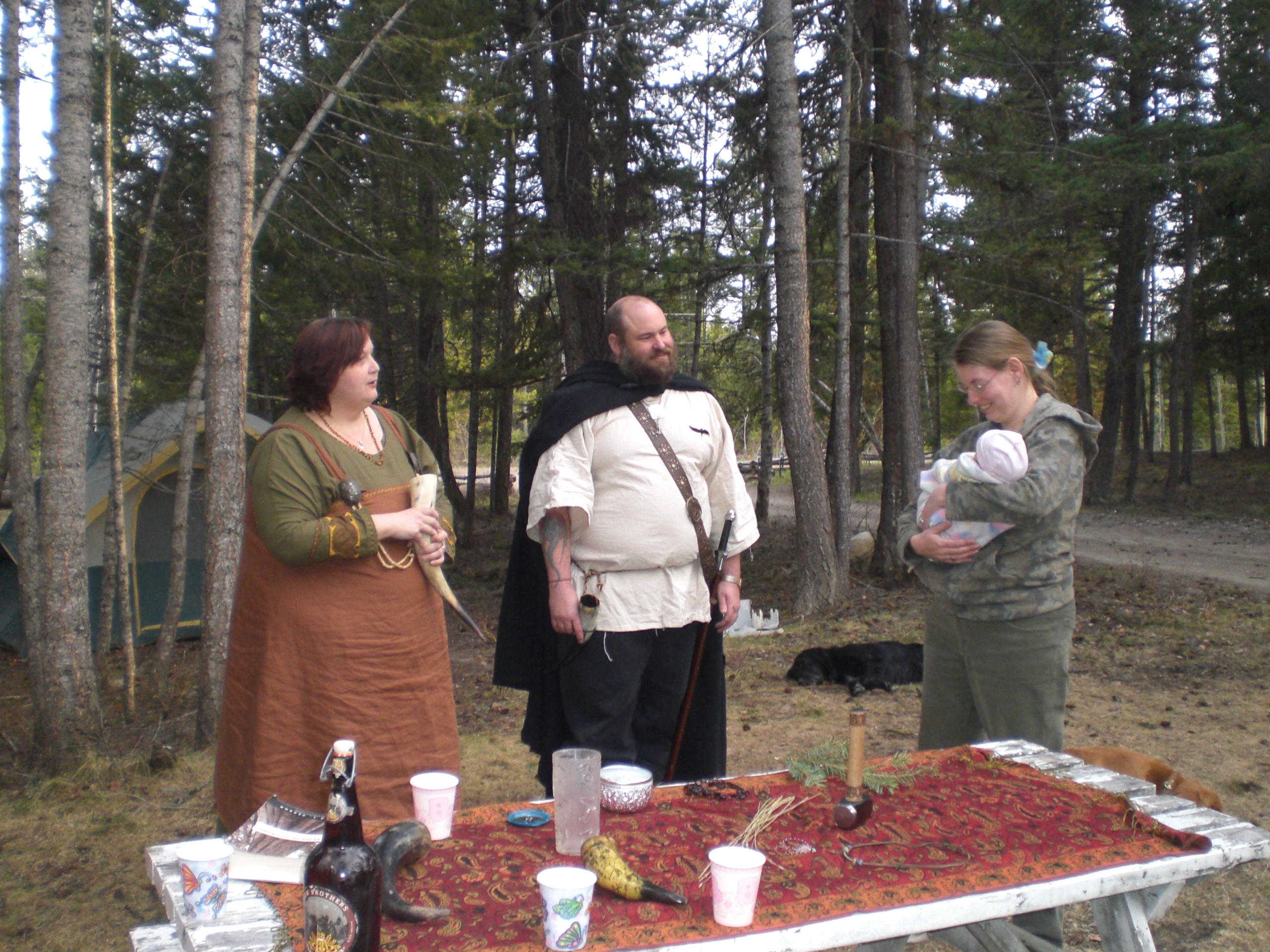
A mother and newborn take part in a heathenry baby naming ceremony in British Columbia in 2007.

A naming ceremony is a stage at which a person or persons is officially assigned a name. The methods of the practice differ over cultures and religions. The timing at which a name is assigned can vary from some days after birth to several months or many years.

== In religions and cultures ==
=== Christianity ===
Naming a child, popularly referred to as "christening", is usually through the baptism ceremony in Christianity, especially Catholic culture, and to a lesser degree among Protestant groups who practice infant baptism. In Eastern Orthodoxy, infants are traditionally named on the eighth day of life in a special service conducted either at home or in church. Often, Christians will also adhere to local traditions of the land in which they were born. For example, in Kerala, the traditional Hindu custom of tying an aranjanam (see below) is followed even by Christian families. In the Church of Jesus Christ of Latter-day Saints, infants are traditionally given a name and a blessing on the first Sunday of the month after birth by the child's father if he holds priesthood authority to do so and if the ordinance has been authorized by his local ecclesiastical leader. The timing may be adapted to family circumstances.

=== Hinduism ===
In Hinduism, the ceremony is traditionally known as Namakarana or the Namakarana Samskara, and is conducted on the twelfth day after birth. In Kerala, this is done on the 28th day and called the Noolukettu (transl. tying thread).

In Nepal, the naming ceremony is known as Nwaran. In the Hindu tradition, it is celebrated on the eleventh day after birth. The child is given a name according to their lunar horoscope, and may not be their legal or preferred name; the name from this ceremony is usually reserved for religious activities and horoscopes. Typically, a priest is invited to perform the ceremony at home and charts the child's lunar horoscope based on their birth details, as the mother is still recovering with the child. It is also known as Machabu Byakegu in Newari. This ceremony is normally small and celebrated only by the child’s close family. The next important ceremony is the Pasni.

The Chhathi Ceremony is performed when the baby is six days old. This ceremony is primarily for women and is timed to take place late at night, such as between ten o'clock and midnight. According to folklore, on the sixth day after the child’s birth, the goddess Vidhata would quietly enter the house around midnight to pen the destiny of the newborn. Traditionally, the mother of the newborn lights a diya, which she then places along with a red pen and paper on a wooden plank for Vidhata to inscribe the future of the newborn. The mother, while holding the newborn in her arms, kneels before the lamp, which symbolises Vidhata. The baby can also be named on this day.

The Namakarma Samskara is usually held after the first eleven nights of a baby's delivery. This is considered an adjustment period for the child, making them vulnerable to infections. To prevent this, the mother and child are quarantined from the rest of the family during these ten days, during which no one except a helper or the maternal grandmother is allowed to touch either of them. All festivals and events in the family and extended family are postponed by eleven nights, after which the house is decorated and sanctified for the ceremony. The mother and child are bathed in the traditional manner to avoid infecting them in preparation for the ceremony. Relatives and close friends are invited to be a part of this occasion and bless the child, and priests come to perform the ritual.

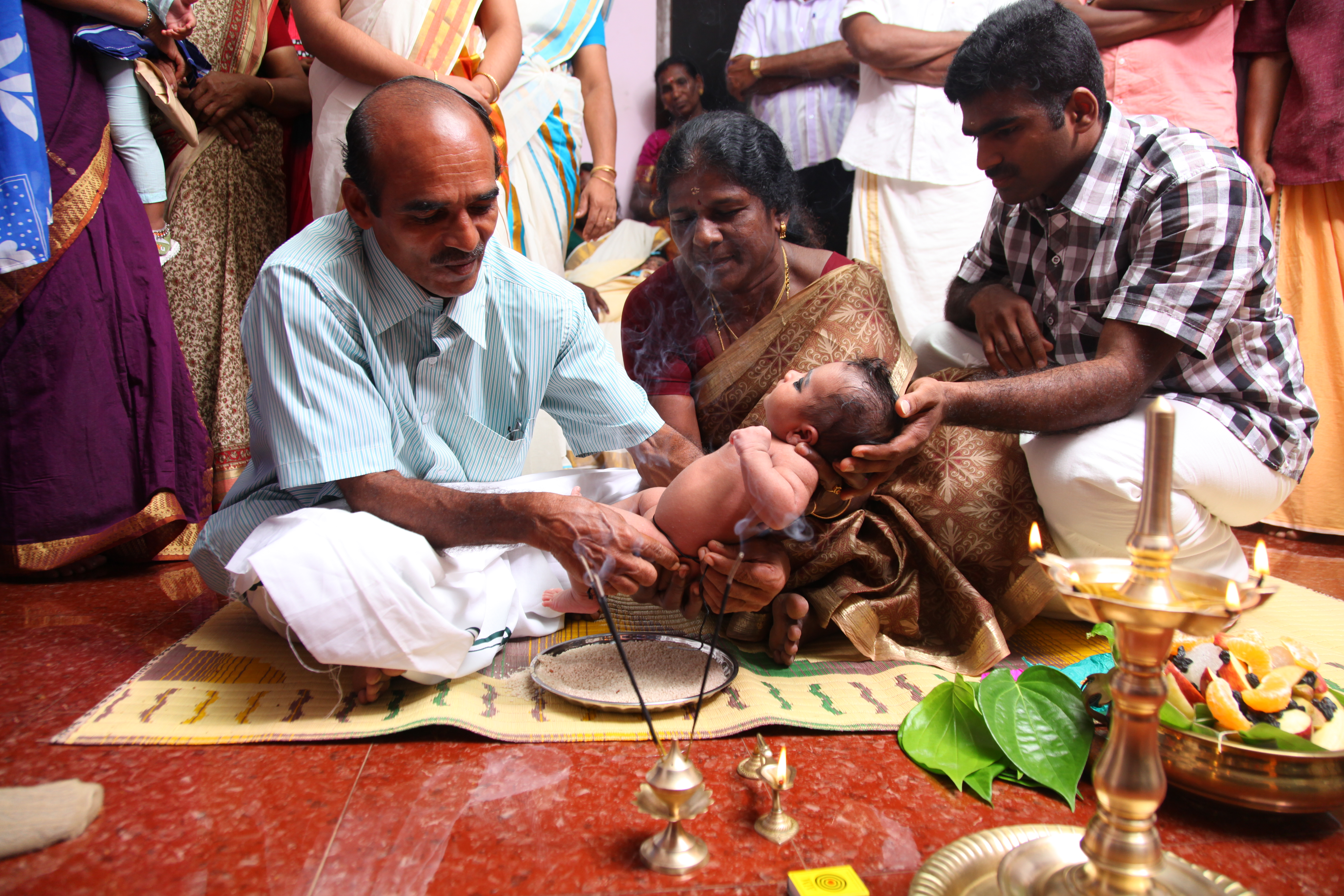
A baby's paternal grandfather in Kerala performing Nool Kettu by tying a black string on the waist of the child

The people involved in the baby-naming ceremony are the parents of the newborn, the paternal and maternal grandparents and a few close relatives and friends. In Maharashtra, Bengal, and among the Rajputs of Gujarat the paternal aunt has the honour of naming her brother's child. The child is dressed in new clothes and the mother pours some drops of water on her baby's head to symbolically purify the child. In some communities, the baby is then handed over to the paternal grandmother or the father who sits near the priest during the ritual. Where the paternal aunt names the child, she whispers the newborn's name in their ear and then announces it to the gathered family and friends. In some communities or families, the sacred fire is lit and the priest chants sacred hymns to invoke the deities in heaven to bless the child.

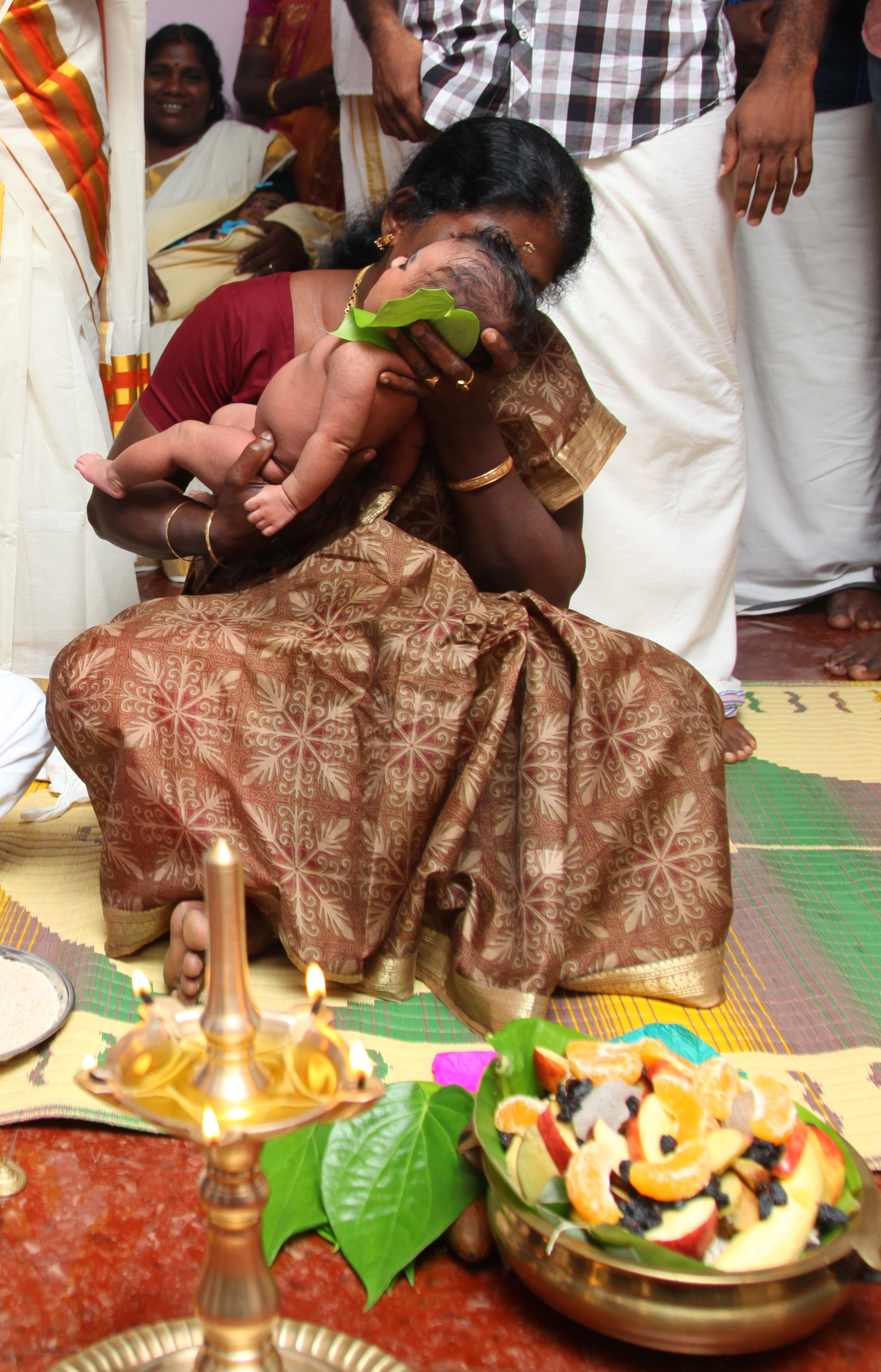
A baby's paternal grandmother in Kerala whispers the child's name three times in her ear with the other ear closed with a betel leaf during the naming ceremony.

This may differ from place to place. In some parts of Northern Kerala, the grandfather, the child's father or the maternal uncle whispers the child's name. These functions change from place to place. On this day, baby is put into a cradle for the first time.

In Kerala, a black thread and gold chain called an aranjanam are tied around the baby's waist on the 28th day. In certain parts of the state, it is performed on the 27th day if it is a boy. The child's eyes are lined with mayye or kanmashi (kohl). A black spot is also placed on one cheek or asymmetrically on the forehead, to ward off the evil eye. The grandfather whispers the chosen Hindu name in the child's right ear three times, while the left ear is covered with a betel leaf. This is then repeated in the left ear. A mixture of ghee or honey is given to the infant as a first food. At some places, an arati is performed seven times with a lamp wick in a leaf.

According to the date and time of birth of the child, a particular letter of the Sanskrit alphabet associated with the child's solar birth sign (Surya Rashi) is chosen for its auspiciousness, and the baby is given a name starting with that letter. Usually, the grandfather whispers the name four times in the right ear of the baby. In Maharashtra, this is done by the paternal aunt. The baby receives blessings from all, including the priests. An elaborate feast is organized for the priests and the guests, as a closing event of the ceremony.

The Namakarana Samskara is also performed for adult converts to Hinduism as a formal initiation rite. The convert chooses a Hindu name to declare his allegiance to Hinduism and his severance from their previous beliefs. A Yajna (Vedic fire sacrifice) is then performed and the convert writes his new name in a tray of uncooked rice.

In Maharashtra, women traditionally changed their birth name upon marriage. The new name was selected by the husband to complement his own. For example, a groom named Vishnu would change his bride's name to Lakshmi, the consort of Vishnu; a Ramachandra would change his bride's name to Sita; and so on. Usually, the husband writes the new name in a plate filled with dry, uncooked rice.

=== Humanism ===
Some secular humanists perform a naming ceremony as a non-religious alternative to ceremonies such as christening. The purpose is to recognise and celebrate the arrival of a child and welcome him or her in the family and circle of friends. The structure often reflects that of more traditional naming ceremonies, with a formal ceremony led by a humanist celebrant in which the parents name 'guide parents', 'mentors' or 'supporting adults' instead of godparents. This is often followed by a celebratory party.

The earliest recorded humanist naming ceremony was in London in 1849, a "secular naming ceremony" for Mazzini Truelove, son of the radical publisher Edward Truelove. Influenced by Owenite thinking, it was conducted by George Jacob Holyoake, a prominent member of the humanist and Co-operative movements in Britain who had coined the term "secularism".

=== Islam ===
In Islam, the baby is named on the seventh day by the mother and father who select the name together. They choose an appropriate name, with a positive meaning. Aqiqah takes place on the seventh day also, this is a celebration which involves the slaughter of sheep. Sheep are sacrificed and the meat is distributed to relatives and neighbours and given to the poor. If the father does not have enough funds, he may do it anytime in future as long as it is done in general.

In Turkish traditions, the paternal grandfather whispers the adhan (call to prayer) into the right ear of the baby, and afterward repeats or tells the chosen name of the newborn baby three times.

=== Judaism ===
In Jewish tradition, baby boys are named at a brit milah on the eighth day after their birth, the ceremony usually includes circumcision. Girls are named within the first two weeks. Common Ashkenazi custom maintains that girls should be named when the father is called up to the Torah on a Torah reading day closest or close to when the girl is born, although practice often has baby girls named at the Torah reading on the first Shabbat following birth. A resurgence in recent generations of the less popular simchat bat ceremony for naming baby girls has recently taken hold in many modern Orthodox Ashkenazi communities. An alternative naming ceremony without circumcision, sometimes called brit shalom, exists and is recognized by some branches of Judaism including Reform Judaism which affirmed the practice in 1892.

=== Wicca ===
In the Wiccan religion, at the initiation ritual, initiates adopt a Wiccan name, often referred to as a Craft name. For a Wiccan, taking a Wiccan name symbolizes a rebirth. This name is not generally used in public, but only among other Wiccans in religious gatherings. Some Wiccans do use their Craft name in public contexts, such as author Silver RavenWolf, who publishes under a Craft name.

=== Druidism ===
In Druidism, the naming ceremony may sometimes be called "The First Oath" and is used similarly in Wiccan. The name is usually referred to as a 'Holy Name' or 'Druid Name'. The First Oath may be used in private, but it sometimes customary to have a witness or members of the hearth or grove with which they are involved, participate in the oath. This First Oath may be said within a Naming Ritual or Ceremony or simply used on its own. Something totally different than this may be said:

"I, [state your civil name], choose the name [state your druid or holy name] to honor the Kindred who include the Deities, Nature Spirits and Ancestors. I declare myself to be Druid, a seeker of the old ways, and one who sees value in and of Tree Dryads, within and around Earth Mother, before and beyond Time Father. I wish that my path and the path I have been called to, be declared as one. As I set my foot upon this path, I promise Source of All Things, to use our Energies to bring love and light to all living things. I will study so that I gain much knowledge of those who came before me and open myself to their benign will. With this name, I [state your druid or holy name] also known as [state your civil name] become one as I strive for hospitality, courage, and vision so that I may bring bright blessings to those around me."

=== Humanism ===
While not religious, some humanist organizations offer naming ceremonies. This is available a service to provide recognition, record keeping, and a celebration without forcing any religious obligations on the family or the child. The ceremony can happen anywhere, not just at city hall, where other types of non-religious naming ceremonies happen.

== See also ==
- Civil naming ceremony – Non-religious ceremony at the occasion of the birth or naming of a child
- Dies lustricus – Ancient Roman naming ceremony
- Deadnaming – Referring to a transgender person by their former name
- Nickname – Informal name of a person, place, or thing
- Name change – Legal process for someone to change their own name
- Uvulotomy – A surgery sometimes performed as part of a naming ceremony in some cultures
