= Civil naming ceremony =

Non-religious ceremony at the occasion of the birth or naming of a child

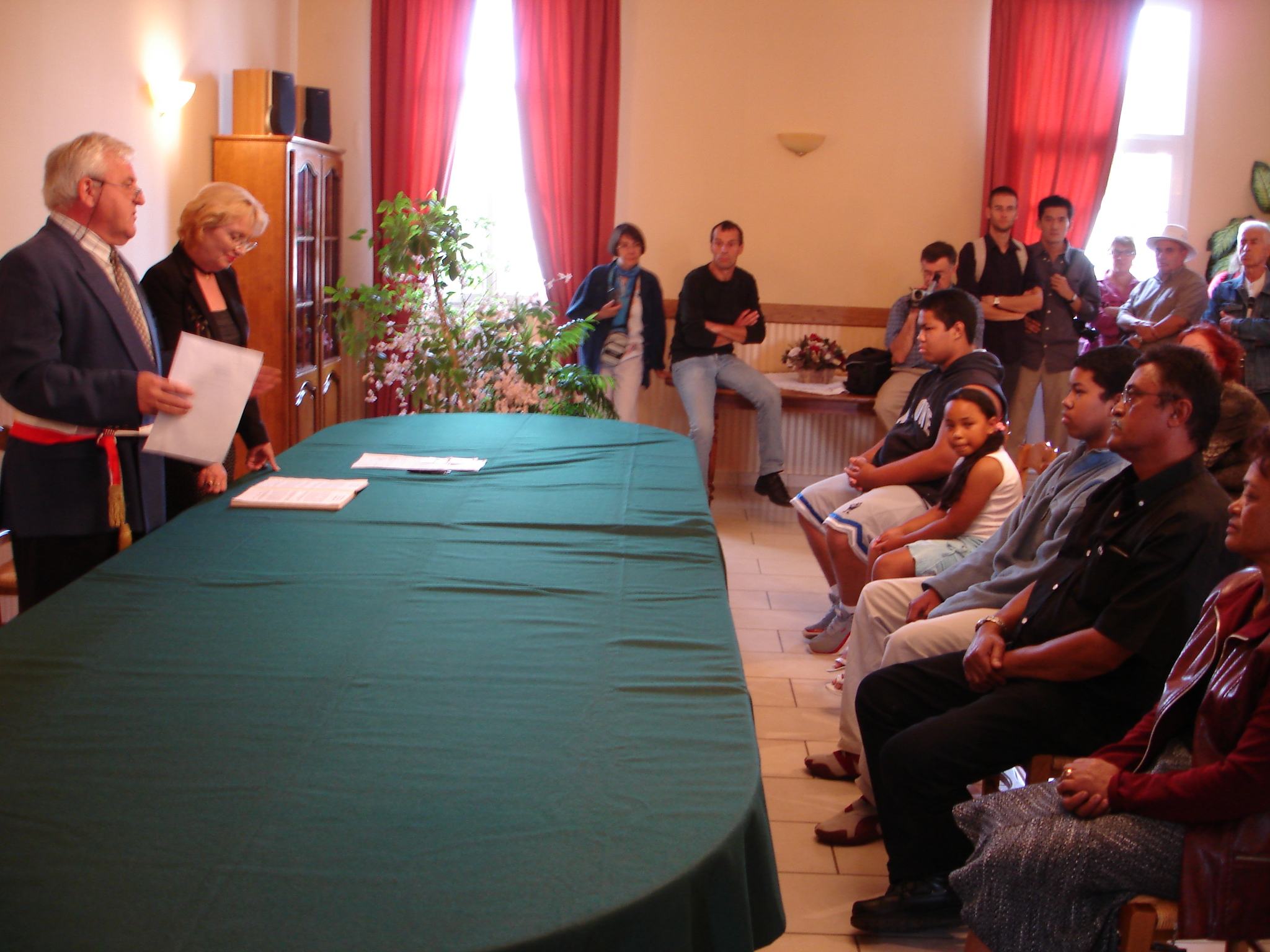
Civil baptism of a family of undocumented migrants in 2006, at the Belleu town hall. (Aisne).

A civil naming ceremony is a non-religious ceremony symbolising the entry of a newborn into society. It is performed at the local registry office and contrasts with the religious baptism performed by church authorities. Civil naming ceremonies have no legal character and instead confer moral obligations to the parents and godparents.

In Continental Europe, the equivalent concept is a civil baptism at the municipal town hall.

== History ==
In France, the civil baptism (or republican baptism) originated from the Law of 20 Prairial, Year II (8 June 1794) relative to the civil status. Reserved for municipal authorities. A civil baptism can be performed on all minors aged under 13 years, but their godparents must be adults.

It fell out of practice in the 19th century, but restarted in 1892 by the socialist commune of Saint-Denis, in order to reduce the influence of religion on children. It was very popular during the Belle Époque in the north of France, before becoming rare.

== By country ==
=== United Kingdom ===
The civil naming ceremony is a ceremony practiced by local councils in the United Kingdom to provide a non-religious alternative for families. The ceremony is performed by the local civil registrar or an appointed official and a commemorative certificate is usually provided. This is a modern commercial innovation by register offices and local councils; naming ceremonies originated in the work of humanist celebrants to invent a meaningful secular alternative to religious baptisms and christenings.

Civil naming ceremonies have no legal standing and are separate from birth registration which is a legal requirement.

=== France ===
In France, republican baptisms are performed by an elected French local government official, usually the mayor at the town hall free of charge. It confers a moral obligation for godparents to look after the children in the case of a family breakdown or death.

Civil baptisms are practiced in many municipalities and is regaining popularity. In Rennes, there is on average 80 civil baptisms a year. In 2015, 181 civil baptisms were counted in Lyon, 135 in Nantes (+15%), 12 at Vesoul and 325 in Paris. In Paris, only 13 of the 20 arrondissements practice civil baptisms. The municipalities may also choose not to celebrate civil baptisms.

On 1 April 2015, Yves Daudigny proposed a law giving legal status to civil baptisms. The purpose of the bill is to create a standardised procedure throughout France and to give republican baptisms a legal framework so that "in the case of a breakdown, [parents can] be supplemented by godparents and in any case, that they will take part in contributing to the development of the indispensable qualities in a child's character which will allow him/her to become a citizen devoted to the public good, driven by the feelings of fraternity, understanding and respect for the liberty and solidarity of his/her peers." The text had its first reading at the National Assembly on 21 May 2015.

=== Spain ===
As of 2015 there is no national law regulating civil baptisms. Civil baptisms are carried out by local government officials on the will of the celebrants and confer a moral obligation.

The first municipality to celebrate civil baptisms in Spain was Igualada (Barcelona), on 7 November 2004. In 2007, the second municipality of Rivas-Vaciamadrid (Madrid) and in 2009 El Borge (Málaga) and the city of Madrid.

During the ceremony, the local government official reads the Convention on the Rights of the Child or the Spanish Constitution of 1978, particularly those related to the education, rights and fundamental liberties of the child. It is possible for the family to include complementary texts and pieces of music. The ceremony conflicts with the stamping of the citizenship card. In Rivas-Vaciamadrid, the local government official hands the family a gift and provides information on local services for children.

== See also ==
- Naming ceremony
- Civil union
- Common-law marriage
- Domestic partnership
- Civil marriage
