= Aranjanam =

Traditional South Indian girdle

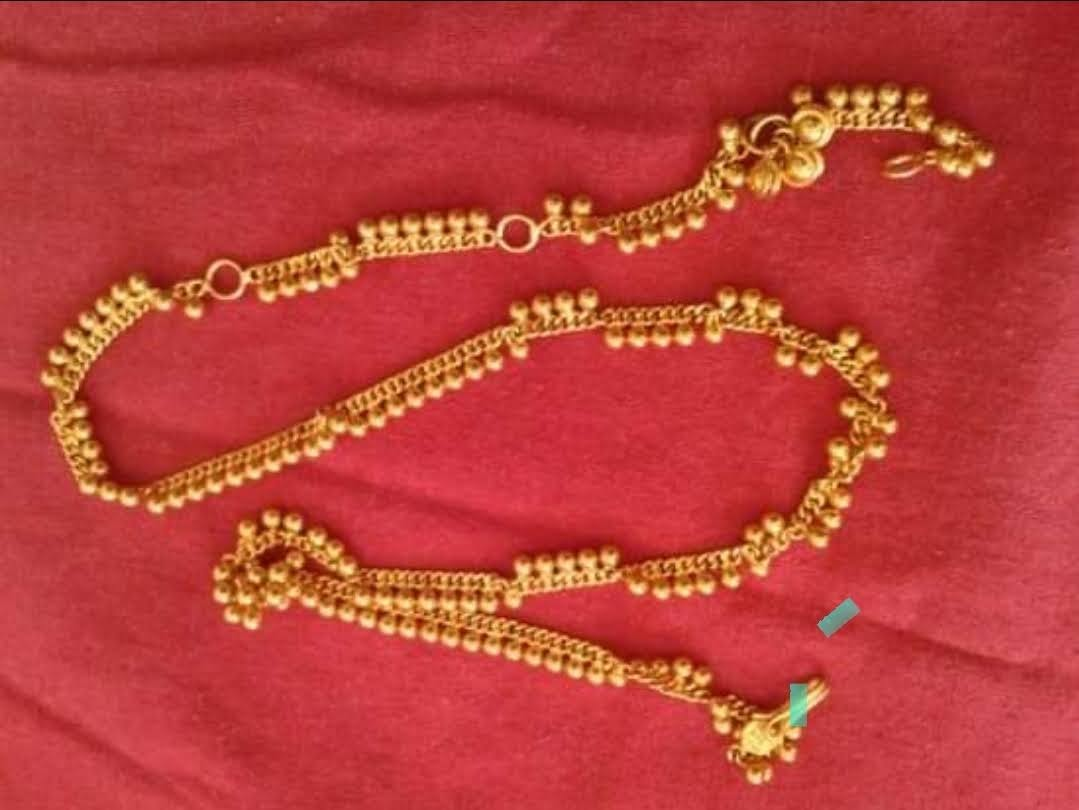
Gold Aranjanam

Aranjanam or Araijan Kodi or Molathadu (Malayalam: അരഞ്ഞാണം Tamil:அரைஞான் கயிறு Telugu: మొలతాడు) is a thin waist ornament often worn by infants and children in southern Asia, particularly in southern India, although many adults also choose to wear it. Aranjanam is usually made of gold or silver but can also be a red or black cotton thread tied around the waist. It is believed that wearing aranjanam protects against bad spirits and brings good luck. In the state of Tamil Nadu, it is known as 'Araijan Kodi' and in Kerala it is called 'Aranjana Charadu'.

It is a sacred waist thread used by Hindu men to ward off evil. It is mainly used in South India. It usually is in red or black. Tying the thread around the waist is an old tradition that has been practiced for thousands of years, and it is thought to be a symbol of protection from bad spirits.

Aranjanam is worn under one's clothes and can be used to secure cloth to the waist, for example with saris. Additionally, it is always worn even when otherwise naked due to a Hindu belief that bathing nude offends the water god, Varuna. In some cases, individuals may choose to wear a loincloth instead of their aranjanam.

Ancient Tamil people used it, mentioned in Tolkappiyam, Sangam literature describes the usage of Araijan by the words வெண்ஞான் (Venjan - made of silver) and பொன்ஞான் (Ponjan - made of gold). A village in Tamil Nadu was named after it called 'Venjan Kondaan' meaning one who wore Silver Araijan.

An Aranjanam is given to babies of both genders and all religious affiliations, particularly in south India, on the 28th day after the baby's birth, as part of a ceremony called Noolukettu in Kerala and Irupathettu in Tamil Nadu which the baby is given its name, its first jewellery, eye makeup and a meal of sweet porridge.

== Aranjana Charadu ==
Aranjana Charadu (Malayalam: അരഞ്ഞാണ ചരട് Tamil: ரைஞாண் கயிறு Telugu: మొలతాడు) is a sacred thread that tied around the waist of men, women and children. This is a traditional custom that has been followed from ages and it is believed tying the thread around the waist is the sign of protection from evil spirits. It is also believed wearing a black thread, one could stave off the evil effects, helps block evil eye and wearing red waist threads will help ward off evil effects of enemies. It also aids removal of evil effects of spirits. These traditional practice mainly being followed by Hindu and Muslim Community in South India. Metals like silver or gold are also used. It is also often seen that many women and men in south india ties the thread around their waists with an amulet (Malayalam: ഏലസ് Tamil: தாயத்து). In Tamil Nadu the thread called as Araignan Kayiru (Arana Kayiru).

Wearing a waist thread has been a long-standing tradition in India, deeply rooted in the customs and beliefs of its people. While many may associate it with warding off evil eyes, the tradition also serves a vital purpose in terms of health. In earlier times, when scientific explanations were not readily available, people relied on religious and cultural practices to maintain their well-being.

According to Indian mythology, it is believed that one must never remain nude from birth till death and wearing a thread on waist the effect of nudity on body gets nullified.

Also, in ancient people believed waist thread (Aranjana Charadu) have many health benefits such as promote growth of strong and healthy genitals prevents diseases like hernia, helps in development of healthy bones, keep weight and waist size under control by improving digestion, and improve fertility.

== Noolukettu ==
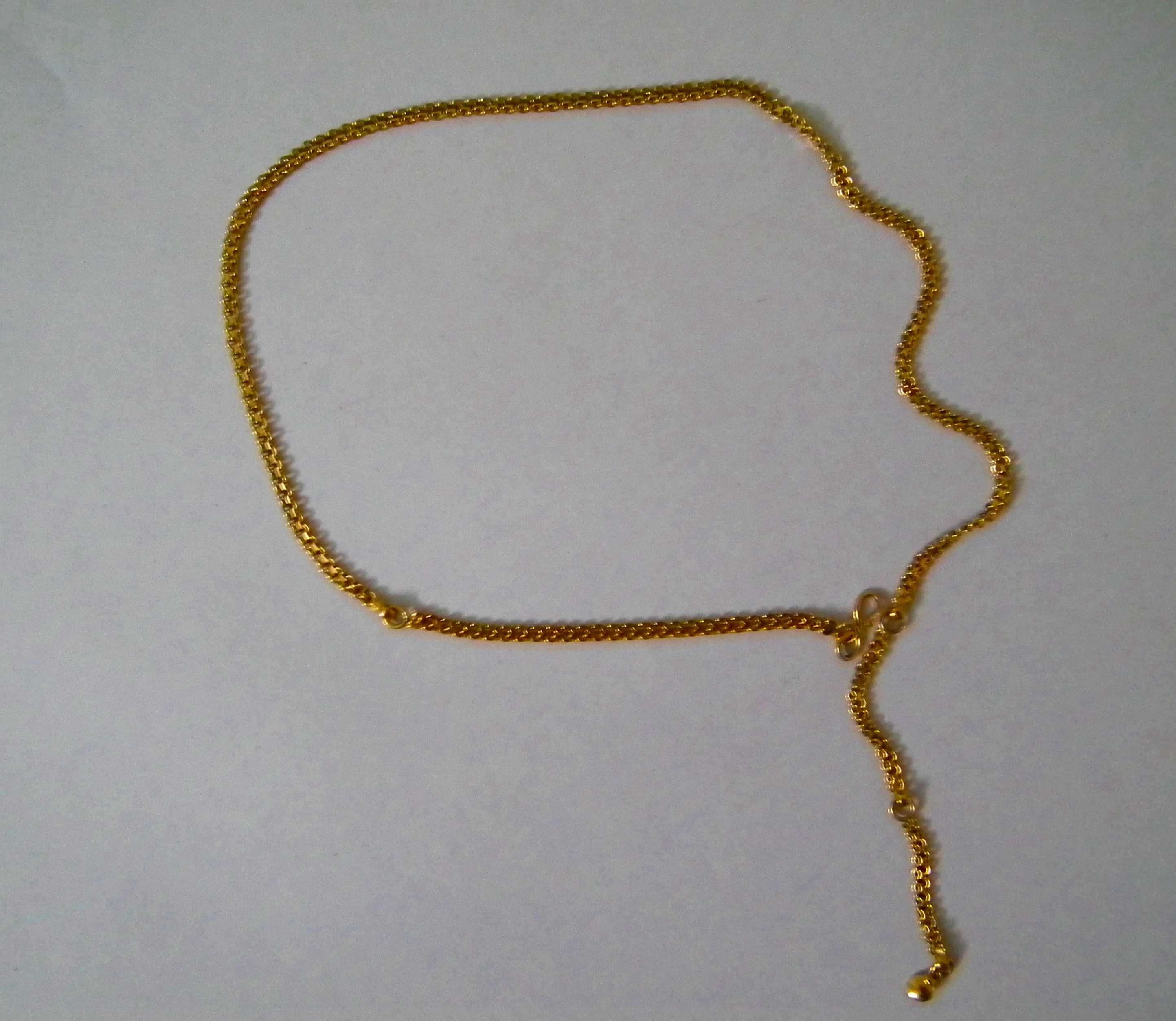
Aranjanam Kettal in Kerala

In Kerala, this ceremony is performed on the 28th day after birth of the child, as this is the first time the nakshatram (star) of the child repeats according to the Malayalam calendar. During the ceremony, charadu (thread), one in black or red cotton and the other a chain in gold are intertwined and tied around the waist of the child - this is usually done by the father of the child. This thread is called 'Aranjanam'. The child's eyes are lined with mayye or kanmashi (Kohl). A black spot is placed on one cheek or asymmetrically on the forehead, to ward off the evil eyes. The father whispers the chosen Hindu name in the child's right ear three times while the left ear is covered with a betel leaf. This is then repeated with the left ear. A mixture of ghee (melted and clarified butter) and honey is given to the infant as a base for its various foods in the future.

== See also ==
- Jewellery of Tamil Nadu
- Aranjana Charadu
