= Jewellery of Tamil Nadu =

Traditional jewelry of the Tamil people

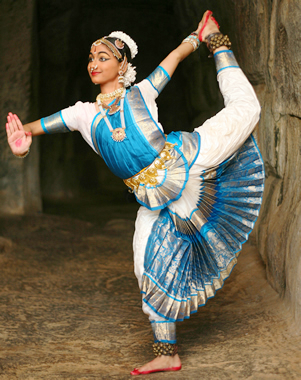
Bharathanatyam dancer with antique temple jewellery

Tamil people have historically been connoisseurs of fine golden jewellery, which has a history predating the Sangam period in the Indian subcontinent. Ancient Tamil literature lists out the different types of jewellery worn by women historically from head and every part except the feet. But some traditions have jewellery for feet too. Apart from gold, jewellery was also fashioned out of silver, copper and brass.

Tamil annai (The Mother Tamil) is praised by ornamenting her with The Five Great Epics of Tamil Literature.

- சிரமதில் திகழ்வது சீவக சிந்தாமணி - (Civaka Cintamani, jewellery on forehead)
- செவிகளில் மிளிர்வது குண்டலகேசி - (Kundalakesi, stud on ear)
- திருவே நின் இடையணி மணிமேகலையாம் - (Manimegalai, girdle on waist)
- கரமதில் மின்னுவது வளையாபதியாம் - (Valayapathi, bangle on hand)
- கால் தனில் ஒலிப்பது சிலப்பதிகாரம் - (Silappatikaram, anklet on foot)
- கண் கண்ட ஐம்பெரும் காவியத்திலகமே

== For the head ==
- Kreedam, golden crown worn by Deities and Kings, studded with precious stones and gems.
- Nethi chutti or Vagupu chutti or Chutti, Jewel for the forehead.
- Rakkodi, used in the backhead, to hold the bunch of lengthy soft hair spun and tied
- Surya & Chandra Pirai, Sun & Moon shaped ornamental jewel used to decorate their forehead.
- Jadanagam used to tie the hair band from back side.
- Pattam, tied by both bride and groom during wedding on their forehead.
- KandasaramVinthasaram and Kechaparam are tied on the braid.
- Thirugupoo, round ornament with screw like back used to wore on the backhead in the center.
- Kunjam, women ties it at the end of braid. It stimulate long hair growth.

== For the ear ==
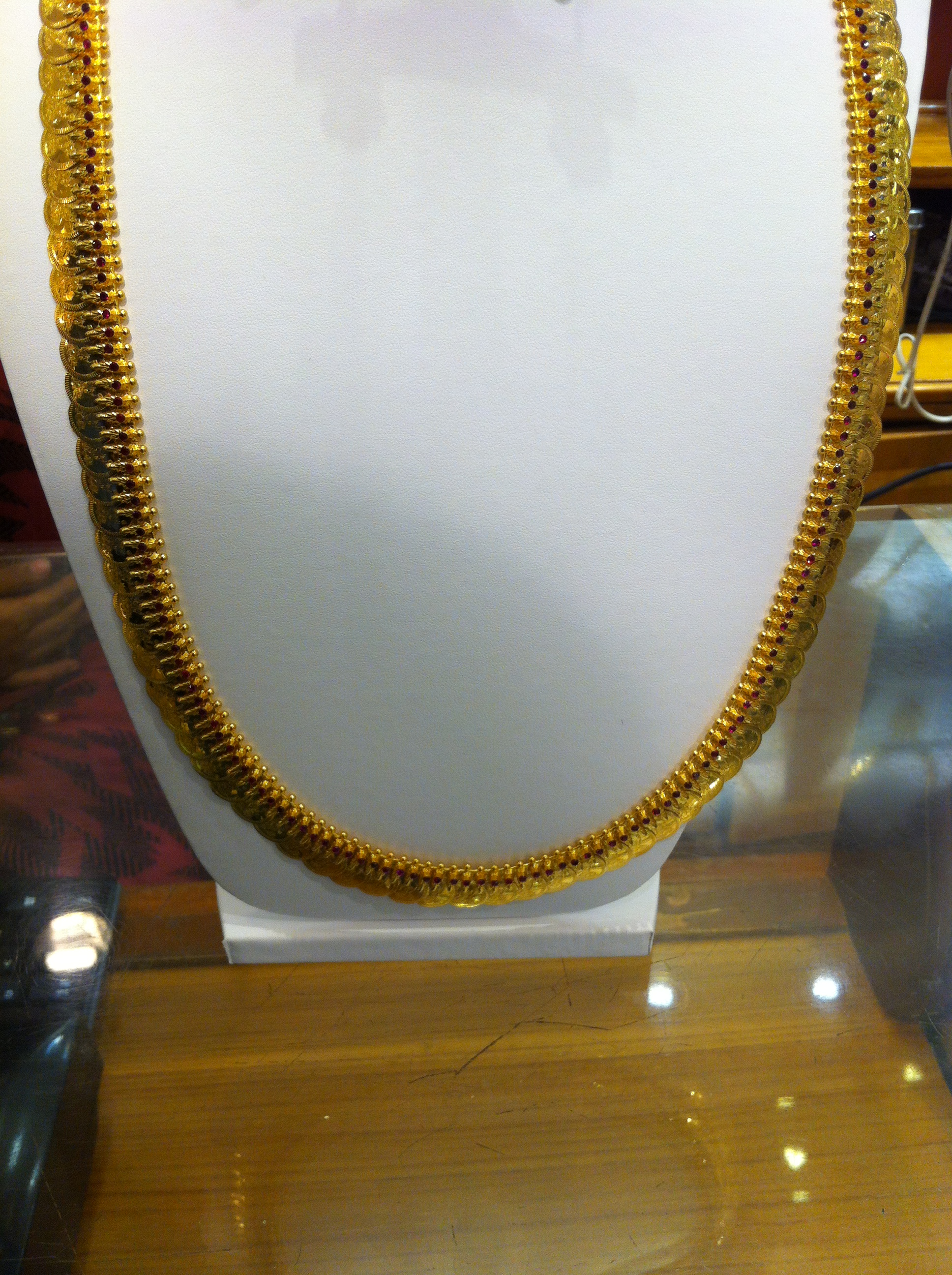
Kaasumaalai

- Thodu, ear stud or ear rings.
- Kadukkan, small stud with single stone for men.
- Olai, large ear studs.
- Pampadam, gold earring with hallow balls and squares filled with lac. Worn by old ladies with big ear hole.
- Maattal, chain shaped jewel used to hook in the hair from the ear ring stud or nose stud.
- Lolakku, a designer jewel that hung from the ear stud.
- Kundalam, ear ornament for both men and women.
- Jimikki, another ear stud.
- Makara kuzhai, fish shaped ear ornament
- Kadippu
- Karnam
- Saarpaipoo
- Thandatti
- Mudichi
- Picharkal
- Poodi

== For the nose ==
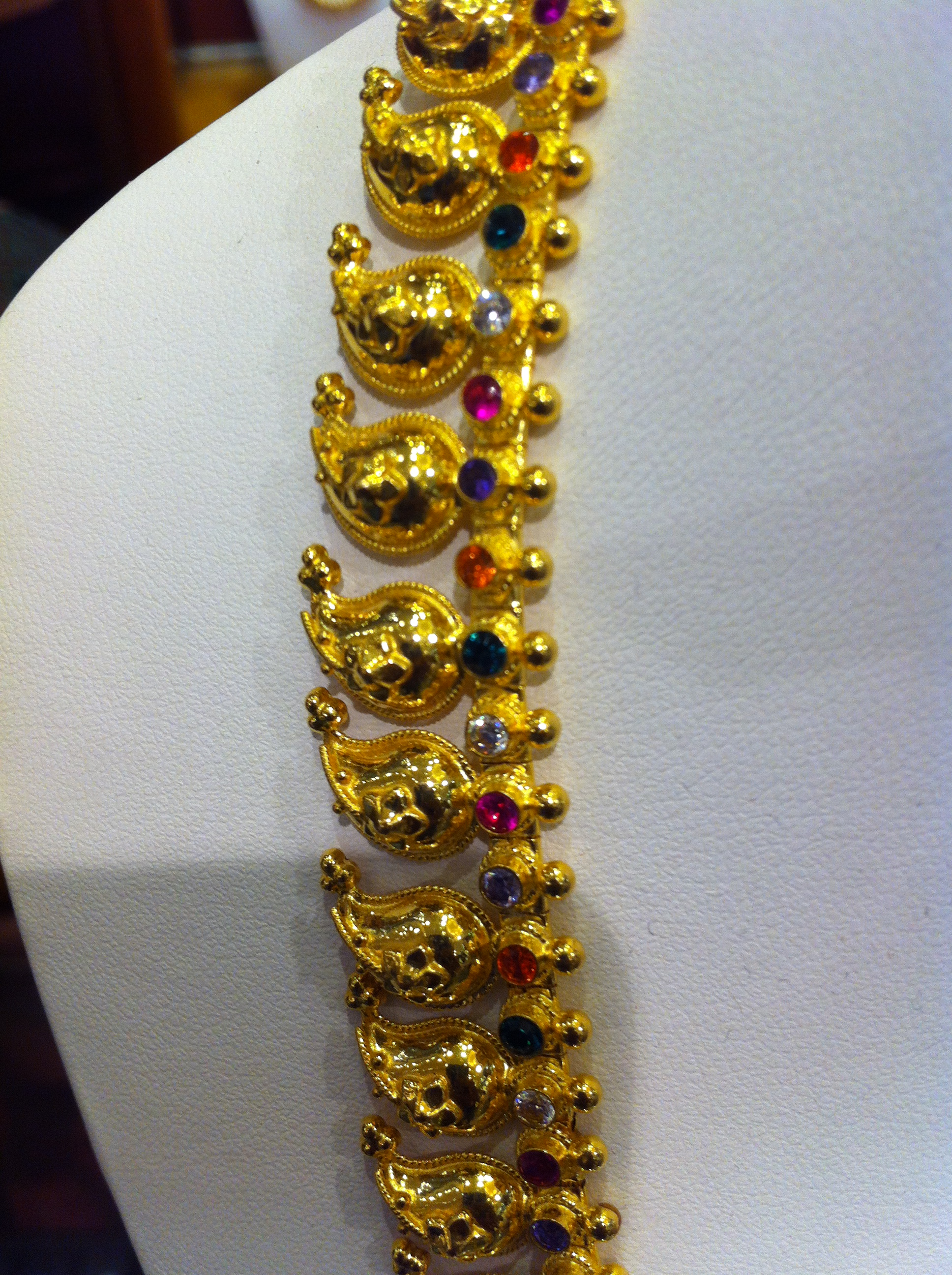
Maangamaalai

- Mookuthi, Nose stead (Mukkuthi).
- Besari, a stud in gold with stone studded Nose stud or ear stead with a hanging design.
- Bullakku, A designer jewel that hangs from the septum.
- Naththu, A nose ring adorned on the edge of either nostril

== For the neck ==
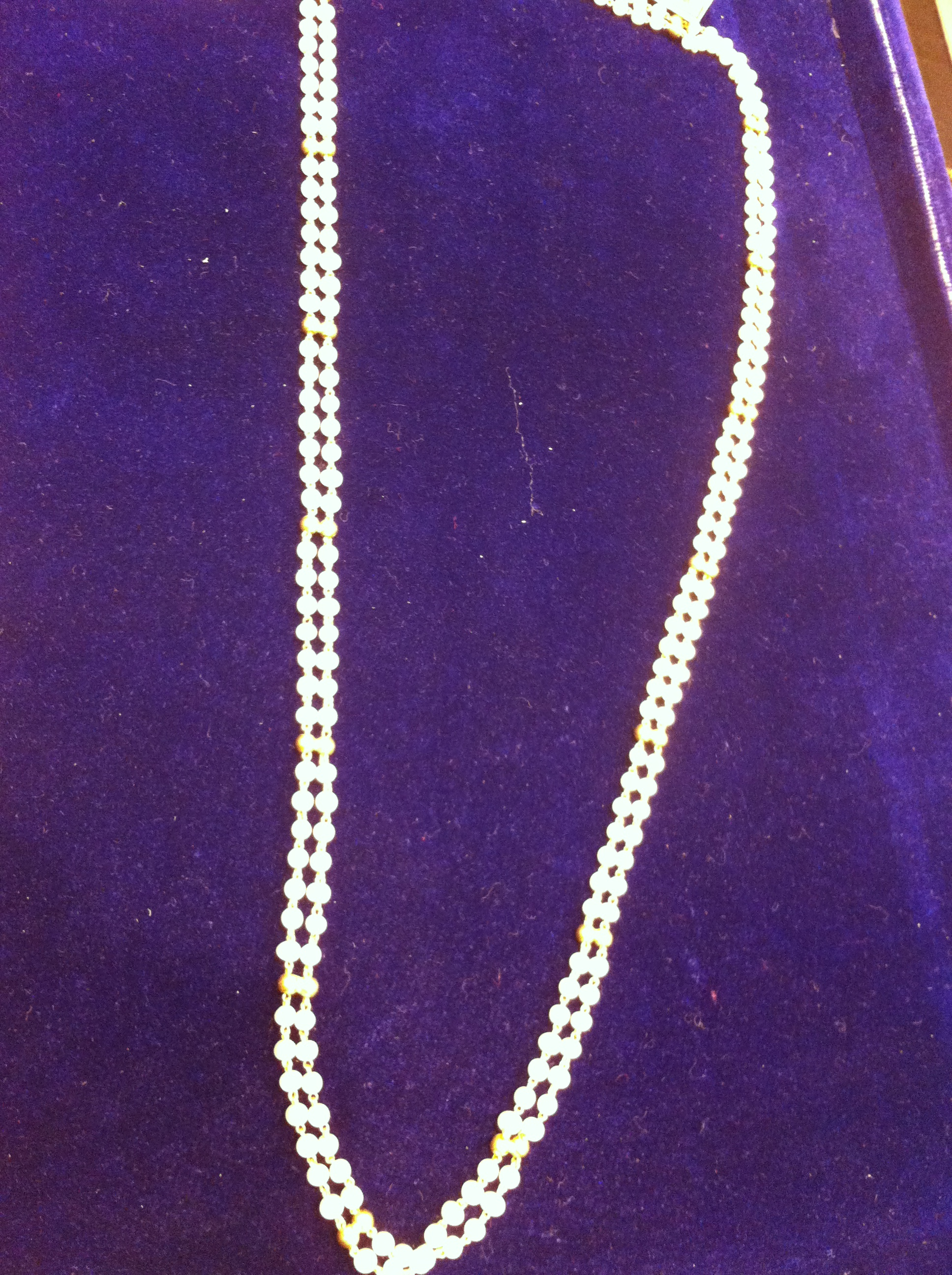
Muthumaalai or Muthucharam

- Thaali or Suthuru or Mangalyam, groom ties around bride's neck during marriage that show the bondage between them. The shape differs according to the caste.
- Attigai, necklace like ornament worn very close to neck.
- Aaram or Haram, Necklace.
- Maalai or Charam, Made of plain gold or pearls & corals.
- Kaasu Maalai, long chain made of gold coins.
- Maanga Maalai, long chain designed like mango(Paisley (design)) studded with stones and gems.
- Vettrilai Kovai, betel-leaf-shaped pendants on long chain.
- Kodi Maalai, a chain made in the shape of leaves and plants of soft designs in plain gold.
- Sangili, Chain made of gold only.
- Kaarai, neck ornament
- Contrakaram, moon shaped ornament for the chest. Listed out in Sangam literature 'Silapathikaram'.
- Chavadi, five layers of chain.
- Vilakku mooku a chain model
- Godumai vidhai a chain model of wheat
- Pirandai kattai a chain model of pirandai plant
- Erattai vadam Malai a type of linked two chains

== For the hands ==
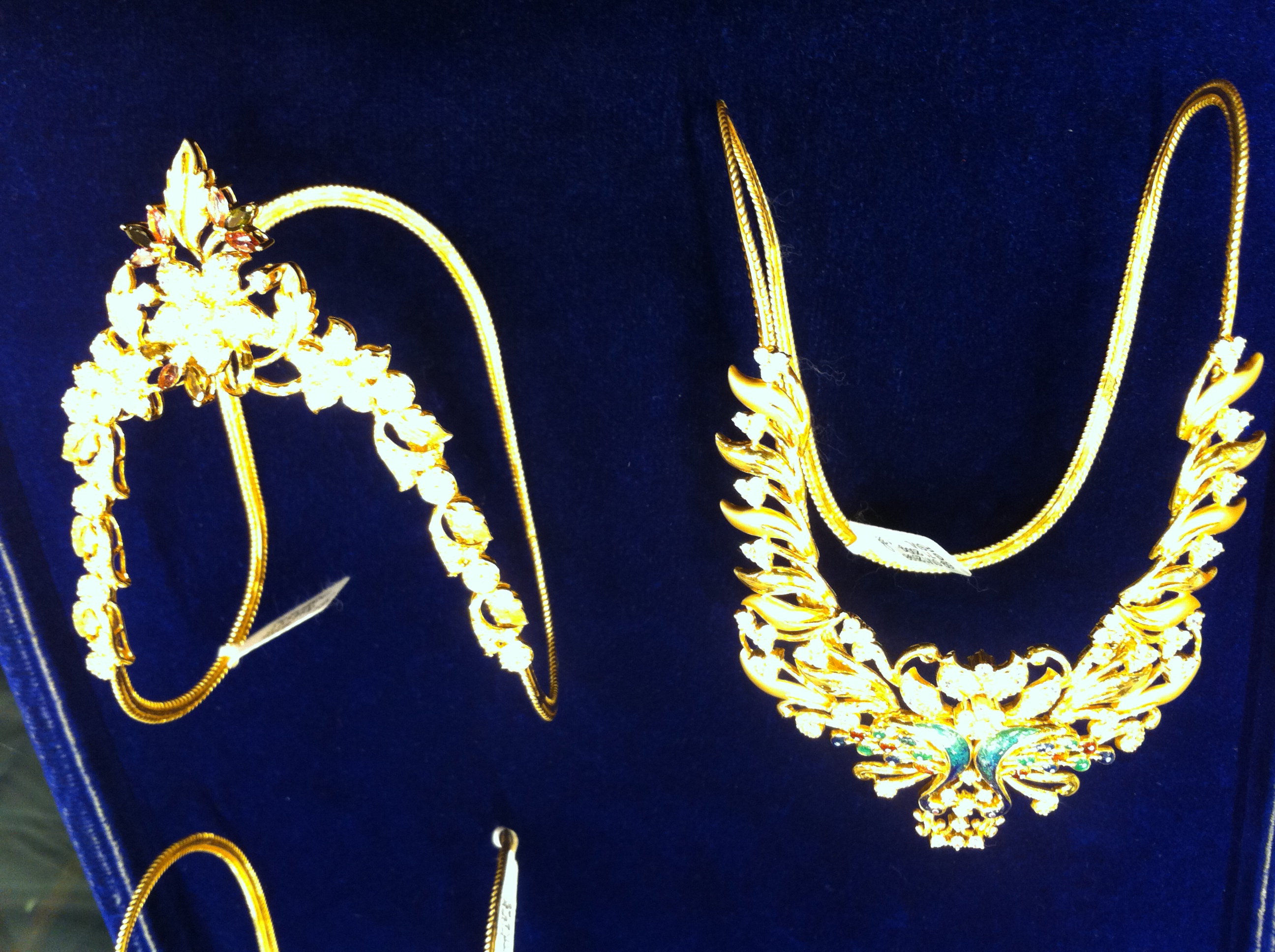
Vangi

- Valayal or Sarivu, bangles made up of plain gold or gold with stones or gems.
- Kaikappu, bangles without designs known as Kappu
- Mothiram or Neli, finger ring.
- Vangi or Vanki, armband.
- Nagothu, Naga(snake) shape on vanki.
- Kanganam (armband)
- Tholvalai Kappu used in the shoulder to hold the sari.
- Nagar or Nagam, A cobra shaped ornament used the upper arms.

== For the waist ==
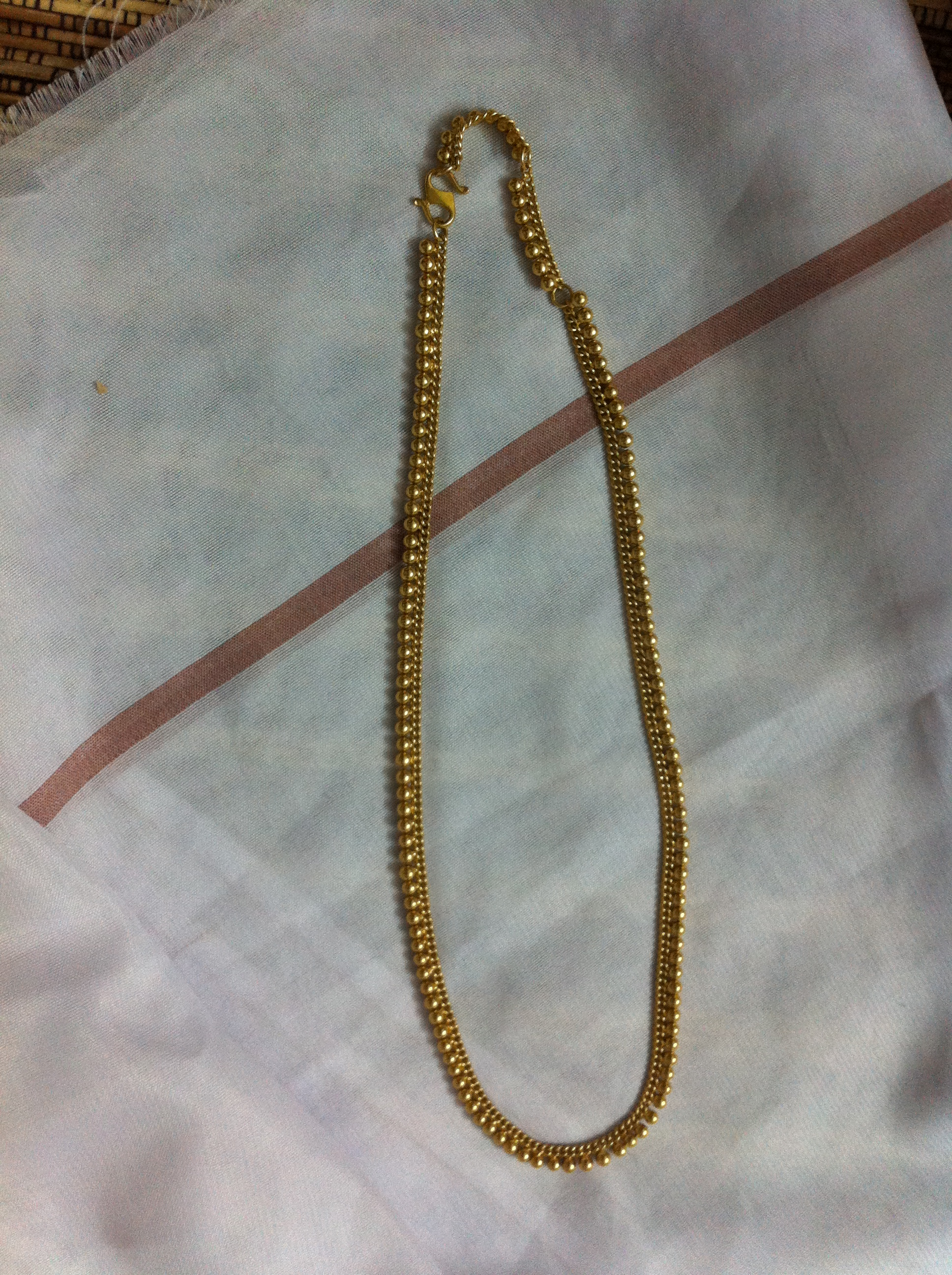
Araijan kodi or Araijanam

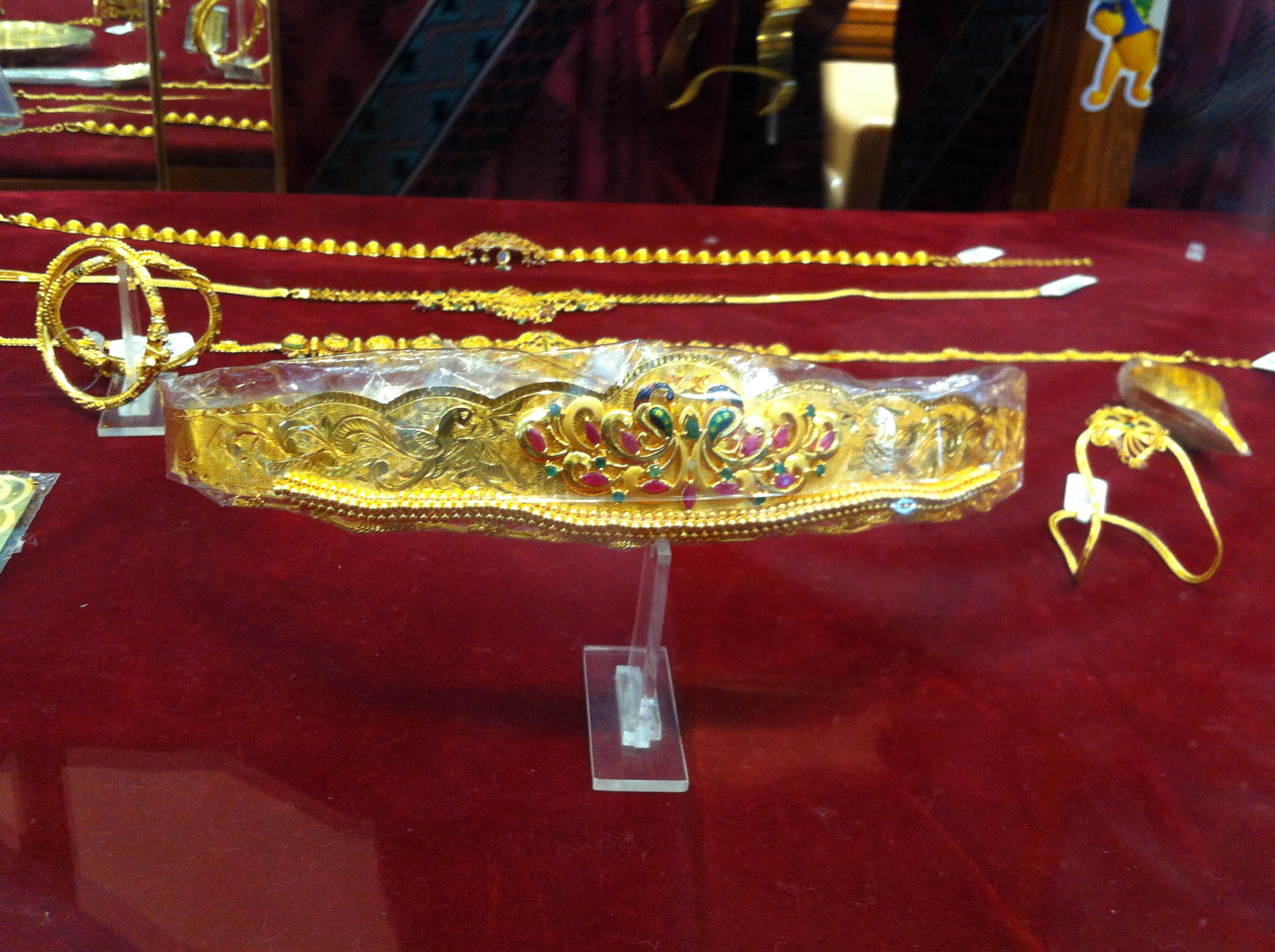
Oddiyanam

- Oddiyanam waist belt used to tighten the sari, in the hip.
- Aranaal, a chain shaped one used along with inner side of sari at hip.
- Aranjanam or Araijnan Kayiru or Araijnan Kodi, silver or gold chain for tie around the waist of infants or children and men even thick black or red thread will be used.
- Arasala (Arasa ilai), pipal or sacred fig leaf like ornament with waist chain made up of gold or silver for babies (female).

== For feet ==
Silver ornaments wore below the waist are listed below

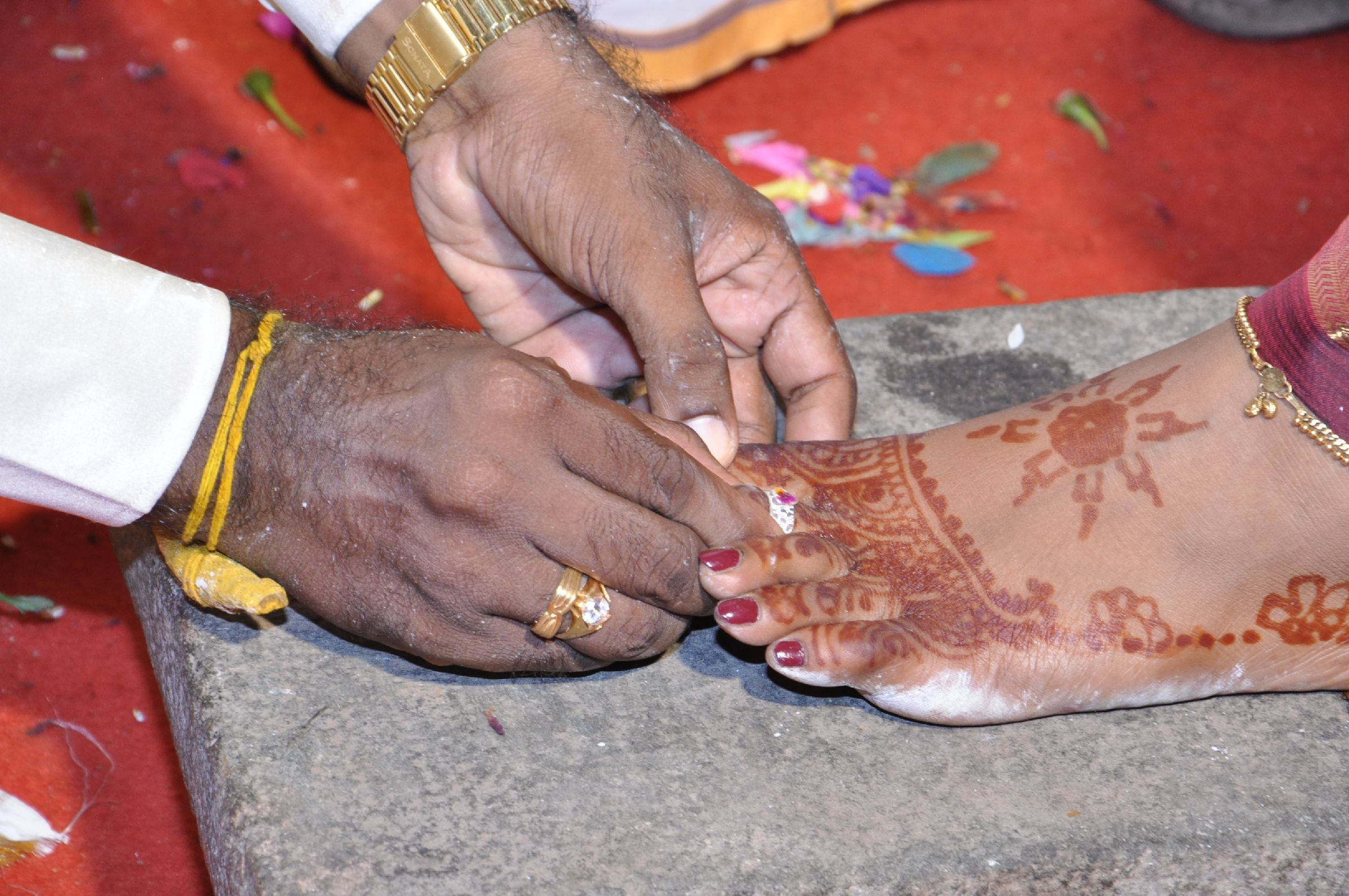
Metti or Minji ritual during Tamil wedding

- Silambu, ring shaped anklet, like hollow pipe that used to contain precious stones, silver balls, pearl or coral beads. The Sangam literature 'Silapathikaram' named after silambu.
- Sathangai or Salangai, a series of small silver bells and worn in the anklet, used by classical dancers like Bharathanatyam dancers. Listed out in Sangam literature 'Silapathikaram'.
- Metti or Minji or Peeli, grooms place it on the bride's second finger from toe during wedding.
- Kolusu (Anklet) made in silver with varieties of shape and design.
- Thandai or Pathasaram, same as Silambu but heavy.

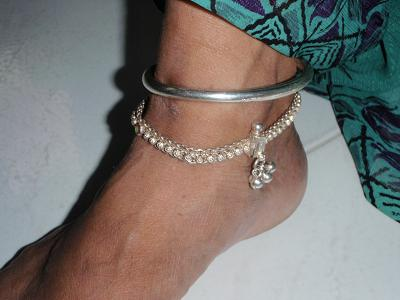
Silambu & Kolusu

- Kaappu (Plain anklets)
- Padakkam, listed out in Sangam literature 'Silapathikaram'.

== See also ==
- Tamil culture
- Tamil people
