= 1110 =

1110 in various calendars
- Gregorian calendar: 1110; MCX
- Ab urbe condita: 1863
- Armenian calendar: 559; ԹՎ ՇԾԹ
- Assyrian calendar: 5860
- Balinese saka calendar: 1031–1032
- Bengali calendar: 516–517
- Berber calendar: 2060
- English Regnal year: 10 Hen. 1 – 11 Hen. 1
- Buddhist calendar: 1654
- Burmese calendar: 472
- Byzantine calendar: 6618–6619
- Chinese calendar: 己丑年 (Earth Ox); 3807 or 3600 — to — 庚寅年 (Metal Tiger); 3808 or 3601
- Coptic calendar: 826–827
- Discordian calendar: 2276
- Ethiopian calendar: 1102–1103
- Hebrew calendar: 4870–4871
- Hindu calendars
- Vikram Samvat: 1166–1167
- Shaka Samvat: 1031–1032
- Kali Yuga: 4210–4211
- Holocene calendar: 11110
- Igbo calendar: 110–111
- Iranian calendar: 488–489
- Islamic calendar: 503–504
- Japanese calendar: Tennin 3 / Ten'ei 1 (天永元年)
- Javanese calendar: 1015–1016
- Julian calendar: 1110; MCX
- Korean calendar: 3443
- Minguo calendar: 802 before ROC 民前802年
- Nanakshahi calendar: −358
- Seleucid era: 1421/1422 AG
- Thai solar calendar: 1652–1653
- Tibetan calendar: ས་མོ་གླང་ལོ་ (female Earth-Ox); 1236 or 855 or 83 — to — ལྕགས་ཕོ་སྟག་ལོ་ (male Iron-Tiger); 1237 or 856 or 84

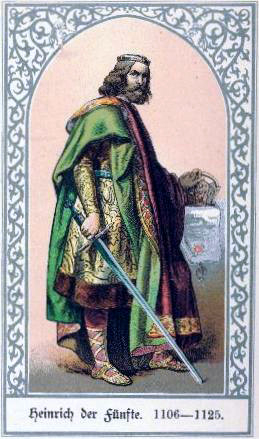
Henry V, King of Germany, marries Matilda of England

Year 1110 (MCX) was a common year starting on Saturday of the Julian calendar.

== Events ==
=== By date ===
- May 5: Lunar eclipse, in which the moon becomes totally dark (according to the Peterborough Chronicle), due to an earlier volcanic eruption putting aerosols into the upper atmosphere of the earth, thus cutting off the earthlight.

=== By place ===
==== Asia ====
- Second Chola invasion of Kalinga: The Chola emperor Kulottunga I, angered that the Kalinga king Anantavarman Chodaganga has failed to pay tribute for two consecutive years, orders a punitive expedition. He sends his general Karunakara Tondaiman (with involvement of the young prince Vikrama Chola) to lead the invasion. The Chola forces march across the rivers Palar, Pennar, Krishna, Godavari, enter Kalinga territory, defeat the elephant corps sent by Anantavarman, ravage the land, and force Anantavarman to flee.

==== Levant ====
- Spring – Mawdud ibn Altuntash, Turkic ruler (atabeg) of Mosul, leads an expedition to capture the territories of the Crusaders (belonging to the County of Edessa) east of the river Euphrates. He besieges the fortress city of Edessa, but is forced to retreat when King Baldwin I of Jerusalem (with the support of Armenian forces sent by Kogh Vasil) intervenes with a Crusader relief force.
- February–May – Crusaders under Baldwin I besiege Beirut. Genoese and Pisan ships blockade the harbour; Fatimid ships from Tyre and Sidon try in vain to break the blockade. The Fatimid governor flees by night through the Italian fleet to Cyprus. On May 13, Baldwin captures the city by assault and the Italians carry out a massacre among the inhabitants.
- October–December – Crusaders under Baldwin I (supported by King Sigurd I of Norway) besiege Sidon. Norwegian ships blockade the harbour, but are nearly dispersed by a powerful Fatimid flotilla from Tyre. They are saved by the arrival of a Venetian squadron under Doge Ordelafo Faliero. On December 4, the city capitulates (under notable terms) to Baldwin.
- December – Tancred, Italo-Norman prince of Galilee, brings the Crusader castle Krak des Chevaliers in Syria under his control. He remains regent of the Principality of Antioch in the name of his cousin Bohemond II.

==== Europe ====
- Henry V, King of Germany, invades Italy with a large army and concludes an agreement with Pope Paschal II at Sutri. Henry renounces the right of investiture (a dispute with the former Henry IV). In return, Paschal promises to crown him emperor and to restore to the Holy Roman Empire all the lands given to the German church (since the time of Charlemagne).
- July 25 – Henry V marries 8-year-old Matilda (daughter of King Henry I of England). She is crowned Queen of the Romans in a ceremony at Mainz. After the betrothal Matilda is placed into custody of Bruno, archbishop of Trier, who is tasked with educating her in German culture, manners and government.
- The dukedom of Bohemia is secured for Vladislaus I following the death of Svatopluk ("the Lion") who is assassinated. Vladislaus receives support from Henry V and will rule until 1125.
- Almoravid forces under Sultan Ali ibn Yusuf occupy Zaragoza (modern Spain), bringing all of Andalusia's Muslim states under Almoravid control.

==== England ====
- King Henry I has improvements made at Windsor Castle, including a chapel, so that he can use the castle as his formal residence.

=== By topic ===
==== Literature ====
- The Rus' Primary Chronicle is completed. The work is considered to be a fundamental source in the history of the East Slavs.
- Approximate date of composition of Jayamkondar's Kalingattuparani, a Tamil epic celebrating the victory of Kulottunga Chola I over the Kalinga king Anantavarman Chodaganga in the Chola invasion of Kalinga that takes place around this year.

==== Religion ====
- Construction begins on Fontevraud Abbey in the French duchy of Anjou.

== Births ==
- Aelred of Rievaulx, English Cistercian monk and abbot (d. 1167)
- Abraham ben Isaac of Narbonne, Jewish rabbi and writer (approximate date)
- Abraham ibn Daud, Jewish astronomer and historian (d. 1180)
- Walter fitz Alan, Scottish High Steward (approximate date)
- Clarembald of Arras, French theologian and writer (d. 1187)
- Diarmait Mac Murchada, Irish king of Leinster (d. 1171)
- Düsum Khyenpa, Tibetan spiritual leader (karmapa) (d. 1193)
- Odo of Deuil (or Eudes), French abbot and historian (d. 1162)
- Gertrude of Sulzbach, German queen (approximate date)
- Gilbert Foliot, English abbot and bishop (approximate date)
- Hodierna of Jerusalem, countess of Tripoli (approximate date)
- Iorwerth Goch ap Maredudd, Welsh prince (approximate date)
- John Tzetzes, Byzantine grammarian (approximate date)
- Kirik the Novgorodian, Russian monk and chronicler (d. 1156)
- Lhachen Naglug, Indian ruler of Ladakh (approximate date)
- Liu Wansu, Chinese physician of the Jin dynasty (d. 1200)
- Odo de St Amand (or Eudes), French Grand Master of the Knights Templar (d. 1179)
- Phagmo Drupa Dorje Gyalpo, Tibetan Buddhist monk (d. 1170)
- Reginald de Dunstanville, 1st Earl of Cornwall (d. 1175)
- Robert of Torigni, Norman monk and abbot (d. 1186)
- Rohese de Vere, countess of Essex (approximate date)
- Rostislav I, Grand Prince of Kiev (approximate date)
- Vladislaus II (or Vladislav), king of Bohemia (d. 1174)
- William III ("the Child"), count of Burgundy (d. 1127)

== Deaths ==
- July 10 – Elias I of Maine (de Baugency), French nobleman
- November 12 – Gebhard III, bishop of Constance
- Lhachen Utpala, Indian king of Ladakh (b. 1080)
- Li Jie, Chinese writer of the Song dynasty (b. 1065)
- Richard of Hauteville, Italo-Norman nobleman
- Robert Scalio of Hauteville, Italo-Norman nobleman
- Thiofrid, Benedictine abbot of Echternach
- Vijayabahu I, Sri Lankan king of Polonnaruwa
- William Bona Anima, archbishop of Rouen
