= Thakkayagapparani =

12th-century Tamil paraṇi poem by Ottakoothar

Thakkayagap Parani
- Author: Oṭṭakkūttar
- Original title: தக்கயாகப் பரணி
- Language: Tamil
- Subject: Destruction of Daksha's sacrifice by Virabhadra
- Genre: Paraṇi, 96 minor literature
- Published: 12th century
- Publication place: India

Thakkayagap Parani (தக்கயாகப் பரணி; Takkayākap Paraṇi) is a 12th-century Tamil paraṇi by the Chola court poet Oṭṭakkūttar. Written under Rajaraja II, it turns the destruction of Daksha's sacrifice into heroic war poetry, with Virabhadra leading Shiva's hosts against those who support the rite.

== Name and subject ==
Virabhadra destroying Daksha's sacrifice, the central episode of Thakkayagap Parani.

Paraṇi poems conventionally take the name of the defeated enemy rather than the victor. The title therefore recalls Daksha (Tamil: Takkan) and his yāga, or sacrifice. After Daksha excludes Shiva from the rite, Virabhadra is sent to destroy it and defeat the gods who aid him.

=== Linguistic note ===
The title also reflects the Tamilisation of northern words described in the Tolkāppiyam, which permits vaṭacol (வடசொல், northern word) after sounds foreign to Tamil have been adapted to its phonology. Thus Sanskrit Dakṣa becomes Tamil Takkaṉ (தக்கன்), with the cluster kṣ simplified to kk and the Tamil masculine ending -aṉ added. Comparable simplification also occurred in the development of Sanskrit into the Prakrits, where complex consonant clusters were frequently assimilated or reduced.

== Place in Tamil literature ==
Paraṇi belongs to the Tamil ciṟṟilakkiyam or minor literary genres. Later tradition commonly speaks of ninety-six such forms, although the surviving grammatical works give differing totals. The genre conventionally praises a victor who has overcome a thousand elephants and developed a distinctive imagery of battle, wilderness, Kali and hungry spirits. Jayamkondar's Kalingattuparani exemplifies the martial form; Oṭṭakkūttar instead applies it to a Shaiva myth.

== Author and form ==
Oṭṭakkūttar served Vikrama Chola, Kulottunga II and Rajaraja II and composed the three royal ulā poems later called the Mūvarulā. Thakkayagap Parani contains 814 tāḻicai (தாழிசை) in eleven divisions, from the invocation and kaṭaittiṟappu to the concluding benediction. U. V. Swaminatha Iyer noted departures from ordinary paraṇi practice, including praise of the royal patron and the use of Shaiva and Yamala traditions. His 1930 edition was prepared from several manuscripts and supplied an introduction, commentary and textual notes.

== See also ==
- Parani
- Kalingattuparani
- Ottakoothar
