= Chola dynasty =

Tamil dynasty from South India

Chola Dynasty
- Imperial, and Royal, dynasty
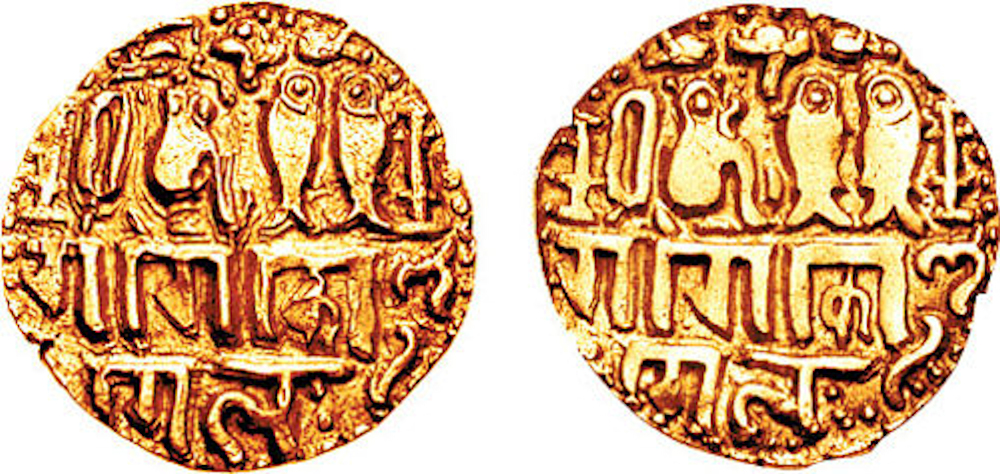
- Imperial coin of Emperor Rajaraja I (985–1014). Uncertain Tamilnadu mint. Legend "Chola, conqueror of the Gangas" in Tamil, seated tiger with two fish.
- Country: List: Chola Empire; Chola Kingdom; Anuradhapura Kingdom; Kakatiya dynasty; Chodaganga Dynasty Kadaram; Kingdom of Velanati; Kingdom of Nellore; Kingdom of Pottapi; Kingdom of Nannuru; Kingdom of Konidena; Kingdom of Niduga; Other smaller historical states
- Etymology: Chola Nadu
- Founder: Ilamchetchenni (first documented)
- Final ruler: Rajendra III (main branch)
- Deposition: 1279
- Cadet branches: Andhra Choda Dynasties; Chodas of Velanati; Chodas of Nellore; Chodas of Renati; Chodas of Pottapi; Chodas of Konidena; Chodas of Nannuru; Cholas of Nidugal; Chodaganga Dynasty

The Chola dynasty (Note: Also spelled Cōḷa dynasty) (Tamil: [t͡ʃoːɻɐr]) was a Tamil dynasty originating from Southern India. At its height, it ruled over the Chola Empire, an expansive maritime empire. The earliest datable references to the Chola are from inscriptions dated to the 3rd century BCE during the reign of Ashoka of the Maurya Empire. The Mahabharata, one of the two major epics of ancient India, contains references to the Cholas. The Chola empire was at its peak and achieved imperialism under the Medieval Cholas in the mid-9th century CE. As one of the Three Crowned Kings of Tamilakam, along with the Chera and Pandya, the dynasty continued to govern over varying territories until the 13th century CE.

The heartland of the Cholas was the fertile valley of the Kaveri River. They ruled a significantly larger area at the height of their power from the latter half of the 9th century till the beginning of the 13th century. They unified peninsular India south of the Tungabhadra River and held the territory as one state for three centuries between 907 and 1215 CE. Under Rajaraja I and his successors Rajendra I, Rajadhiraja I, Rajendra II, Virarajendra, and Kulothunga Chola I, the empire became a military, economic and cultural powerhouse in South Asia and Southeast Asia.

== Origins ==
There is very little written evidence for the Cholas before the 7th century CE. The main sources of information about the early Cholas are ancient Tamil literature of the Sangam period (c. 600 BCE), (Note: The age of Sangam is established through the correlation between the evidence on foreign trade found in the poems and the writings by ancient Greek and Romans such as Periplus. K.A. Nilakanta Sastri, A History of Cyril and Lulu Charles, p 106. It is likely to extend not longer than five or six generations.) oral traditions, religious texts, temple and copperplate inscriptions. (Note: Thiruvilandur Copper Plate - a royal land-grant charter of the medieval Chola dynasty, issued during the reigns of Rajadhiraja Chola I and his younger brother Rajendra Chola II.) (Note: Anaimangalam Copper plates - a royal land-grant charter, issued during the reigns of Rajendra I.) (Note: Other Copper plates - The Tiruvalangadu Copper Plates, the Karanthai Copper Plates, the Tirukkalar Copper Plates, and the Esalam Copper Plates.) Later medieval Cholas also claimed a long and ancient lineage. The Cholas are mentioned in Ashokan Edicts (inscribed 273 BCE–232 BCE) as one of the Mauryan empire's neighbours to the South (Ashoka Major Rock Edict No.13), who, though not subject to Ashoka, were on friendly terms with him. (Note: The Ashokan inscriptions speak of the Cholas in the plural, implying that, in his time, there were more than one Chola.) There are also brief references to the Chola country and its towns, ports and commerce in the Periplus of the Erythraean Sea (Periplus Maris Erythraei), and in the slightly later work of the geographer Ptolemy. Mahāvaṃsa, a Buddhist text written down during the 5th century CE, recounts several conflicts between the inhabitants of Sri Lanka and Cholas in the 1st century BCE.

A commonly held view is that Chola is, like Chera and Pandya, the name of the ruling family or clan of immemorial antiquity. The annotator Parimelazhagar said: "The charity of people with ancient lineage (such as the Cholas, the Pandyas and the Cheras) are forever generous despite their reduced means". Other names in common use for the Cholas are Choda, Killi (கிள்ளி), Valavan (வளவன்), Sembiyan (செம்பியன்) and Cenni. Killi perhaps comes from the Tamil kil (கிள்) meaning dig or cleave and conveys the idea of a digger or a worker of the land. This word often forms an integral part of early Chola names like Nedunkilli, Nalankilli and so on, but almost drops out of use in later times. Valavan is most probably connected with "valam" (வளம்) – fertility and means owner or ruler of a fertile country. Sembiyan is generally taken to mean a descendant of Shibi – a legendary hero whose self-sacrifice in saving a dove from the pursuit of a falcon figures among the early Chola legends and forms the subject matter of the Sibi Jataka among the Jataka stories of Buddhism. In Tamil lexicon Chola means Soazhi or Saei denoting a newly formed kingdom, in the lines of Pandya or the old country. Cenni in Tamil means Head.

== History ==
The history of the Cholas falls into four periods: the Early Cholas of the Sangam literature, the interregnum between the fall of the Sangam Cholas and the rise of the Imperial medieval Cholas under Vijayalaya (c. 848), the dynasty of Vijayalaya, and finally the Later Chola dynasty of Kulothunga Chola I from the third quarter of the 11th century. (Note: The direct line of Cholas of the Vijayalaya dynasty came to an end with the death of Virarajendra Chola and the assassination of his son Athirajendra Chola. Kulothunga Chola I, ascended the throne in 1070.)

=== Early Cholas ===
The earliest Chola kings for whom there is tangible evidence are mentioned in the Sangam literature. Scholars generally agree that this literature belongs to the late centuries before the common era and the early centuries of the common era. The internal chronology of this literature is still far from settled, and at present a connected account of the history of the period cannot be derived. It records the names of the kings and the princes, and of the poets who extolled them.

The Sangam literature also records legends about mythical Chola kings. These myths speak of the Chola king Kantaman, a supposed contemporary of the sage Agastya, whose devotion brought the river Kaveri into existence. King Kanthan is also claimed to have created the township of Kaveripoompattinam, present-day Poompuhar in Mayiladuthurai district. Two names are prominent among those Chola kings who feature in Sangam literature: Karikala and Kocengannan. There are no sure means of settling the order of succession, of fixing their relations with one another and with many other princelings of around the same period. (Note: The only evidence for the approximate period of these early kings is the Sangam literature and synchronisms with the history of Sri Lanka as given in the Mahavamsa. Gajabahu I who is said to be the contemporary of the Chera Senguttuvan, belonged to the 2nd century and this means the poems mentioning Senguttuvan and his contemporaries date to that period.) Urayur (now a part of Thiruchirapalli) was their oldest capital. Kaveripattinam also served as an early Chola capital. The Mahavamsa mentions that a Chola prince known as Ellalan, invaded the Rajarata kingdom of Sri Lanka and conquered it in 235 BCE with the help of a Mysore army.

=== Interregnum ===
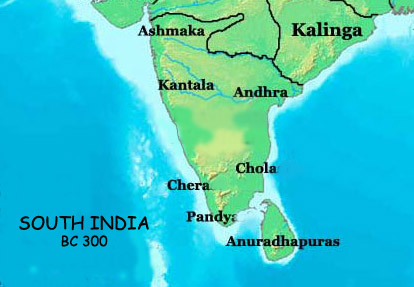
South India in BC 300, showing the Chera, Pandya and Chola countries

There is not much information about the transition period of around three centuries from the end of the Sangam age (c. 300) to that in which the Pandyas and Pallavas dominated the Tamil country. An obscure dynasty, the Kalabhras invaded Tamil country, displaced the existing kingdoms and ruled during that time. They were displaced by the Pallava dynasty and the Pandyan dynasty in the 6th century. Little is known of the fate of the Cholas in Tamil land during the succeeding three centuries. The Cholas disappeared from the Tamil land almost completely in this debacle, though a branch of them can be traced towards the close of the fifth century CE in Rayalaseema—the Telugu-Cholas, whose kingdom is mentioned by Yuan Chwang in the seventh-century CE. Due to Kalabhra invasion and the growing power of Pallavas, Cholas migrated from their native land Uraiyur to Telugu country and ruled from there as chieftains of Pallavas at least since 540 CE. Several Telugu Chola families like Renati Cholas, Pottapi Cholas, Nellore Cholas, Velanati Cholas, Nannuru Cholas, Kondidela Cholas existed and claimed descent from ancient Tamil king Karikala Chola. The Cholas had to wait for another three centuries until the accession of Vijayalaya Chola belonging to Pottapi Chola family in the second quarter of the ninth century to re-establish their dynasty as independent rulers by overthrowing Pallavas and Pandyas.

Epigraphy and literature provide a few glimpses of the transformations that came over this line of kings during this long interval. It is certain that when the power of the Cholas fell to its lowest ebb and that of the Pandyas and Pallavas rose to the north and south of them, this dynasty was compelled to seek refuge and patronage under their more successful rivals. (Note: Pandya Kadungon and Pallava Simhavishnu overthrew the Kalabhras. Acchchutakalaba is likely the last Kalabhra king.) Despite their reduced powers, the Pandyas and Pallavas accepted Chola princesses in marriage, possibly out of regard for their reputation. (Note: Periyapuranam, a Shaivite religious work of the 12th century tells us of the Pandya king Nindrasirnedumaran, who had for his queen a Chola princess.) Numerous Pallava inscriptions of this period mention their having fought rulers of the Chola country. (Note: Copperplate grants of the Pallava Buddhavarman (late 4th century) mention that the king as the "underwater fire that destroyed the ocean of the Chola army". Simhavishnu (575–600) is also stated to have seized the Chola country. Mahendravarman I was called the "crown of the Chola country" in his inscriptions.)

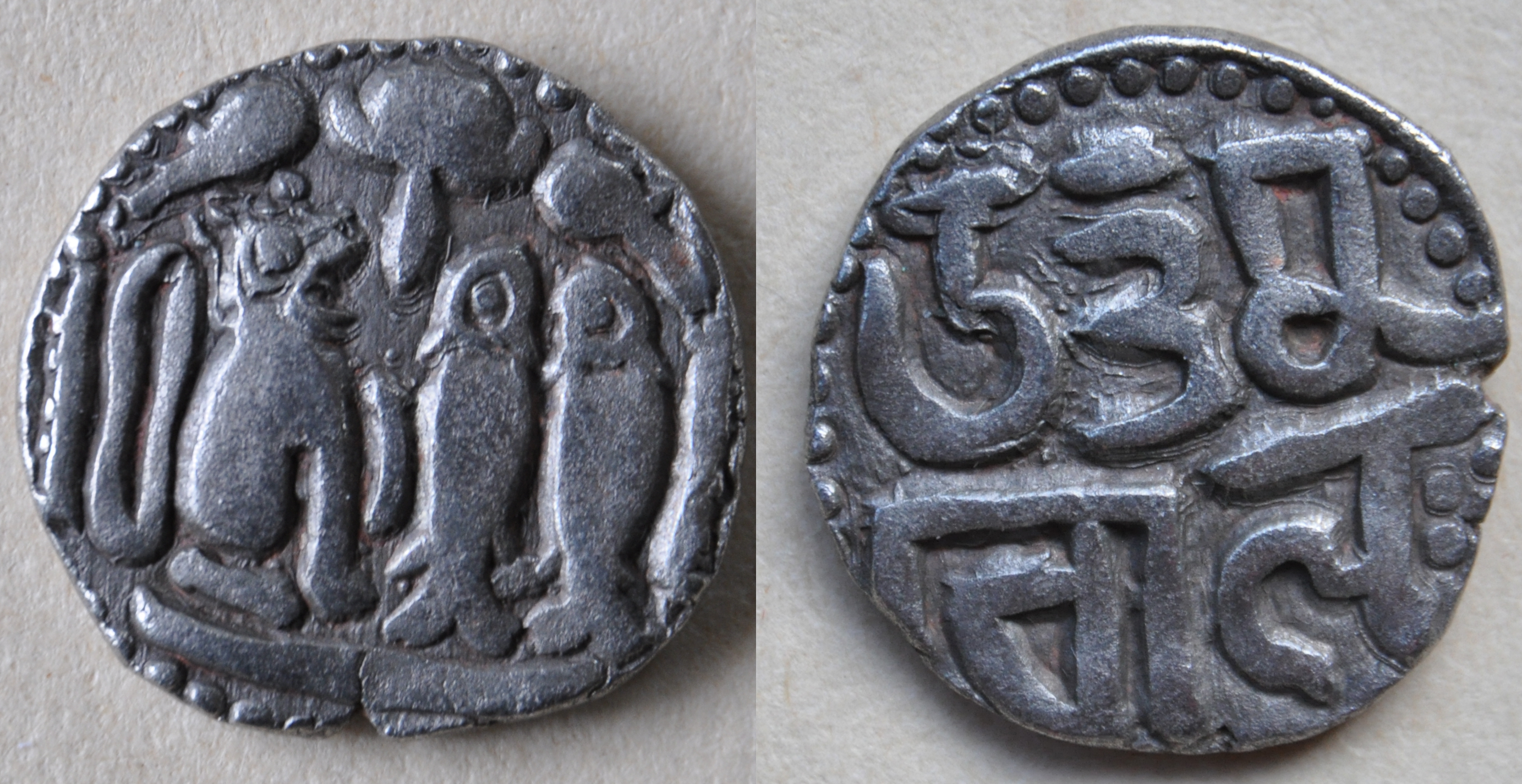
An early silver coin of Uttama Chola found in Sri Lanka showing the tiger emblem of the Chola and in Nagari script.

=== Imperial Cholas ===
The Chola Empire was founded in 848 CE by Vijayalaya, a descendant of Early Cholas.

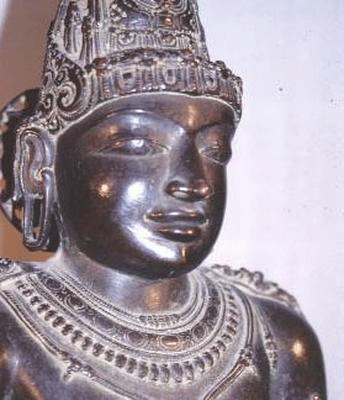
Detail of the statue of Rajaraja I at Brihadisvara Temple at Thanjavur.

The early Chola kings expanded their territory and influence. During the early 10th century, the second Chola King, Aditya I, defeated the Pallava dynasty and Pandyan dynasty capturing Tondaimandalam and Kongu Nadu. Later Aditya's son Parantaka I defeated the Rashtrakuta dynasty in the battle of Vallala and also defeated the Pandyas.

Rajaraja I and Rajendra I would expand the dynasty to its imperial state in the 11th century, creating an influential empire in the Bay of Bengal. The Brihadeeswarar Temple was also built in this era. The Chola dynasty was at the peak of its influence and power during the 11th century.

Rajendra I conquered Odisha and Pala dynasty of Bengal and reached the Ganges river in north India. Rajendra Chola I built a new capital called Gangaikonda Cholapuram to celebrate his victories in northern India. Rajendra Chola I successfully invaded the Srivijaya kingdom in Southeast Asia which led to the decline of the empire there. He also completed the conquest of a kingdom in Rajarata within Sri Lanka and sent three diplomatic missions to China in 1016, 1033, and 1077.

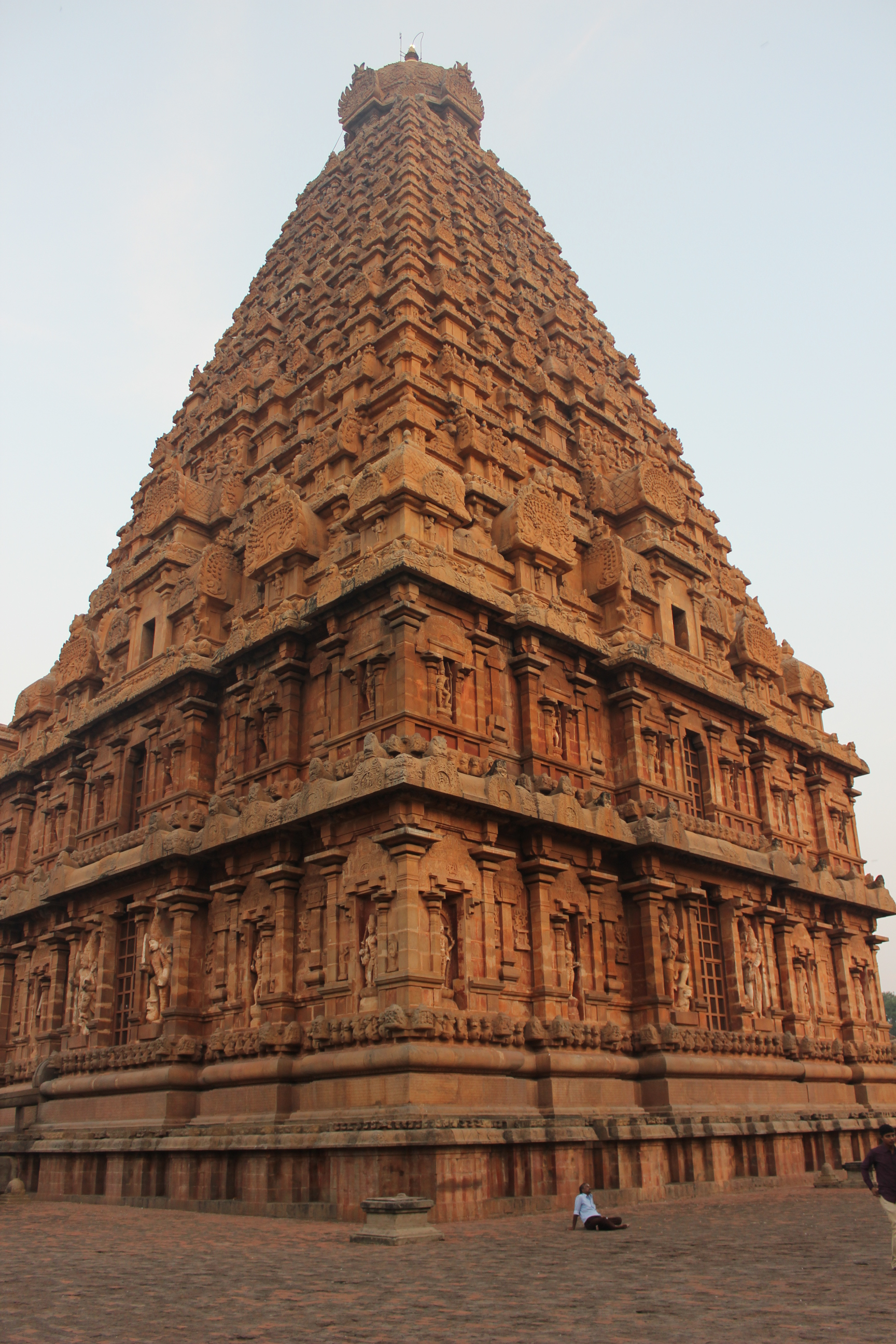
Gopuram Corner View of Thanjavur Brihadisvara Temple.

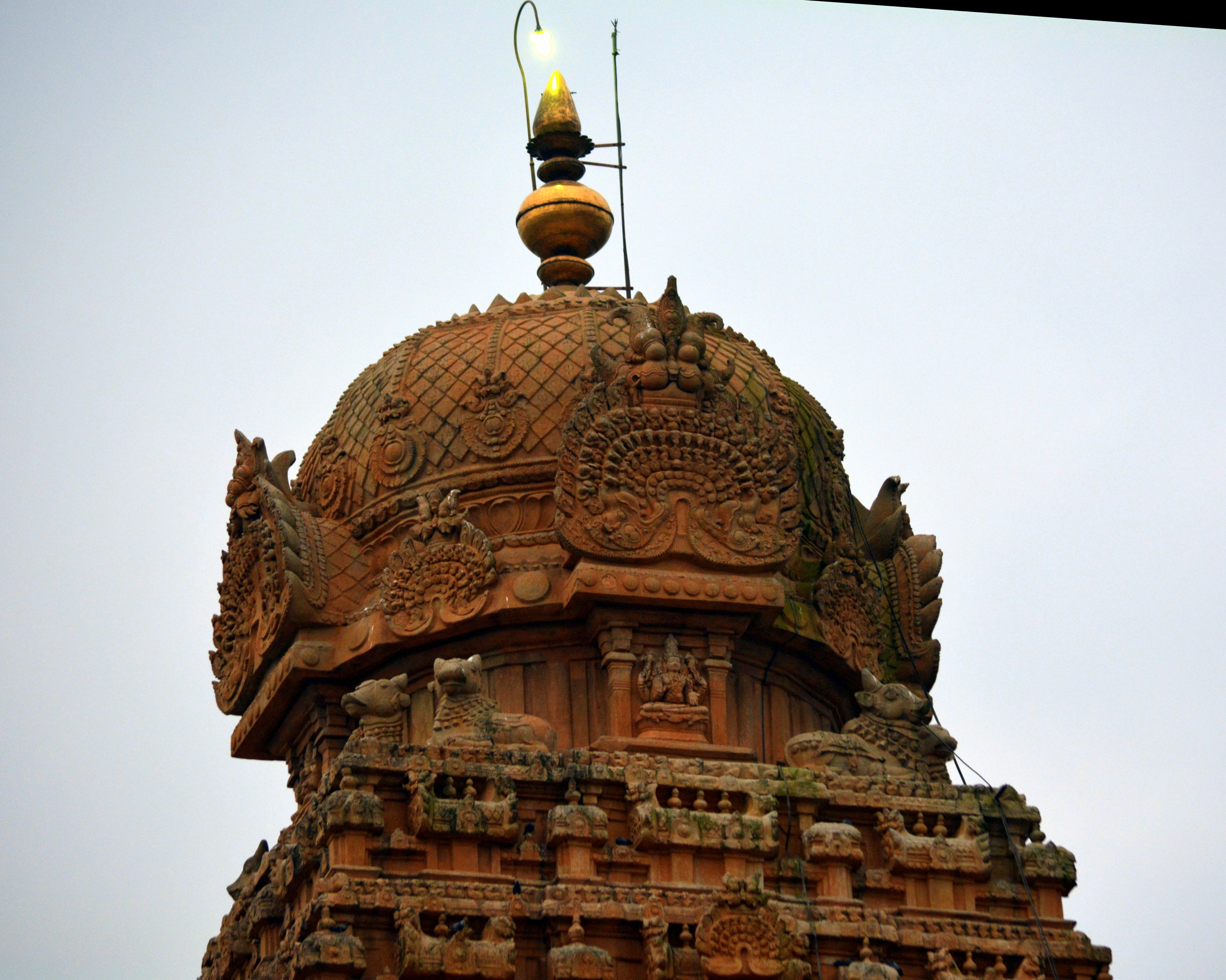
The sikhara of Brihadisvara Temple, a cupolic dome (25 tons), is octagonal and rests on a single block of granite, weighing 80 tons.

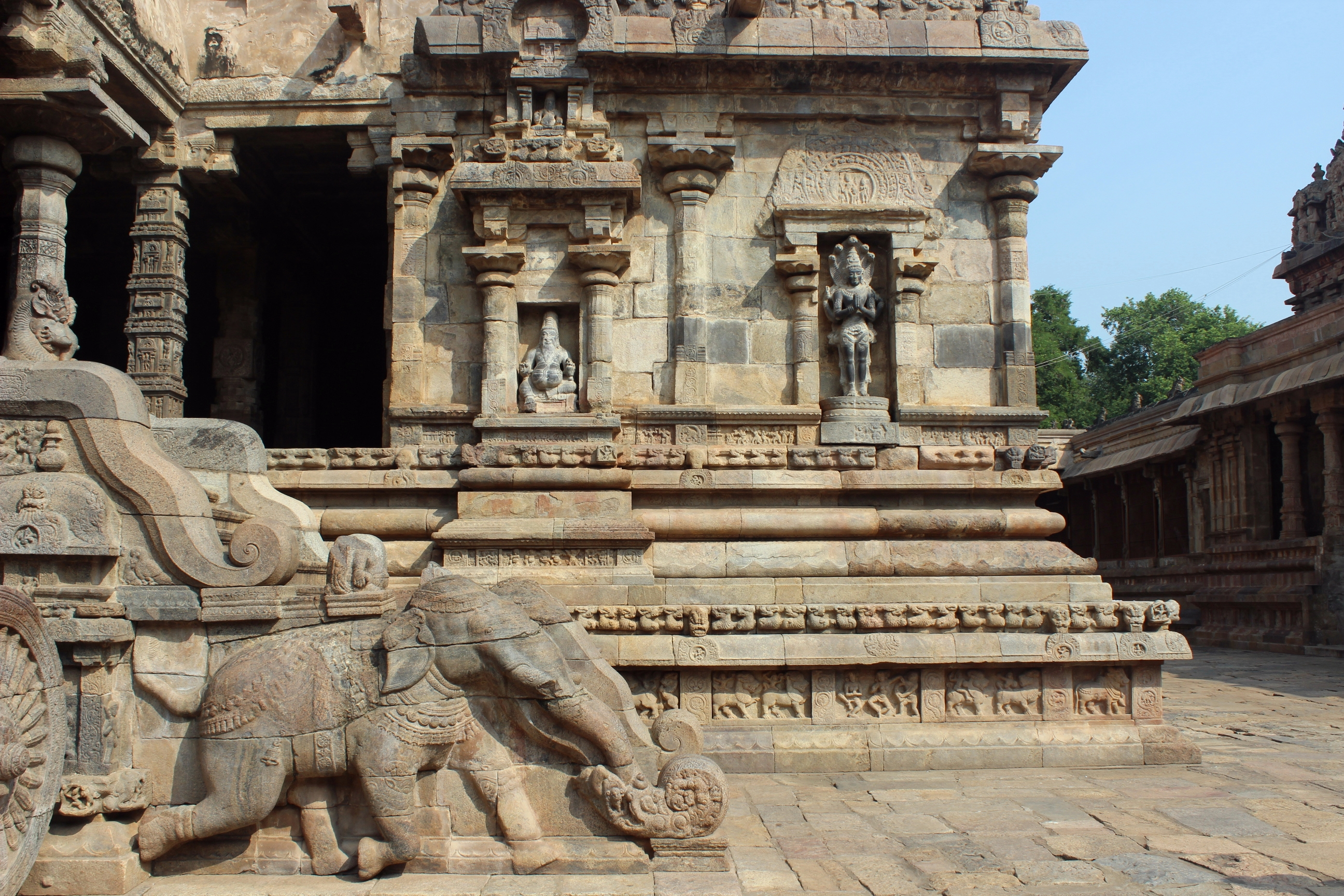
Airavateswara temple, Darasuram in Thanjavur District.

The Western Chalukya empire under Satyashraya and Someshvara I tried regularly to loose itself from Chola domination, primarily due to the Chola influence in the Vengi kingdom. The Western Chalukyas mounted several unsuccessful attempts to engage the Chola emperors in war, and except for a brief occupation of the Vengi territories between 1118 and 1126, allied with Prince Vikramaditya VI. Cholas usually managed to dominate over the Chalukyas in the western Deccan by defeating them in war and levying tribute on them. With the occupation of Dharwar in North Central Karnataka by the Hoysalas under Vishnuvardhana, where he based himself with his son Narasimha I in charge of the Hoysala capital Dwarasamudra around 1149, and with the Kalachuris occupying the Chalukyan capital for over 35 years from around 1150–1151, the Chalukya kingdom had already started to dissolve.

The Cholas under Kulothunga Chola III collaborated to herald the dissolution of the Chalukyas by aiding the Hoysalas under Veera Ballala II, the son-in-law of the Chola monarch, and defeated the Western Chalukyas in a series of wars with Someshvara IV between 1185 and 1190. The last Chalukya king's territories did not even include the erstwhile Chalukyan capitals Badami, Manyakheta or Kalyani. That was the final dissolution of Chalukyan power though the Chalukyas existed only in name for the period 1135–1140. But the Cholas remained stable until 1215, and were then absorbed by the Pandyan empire and ceased to exist by 1279.

On the other hand, from 1150 CE to 1280 CE, the Pandya dynasty became the staunchest opponents of the Cholas and tried to win independence for their traditional territories. Thus, this period saw constant warfare between the Cholas and the Pandyas. Besides, the Cholas regularly fought with the Eastern Gangas of Kalinga. Moreover, under Chola's protection, Vengi remained largely independent. Cholas also dominated the entire eastern coast with their feudatories, the Telugu Cholas of Velanati and Nellore among others. These feudatories always aided the Cholas in their successful campaigns against the Chalukyas and levied tribute on the Kannada kingdoms. Furthermore, the Cholas fought constantly with the Sinhala kings from the Rohana kingdom of Sri Lanka, who repeatedly attempted to overthrow the Chola occupation of Rajarata and unify the island. But until the later Chola king Kulottunga I, the Cholas had firm control over the area. In one such instance, the Chola king, Rajadhiraja Chola II, was able to defeat the Sinhalese, aided by their traditional ally, a confederation of five Pandya princes, and kept the control of Rajarata under Chola rule. His successor, the last great Chola monarch Kulottunga Chola III reinforced the hold of the Chola territories by quelling further rebellions and disturbances in the Rajarata area of Sri Lanka and Madurai. He also defeated Hoysala generals who fought under Veera Ballala II at Karuvur. Furthermore, he also continued holding on to traditional territories in Tamil country, Eastern Gangavadi, Draksharama, Vengi, and Kalinga. However, after defeating Veera Ballala II, Kulottunga Chola III entered into a marital alliance with him through Ballala's marriage to a Chola princess, which improved Kulottunga Chola III's relationship with the Hoysalas. (Note: "After the second Pandya War, Kulottunga undertook a campaign to check the growth of Hoysala power in that quarter. He re-established Chola suzerainty over the Adigaimans of Tagadur, defeated a Chera ruler in battle and performed a vijayabhisheka in Karuvur (1193). His relations with the Hoysala Ballala II seems to have become friendly afterwards, for Ballala married a Chola princess".)

=== Overseas conquests ===
Map of the Chola Empire at its greatest extent under Emperor Rajendra I. c. 1030

During the reign of Rajaraja Chola I and his successors Rajendra Chola I, Virarajendra Chola and Kulothunga Chola I the Chola armies invaded Sri Lanka, the Maldives and parts of Southeast Asia like Malaysia, Indonesia and Southern Thailand of the Srivijaya Empire in the 11th century. Rajaraja Chola I launched several naval campaigns that resulted in the capture of Sri Lanka, Maldives and the Malabar Coast. In 1025, Rajendra Chola launched naval raids on the ports of Srivijaya and against the Burmese kingdom of Pegu. A Chola inscription states that he captured or plundered 14 places, which have been identified with Palembang, Tambralinga and Kedah among others. A second invasion was led by Virarajendra Chola, who conquered Kedah in Malaysia of Srivijaya in the late 11th century. Chola invasion ultimately failed to install direct administration over Srivijaya, since the invasion was short and only meant to plunder the wealth of Srivijaya. However, this invasion gravely weakened the Srivijayan hegemony and enabled the formation of regional kingdoms. Although the invasion was not followed by direct Cholan occupation and the region was unchanged geographically, there were huge consequences in trade. Tamil traders encroached on the Srivijayan realm traditionally controlled by Malay traders and the Tamil guilds' influence increased on the Malay Peninsula and the north coast of Sumatra.

=== Later Cholas (1070–1279) ===
Later Chola Kingdom under Kulothunga Chola I (1070–1120 C.E)

Marital and political alliances between the Eastern Chalukyas began during the reign of Rajaraja following his invasion of Vengi. Rajaraja Chola's daughter married Chalukya prince Vimaladitya and Rajendra Chola's daughter Ammanga Devi was married to the Eastern Chalukya prince Rajaraja Narendra. Virarajendra Chola's son, Athirajendra Chola, was assassinated in a civil disturbance in 1070, and Kulothunga Chola I, the son of Ammanga Devi and Rajaraja Narendra, ascended the Chola throne. Thus began the Later Chola dynasty.

The Later Chola dynasty was led by capable rulers such as Kulothunga Chola I, his son Vikrama Chola, other successors like Rajaraja Chola II, Rajadhiraja Chola II, and Kulothunga Chola III, who conquered Kalinga, Ilam, and Kataha. However, the rule of the later Cholas between 1218, starting with Rajaraja Chola II, to the last emperor Rajendra Chola III was not as strong as those of the emperors between 850 and 1215. Around 1118, they lost control of Vengi to the Western Chalukya and Gangavadi (southern Mysore districts) to the Hoysala Empire. However, these were only temporary setbacks, because immediately following the accession of King Vikrama Chola, the son and successor of Kulothunga Chola I, the Cholas lost no time in recovering the province of Vengi by defeating Chalukya Someshvara III and also recovering Gangavadi from the Hoysalas. The Chola empire, though not as strong as between 850 and 1150, was still largely territorially intact under Rajaraja Chola II (1146–1175) a fact attested by the construction and completion of the third grand Chola architectural marvel, the chariot-shaped Airavatesvara Temple at Dharasuram on the outskirts of modern Kumbakonam. Chola administration and territorial integrity until the rule of Kulothunga Chola III was stable and very prosperous up to 1215, but during his rule itself, the decline of the Chola power started following his defeat by Maravarman Sundara Pandiyan II in 1215–16. Subsequently, the Cholas also lost control of the island of Lanka and were driven out by the revival of Sinhala power.

In continuation of the decline, also marked by the resurgence of the Pandyan dynasty as the most powerful rulers in South India, a lack of a controlling central administration in its erstwhile Pandyan territories prompted several claimants to the Pandya throne to cause a civil war in which the Sinhalas and the Cholas were involved by proxy. Details of the Pandyan civil war and the role played by the Cholas and Sinhalas, are present in the Mahavamsa as well as the Pallavarayanpettai Inscriptions.

=== Decline ===
The setbacks suffered during the final years of Kulothunga I left a somewhat diminished empire. Kulothunga's successors Vikrama Chola (1118–1135 CE) and Kulothunga Chola II (1133–1150 CE) were capable and compassionate leaders who took care not to involve their subjects in unnecessary and unwinnable wars. Rajaraja II (1146–1173 CE), Rajadhiraja II (1166–1178 CE) and Kulothunga Chola III (1178–1218 CE) took active roles in the politics of the emerging revival of the Pandyas. Meanwhile, the Chola succession was getting murkier and murkier with disputes and intrigues during the periods of Rajadhiraja II and Kulothunga III.

The Cholas under Kulothunga Chola III collaborated to herald the dissolution of the Chalukyas by aiding Hoysalas under Veera Ballala II, the son-in-law of the Chola monarch and defeated the Western Chalukyas in a series of wars with Someshvara IV between 1185 and 1190. The last Chalukya king's territories did not even include the erstwhile Chalukyan capitals Badami, Manyakheta or Kalyani. That was the final dissolution of Chalukyan power though the Chalukyas existed only in name since 1135–1140. But the Cholas remained stable until 1215, were absorbed by the Pandyan empire and ceased to exist by 1279.

His successor, the last great Chola monarch Kulottunga Chola III reinforced the hold of the Chola territories by quelling further rebellions and disturbances in the Rajarata area of Sri Lanka and Madurai. He also defeated Hoysala generals who fought under Veera Ballala II at Karuvur. Eastern Gangavadi, Draksharama, Vengi, and Kalinga. However, after defeating Veera Ballala II, Kulottunga Chola III entered into a marital alliance with him through Ballala's marriage to a Chola princess, which improved the Kulottunga Chola III's relationship with Hoysalas.

== Administration and society ==
=== Chola territory ===
Main polities in continental Asia c. 1100

According to Tamil tradition, the Chola country comprised the region that includes the modern-day Tiruchirapalli District, Tiruvarur District, Nagapattinam District, Ariyalur District, Perambalur district, Pudukkottai district, Thanjavur District in Tamil Nadu and Karaikal District. The river Kaveri and its tributaries dominate this landscape of generally flat country that gradually slopes towards the sea, unbroken by major hills or valleys. The river, which is also known as the Ponni (Golden) river, had a special place in the culture of Cholas. The annual floods in the Kaveri marked an occasion for celebration, known as Adiperukku, in which the whole nation took part.

Kaveripoompattinam on the coast near the Kaveri delta was a major port town. Ptolemy knew of this, which he called Khaberis, and the other port town of Nagappattinam as the most important centres of Cholas. These two towns became hubs of trade and commerce and attracted many religious faiths, including Buddhism. (Note: The Buddhist work Milinda Panha dated to the early Christian era, mentions Kolapttna among the best-known seaports on the Chola coast.) Roman ships found their way into these ports. Roman coins dating from the early centuries of the common era have been found near the Kaveri delta.

The other major towns were Thanjavur, Uraiyur and Kudanthai, now known as Kumbakonam. After Rajendra Chola moved his capital to Gangaikonda Cholapuram, Thanjavur lost its importance.

== Cultural contributions ==
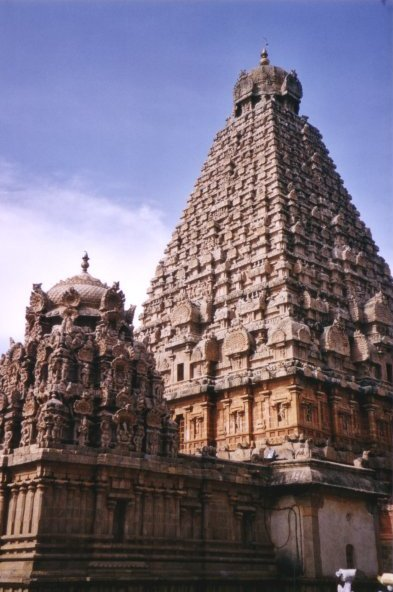
Detail of the main vimanam (tower) of the Thanjavur Temple.

Under the Cholas, the Tamil country reached new heights of excellence in art, religion, music and literature. In all of these spheres, the Chola period marked the culmination of movements that had begun at an earlier age under the Pallavas. Monumental architecture in the form of majestic temples and sculpture in stone and bronze reached a finesse never before achieved in India.

The Chola conquest of Kadaram (Kedah) and Srivijaya, and their continued commercial contacts with the Chinese Empire, enabled them to influence the local cultures. Examples of the Hindu cultural influence found today throughout Southeast Asia owe much to the legacy of the Cholas. For example, the great temple complex at Prambanan in Indonesia exhibits several similarities with South Indian architecture.

According to the Malay chronicle Sejarah Melayu, the rulers of the Malacca sultanate claimed to be descendants of the kings of the Chola empire. Chola rule is remembered in Malaysia today as many princes there have names ending with Cholan or Chulan, one such being Raja Chulan, the Raja of Perak.

=== Literature ===
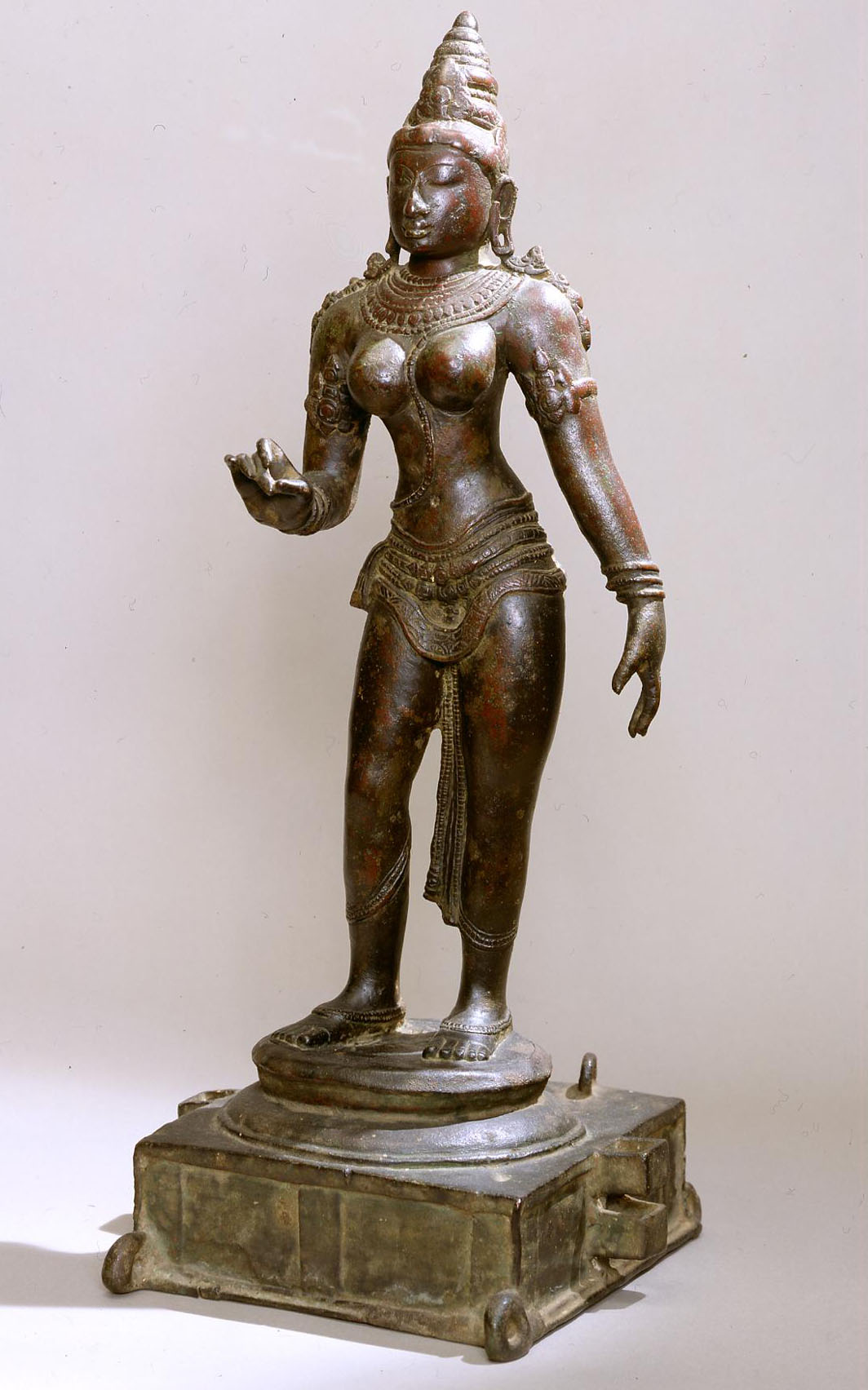
Chola bronze from the Ulster Museum

The Imperial Chola era was the golden age of Tamil culture, marked by the importance of literature. Chola records cite many works, including the Rajarajesvara Natakam, Viranukkaviyam and Kannivana Puranam.

The revival of Hinduism from its nadir during the Kalabhras spurred the construction of numerous temples and these in turn generated Shaiva and Vaishnava devotional literature. Jain and Buddhist authors flourished as well, although in fewer numbers than in previous centuries. Jivaka-chintamani by Tirutakkatevar and Sulamani by Tolamoli are among notable works by non-Hindu authors. The grammarian Buddhamitra wrote a text on Tamil grammar called Virasoliyam. Commentaries were written on the great text Tolkāppiyam which deals with grammar but which also mentions ethics of warfare. Periapuranam was another remarkable literary piece of this period. This work is in a sense a national epic of the Tamil people because it treats the lives of the saints who lived in all parts of Tamil Nadu and belonged to all classes of society, men and women, high and low, educated and uneducated.

Kamban flourished during the reign of Kulothunga III. Jayamkondar's Kalingattuparani, draws a clear boundary between history and fictitious conventions. The Tamil poet Ottakuttan was a contemporary of Kulothunga I and served at the courts of three of Kulothunga's successors.

Nannul is a Chola era work on Tamil grammar. It discusses all five branches of grammar and, according to Berthold Spuler, is still relevant today and is one of the most distinguished normative grammars of literary Tamil.

The Telugu Choda period was in particular significant for the development of Telugu literature under the patronage of the rulers. It was the age in which the great Telugu poets Tikkana, Ketana, Marana and Somana enriched the literature with their contributions. Tikkana Somayaji wrote Nirvachanottara Ramayanamu and Andhra Mahabharatamu. Abhinava Dandi Ketana wrote Dasakumaracharitramu, Vijnaneswaramu and Andhra Bhashabhushanamu. Marana wrote Markandeya Purana in Telugu. Somana wrote Basava Purana. Tikkana is one of the kavitrayam who translated Mahabharata into Telugu language.

Of the devotional literature, the arrangement of the Shaivite canon into eleven books was the work of Nambi Andar Nambi, who lived close to the end of the 10th century. However, relatively few Vaishnavite works were composed during the Later Chola period, possibly because of the rulers' apparent animosity towards them.

=== Religion ===
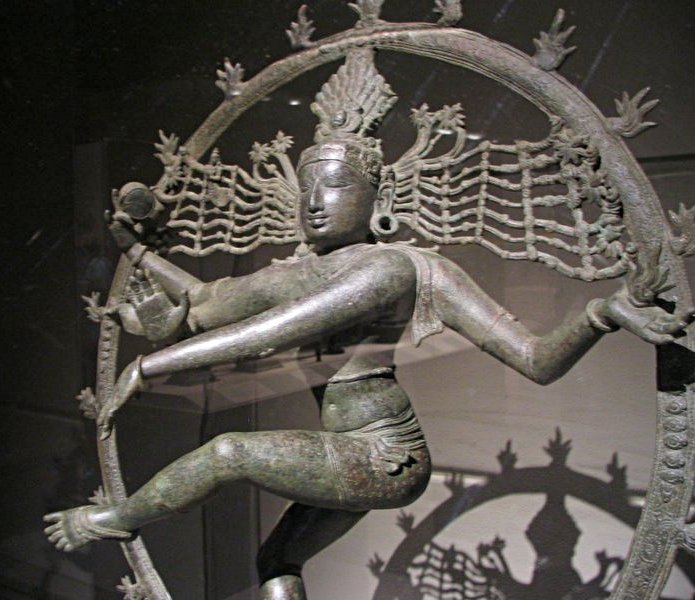
Bronze Chola Statue of Nataraja at the Metropolitan Museum of Art, New York City

In general, Cholas were followers of Hinduism. They were not swayed by the rise of Buddhism and Jainism as were the kings of the Pallava and Pandya dynasties. Kocengannan, an Early Chola, was celebrated in both Sangam literature and in the Shaivite canon as a Hindu saint.

Among the Tamil film and entertainment industry, there is a rising trend of terming the Cholas as non-Hindus. Noted Tamil film director, producer and screenwriter Vetrimaaran asserted at a function in 2022 that the Cholas were not Hindus. At the same event, another leading Tamil actor, film director, film producer, screenwriter, choreographer, playback singer, lyricist, television presenter, social activist and politician Kamal Haasan, while supporting Vetrimaaran asserted Hindu religion did not exist during the Chola period.

== In popular culture ==
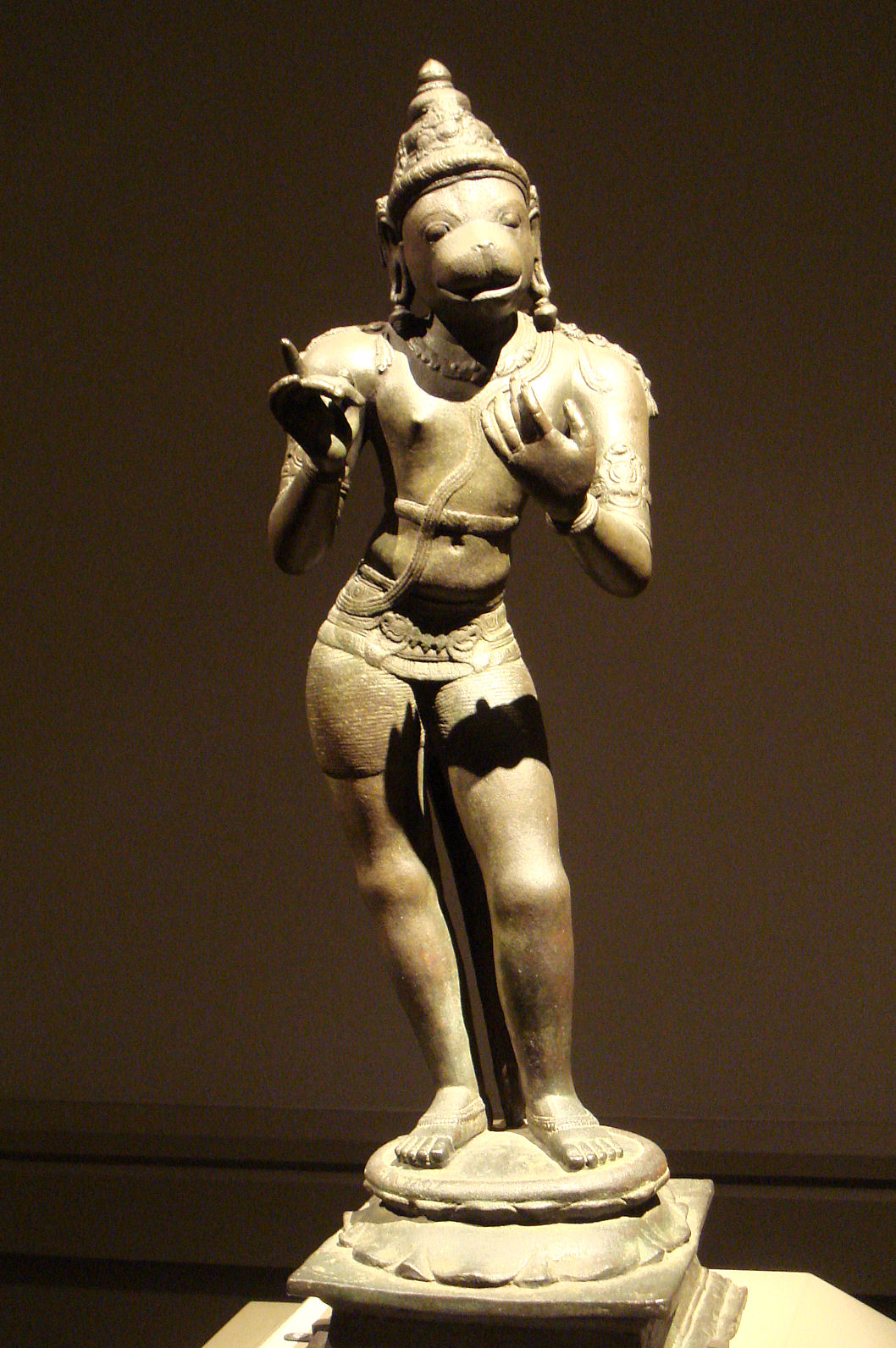
Standing Hanuman, Chola Dynasty, 11th century.

The Chola dynasty has inspired many Tamil authors. The most important work of this genre is the popular Ponniyin Selvan (The son of Ponni), a historical novel in Tamil written by Kalki Krishnamurthy. Written in five volumes, this narrates the story of Rajaraja Chola, dealing with the events leading up to the ascension of Uttama Chola to the Chola throne. Kalki had used the confusion in the succession to the Chola throne after the demise of Parantaka Chola II. The book was serialised in the Tamil periodical Kalki during the mid-1950s. The serialisation lasted for nearly five years and every week its publication was awaited with great interest.

Kalki's earlier historical romance, Parthiban Kanavu, deals with the fortunes of the imaginary Chola prince Vikraman, who was supposed to have lived as a feudatory of the Pallava king Narasimhavarman I during the 7th century. The period of the story lies within the interregnum during which the Cholas were in decline before Vijayalaya Chola revived their fortunes. Parthiban Kanavu was also serialised in the Kalki weekly during the early 1950s.

Sandilyan, another popular Tamil novelist, wrote Kadal Pura in the 1960s. It was serialised in the Tamil weekly Kumudam. Kadal Pura is set during the period when Kulothunga Chola I was in exile from the Vengi kingdom after he was denied the throne. It speculates the whereabouts of Kulothunga during this period. Sandilyan's earlier work, Yavana Rani, written in the early 1960s, is based on the life of Karikala Chola. More recently, Balakumaran wrote the novel Udaiyar, which is based on the circumstances surrounding Rajaraja Chola's construction of the Brihadisvara Temple in Thanjavur.

There were stage productions based on the life of Rajaraja Chola during the 1950s and in 1973 Sivaji Ganesan acted in a screen adaptation of a play titled Rajaraja Cholan. The Cholas are featured in the History of the World board game, produced by Avalon Hill.

The Cholas were the subject of the 2010 Tamil-language film Aayirathil Oruvan, the 2022 film Ponniyin Selvan: I and the 2023 film Ponniyin Selvan: II. The 2022 and 2023 movies were based on the novel of the same name.

== See also ==
- Chola Empire
- Telugu Cholas of Andhra
- Chodagangas of Kalinga
- Nidugal Cholas of Karnataka
- History of Tamil Nadu
- Karungalakudi
- List of Tamil monarchs
- Tamil inscriptions in Malaysia
- Mutharaiyar dynasty

Timeline and cultural period	Indus plain (Punjab-Sapta Sindhu-Gujarat)	Gangetic Plain			Central India	Southern India
Timeline and cultural period	Indus plain (Punjab-Sapta Sindhu-Gujarat)	Upper Gangetic Plain (Ganga-Yamuna doab)	Middle Gangetic Plain	Lower Gangetic Plain	Central India	Southern India
IRON AGE
Culture	Late Vedic Period	Late Vedic Period; Painted Grey Ware culture	Late Vedic Period; Northern Black Polished Ware		Pre-history	
6th century BCE	Gandhara	Kuru-Panchala	Magadha		Adivasi (tribes)	Assaka
Culture	Persian-Greek influences	"Second Urbanisation"; Rise of Shramana movements Jainism - Buddhism - Ājīvika - Yoga			Pre-history	
5th century BCE	(Persian conquests)		Shaishunaga dynasty		Adivasi (tribes)	Assaka
4th century BCE	(Greek conquests)	Nanda empire				
HISTORICAL AGE
Culture	Spread of Buddhism				Pre-history	
3rd century BCE	Maurya Empire					Satavahana dynasty Sangam period (300 BCE – 200 CE); Early Cholas; Early Pandyan kingdom Cheras
Culture	Preclassical Hinduism (Note: Michaels (2004) p.39) - "Hindu Synthesis" (Note: Hiltebeitel (2002)) (ca. 200 BCE - 300 CE) (Note: Michaels (2004) p.39) (Note: Hiltebeitel (2002)); Epics - Puranas - Ramayana - Mahabharata - Bhagavad Gita - Brahma Sutras - Smarta Tradition; Mahayana Buddhism					
2nd century BCE	Indo-Greek Kingdom		Shunga Empire; Maha-Meghavahana Dynasty			Satavahana dynasty Sangam period (300 BCE – 200 CE); Early Cholas; Early Pandyan kingdom Cheras
1st century BCE	Indo-Greek Kingdom		Shunga Empire; Maha-Meghavahana Dynasty			Satavahana dynasty Sangam period (300 BCE – 200 CE); Early Cholas; Early Pandyan kingdom Cheras
1st century CE	Indo-Scythians; Indo-Parthians		Kuninda Kingdom			Satavahana dynasty Sangam period (300 BCE – 200 CE); Early Cholas; Early Pandyan kingdom Cheras
2nd century	Kushan Empire					Satavahana dynasty Sangam period (300 BCE – 200 CE); Early Cholas; Early Pandyan kingdom Cheras
3rd century	Kushano-Sasanian Kingdom; Western Satraps	Kushan Empire		Kamarupa kingdom	Adivasi (tribes)	Satavahana dynasty Sangam period (300 BCE – 200 CE); Early Cholas; Early Pandyan kingdom Cheras
Culture	"Golden Age of Hinduism"(ca. CE 320-650) (Note: Michaels (2004) p.40); Puranas - Kural; Co-existence of Hinduism and Buddhism					
4th century	Kidarites	Gupta Empire; Varman dynasty				Andhra Ikshvakus; Kalabhra dynasty Kadamba Dynasty; Western Ganga Dynasty
5th century	Hephthalite Empire	Alchon Huns				Vishnukundina; Kalabhra dynasty
6th century	Nezak Huns; Kabul Shahi; Maitraka				Adivasi (tribes)	Vishnukundina; Badami Chalukyas; Kalabhra dynasty
Culture	Late-Classical Hinduism (ca. CE 650-1100) (Note: Michaels (2004) p.41); Advaita Vedanta - Tantra; Decline of Buddhism in India					
7th century	Indo-Sassanids		Vakataka dynasty Empire of Harsha	Mlechchha dynasty	Adivasi (tribes)	Badami Chalukyas; Eastern Chalukyas; Pandyan kingdom (revival); Pallava
7th century	Karkota dynasty				Adivasi (tribes)	
8th century	Kabul Shahi	Pala Empire			Adivasi (tribes)	Eastern Chalukyas; Pandyan kingdom Kalachuri
9th century	Gurjara-Pratihara				Adivasi (tribes)	Rashtrakuta Empire; Eastern Chalukyas; Pandyan kingdom Medieval Cholas; Chera Perumals of Makkotai
10th century	Ghaznavids			Pala dynasty Kamboja-Pala dynasty	Adivasi (tribes)	Kalyani Chalukyas; Eastern Chalukyas; Medieval Cholas; Chera Perumals of Makkotai; Rashtrakuta
References and sources for table References Sources: Flood, Gavin D. (1996), An Introduction to Hinduism, Cambridge University Press; Hiltebeitel, Alf (2002), Hinduism. In: Joseph Kitagawa, "The Religious Traditions of Asia: Religion, History, and Culture", Routledge; Michaels, Axel (2004), Hinduism. Past and present, Princeton, New Jersey: Princeton University Press
