= Virarajendra =

Chola emperor from 1063 to 1070

Virarajendra Chola
- Rajakesarivarman, Karikala Chola, Vira Chola, Maharajadhiraja, Pandya Kulantaka, Konerinmaikondan, Srimedinivallabha, Ahavamalla Kula Kaalan, Sakalabhuvanasraya
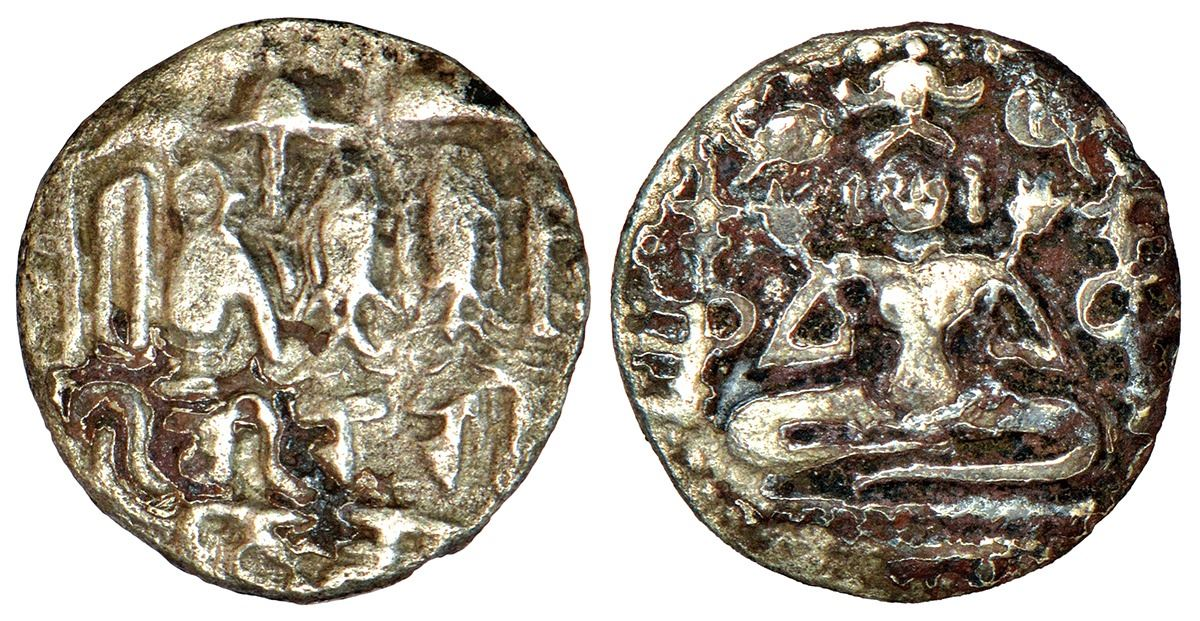
- Gold Kahavanu of Virarajendra; 11th century

Chola Emperor
- Reign: 1063–1070
- Predecessor: Rajendra II
- Successor: Athirajendra

King of Kadaram
- Reign: 1067–1070
- Predecessor: position established
- Successor: Athirajendra
- Born: 1002; Thanjavur, Chola Empire (modern day Thanjavur, Tamil Nadu, India)
- Died: 1070 (aged 68); Gangaikonda Cholapuram, Chola Empire (modern day Jayankondam, Tamil Nadu, India)
- Empress: Arulmolinangai
- Issue: Athirajendra; Gangai kondan Rajasundari
- Dynasty: Chola
- Father: Rajendra I
- Mother: Mukkokilan Adigal
- Religion: Hinduism

Virarajendra Chola (1002 – 1070) was a Chola emperor. A son of Rajendra I, he spent a majority of his life as a subordinate to two of his elder brothers, Rajadhiraja I and Rajendra II. During his early reign, he founded a school to study the Vedas, Sastras and grammar, with a hostel for students. He also founded a hospital named Virasolan. The famous Tamil Buddhist grammatical work, Virasoliyam, was written by Buddhamitra during his reign.

Virarajendra’s reign occurred in a period when the Chola Empire was trying to both expand its boundaries and preserve its existing territories, but was hindered by the death of Virarajendra’s eldest brother and king, Rajadhiraja I, and the short rule of Virarajendra's elder brother, Rajendra II.

In total, the three brothers ruled for 16–20 years altogether, succeeding one another. The traditional enemies and subordinates of the Cholas: the Singhalas (Ceylon), the Pandyas, and the Chera Perumals, took advantage of the instability by attempting to break free or wage war against the Chola. Virarajendra was described as a capable and brave ruler, who was kind and protective of his subjects, reimposed authority on Chola dominions, and was ruthless to the Chalukyas and the Pandyas. His own rule lasted for less than 10 years, and is depicted by various inscriptions in Karur. He succeeded not only in preserving Chola territories, but also in making overseas conquests in far-off lands such as Indonesia, Malaysia, Sri Lanka, and Nicobar.

== Early life ==
Virarajendra was posted as the Chola viceroy of Sri Lanka by his elder brother, Rajadhiraja Chola during the early part of the latter's reign. Subsequently, during the reign of his other elder brother Rajendra Chola II, he served as the Lord of Uraiyur.

== Military conflicts ==
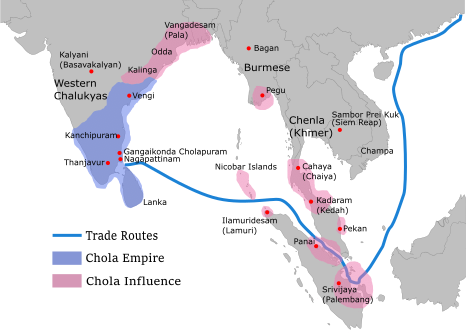
Chola Territories c. 1065 C.E.

Virarajendra fought many battles against the Western Chalukya Empire, the main catalyst for these conflicts being the Chola interest in the Vengi Chalukyas. He fought the Western Chalukyas near Visaiyavadai (modern Vijayawada) and routed the Western Chalukyas on the banks of the river Krishna and re-asserted Chola authority over the domains of the Eastern Chalukyas. He also invaded Singhala Nadu (Ceylon) and ruthlessly crushed attempts by the Singhala kings to free their kingdom from Chola control.

=== Early battles ===
During the early period of his reign, Virarajendra fought and killed the king of Pottapi, and king of the Kerala (Chera Perumal) country. He also had to suppress a rebellion in the Pandya territories by the Pandya princes. While these battles were progressing, the Western Chalukya Someshvara I invaded Chola territory, seeking revenge for his earlier humiliation at the hands of Virarajendra's predecessor, Rajendra II. First, Someshvara I sent his son Vikkalan (Vikramaditya VI) to attack Gangaikonda Cholapuram, the capital of Chola. In 1066, during the reign of the Western Chalukya king Someshvara I, Vikramaditya VI had invaded the Chola Empire penetrating as far as the capital Gangaikonda Cholapuram and threatening the city before being repulsed. Virarajendra was returning after subduing the Pandyas, the Sinhalas and the Chera Perumal kings and making them vassal states. He immediately undertook the task of safeguarding the Chola capital, defeating Vikramaditya VI. Virarajendra then pursued the Chalukya princes Vikramaditya (Vikkalan) and Singhanan, defeating them at Gangapadi. After subsequently defeating another Chalukya army led by both princes and sons of Someshvara I, he proceeded to the Chalukyan capital, defeating Someshvara I who fled the battlefield.

Hail ! Prosperity ! While courage was (his) only help and liberality (his) only ornament, (the king) wielded the sceptre and dispelled the dark Kali (age). (He) terrified Ahavamalla at Kudalsangama saw the retreating back of Vikkalan (i.e.,Vikramaditya VI) and Singanan (ie., Jayasimha), and seized riches and vehicles along with his (viz., Ahavamalla's) great queens.

— (Line 1.) No. 82.- Inscription at Kilur

(He) terrified Ahavamalla yet a second time on the appointed battle-field, fulfilled the vow of the elder brother who was born with him, seized Vengai-nadu, and performed the anontment of victors.

— ( Line 3.) No. 82.- Inscription at Kilur

The third war fought by Virarajendra against the Chalukyas occurred when Someshvara I sent his son Vikramaditya VI to occupy Vengi on the presumption that due to the death of his old nemesis Rajendra II, Vengi became subordinate to Western Chalukya rule. Virarajendra's armies routed the Western Chalukyas at Vengi, after which they surrounded Kalyanpura, the Chalukyan capital. They sacked the fortress at Kampili taking treasure and the queen of Someshvara I, well as eliminating his generals and trusted feudatories. They also captured Someshvara I's horses and prized elephants.

Virarajendra successfully quelled the rebellions at Ceylon, Madurai and the Chera Perumal Kingdom, Potappi and converted the Western Chalukyas (at the seven and a half lakshas of Rattapadi) into vassals.

=== Continuing Chalukya battles ===
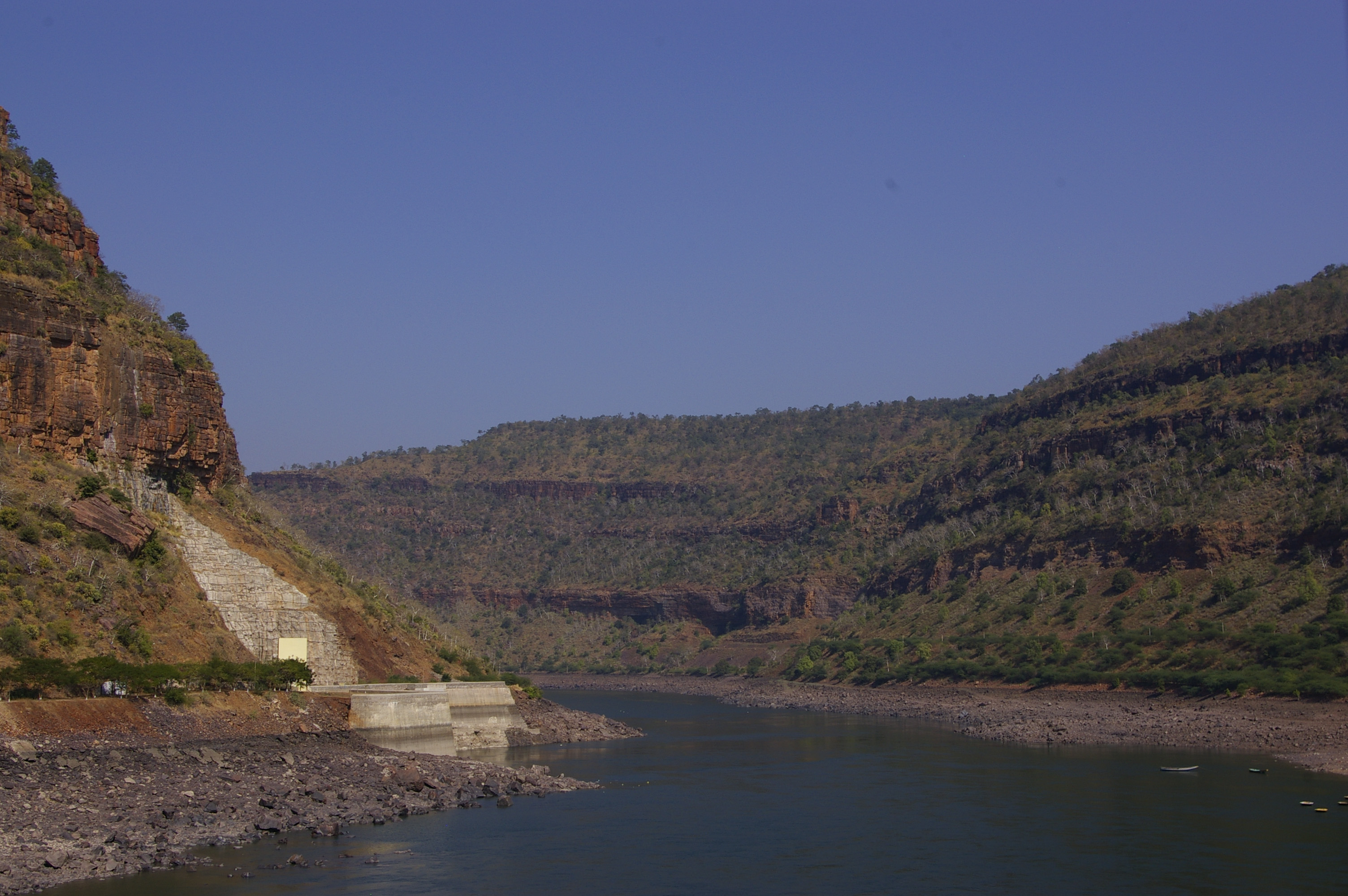
The Krishna River. the site of several Battles during the Chola-Chalukya Wars.

Virarajendra’s reign is marked by the numerous inscriptions detailing his various victories against the Western Chalukyas. Virarajendra was involved in the battles against the Western Chalukyas even before he became king. Under the command of the then heir to the throne Rajamahendra, Virarajendra fought the Chalukya forces in the Battle of Mudakkaru and defeated the Chalukya forces led by Dandanayaka Valadeva and other chieftains of the army in this battle in which the Dandanayaka and his other chieftains fell; Irugaiyan and others were forced to retreat together with their king, Someshwara, and the proud Vikramaditya VI, unable to resist the vigorous attack of the Chola army. The inscription of Rajamahendra mentioned, likewise, that by a war elephant, he caused Ahavamalla to turn his back on the Mudakkaru. During Virarajendra’s reign, Someshvara, the loser of this battle, sought to take revenge and called for battle with the Cholas. In his inscriptions at Karur and Tindivanam, Virarajendra claims proudly that Someshvara-I's sons Vikramaditya VI (called Vikkalan) and Jayasimha (called Singhanan) fled the battlefield with dishevelled hair. Virarajendra further claimed that he defeated Someshvara I's armies no less than five times. These battles took place at Kudalasangamam, Gangaikondacholapuram, Karur, Kampili and Vengi. On each occasion, the generals of Someshvara I (such as Chamundaraja) were beheaded. Maduvana and Vikramaditya VI fled the battlefield with Jayasimha and Annala, and finally Ahavamalla Someshvara I too fled the battle. In another war, Someshvara I's second son, Someshvara II, was expelled from Kannada country. Someshvara I then decided to challenge Virarajendra to battle.

Someshvara I wrote to Virarajendra assigning a site in a place called Kudal Sangamam for the battle, near the site of the previous battle in which the Chalukya forces were previously defeated. Receiving this message, Virarajendra immediately set out for the battle and camped near Kandai for the Chalukyan army to arrive. The exact date set for the battle, according to Virarajendra’s inscription found at Manimangalam, was Monday, 10 September 1067 C.E.

The Chola army awaited the expected battle for more than a month, but Someshvara I's army did not arrive. The Chola army then devastated the surrounding countryside and erected a pillar of victory on the banks of the Tungabhadra River.

There is no verifiable and known reason for Someshvara’s decision not to face the Cholas at Kudala Sangama. There was a running succession feud between his first son and chosen heir, Someshvara II and Vikramaditya VI, and Vikramaditya VI did not want to fight for his father. The inscription of Virarajendra at Perumber, after the expulsion of Someshvara II from Kannada country, describes that Vikramaditya VI allied with Virarajendra. Virarajendra immediately nominated Vikramaditya VI as the heir to the Chalukya throne and also gave his daughter in marriage to him after extracting a promise that his daughter's son will succeed Vikramaditya VI as the next Chalukya King.

Someshvara I committed suicide by drowning himself in March 1068 C.E. Virarajendra's records say that Someshvara I attempted to hide himself in the western sea, which indicates the probability of Someshvara I having been drowned in the Arabian sea while running away from the Chola army.

From Kudal Sangamam, the Chola army proceeded to Vengi to re-establish their control on the Eastern Chalukyan Kingdom. Prior to his death, Someshvara I had sent his son Vikramaditya VI (Vikkalan) and a senior trusted General to capture Vengi and install a puppet ruler subordinate to Someshvara I. In a battle on the banks of the Krishna River, near Visaiyavadai or modern Vijayawada, Virarajendra defeated the Western Chalukya army led by Jananatha. Virarajendra then proceeded to conquer the entire Eastern Chalukya kingdom, defeated and re-captured Kalinga whose king had been in alliance with the Western Chalukyas. Virarajendra installed Vijayaditya VI, the Eastern Chalukya prince, on the Vengi throne. Virarajendra Chola defeated Ahavamalla Someshwara I on not less than five occasions. Virarajendra Chola also put to flight the latter's two sons, Vikkalan (Vikramaditya VI) and Singanan (Jayasimha III), multiple times in the battles of Kudala sangama. Virarajendra Chola also defeated the eldest son of Someshwara I, and crown-prince Someshwara II in the Battle of Kampili and spoiled his coronation ceremony in 1068 C.E.

=== War in Sri Lanka ===
Vijayabahu, the Sinhalese king, who had been ruling a small southern portion of the island around the Rohana district, sought to extend his power and expel the Chola occupiers. Mahavamsa records that Virarajendra sent the Chola army stationed in the island to attack the Rohana district. Vijayabahu then sent for help from the king of Burma who sent ships and soldiers to assist Vijayabahu. With this help, Vijayabahu succeeded in creating a revolt in the northern provinces of Lanka. Although the Chola forces in the island and reinforcements sent from the mainland could control these revolts, Vijayabahu continued to create revolts and disturbances within the Chola occupied areas of the island for the next few years.

=== Kadaram Campaign ===
Virarajendra's records from his seventh year mention that he conquered Kadaram on behalf of a king who had come to ask for help and protection and handed it over to him. The possible date for this occurrence is 1068 C.E. The Cholas continued a series of raids and conquests throughout what is now Indonesia and Malaysia for the next 20 years. This first re-affirmed the hold of the Chola kingdom on the far east, it also enabled freeing of any barriers put by some kingdoms in the Java-Malaya peninsula on traders from Chola territories including from their subordinate divisions in Sri Lanka. While Srivijaya, Kediri, Champa etc. became independent later on, both during the time of Virarajendra till almost the last days of the Chola kingdom, at least till 1215 CE, trade relations between Tamilakam and the Far East continued unhindered.

== Inscriptions and literature ==
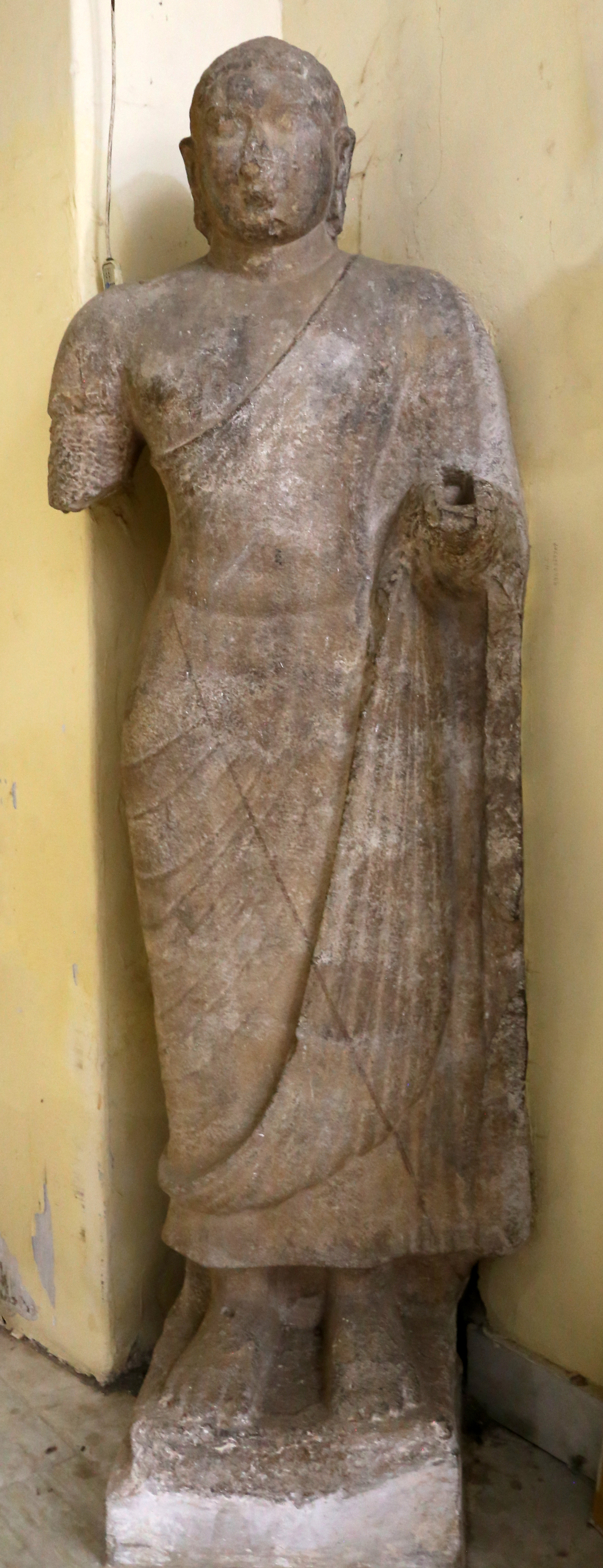
Chola-era Buddha Sculpture found in Kanchipuram. currently held in Government Museum, Chennai.

The inscriptions of Virarajendra begin with the introduction, Viramey-tunaiyagavum and he bore the title Rajakesari. An inscription of the king from a temple in Chingleput district gives his natal star as Aslesha. Another inscription from the Tiruttaleesvara temple in Tirupattur, Ramnad district, mentions the king's father as the conqueror of Purvadesam, Ganges and Kadaram(i.e.,Kedah)

The Kanyakumari inscription describe, Virarajendradeva alias Vira-Chola;

(slew at Kudalsangama the kings of the Mannata family; conquered the Vengi and the Kalinga countries; established brahmadeyas in the Chola, Tundira, Pandya, Gangavadi and Kuluta countries; and saw the back of Ahavamalla three times).

Ottakoothar's Vikrama Cholan Ula mentions Virarajendra:

The king Virarajendra Chola, killed countless shining, rutting elephants

in the city of Kudala Sangamam, and he was praised by poets in a great Parani poem.

He belongs to the lineage of Vikrama Chola

— Ottakoothar, Vikrama Cholan Ula, verse 22

== Alliance ==
At the death of Someshvara I, his son Someshvara II came to the Chalukyan throne in April 1068 CE. Soon after, a dispute broke out between him and his younger brother Vikramaditya and a civil war ensued in the Western Chalukya country. Vikramaditya VI fled to the Chola court of Virarajendra, where he was well received by the king. Virarajendra himself records that he recognised Vikramaditya VI as the king of Western Chalukya. Virarajendra married his daughter to Vikramaditya VI and forged an alliance with him, halting the long feud between the two empires.

== Personal life ==
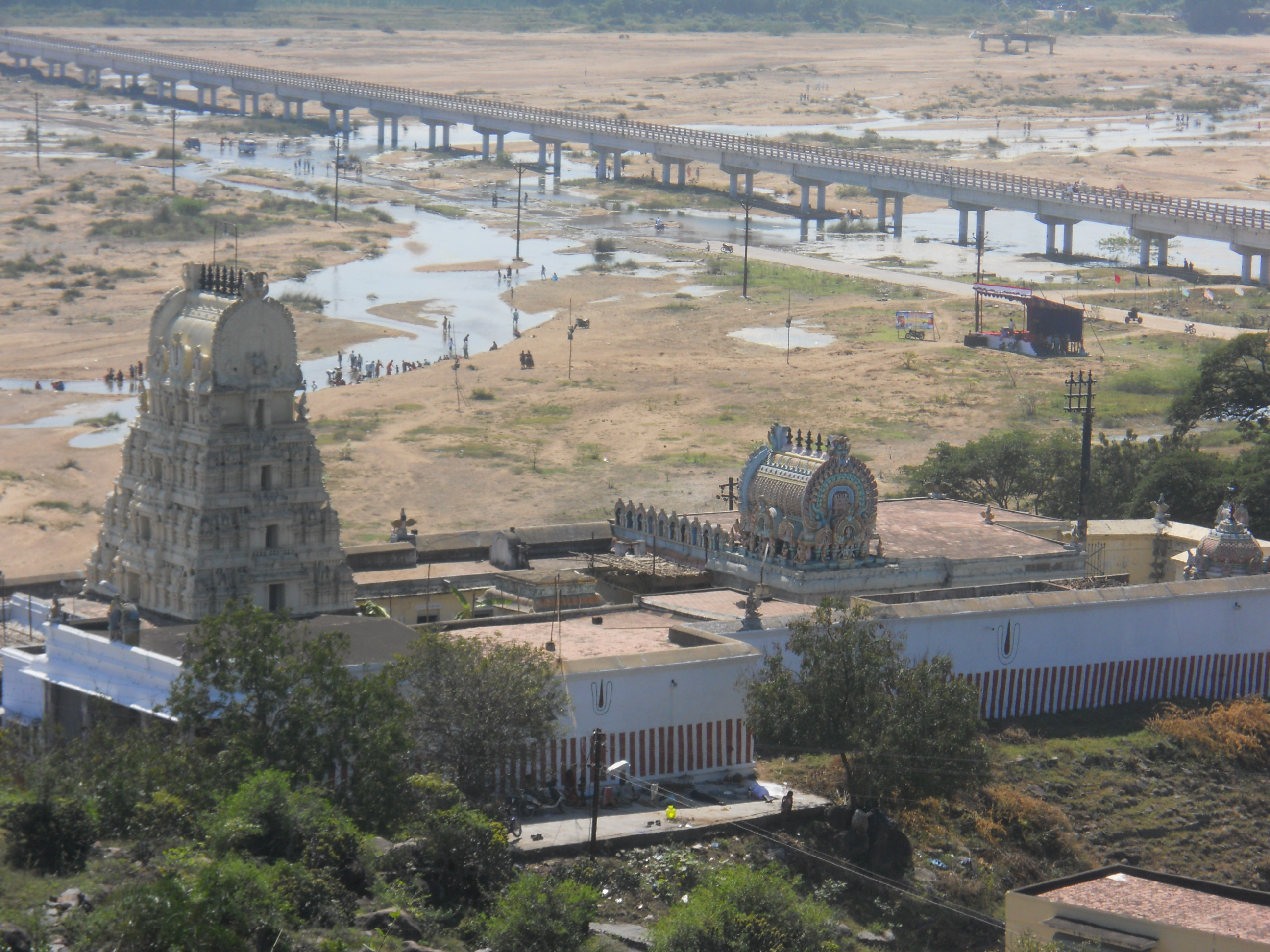
Aerial view of the Venkatesa Perumal Temple in Thirumukkudal (near Kanchipuram), a temple built by Veerendra in 1069 C.E. The temple also Included a Hospital and Vedic schools.

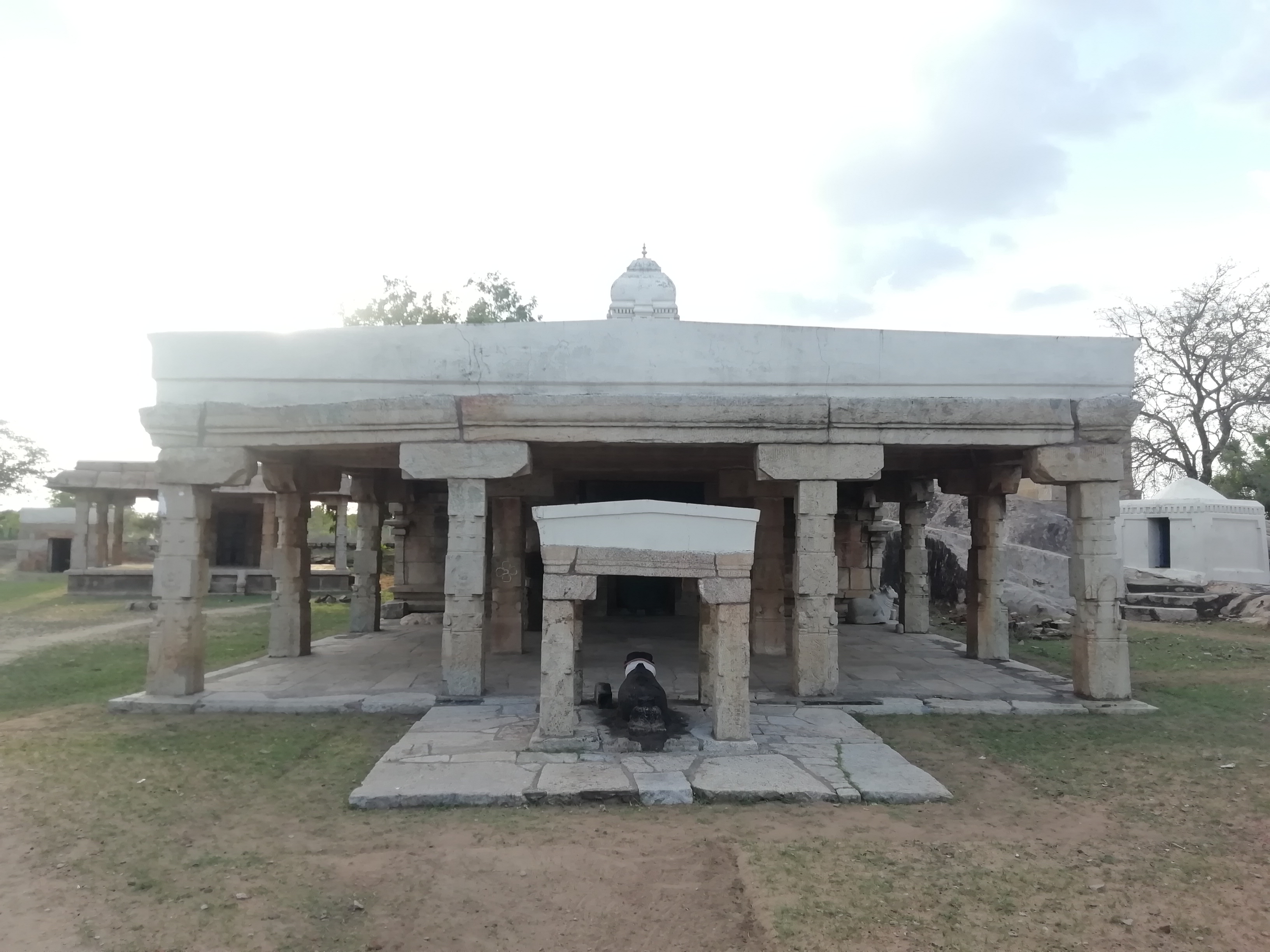
Shine of the Venkatesa Perumal Temple at Tirumukkoodal

Virarajendra was a younger brother of Rajadhiraja Chola and Rajendra Chola II and regularly figures in many of their inscriptions. From the inscription of one of his successors viz., Kulothunga Chola I, in the Brihadeeswarar temple in Thanjavur dated in the 15th year of his reign, it is known that the name of Virarajendra's queen was Arumolinangai. Virarajendra Chola's daughter Rajasundari married an Eastern Ganga Dynasty prince, and her son Anantavarman Chodaganga Deva became the progenitor of the Eastern Ganga dynasty.

== Death and succession ==
From an inscription of his from Tirunamanallur dated in the fourth year of his reign, it is known that Virarajendra held the titles Sakalabhuvanasraya, Srimedinivallabha, Maharajadhiraja Cholakula-Sundara, Pandyakulantaka, Ahavamallakula-Kala, Ahavamallanai-mummadi-ven-kanda Rajasraya, Vira-Chola, Karikala Chola, The Glory of the Solar race, Sri-Virarajendradeva, Rajakesarivarma Perumanadigal (similar to the Nolamba Pallava titles of Permanadi from Kannada country) and Konerinmaikondan. Tirunamanallur was also called as Tirunavlur or Rajadittapuram, named after his great predecessor Rajaditya Chola.

Virarajendra Chola died in early 1070 CE. He probably was not much younger than his elder brother Rajendra II or Rajadhiraja Chola and was probably into his middle years when he ascended the throne. Virarajendra was succeeded by his son and heir apparent Athirajendra Chola.

The Thanjavur inscription of his successor Kulottunga I gives the name of Virarajendra's queen as Arumoli Nangai. He also had an elder brother called Alavandan on whom he conferred the title 'Rajaraja' or Rajadhiraja. Early in his reign Virarajendra appointed his son Madurantaka as viceroy of Tondaimandalam with the title of Cholendra. According to historian Sethuraman, this Madurantakan was the son of Rajadhiraja Chola I Another son Gangaikondachola was made viceroy of the Pandya territories. It is not known which of these two sons was Athirajendra. Like his elder brother Rajadhiraja, Virarajendra also referred to his father as the one who took Purvadesam, Gangai and Kadaram. The most stand out aspect of his rule is the fact that he is known to be the one who issued an excessively large number of grants and edicts . The king was a devotee at the feet of lord at Thillai (Sivan) at Chidambaram, to whom he presented a necklace consisting of rubies of high quality. However, like all his predecessors, he also patronized and cared for temples of all faiths including those of Lord Vishnu.

== Notes ==
Preceded by Rajendra Chola II	Chola; 1063–1070 CE	Succeeded by Athirajendra Chola
