= Someshvara II =

Western Chalukya Emperor from 1068 to 1076

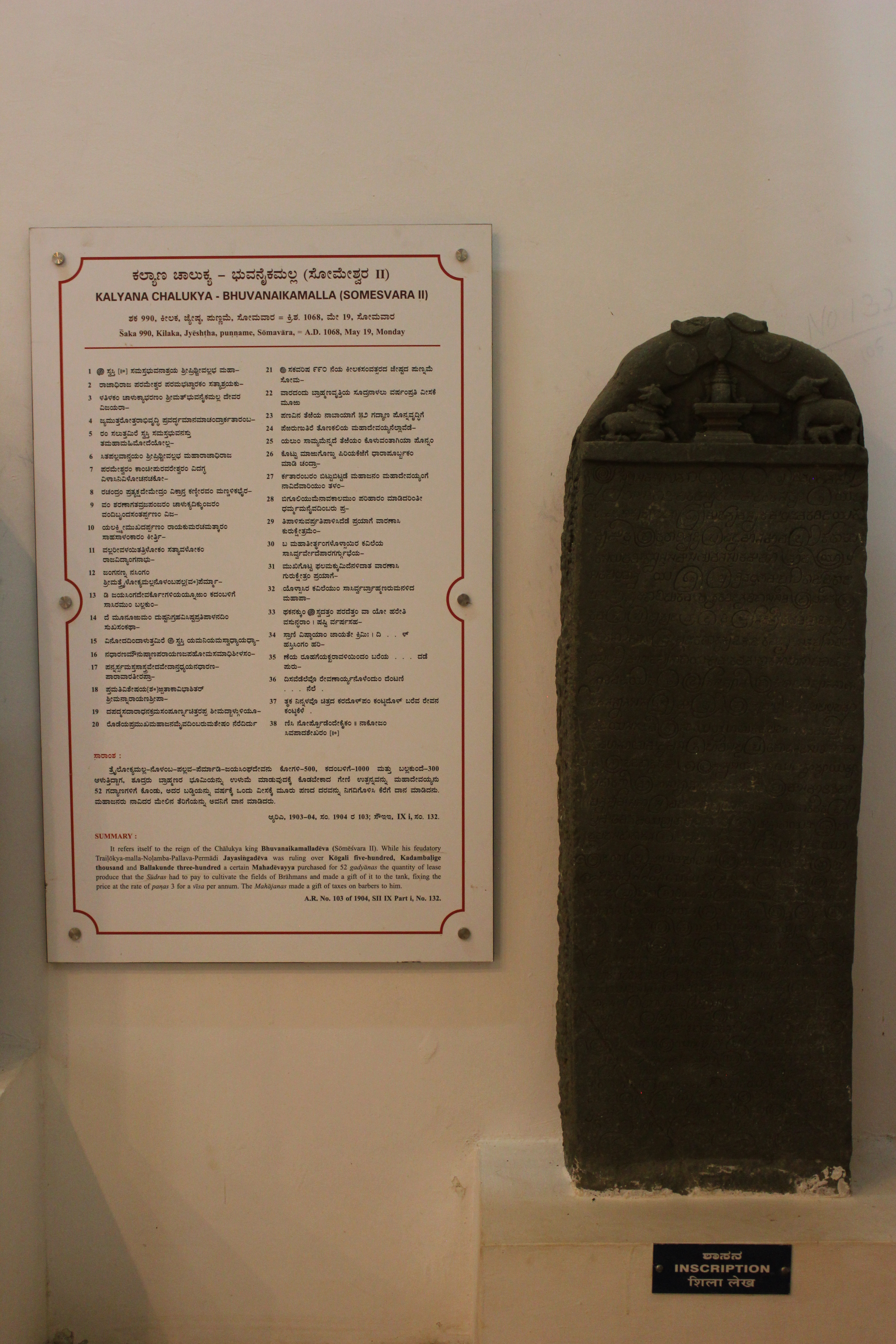
- Old Kannada inscription dated c.1068 AD of Western Chalukya King Bhuvanaikamalla Someshvara II

Western Chalukya King
- Reign: 11 April 1068 – 1076
- Predecessor: Someshvara I
- Successor: Vikramaditya VI
- House: Chalukya dynasty
- Father: Someshvara I

Someshvara II (IAST: Someśvara; r. 1068–1076) was the Western Chalukya king from 1068 to 1076. He was the eldest son of Someshvara I and succeeded him in April 1068. During his reign Someshvara II was constantly under threat from his more ambitious younger brother Vikramaditya VI. Eventually Someshvara was deposed by Vikramaditya VI.

Around 1070 Someshvara II expanded his empire and brought Malwa under his control.

== Chola invasion ==
Almost immediately after coming to power, Someshvara II had to face an invasion by the Chola forces led by Virarajendra Chola. The Chola army invaded the Chalukya country and laid a siege to the town of Gutti in Kurnool district and attacked Kampili. Instead of assisting his brother in order to save the Chalukya kingdom, Vikramaditya turned the troubles of his brother into his opportunity to capture the Chalukya throne.

== Vikramaditya's Opportunism ==
Vikramaditya saw the opportunity presented by the confusion in the kingdom due to the Chola invasion. Vikramaditya seduced Someshvara's feudatories from their loyalty towards the monarch, and with their aid, entered into negotiations with the Chola king Virarajendra.

Vikramaditya made his alliance with Virarajendra.

== Chalukya civil war ==
The political situation drastically changed when Virarajendra died in 1070 and his son Athirajendra Chola came to the Chola throne. Kulothunga Chola I eventually came to the Chola throne in a confusion created by civil disturbances in which Athirajendra was assassinated. As Vikramaditya was antagonistic towards Kulothunga, Someshvara II went into an alliance with Kulothunga and prepared to attack Vikramaditya.

The conflict eventually occurred in 1075 when Kulothunga launched an attack on Vikramaditya. Someshvara aided Kulothunga Chola by attacking Vikramaditya's rear. What resulted was a brief civil war in which Someshvara suffered heavy defeats and his fate is unknown after the defeat. Vikramaditya captured the Chalukya king and imprisoned him. Vikramaditya VI proclaimed himself the Chalukuya king in 1076.

== Religion ==
During the reign of Someshvara II, several inscriptions indicate continued patronage of Jainism by royal officials and members of the ruling family in the Western Chalukya realm. An inscription dated 1068 records that a Jain general of Someshvara II rebuilt a wooden temple into a stone structure with the support of the king and the provincial ruler Lakṣmaṇa, who also renovated the Jain basadi at Balipuna in the Banavasi region and endowed land to it.

Another inscription dated 1072 states that the queen of Someshvara II renewed the endowment of the village Gudigere for the Anesejjeya basadi, originally built by "Kumkumamahadevi", the younger sister of the Chalukya king Vijayaditya.

== See also ==
- Virarajendra Chola
- Kulothunga Chola I

== Sources ==
- Nilakanta Sastri, K.A. (1955). A History of South India, OUP, New Delhi (Reprinted 2002).
- Nilakanta Sastri, K.A. (1935). The CōĻas, University of Madras, Madras (Reprinted 1984).
- Dr. Suryanath U. Kamat (2001). Concise History of Karnataka, MCC, Bangalore (Reprinted 2002).
- Singh, Ram Bhushan Prasad (1974). Jainism in Early Medieval Karnataka. Delhi: Motilal Banarsidass. Available at: https://archive.org/details/in.ernet.dli.2015.65384
