= Karunakara Tondaiman =

11th century Chola Empire general

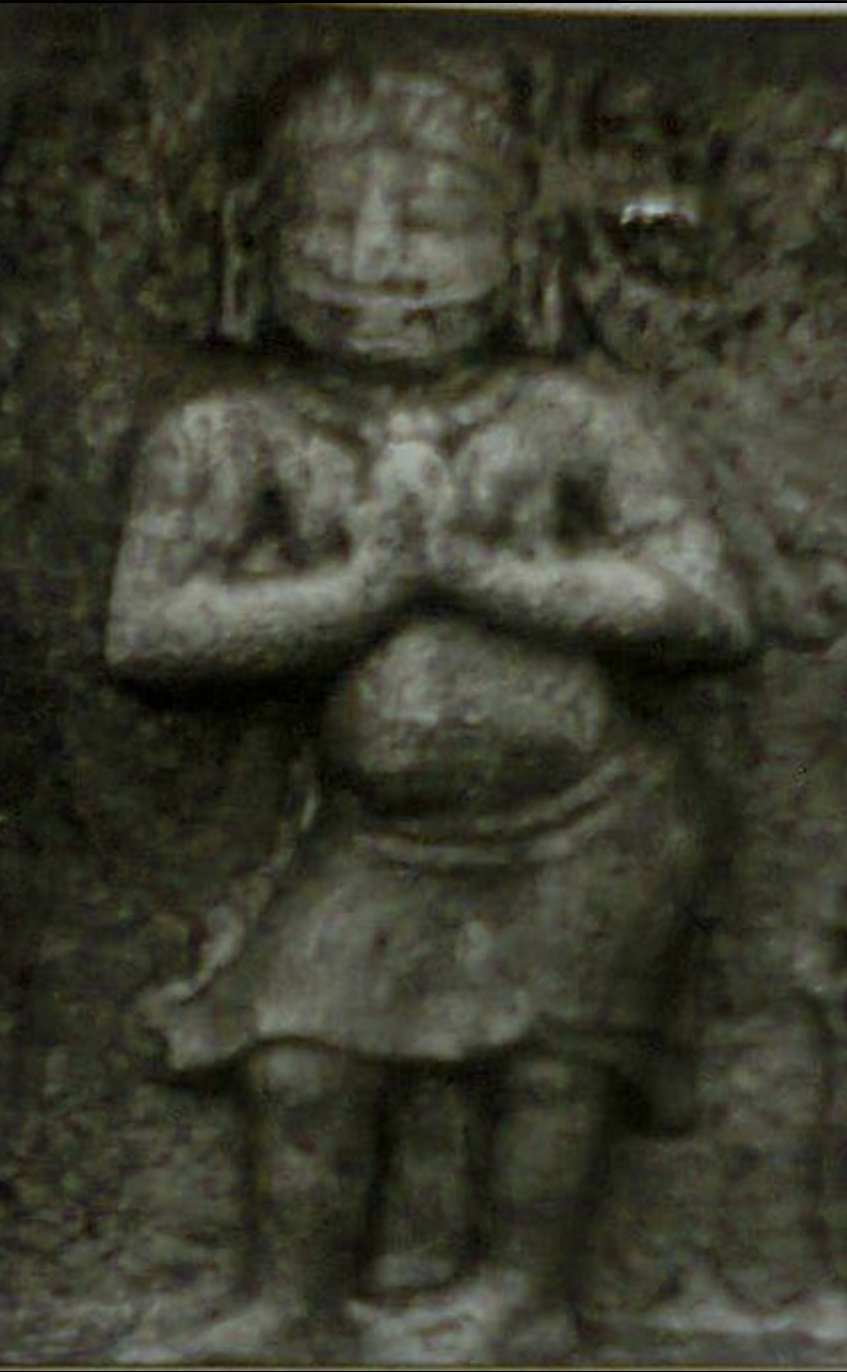
- Sculpture of Karunakara Tondaiman at Draksharama.
- Born: Thiruvarangan; Kumbakonam, Chola Empire (modern day Tamil Nadu, India)
- Died: Gangaikonda Cholapuram, Chola Empire (modern day Jayankondam, Tamil Nadu, India)
- Spouse: Alagiyamanavalini Mangai Ālvār
- Military career
- Allegiance: Chola Empire
- Branch: Chola army
- Rank: Senathipathi
- Commands: Chola Army in Sri Lanka and Kalinga
- Conflicts: Sinhalese Revolts (1070); Invasion of Kalinga, 1097; Invasion of Kalinga, 1110; Chalukya–Chola wars (1070–1120)

Karunakara Tondaiman was a general of Chola Emperor Kulottunga I. He is renowned for leading the Chola invasion of Kalinga during the reign of Kulottunga I and is the hero of Jayamkondar's poem Kalingattuparani In the Parani poem he is referred to as the lord of Vandai. while in the Draksharamam inscription of Kulottunga I, he is called as Vanduvaraja and Pallavaraja. He also served as a minister under Kulothunga Chola's son and successor, Vikrama Chola.

== Personal life ==
According to the Draksharamam inscription, his personal name was Thiruvarangan and he was the son of Sirilango of Vandalanjeri in Tirunaraiyur-nadu near Kumbakonam. He is described as a sadu(good)-vaishnava and is said to have built a Vishnu temple made of black stone in Alavely. Sir-ilan-kō is not a proper name but rather means the illustrious Yuvaraja(crown-prince) and is quite often used to refer to Lakshmana in Vaishnavite works. A queen of his called Alagiyamanavalini Mangai Ālvār is known to us from an epigraph in the Varadarajaswami temple in Kanchi.

== Lankan War ==
The Sri Lankan vassal of the Chola kingdom during the reign of Kulottunga Chola I had betrayed the Chola sovereign and had pledged allegiance to the Sinhala king in order to become the sole ruler of the Chola province in Ceylon. When this was brought to the attention of Kulottunga Chola I, the furious king had termed the traitor, "Siva Drohi", figuratively meaning traitor of the (Shaivite) Cholas. Karunakara Tondaiman took this opportunity to show his loyalty and went on to plunder Lanka. The Karunakara Pillaiyar temple in the Jaffna peninsula was built after him. The village, Thondaimanaru, in Ceylon was also named after him.

== Kalinga War ==
The Kalinga kingdom was then ruled by Eastern Ganga king Anantavarman Chodaganga Deva. When Kulottunga Chola held his court at Kanchi, it was brought to his attention that Anantavarman had failed to pay tribute on two occasions to the Chola sovereign. This was taken as a sign of slight for not recognising the Chola superiority and the King dispatched Karunakara Tondaiman to bring the Chalukya to his knees. Kulottunga Chola dispatched Karunakara Tondaiman to capture Anantavarman alive. Vikrama Chola, then a young prince then, was a part of the force under Karunakara Tondaiman.

According to tradition and the Vaishnava point of view, the Lord on (Tirupati) had parted with his conch and the Sudarshana chakra to Karunākara Perumāl, the conqueror of Kalinga and the hero of Jayamkondar's Kalingattuparani. Karunakara Tondaiman defeated the Kalinga armies of Anantavarman and planted a pillar of victory in Kalinga (modern day Odisha). Anantavarman fled, never to be found again. From the Kalingattuparani,

Having thus laid waste the whole of the sea-coast kingdom of Kalinga, and planting there a pillar of victory,
Karunakara Tondaiman, the lord of Vandaiyar, returns and lies at the feet of his master all the spoils of war

Nilakanta Sastri and M. Raghava Iyengar identify Vandainagar with Vanduvangarai near Kumbakonam while Dr. K.V Raman identifies it with Vandalur, an area in Chennai, Tamil Nadu.
