= Karungalakudi =

Neighbourhood in Madurai district, Tamil Nadu, India

- Village
- Location within Tamil Nadu
- Coordinates: 10.1593°N 78.3600°E
- Country: India
- State: Tamil Nadu
- District: Madurai district
- Taluk: Melur

Government
  - Type: Panchayath
  - Body: Kottampatti

Population (2011)
  - Total: 6,842
- Time zone: UTC+5:30 (IST)
- PIN: 625 101
- Telephone Code: 04544

Karungalakudi is a village in Madurai District, Melur Taluk in Tamil Nadu, India. It is administered by the Kottampatti block. "Karu" means black, and "Kudi" means settling.

This was a forest area, full of "Karungali" trees – over a period they were cut down for its higher medicinal value and People settled there and thus called as "Karungali kudi" later became "karungalakudi"

== History ==
The village was ruled by Pandiya and Nayakkar kings. Its location is on the pathway from Pandiya kingdom to Chola kingdom. It was a resting place for the travellers and merchants who crossed the dangerous forests surrounded by this village (Mullai). The merchants employed the village Kallars to safeguard them from brigands. The forests were preserved because they helped protect the territorial safety of Pandiya Dynasty.

According to a Shaivite legend, 8000 Jain followers were impaled by Shaivites on a Kazu (a sharpened 5 feet or taller wooden stick and planted on the ground), however this is generally believed to be mythical and symbolic of a victory of Shaivism over Jainism.

A rock pond, called ThiruChunai located in the west of the village has a Shiva temple, built by Pandiya King Maravarman Sundara Pandyan II and renovated by Nayakkars later.

This village has old Jain beds in nearby caves. Within the caves are inscriptions and a figure of Jain yogi. Archaeologists found Muthumakkal Thazis(large sized urns used to bury old people alive). Their body would shrink to fit the burial urns.

== Demography ==
The Karungalakudi village has population of 6842 of which 3475 are males while 3367 are females as per Population Census 2011. The population is evenly divided between people of Hindu and Muslim religions.

In Karungalakudi village the population of children aged between 0-6 is 738 which makes up 10.79% of total population of village. Average Sex Ratio of Karungalakudi village is 969 which is lower than Tamil Nadu state average of 996. Child Sex Ratio for the Karungalakudi as per census is 813, lower than Tamil Nadu average of 943.

Karungalakudi village has lower literacy rate compared to Tamil Nadu. In 2011, literacy rate of Karungalakudi village was 77.79% compared to 80.09% of Tamil Nadu. In Karungalakudi Male literacy stands at 85.20% while female literacy rate was 70.29%.

As per constitution of India and Panchyati Raaj Act, Karungalakudi village is administrated by Sarpanch (Head of Village) who is elected representative of village.

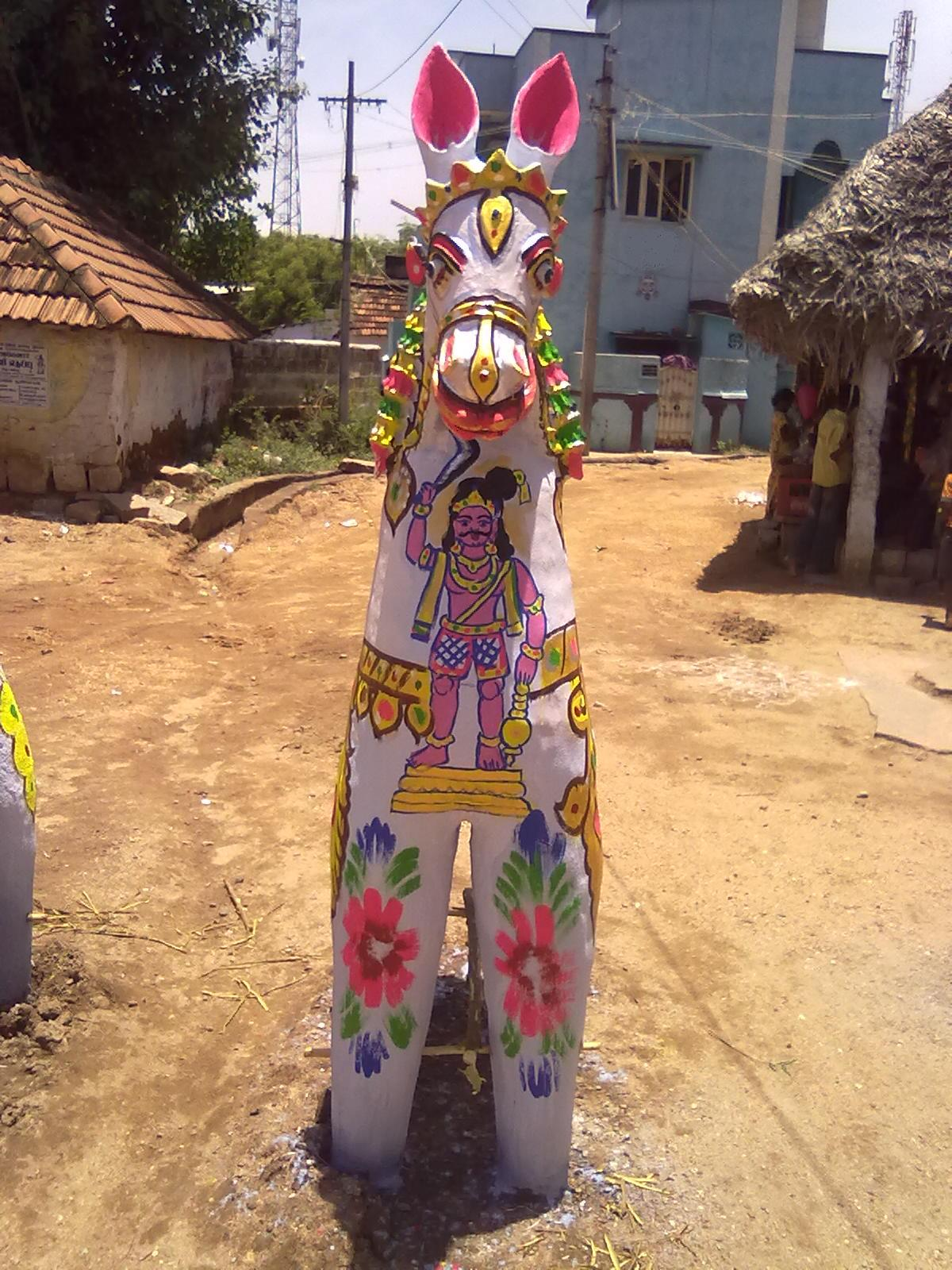
Horse ready for Festival

== Religion ==
Karungalakudi Village exemplifies religious harmony. Villagers partner in festivals. A common temple for the Hindu's near the village at Mandhai.

There is a shrine for the deities Santhi Vinayagar, Sri Sevuga Perumal Ayyanar Swamy, Santhiveeran Swamy, Sonayan Swamy, Aranmanai Karuppa Sami. Vellars (Potters) and Pandarams are entitled to facilitate worship at the shrine. Every visitor brings fruits, flowers and shares to others... after prayer. Every small shrine is maintained by the members of individual groups. The small temple houses of these deities have no statues other than long pieces of iron sickles (weigh 10–20 kg).

== Connectivity of Karungalakudi ==
Public and private bus service is available in the village. There is a railway station available within 10 km walking distance.

== Festivals ==
The coconut flower always decorates the crown of the horse statue freshly made for the festivals. A mirror hangs on the forehead of the horse. The Palace horse is always made prominent and tallest of all. Each horse can be carried only by 8 to 10 people. All horses are carried in a procession and finally installed at Ayyanaar (Head of all deities) Temple that is situated in the limits of the village. A common belief among most of the villagers is that mystical personalities have lived in the village throughout time. Karutha Pakkiri (Black Fakir) was said to perform miracles.

== Pettai ==
The area near the Main road (National highway NH 45B) which serves as the entrance to the village is called Pettai. The main business district of the village runs along Pettai Street. The village is also used for local sandhai, but not extensively. Pettai currently has wide variety of business, due to the recent development of NH45 B
