= Chola invasion of Kalinga (1097) =

1097 Chola military campaign

Date	1097
Location	Kalinga (present-day Odisha)
Result	Chola victory

Belligerents
Chola Empire	Eastern Ganga dynasty

Commanders and leaders
Kulottunga I Karunakara Tondaiman	Unknown

Casualties and losses
- Large number of civilians killed or enslaved

The first Chola invasion of Kalinga by Kulothunga Chola I in 1097 was intended to avenge the invasion of Vengi by the forces of Kalinga. The war resulted in the subjugation of Southern part of Kalinga (between Godavari and Mahendra), and successful suppression of the revolts.

== Causes ==
In 1097, the army of Kalinga invaded the Eastern Chalukyas which was then a vassal of the Cholas. The troops of Kalinga were supported by the chief of Kolanu near Ellore. A huge army under Vikrama Chola was sent to repulse the invaders. The army was supported by troops under the Pandya viceroy, Parantaka Pandya which then defeated the army which made their revolt unsuccessful.

== See also ==
- Chola invasion of Kalinga (1110)
