= List of Nidugal cholas =

The Nidugal Cholas were a dynasty of chiefs who ruled parts of Karnataka during the 8th and 13th centuries. Their stronghold was the hill fortress of Nidugal. The most famous among the line was Irungola deva Chola Maharaja (Irungola II) who had his capital at Henjeru. They were hostile towards the Hoysalas and resisted them, but were subdued for a brief time during the reign of Vishnuvardhana. Later, they once again asserted their independence with the decline of the Chola and Hoysala kingdoms. They bore titles such as Lord of Uraiyur (the early Chola capital) and claimed descent from the Sangam age king Karikala Chola.

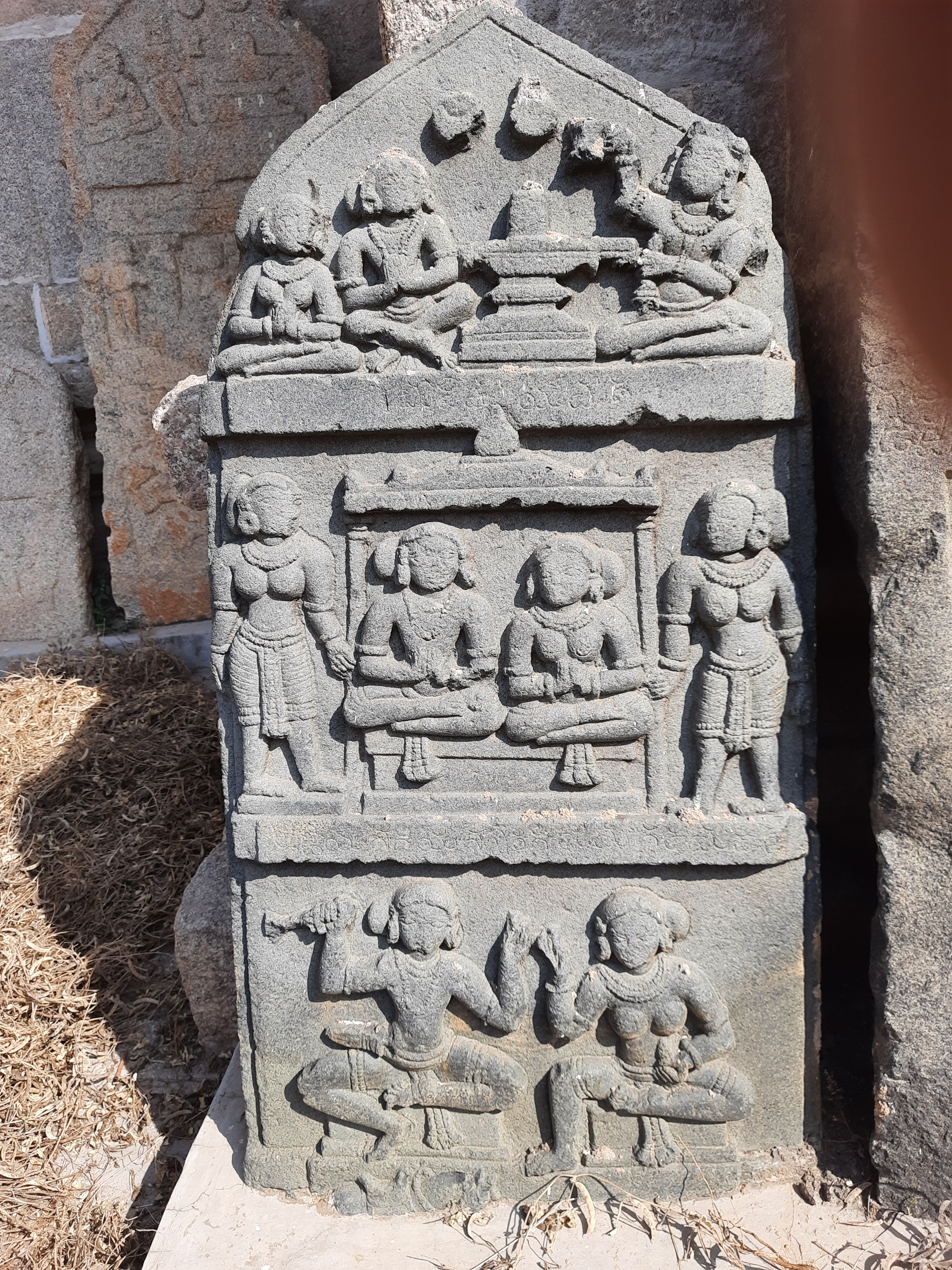
A hero stone at Nidugal Fort

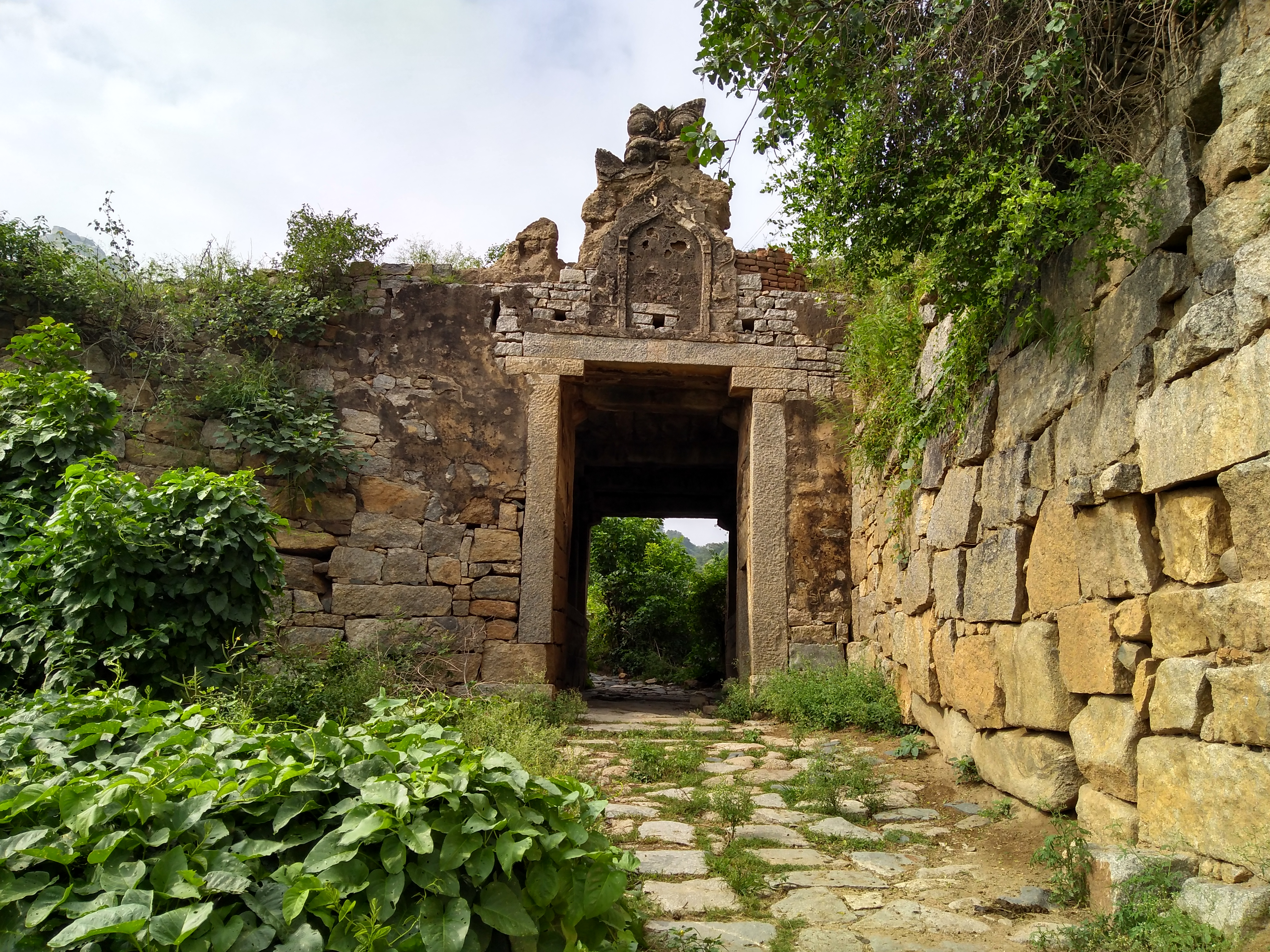
Nidugal Fort Entrance

== Origin ==
It is believed that in earlier times, a prince from the Sangam Chola family moved north into Karnataka and Andhra, where he became a chieftain. Against great odds from other small chieftaincies like that of the Banas, Vaidumbas, Gangas, and Nolamba Pallavas, his descendants persisted for a couple of centuries and most likely formed branches. This family had titles such as "Oreyurpuravaresvara" (Lord of the city of Urayur), according to their increptions.

== History ==
They had governed from Govifidavadi and Henjeru as their respective capitals for almost two centuries, from the start of the lithic era to 1196, before Nidugal became their capital.

Despite the Hoysalas of Dorasamudra's repeated attacks, they never accepted the sovereignty of any imperial authority except the Chalukyas of Kalyana. They also constructed an unassailable fort at Nidugal and Haniya.

Jata is the earliest known member of the Nidugal Chola dynasty; he is attested in the inscription of Irungola II (c. 1232-1280 CE) from Nidugal. Jata, who is thought to have reigned during the start of the eleventh century, was probably a small chief in the Tumkur area who answered to the Nolamba kings of Henjeru. The inscription implies that Jata was involved in local politics and initiated the establishment of the Nidugal Chola dynasty, even though it does not list his precise political accomplishments.

They maintained friendly and loyal relations with the Imperial Cholas.

== Chronological list of rulers ==
The following list is nased on available stone encryption genealogy:

- Jata Chola (11th century A.D.)
- Brahmadeva Chola (1040 A.D.)
- Irivamangarasa Chola (1079–1083 A.D.)
- Bichi Chola
- Govindarasa Chola
- Irungola Chola(1107–1143 Α.)
- Mallideva/Periya Bhoga/Bhogadeva (1143–1196 A.D.)
- Irungola-II (1196–1219 A.D.)
- Bommideva-II/Brahma (1219–1225 A.D.)
- Irungola-III (1225–1280 A.D.)
- Tripurantaka Chola (1262 A.D.)
- Bomma-III (1280 A.D.)
- Perumaladeva Chola (1280–1286 A.D.)
- Nangavve Chola
- Ganesvara Chola (1292 A.D.)
- Irungoladeva-IV (1310–1320 A.D.)
- Bachimadeva-IV (1292–1310 A.D.)
- Nachayanayaka Chola
- Allapanayaka Chola
- Sadoyyanayaka Chola (Birayya) Bairarasa (c. 1337 A.D.)
- Kesarasa Chola
- Vijayarasa Chola

== Culture ==
Nidugal Cholas have released a number of stone encryptions inKannada and Sanskrit.

== See also ==
- Irunkōvēl
