= Chola invasion of Kalinga (1110) =

1110 Chola military campaign

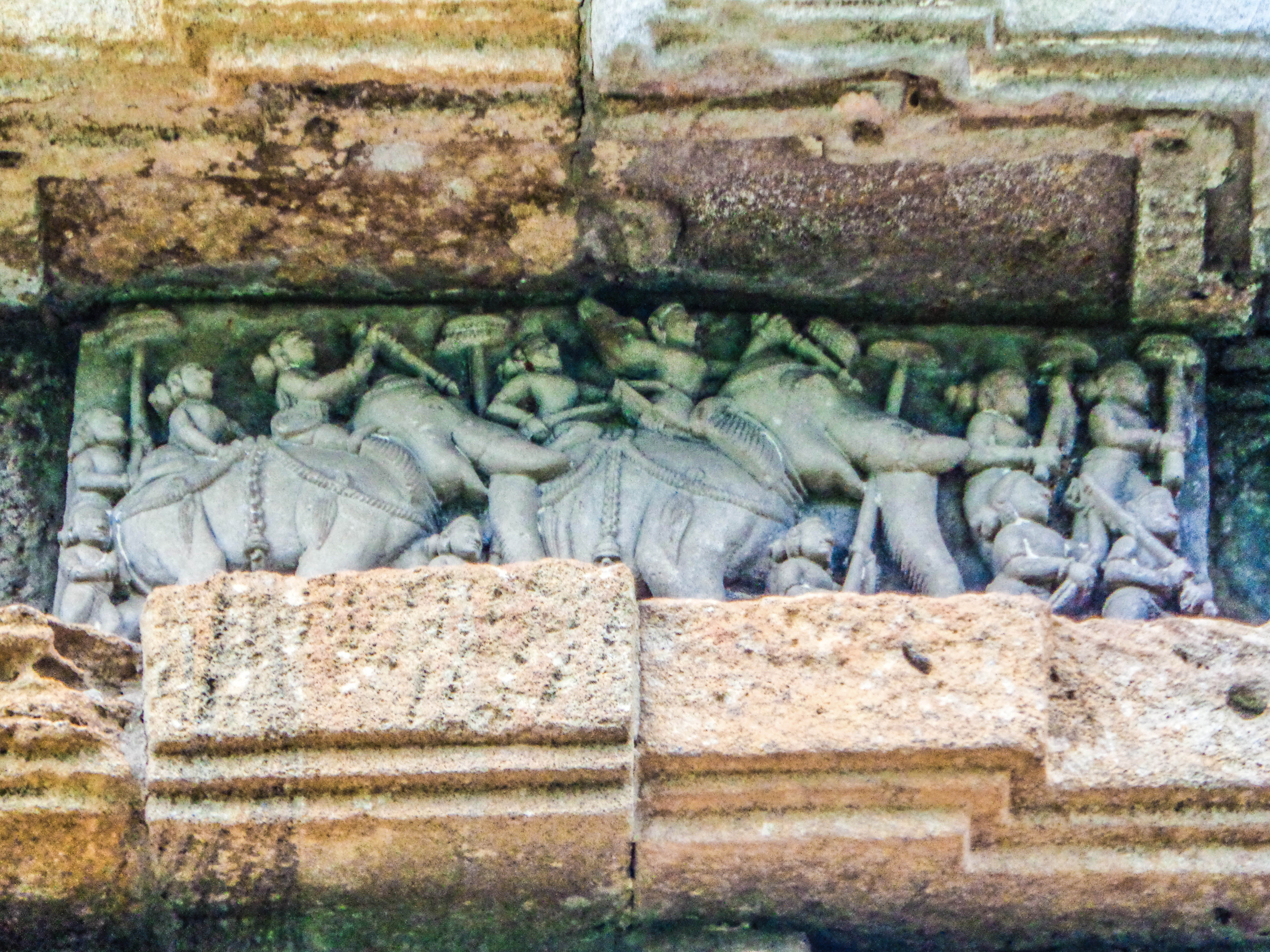
- The Army of Kalinga.
Date	1110 C.E.
Location	Kalinga
Result	Chola victory
Territorial changes	Status quo ante bellum

Belligerents
Chola Empire	Eastern Ganga dynasty

Commanders and leaders
Kulottunga I Karunakara Tondaiman; Vikrama Chola	Anantavarman Chodaganga

Units involved
Chola Navy; Chola Army	

Casualties and losses
unknown	heavy

The Chola invasion of Kalinga in 1110 CE was the second and more famous of the two campaigns against the kingdom of Kalinga undertaken during the reign of Kulothunga I. The forces led by the Pallava chief, Karunakara Tondaiman, achieved an easy victory over the army of Kalinga forcing its king, Anantavarman Chodaganga to flee.However, the second kalinga war led to no annexations. The war and its causes form the subject of the ballad, Kalingattuparani.

== Causes ==
The southern part of Eastern Ganga Dynasty had been subdued in the first Chola invasion of Kalinga and the king had become a vassal of the Cholas paying an annual tribute to the Chola Emperor. When the king of Kalinga, Anantavarman Chodaganga defaulted on payment for two years in a row, Kulothunga Chola I declared a war on him and appointed his Prime Minister and Commander-in-chief, Karunakara Tondaiman to lead an expedition to Kalinga.

== Events ==
Karunakara Tondaiman set out from Kanchipuram in 1110 and crossing the Palar, Pennar, Krishna and Godavari, reached Kalinga. After destroying the elephant corps sent by Anantavarman to arrest his advance, Karunakara Tondaiman plundered and ravaged Kalinga. Anantavarman faced the Chola Army on the battlefield but was defeated and had to flee.The expeditionary force returned with vast booty, but without being able to capture the king of Kalinga.

== See also ==
- Chola invasion of Kalinga (1097)
