= Chodaganga =

Chodaganga is a given name. Notable people with the name include:

- Anantavarman Chodaganga, Eastern Ganga monarch
- Chodaganga of Polonnaruwa, king of Polonnaruwa
