= Athirajendra =

Chola emperor in 1070

- KoParakesarivarman

Chola Emperor
- Reign: 1070 – June 1070 (few months)
- Predecessor: Virarajendra
- Successor: Kulothunga I
- Born: 1020; Gangaikonda Cholapuram, Chola Empire (modern day Jayankondam, Tamil Nadu, India)
- Died: June 1070 (aged 50); Gangaikonda Cholapuram, Chola Empire (modern day Jayankondam, Tamil Nadu, India)
- Empress: Unknown
- Issue: Unknown
- Dynasty: Chola
- Father: Virarajendra
- Mother: Arulmolinangai
- Religion: Hinduism

Athirajendra (1020 – June 1070) reigned for a very short period of few months as the Chola king succeeding his father Virarajendra. His reign was marked by civil unrest, possibly religious in nature. Athirajendra was last clan of Chola dynasty. He was killed in the religious chaos. Athirajindra and Virarajendra interfered in the Vengi succession disputes after the Vengi king Rajaraja Narendra, who was closely related to the Chola clan through his mother Kundavai, a daughter of Rajaraja Chola, died in 1061. The Vengi throne went to Saktivarman II in a palace coup. The Cholas wanted the Chola influence re-established in Vengi. Saktivarman II was killed, but Vijayaditya, Saktivarman's father assumed the throne and repulsed the Chola attempts at unseating him. Vijayaditya however accepted to serving as a Chola vassal.

Although this attempt at gaining total control over Vengi was unsuccessful, Virarajendra found another Chalukya ally in Vikramaditya by marrying his daughter to him.

While these intrigues were going on, the son of Rajaraja Narendra, prince Rajendra Chalukya later known as Kulothunga I sought to become the Vengi king and felt Vijayaditya had usurped the throne that was rightfully his. The Cholas probably helped him in his efforts. Thwarted in his attempts by his uncle Vijayaditya, Kulothunga Chola carved himself a small dominion near Baster District in Chhattisgarh state and bided his time. An opportunity arose with the demise of Virarajendra and Rajendra Chalukya acted swiftly to capture the Chola throne.

== Chola and Eastern Chalukya unity ==
As a result of several intermarriages over a period of time when Rajaraja Chola gave his daughter Kundavai in marriage to Eastern Chalukya Vimaladitya, The Chola clan and the Vengi branch of the Chalukyan dynasty had become very close and the Vengi kings had become plainly Cholas at heart. Virarajendra Chola interfered in the Vengi succession disputes after the Vengi king Rajaraja Narendra, who was closely related to the Chola clan through his mother Kundavai, a daughter of Rajaraja Chola, died in 1061. The Vengi throne went to Saktivarman II in a palace coup. The Cholas wanted the Chola influence re-established in Vengi. Saktivarman II was killed, but Vijayaditya, Saktivarman's father assumed the throne and repulsed the Chola attempts at unseating him. Vijayaditya however accepted to serve as a Chola vassal.

Although this attempt at gaining total control over Vengi was unsuccessful, Virarajendra found another Chalukya ally in Vikramaditya by marrying his daughter to him.

While these intrigues were going on, the son of Rajaraja Narendra, Prince Rajendra Chalukya (the future Kulothunga Chola I) sought to become the Vengi king and felt Vijayaditya had usurped the throne that was rightfully his. The Cholas probably helped him in his efforts. Thwarted in his attempts by his uncle Vijayaditya, Rajendra Chalukya carved himself a small dominion near Baster District in Chhattisgarh state and bided his time. An opportunity arose with the demise of Virarajendra and Rajendra Chalukya acted swiftly to capture the Chola throne.

== Vengi dynastic struggles ==
Cholas were also involved in the dynastic struggles of the Vengi throne, intermittently fighting on the sides of their favourite prince against a rival. These rivals were more often than not supported by the Western Chalukyas. Therefore, the Eastern Chalukyan kingdom had been a venue for a proxy war between the Cholas, and the Western Chalukyas for generations.

== Death ==
The Chalukya author Bilhana gives a version of the background to Athirajendra's troubles in his Vikramankadeva Charita. Soon after marrying his daughter to Chalukya Vikramaditya VI, Virarajendra Chola died. On hearing news of trouble and revolt in the Chola country following the emperor's death, Vikramaditya, immediately marched to Kanchipuram to quell troubles there. Then he went to Gangaikonda Cholapuram, ‘destroyed the forces of the enemy and installed the prince (Athirajendra) on the throne’. After spending a month in the Chola capital, Vikramaditya VI apparently satisfied that peace was restored, returned to his country.

Within a few days of his return, news about the death of Athirajendra in a fresh outbreak of rebellion reached him. The news also told him that Rajendra, son of Narendra and grandson of Rajendra Chola, had captured the Chola throne and assumed the title of Kulothunga Chola I. Vikramaditya immediately marched against Kulothunga. Someshvara II, the Western Chalukya king also joined him.

The ascension of Kulothunga Chola marks the first time after Vijayalaya Chola that a person from the dynasty's maternal lineage ascended the Chola throne. Other descendants of Cholas survived (through two different branches stemming from the many sons of Rajadhiraja Chola I and the six sons of Rajendra Chola II) for many more centuries to come.

=== Religious troubles ===
Attempts have also been made to connect these internal disturbances in the Chola kingdom with the history of the persecution suffered by Ramanuja in the hands of the Cholas. It is possible to come to an assumption, based on early biographical works on Ramanuja, that the Chola monarch who subjected Ramanuja and his followers to persecution was Athirajendra or his father Virarajendra. According to Nilakanta Sastri, Krimikanta Chola, the persecutor of Ramanuja was Adhirajendra and he died in a local uprising of the Vaishnavas. This identification lends credence to the content of Divyasuricharitam, according to which the Chola family or line ended as the king was cursed for being intolerant.

== Notes ==
Preceded by Virarajendra Chola	Chola; 1067–1070 CE	Succeeded by Kulothunga Chola I
