= Kalingattuparani =

12th-century poem by Jayamkondar

- Author: Jayamkondar
- Language: Tamil
- Genre: Epic poetry
- Published: after 1110 CE
- Publication place: India

Kalingattuparani (Tamil: கலிங்கத்துப்பரணி) is a 12th-century Tamil poem and a war song by Jayamkondar, celebrating the victory of Kulottunga Chola I over the Kalinga king, Anantavarman Chodaganga in the Chola-Kalinga war. Parani is a type of literature that is written about a king (or a general) who kills a thousand elephants in a war. It is customary to name this type of poem after the one who was defeated.

== Premise ==
Kalingattuparani depicts the Chola invasion of Kalinga under the command of Karunakara Tondaiman in which a thousand elephants are slain. It gives a vivid and a graphic description of battle scenes as well as scenes of ghosts cooking gruel in the fields and surrounding themselves with the bodies of fallen soldiers, elephants and horses. It is hailed as one of the master-pieces of Tamil literature with its majestic style and diction.

== Plot ==
The warriors who return from the war found the doors of their household closed and they ask the women to open them. Meanwhile goblins who witnessed the battle narrate the story to the goddess Kali who resides in the forest. The poem contains thirteen parts:

- கடவுள் வாழ்த்து (Invocation)
- கடை திறப்பு (Open the doors)
- காடு பாடியது (In praise of the forest where Kali dwells)
- கோயில் பாடியது (In praise of the Kali temple)
- தேவியைப் பாடியது (In praise of Kali)
- பேய்ப்பாடியது (In praise of the attendant spirits of Kali)
- இந்திரசாலம் (Jugglery)
- இராச பாரம்பரியம் (Lineage of the Chola kings in which Kulothunga was born)
- பேய் முறைப்பாடு (Goblins appeal to gracious consort, representing their intense hunger)
- அவதாரம் (Incarnation of Kulothunga)
- காளிக்குக் கூளி கூறியது (Golblin narrates to Kali)
- போர் பாடியது (Description of battle scenes)
- களம் பாடியது (Of the heroic deeds in the battlefield)

== Structure ==
Jayamkondar, the court poet, touches on various sections such as lineage of the king, his birth, his family, the training in warfare that he received as a child, his accession to the throne, his exploits and his subsequent move to the city of Kanchi.

The author then proceeds to explain the training that Kulothunga received in warfare and his heroics in Vayiragaram and Chakrakottam while he was still young. Next he proceeds to talk about his queens and how one day the king wanted to move his capital to Kanchi. Finally, he touches on the circumstances which led to the Kalinga war.

== English translation ==
An English rendering of Kalingattuparani is done by E.S. Muthuswamy.

== In popular media ==
In the 2010 Tamil movie Raavanan, four stanzas from the 12 part have been used.
