= Parani (Tamil literature genre) =

Parani is one of the 96 minor literary genres collectively known as ‘Sittrilakkiyam’ in Tamil.

The earliest examples of Parani Ilakkiyam (grammar) are traced to the 11th century A.D. A Parani celebrates the valour and heroism of a king or a soldier who has won a great battle after slaying 1,000 elephants. An interesting feature of Parani is that they are named not after the victorious, but after the vanquished or the place of the battle.

‘Kalingattuparani’, ‘Thakkayaagap Parani’, Iranyavathaip Parani’, Kanjavathaip Parani’, and ‘Mohavathaip Parani’ are some popular Parani texts.
