= Jayamkondar =

Jayamkondar was the poet laureate of Kulottunga Chola I. He is renowned for the poem Kalingattu parani, in which he describes the Chola-Kalinga war and celebrates the victory of the Chola king.

== See also ==
- Karunakara Thondaiman
