= Thiruvilandur Copper Plate =

Chola copper-plate inscription

Thiruvilandur Copper Plate, is a royal land-grant charter of the medieval Chola dynasty, issued during the reigns of Rajadhiraja Chola I and his younger brother Rajendra Chola II. The copper-plate inscription was discovered on 20 May 2010 at Kazhukani Muttam, a hamlet of Thiruvilandur (also spelled Tiruvindalur or Thiruindalur) a residential neighbourhood and suburb of Mayiladuthurai. It was found during excavation work undertaken in connection with the renovation and Kumbhabhishekham of the Kailasanathar Temple at the village Kazhukani Muttam. The site is located in present-day Mayiladuthurai district, Tamil Nadu, which was formerly part of Nagapattinam and Thanjavur districts.

== Overview ==
The copper-plate inscription were discovered on 20 May 2010, during excavation for a new front mandapa at the Kailasanathar Temple, a late Chola-period Shiva temple at Kazhukani Muttam. The work was undertaken by the Hindu Religious and Charitable Endowments Department, Government of Tamil Nadu.

The Thiruvilandur plates provide detailed information on the Chola state during the mid-11th century. They record the establishment of a large Brahmadeya a tax free settlement and describe the administration of land, taxation, irrigation, local assemblies and the distribution of land grants within the Chola administrative system.

The Thiruvilandur Copper Plates comprise 85 surviving rectangular plates, originally numbering 86. The plates are held together by a large copper ring measuring approximately 50 cm (20 in) in diameter and 2.54 cm (1.00 in) in thickness, bearing a royal seal. The complete set weighs about 150 kg (330 lb). On the basis of the number of plates and its weight, it is larger than the previously regarded largest Chola copper-plate charters, including the Karandai copper plates of Rajendra Chola I, which consist of 57 plates and weigh about 111.73 kg (246.3 lb), and the Tiruvalangadu copper plates, also issued during his reign, which consist of 31 plates and weigh about 92.05 kg (202.9 lb). The seal bears the Chola tiger emblem, accompanied by the two fish associated with the Pandya symbol and a bow.

The charter records tax-free village grants (Brahmadeya) made during the reigns of two successive Chola rulers, Rajadhiraja Chola I and his younger brother Rajendra Chola II, to Brahmins. The charter was formally engraved and issued during the reign of a third ruler, Virarajendra Chola, in his second regnal year, corresponding to approximately AD 1065.

The inscription is divided into two linguistic sections. The Sanskrit portion, comprising 202 verses in 272 lines and written in Grantha script, occupies both sides of the first eight plates and part of the ninth. It consists primarily of a royal praśasti, or courtly eulogy, composed in classical Sanskrit verse. From partway through the ninth plate, the remaining plates, up to plate 85, contain the substantially longer Tamil section, written in Tamil script. This section records the operative details of the grants, including the villages, land measurements, beneficiaries, officials and administrative procedures, in the form of Tamil prose characteristic of Chola-period revenue records.

== Charter and plate inscriptions ==
The copper-plate charter brings together two major tax-free village grants associated with Rajadhiraja Chola I and his younger brother Rajendra Chola II, along with subsidiary grants and subsequent administrative actions. The preamble of the charter is divided into two sections, a mythological genealogy and a historical genealogy of the Chola rulers.

The mythological section traces the Chola lineage through rulers including Rudrajit, Chandrajit, Sibi, Chola Parakesari and Rajakesari, Peru-Narkilli, Chenni, Karikala, Kochengannan and Manoratha.

The historical section begins with Vijayalaya Chola (c. 850–871), followed by Aditya I (c. 871–907), Parantaka I (c. 907–955), Gandaraditya (c. 955–956), Arinjaya Chola (c. 956–957), Sundara Chola (c. 957–970), Rajaraja I (985–1014), Rajendra Chola I (1012–1044), Rajadhiraja Chola I, and Rajendra Chola II. The genealogy places the grants recorded in the charter within the succession of Chola rulers and provides a dynastic context for the document.

== Political background ==
The account of Rajendra Chola I briefly describes his campaigns against the Western Chalukyas, his expedition to Sri Lanka, the establishment of the new capital at Gangaikonda Cholapuram, and the Chola invasion of Southeast Asia Kadaram expedition, before turning to the succession of his son Rajadhiraja Chola I.

According to the account, Rajendra I's final instructions to his ministers concerned his younger son Dabhrasabhapati, later Rajendra Chola II, whom he is said to have directed the ministers to make king after his death. The ministers initially understood this as an instruction to arrange Dabhrasabhapati's accession. Dabhrasabhapati, however, declined on the grounds that his elder brother Rajadhiraja was senior to him. Rajadhiraja, who was then administering the Pandya region, subsequently succeeded Rajendra I. The author suggests that the original text may contain scribal errors and interprets Rajendra I's instructions as referring to Dabhrasabhapati's appointment as yuvaraja rather than his succession to the throne.

The account then describes the Battle of Koppam, fought between the Cholas and the Western Chalukyas during the reign of Rajadhiraja I. Rajadhiraja led the Chola forces in a campaign against the Chalukya ruler Someshvara I, advancing towards the Chalukya capital of Kalyani (Chalukya capital). The Chola army subsequently proceeded towards Kollapura while pursuing the retreating Chalukya forces. Someshvara later regrouped his forces and confronted the Cholas at Koppam on the banks of the Krishna River. Rajadhiraja I, was killed during the battle of Koppam while fighting from his elephant.

His younger brother Rajendra II, who was commanding another division of the Chola army, then assumed command of the forces. He rallied the Chola army and continued the battle against the Chalukyas, resulting in the withdrawal of Someshvara. The Cholas took war booty, including elephants and royal insignia. According to the literary account, Rajendra II did not pursue Someshvara after his withdrawal from the battlefield. He subsequently performed a vijayabhisheka, or victory ceremony, at Koppam. Inscriptions at Tiruvallam and Manimangalam also refer to this ceremony.

The author distinguishes the vijayabhisheka at Koppam from a formal royal coronation, interpreting it as a ceremony commemorating Rajendra II's military victory rather than his accession to the Chola throne.

Following the Battle of Koppam, Rajendra II returned to the Chola capital with the captured wealth and war booty. He was subsequently crowned according to royal custom, with sacred water brought by various rulers and from rivers, seas and lakes. He received the traditional Chola crown and royal insignia and assumed the regnal name Rajendradeva. The account presents this ceremony as his formal accession to the Chola throne, following his earlier assumption of command at Koppam.

== Royal grants ==
The charter records three interrelated grants made at different times during the reigns of three successive Chola rulers. The grants span approximately a decade and were incorporated into a single charter.

=== First grant ===
The first grant was issued by Rajadhiraja I on the 40th day of his 35th regnal year, corresponding to approximately AD 1052–1053. The editors suggest that the grant was made at the instance of his younger brother, the future Rajendra II. The order was issued from the royal palace at Mudikonda Cholapuram, identified with Pazhayarai, and was communicated to the authorities of Thiruvilandur-Nadu and representatives of Brahmadeya, Devadana and other institutional landholding groups.

The grant brought ten villages together to form a single tax-free agrahara comprising approximately 320 velis (2,060 acres (3.22 sq mi)) of land. The settlement was named Cholakulanarayana-agrahara and was granted to Brahmin scholars.

=== Second grant ===
The second and principal grant was issued by Rajendra II after his coronation, on the 69th day of his fourth regnal year, corresponding to AD 1058. The order was issued from the "Chola-Kerala" hall of his palace at Gangaikonda Cholapuram. It added 34 villages to those included in the earlier grant and renamed the enlarged settlement Rajendra-agrahara after the king. The grant was made for the support of 130 Chaturvedi Brahmins learned in the Vedas and Shastras.

=== Third grant ===
The third grant was issued during the reign of Rajendra II's younger brother and successor, Virarajendra, in his second regnal year, corresponding to AD 1065. Issued on the 89th day of the regnal year, approximately seven years after Rajendra II's grant, it records the restoration of an earlier land grant given as abhishekadakshina to Brahmadeva. It also records a new tax-free land grant to the poet Chandrabhishana at Gangaikondacholapuram.

== Associated archaeological finds ==
The excavation uncovered not only the copper-plate charter but also a hoard of bronze icons, including images of Ganesha, Somaskanda, Chandrasekhara with his consort, Chandikeshvara, and the Nayanar saints Appar, Tirujnanasambandhar, Sundarar with his consorts Paravai and Sangili, Manikkavachakar and Karaikkal Ammaiyar. The finds also included a lamp finial, ritual vessels and other temple objects. The archaeological material were kept at Government Museum in Chennai for preservation and study.

== See also ==
- King Rajendra I Chola Charter
- Parimala Ranganatha Perumal Temple
- Mayuranathaswami Temple
- Koorai silk saree

== Bibliography ==
- Subbarayalu, Y. (1973). Political Geography of the Chola Country. Madras: State Department of Archaeology, Government of Tamil Nadu.
