= Battle of Kudal-Sangamam =

Battle in India in 1062

First Battle of Kudal-Sangamam
- Part of Chalukya–Chola wars
Date	1062
Location	Kudal-Sangamam
Result	Chola victory

Belligerents
Western Chalukyas	Chola Empire

Commanders and leaders
Someshvara I	Rajendra Chola II

Strength
Unknown	Unknown

The First Battle of Kudal-Sangamam was fought in 1062 by the forces of the Chola king Rajendra Chola II and the Western Chalukya king Someshvara I at Kudal-Sangamam, where the Krishna and the Tungabhadra meet.

== Causes ==
To avenge the Battle of Koppam, the Western Chalukya king Someshvara I set out with a large force led by his army commander or dandanatha, Valadeva. The forces met with the Chola army led by Rajendra Chola II at Mudukkaru or Kudal-Sangamam at the junction of the rivers Krishna and Tungabhadra.

== Events ==
Rajendra Chola was supported by the heir apparent Rajamahendra and the king's brother, Virarajendra. Someshvara's sons Vikkalan and Singanan were defeated and forced to flee. The battle ended with a total victory for the Chola army.

A detailed description of the battle is given in the early inscriptions of Virarajendra's reign

(He) drove from the battlefield in Gangapāḍi into the Tungabhadrā the Mahāsāmantas, whose strong hands (wielded) cruel bows, along with Vikkalan who fought under (his) banner at the head of the battle. (He) attacked and destroyed the irresistible, great and powerful army which he (viz. Vikkalan) had again despatched into Vēngai-nāḍu;..
The enemy, full of hatred, met and fought against (him) yet a third time, hoping that (his former) defeats would be revenged. (The king) defeated countless sāmantas, together with these (two) sons of Āhavamalla, who were called Vikkalan and Śiṇganan, at Kudal-Śangamam on the turbid river. Having sent the brave van-guard in advance, and having himself remained close behind with the kings allied to him, he agitated by means of a single mast elephant that army (of the enemy), which was arrayed (for battle), (and which) resembled the norther ocean. In front of the banner troop, (he) cut to pieces Śingan, (the king) of warlike Kōsalai; along with the furious elephants of his van-guard. While Kēśava-daṇḍanāyaka, Kēttaraśan, Mārayan of great strength, the strong Pōttarayan and (Irēccayan) were fighting, he shouted "(Follow) Mūvēndi, (who wears) a garland of gold!" and cut to pieces many sāmantas, who were deprived of weapons of war. Then Maduvaṇan, who was in command, fled; Vikkalan fled with dishevelled hair; Śiṇgaṇan fled, (his) pride (and) courage forsaking (him); Aṇṇalan and all others descended from the male elephant on which they were fighting in battle, and fled; Āhavamalla, too, to whom (they were) allied, fled before them. (The king) stopped his fast furious elephant, put on the garland of victory, (seized) his (viz. Āhavamalla's) wives, his family treasures, conches, parasols, trumpets, drums, canopies, white cāmaras, the boar-banner, the ornamental arch (makara-tōraṇa), the female elephant (called) Puspaka, and a herd of war-elephants, along with a troop of prancing horses, and, amidst (general) applause, put on the crown of victory, (set with) jewels of red splendour

== Bibliography ==
- Sastri, K. A. Nilakanta (2000) [1935]. The Cōlas. Madras: University of Madras.
- Aiyangar, S. Krishnaswamy (1911). Ancient India. Luzac & Co.
