= Karasangal =

- village
- Location in Chennai, India
- Coordinates: 12.895746°N 80.043606°E
- Country: India
- State: Tamil Nadu
- District: Kancheepuram District
- Metro: Chennai
- Talukas: Sriperumbudur

Government
  - Body: CMDA

Languages
  - Official: Tamil
- Time zone: UTC+5:30 (IST)
- PIN: 601301
- Lok Sabha constituency: Sriperumbudur
- Vidhan Sabha constituency: Sriperumbudur
- Planning agency: CMDA

Karasangal is a village located in South Chennai in the Kancheepuram District of Tamil Nadu, India. It is very close to Chennai city and is 45 km from the famous temple town of Kancheepuram and close to Vandalur and Tambaram. In the 2011 census it had a population of 3858 in 943 households.

The transportation to this village is only through roads and all buses moving towards Padappai will cross Karasangal. The villages Manimangalam and Karasangal are famous for TV Serial shooting spots. Karasangal is famous for the Sivarathri celebration in the Malleshwarar Temple during which 10,008 lamps are lit inside the temple and Puja is performed for the entire night.
