= Madhavaswami =

Madhavaswami (c. 17th or 18th century) was an Indian poet from what is today the state of Tamil Nadu. He wrote in the Marathi language. Madhavaswami lived in Thiruvalandur on the Kaveri River and is known for his verse translations of the Ramayana and the Mahabharata from the Sanskrit to Marathi. Most of Madhavaswami's works are preserved in the Sarasvati Mahal Library in Thanjavur.
