= Battle of Koppam =

1052 battle between the Cholas and Chalukyas

- Part of Chalukya-Chola Wars
Date	28 May 1052
Location	Koppam
Result	Chola victory

Belligerents
Western Chalukyas	Chola Empire

Commanders and leaders
Someshvara I	Rajadhiraja Chola †; Rajendra Chola II

Strength
Unknown	Unknown

Casualties and losses
Jayasimha, Pulakesin, Dasapanman, Nanni-Nulumban	Rajadhiraja Chola

The Battle of Koppam was fought between the Medieval Chola kings Rajadhiraja Chola I and Rajendra Chola II with the Chalukya king Someshvara I in 1054, or in 1052 according to Sen. Though the Cholas were successful in the battle, the king and supreme commander, Rajadhiraja I lost his life in the battlefield and was succeeded to the throne by his younger brother, Rajendra Chola II.

== Sources ==
The Thiruvilandur Copper Plate of Rajadhiraja Chola I and his younger brother Rajendra Chola II records,

Having not got the enemy, the war-thirsty Chola prince withdrew from Kollapura. In the meanwhile, the Andhra (i.e. the Chalukya) king had gathered huge army. Marching with that army, he cried, calling for war, the Chola who was just withdrawing. He called the Chola just like the son of the Sun, i.e. Sugriva, called for fight the mighty Valin” (in an episode in the Ramayana) (v. 69).
Hearing that doubly resounding war-cry of the Chalukya, inviting and provoking for fight, the Chola too collected immediately his powerful army and, returning with equal vigour the enemy’s war-cry, he directly met the mighty army of the enemy (v. 70).
Now broke at the place called Koppam, a terrible battle between the two rivals, viz. the Chola and the lord of the Rattarashtra—the one, the Chola, full of fury on seeing the enemy, who though was already vanquished, yet escaped; and the other, the Chalukya, doubly angry on account of his recent defeat at the hands of the Chola (v. 71).
Here the poet has assigned seven lengthy verses to describe the details of how the different army columns of both the rival sides fought. In that pitched battle, the columns of foot soldiers, horses and elephants of the Chola army fought terribly with their corresponding columns of the army of the enemy. Propelled by great anger, born of sense of shame, because his recent defeat at the hands of the Chola, the enemy fought quite ferociously and aggressively. The Chola too, mounting upon his mighty, formidable elephant, fought very violently and like a forest-fire he burnt off columns of enemy’s army (verses 72–78).
But alas! This forest-fire seated on the back of the elephant was extinguished by the thick clouds of enemy army with their downpour of arrows, i.e. the Chola king Rajadhiraja mounted upon his elephant was killed by Chalukya army by the downpour of arrows (v. 79).”

— Thiruvilandur Copper Plate

The main historic sources of the battle are an inscription dated to 1054 and Rajendra Chola's Manimangalam record of 1055.

Hail! Prosperity! "While the army of his elder brother was at (his) back, the king(who wielded) the sceptre (and) was embraced by (the goddess of) Prosperity, conquered the seven and a half lakshas of Irattapadi. (He) did not meet with opposition in battle; and(his) drum was sounding through the eight directions. Having heard (this) report, (Ahavamalla) proceeded to Koppam on the bank of the great river and fought against (him). (But he) converted into reeking corpses (that) covered the earth the whole warlike army of Ahavamalla. Having perceived this, Ahavamalla became afraid, incurred disgrace and ran away. (The king) (i.e.,Rajendra II) seized his elephants and horses, troops of camels, women and treasures, and anointed himself (in commemoration) of the victory.

— An inscription from the south wall of the Brihadisvara Temple

== Background ==
According to the chola sources and the Thiruvalandur Copper Plate inscriptionDuring the war at Kalyanapura, also known as Kalyani (modern Basavakalyan), Rajadhiraja I personally led the Chola forces. Someshvara I fled when the city was attacked but later returned with an army and renewed the conflict. Rajadhiraja again defeated the Chalukya forces and withdrew towards Kollapura. Someshvara subsequently advanced with a large army, leading to another battle at Koppam, where the Chalukya forces were defeated and Rajadhiraja killed in battle by a barrage of arrows while mounted on his elephant.

Since his accession to the throne, Rajadhiraja Chola desired to subjugate the Chalukyas who ruled over portions of Northern Karnataka and the southern part of present-day Maharashtra and incorporate their territories into the Chola Empire. His first invasion of the Chalukya kingdom in 1047-48 had failed. In 1052, he led a second expedition into the Chalukya territories which met the Chalukya army and fought a battle at place mentioned as "Koppam".

== Battle ==
In 1052, Rajadhiraja led a huge army northward and plundered the province of Rattamandalam. His army was followed in the rear by forces under Rajadhiraja's brother and heir-apparent, Rajendra II. The Chalukya king Someshvara I prepared to meet his enemy and a pitched battle was fought at Koppam. The Chola troops were holding the upper hand when Chalukyan archers shot Rajadhiraja mortally wounding him. The Chola troops panicked and began to retreat when Rajendra II, commanding the reserve forces, personally took command of the army and rallying the Chola forces together, inflicted heavy losses on the Chalukya army forcing Someshvara I to flee. Chola sources record that the elephants, horses and camels of the Chalukyas, along with a huge booty and the queens of Someshvara I fell into the hands of the Cholas. Rajendra II, reportedly, crowned himself on the battlefield and erected a victory pillar at Kolhapur before returning to his country.

== Identification of Koppam ==
The Manimangalam inscription state that Koppam was a city on "the Great River". Fleet has identified it with Khidrapur, 30 miles south-east of Kolhapur, thereby assuming the "Great River" to be the Krishna, while other historians have identified Koppam with a place near Maski.
