= Battle of Manimangala =

642 battle between the Pallavas and Chalukyas

| Location | Manimangalam, India |
| Result | Pallava victory |

Belligerents
| Chalukya dynasty | Pallava dynasty |

Commanders and leaders
| Pulakeshin II | Narasimhavarman I Paranjothi; Manavamma |

The Battle of Manimangala took place between the Pallavas and Chalukyas in the town of Manimangala in 642 AD. Manimangala is the first ever victory for the Pallavas against the Chalukyas and also the first of four successive defeats suffered by Pulakesin II.

== Narasimhavarman Vatapi campaign ==
Following the accession of Narasimhavarman I in 630, the Pallavas began to grow in strength. To quell their rise, the Chalukya king Pulakesin II led a southern campaign defeating the Banas on his way to the Pallava kingdom. Pulakesin proceeded to the town of Manimangala, identified with the present-day Manimangalam, about 20 miles from the Pallava capital Kanchi where he was stopped by a strong Pallava army.

== Events ==
The Kuram plates note that Pulakesin II suffered a defeat and was forced to retreat pursued by the victorious Pallava forces.
