= Utthama Chola =

11th-century governor in Sri Lanka

Utthama Chola Lankeshwaran
- Parakesari Varman

Chola Governor
- Reign: 1059–1072 CE
- Emperor: Rajendra Chola II
- Predecessor: Sangavarman Lankeshwaran
- Successor: Vijayabahu I
- Emperor: Virarajendra Chola

King of Trincomalee
- Reign: 1072–1093 CE
- Predecessor: Sangavarman Lankeshwaran
- Successor: Jayamkonda Chola
- Born: 1018 CE; Thanjavur, Chola Empire (modern day Thanjavur, Tamil Nadu)
- Died: 1093 CE (aged 75); Trincomalee, Sri Lanka
- Issue: Jayamkonda Chola
- House: Cholas
- Dynasty: Chola
- Father: Rajendra Chola II
- Religion: Hindu

Utthama Chola (Utthama Chola Lankeshwaran), was the son of Rajendra Chola II.

== History ==
After the death of Sangavarman Lankeshwaran (the elder brother of Rajendra Chola II) in 1059 CE, Vijayabahu I revolted in an attempt to gain power in Sri Lanka. Rajendra Chola II invaded Sri Lanka to thwart the efforts of his rival, Vijayabahu. After defeating Vijayabahu I and expelling him from Polonnaruwa, in 1059 CE, Rajendra II crowned his son, Utthama Chola, as Governor of the Sinhala (Sri Lanka), with the title "Utthama Chola Lankeshwaran". Utthama Chola ruled over the entire expanse of Sri Lanka as a subordinate of his father from 1059 CE to 1072 CE before taking over Trincomalee, the northern province of Sri Lanka, which he ruled until his death in 1093 CE.
