= Thiruvilandur =

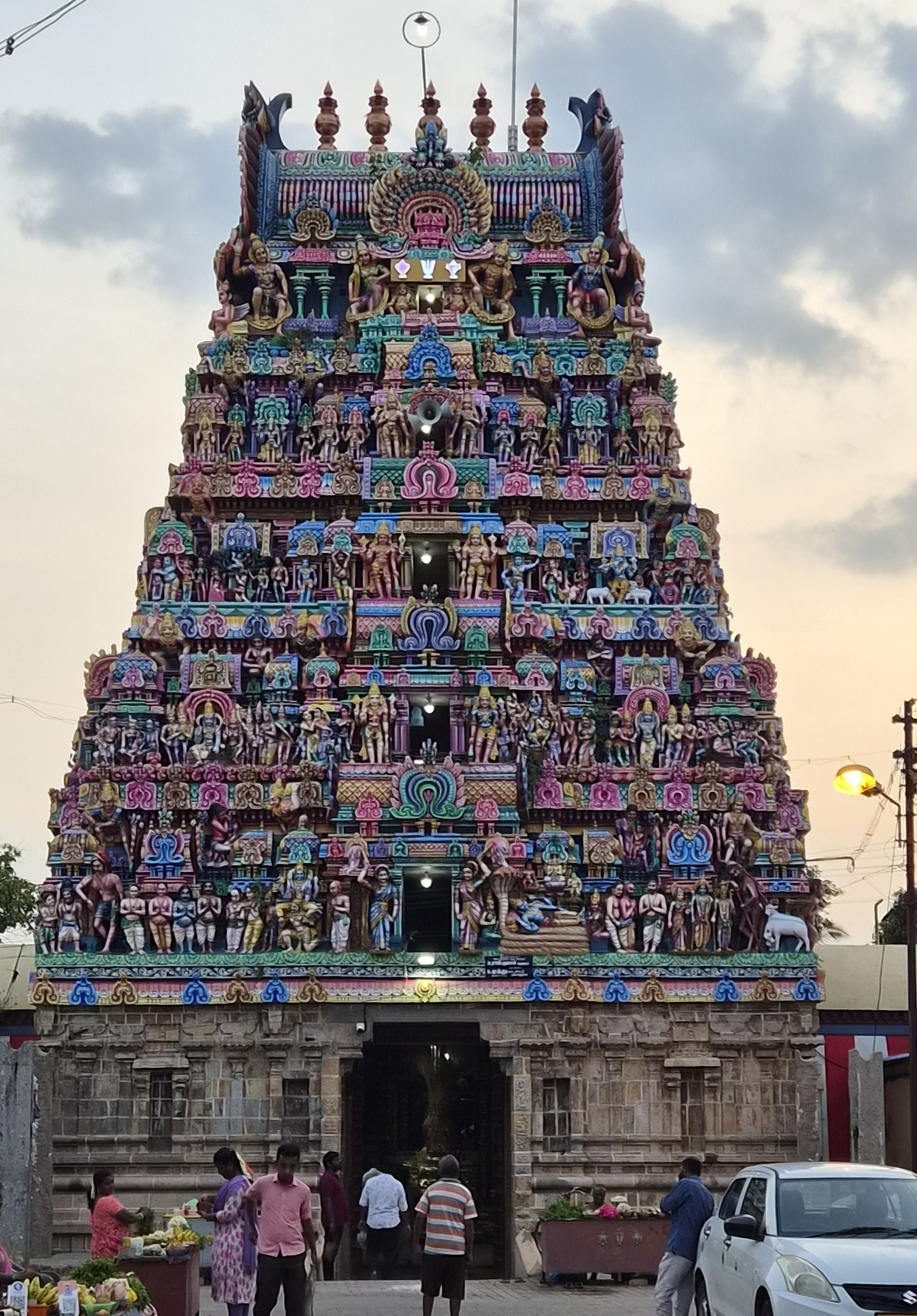
Parimala Ranganatha Perumal Temple, Thiruindalur, Mayiladuthurai.

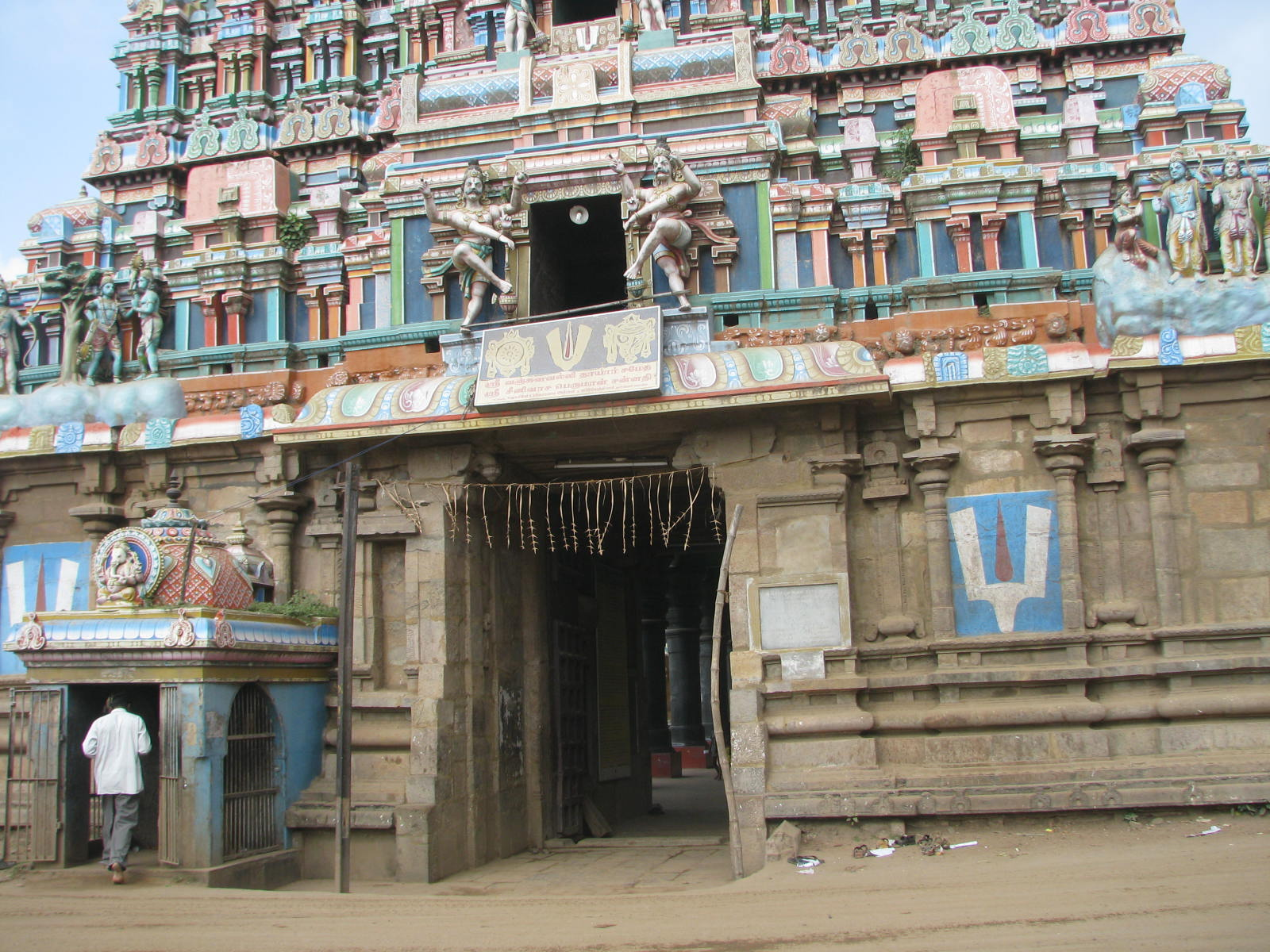
Vishnu Temple at Thiruindalur

Thiruindalur (formerly known as Indalur and Tiruvindalur) is a residential neighbourhood and suburb of Mayiladuthurai in Tamil Nadu, India. It is located within the urban area of Mayiladuthurai.

It is the site of Parimala Ranganatha Perumal Temple.

== History ==
During the Chola period, Thiruvilandur served as the administrative centre of Tiruvindalur-nadu, a nadu-level administrative division. Tiruvindalur-nadu formed part of Rajadhiraja-valanadu, a larger administrative division comparable to a present-day district.

The copper plates royal land-grant charter, issued during the reigns of Rajadhiraja Chola I and his younger brother Rajendra Chola II, were discovered at Kazhukkanimuttam, a hamlet of Thiruvindalur, during excavation at the Kailasanatha temple in 2010. The charter records land grants in Tiruvindalur-nadu, including portions of Thiruvindalur itself, within Rajadhirajavalanadu.

== Etymology ==
The name Indalur (also rendered as Induri) is explained in traditional accounts in several ways. One tradition links it to Chandran (the Moon), who was freed from a curse that had diminished his beauty after visiting the shrine, obtaining Perumal’s grace, and thereby giving the place the name Induri. Another explanation derives the name from the fragrance (parimalam) restored by the local Perumal to the Vedas after they had been stolen and polluted by asuras, the deity is therefore called Parimala Ranganathan, and the place was also known as kingdom of fragrance. Linguistically, “indalam” is said to mean a pure or incense stone (tūyakkal also spelled as dhoobakkal), and the Perumal is compared to such a stone that purified and perfumed the Vedas, leading to the name Indalur. A further local tradition associates the name with fragrant flowers brought by the Devas or with the fragrance that spread from a forest pond at Indalur.
