= Ketaladevi =

Queen consort of the Western Chalukya Empire

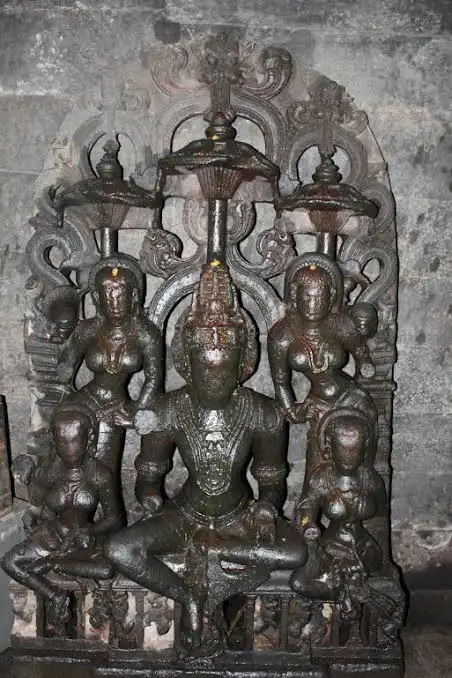
- Ketaladevi and the other consorts of Someshvara seated alongside him, ca.11th century.

Queen consort of the Western Chalukya Empire
- Born: Basavakalyan, Western Chalukya Empire (modern day Karnataka, India)
- Died: Basavakalyan, Western Chalukya Empire (modern day Karnataka, India)
- Spouse: Someshvara I
- House: Chalukya (by marriage)
- Religion: Hinduism

Ketaladevi was Queen consort of the Western Chalukya Dynasty as the wife of Someshwara I. She was known for her piety and generosity, and the great power that she held throughout her husband's reign.

== Life ==
Ketaladevi was the consort of Someshvara I, who became king of the Western Chalukya Empire in 1042. She held an esteemed position and participated in governance alongside his chief consort Mailadevi. She did not beget any children throughout the duration of their marriage.

Ketaladevi held great power in the palace and was beloved by the people. She governed the agrahara of Ponnavada (modern day Honvad, Bijapur District) with Traibhogya rights, which was received with great gratitude by the people. As the ruler of Ponnavada, she was in charge of the administration and made many contributions and endowments. At her request, Someshvara granted and allocated lands and sites for houses to be built for the Thribuvan Tilaka Chaityalaya, where the monks and nuns stayed.

An inscription dated 1062 lists out the gifts presented by Ketaladevi which includes; twenty-five matteru of cultivable land, garden, and an oil mil (gana) meant for offering to the god Siddeshwara. She had instructed a certain Chankiraja to build shrines for Santinatha, Parsva, and Suparsva for the Chaityalaya.
