= Agastheeswarar Temple =

Hindu temple dedicated to Shiva in Agathiyampalli, India

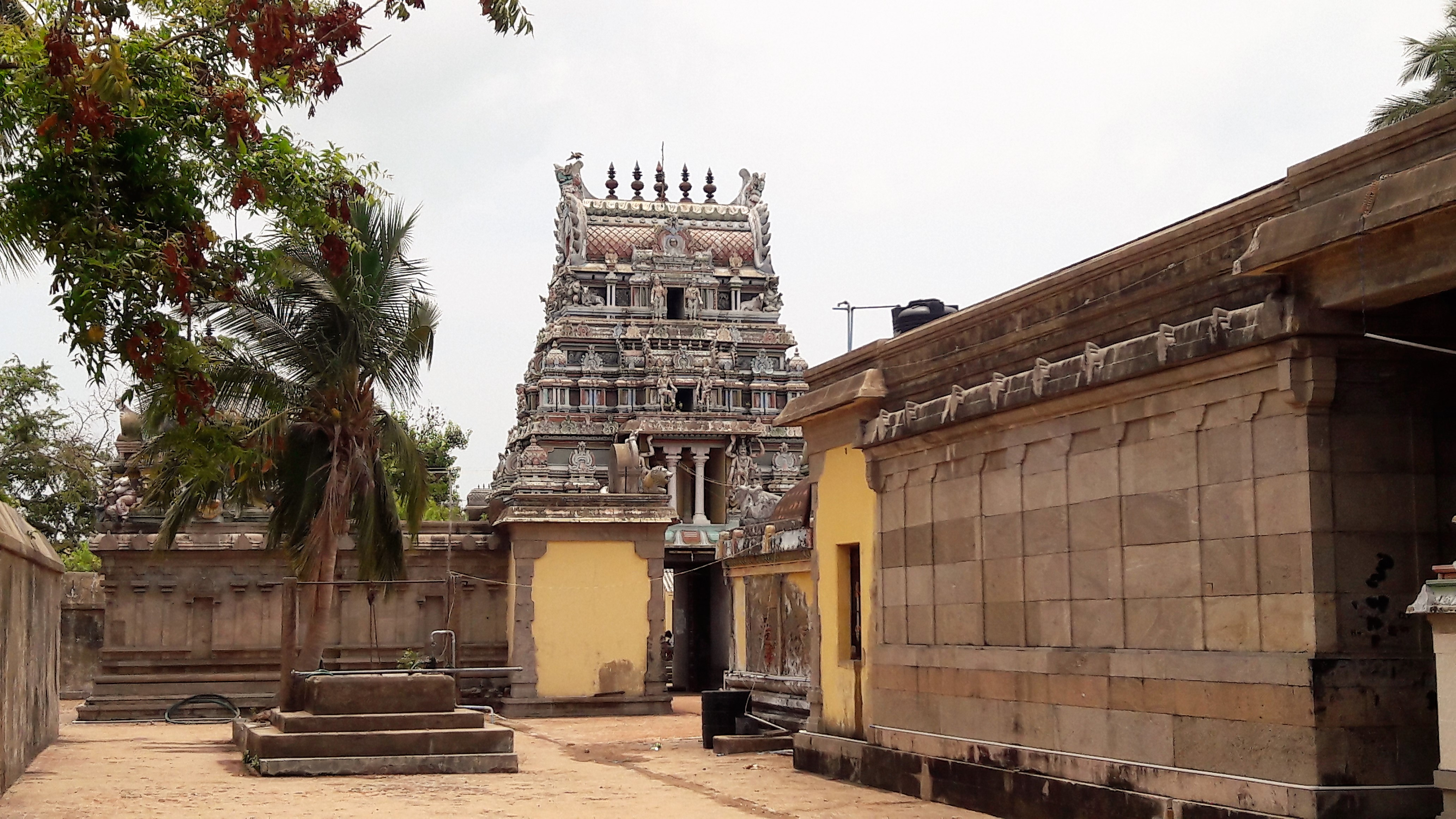
- Image of the Agasthiyampalli temple gopuram

- Location in Tamil Nadu

Religion
- Affiliation: Hinduism
- District: Nagapattinam
- Deity: Agastheeswarar(Shiva)

Location
- Location: Agasthiyampalli
- State: Tamil Nadu
- Country: India
- Coordinates: 10°21′28″N 79°50′48″E

Architecture
- Type: Dravidian architecture

Agastheeswarar Temple (அகஸ்தீஸ்வரர் கோயில்) is a Hindu temple dedicated to Shiva, located in the town of Agasthiyampalli, Nagapattinam district in Tamil Nadu, India. The presiding deity is revered in the seventh century Tamil Saiva canonical work, the Tevaram, written by Tamil saint poets known as the nayanmars and classified as Paadal Petra Sthalam. The temple is locally called Agasthiyar Kovil.

It has several inscriptions dating back to the medieval Chola and later Pandya period. The temple has six daily rituals at various times and three yearly festivals. The temple has several shrines with that of Agastiswara and his consort Pakampiriyal Nayagi being the most prominent. The annual Brahmotsavam (prime festival) is attended by thousands of devotees from far and near.

== Etymology and legend ==
The town Agasthiyanpalli is named after Agastheeswarar, the presiding deity of the Agastheeswarar Temple, a Hindu temple dedicated to Shiva. The seventh century Saiva canonical work Tevaram by Appar and Tirugnanasambandar mentions the place as "Tirumaraikadu".

According to legend, all the Devas were assembled in Kailash to witness the sacred marriage of Shiva and Parvathi and on account of it, the earth tilted towards North. To balance it, Shiva requested sage Agasthiyar to move over to the South. It is believed that Shiva appeared in his marriage form to Agasthiyar at this location.

== History ==
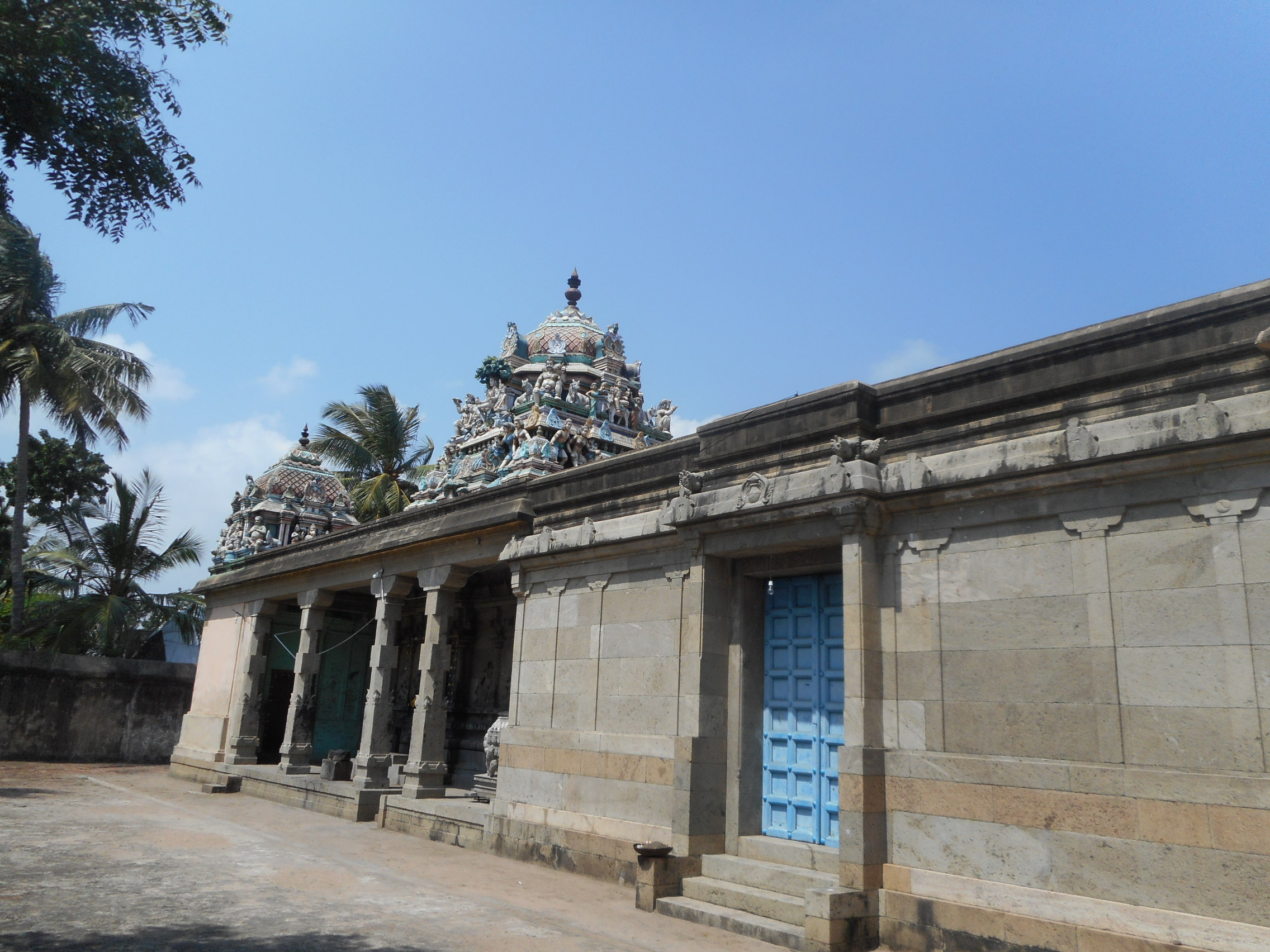
Vimana of the presiding deity

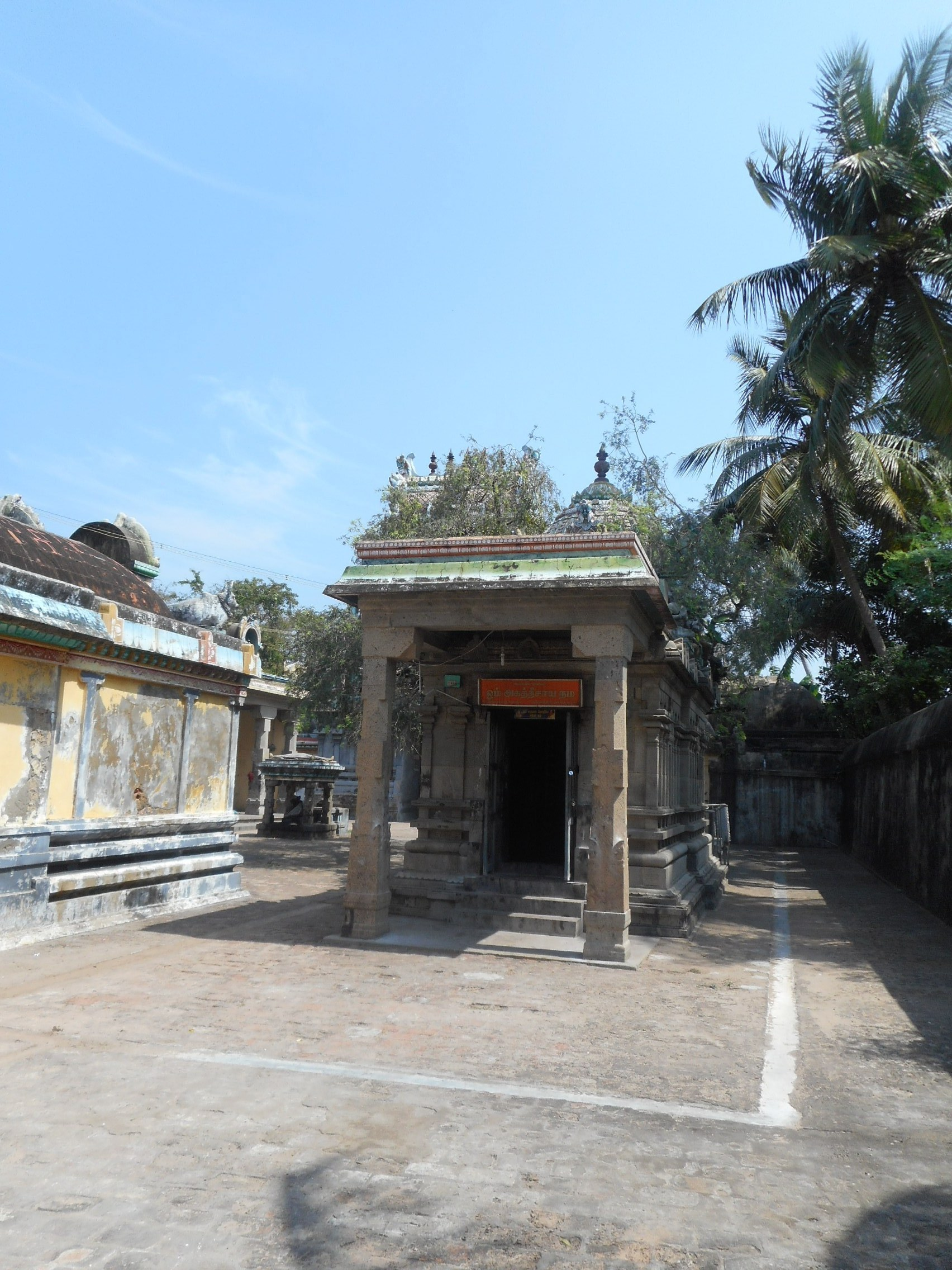
A shrine inside the temple

The recorded history of Agasthiyanpalli and the regions around it is found from the inscriptions in Agastheeswarar Temple and the Vedaranyeswarar Temple. The inscriptions date from the reign of Rajaraja Chola I (985–1014 CE), Rajendra Chola I (1012–1044 CE) and Kulothunga Chola I (1070–1120 CE) indicating various grants to the temple.

Agasthiyanpalli continued to be a part of the Chola Empire and the Chola region emerged as a centre of Saivism during the reign of Kulothunga Chola I (1070–1120 CE). After the fall of Cholas during the reign of Rajendra Chola II in the 13th century CE, the erstwhile Chola region was caught under a power struggle between Pandyas and Hoysalas. The royal patronage continued to the temple during the rule of the Nayaks. The inscriptions from the Pandya king Kulacekarn (1268 - 1309) indicates that he was cured off his ailments after praying at the temple. He constituted a festival at Vedaranyeswarar temple to commemorate the event.

== Architecture ==
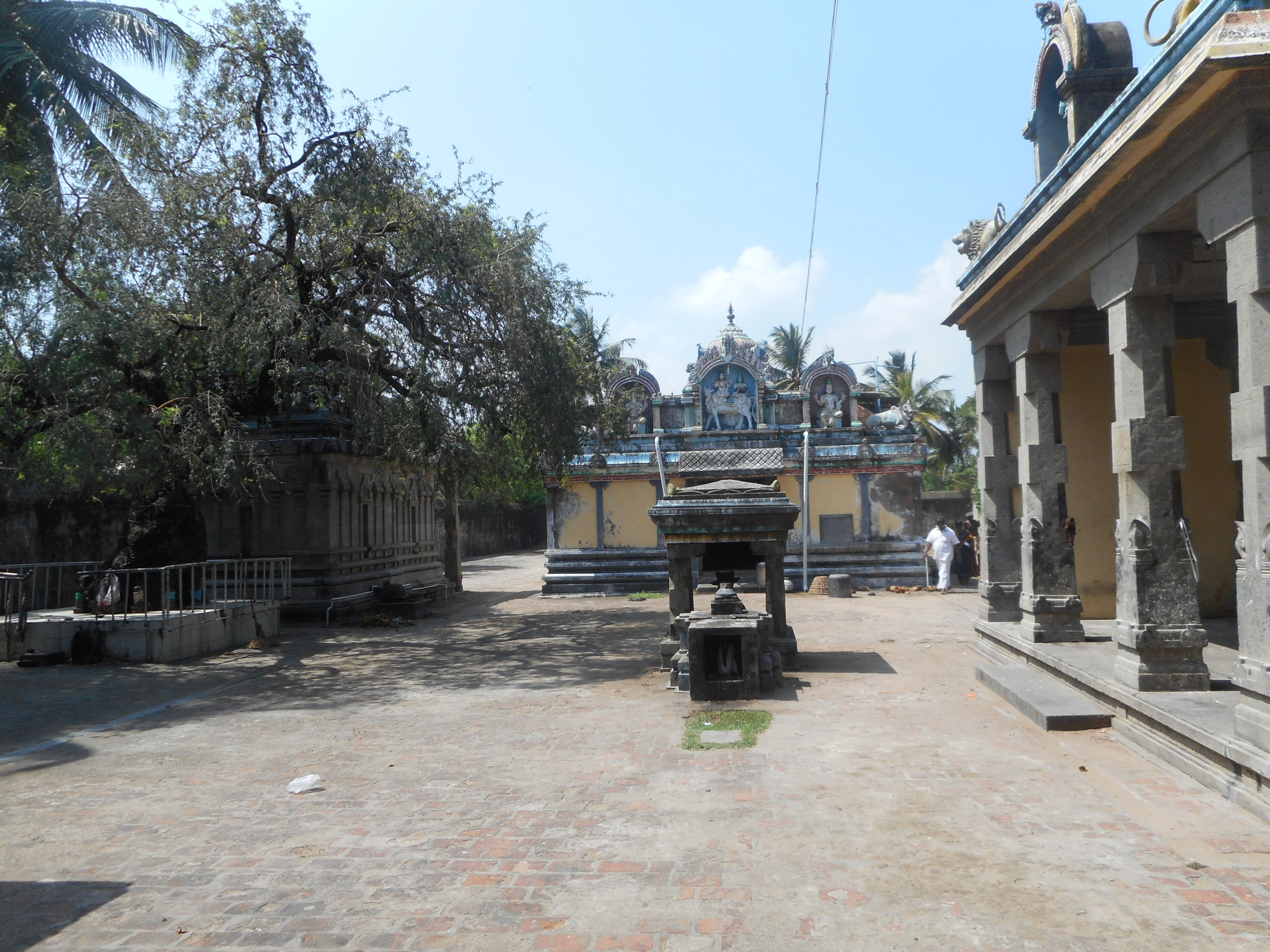
A shrine inside the temple

The Agastheeswarar temple complex has three prakarams and a three-tiered rajagopuram. The central shrine faces east and holds the image of Agastheeswarar (Shiva) in the form of a lingam made of granite and the shrine of Parvathi in the form of Pakampiriyal faces west. There are granite images of the deities Ganesha, Murugan, Nandi and Navagraha located in the hall leading to the sanctum and as in other Shiva temples of Tamil Nadu, the first precinct of the sanctum of Agastheeswarar has images of Dakshinamurthy, Durga and Chandikeswarar. There is also a shrine with the image of Agasthiyar enshrined in it. The second precinct is surrounded by granite walls and the temple tank inside the temple is called Agni Theertham.
