= Rajadhiraja I =

Chola emperor from 1044 to 1052

Rajadhiraja Chola I
- Rajakesarivarman, Maharajadhiraja, Yuddhamalla, Jayankonda Chola, Kalyannapuramkonda Chola, Vijayarajendra Chola, Ahavamalla Kulantaka, Yaanai Mel Thunjiya Thevar
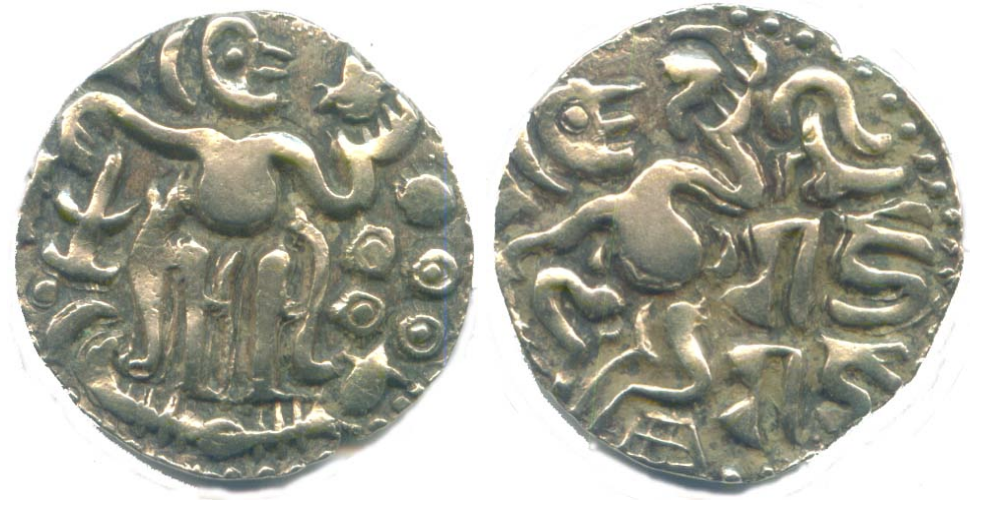
- Coin of Rajadhiraja I

Chola Emperor
- Reign: 1044 – 28 May 1052
- Predecessor: Rajendra I
- Successor: Rajendra II

Co-Regent of the Chola Empire
- Reign: 1018–1044
- Emperor: Rajendra I
- Predecessor: Rajendra I
- Successor: Rajendra II

Chola Viceroy of the Pandyas
- Reign: 1018–1044
- Predecessor: Rajendra I
- Successor: Rajendra II
- Born: Ilaval Sundaran; 994; Thanjavur, Chola Empire (present-day Thanjavur, Tamil Nadu, India)
- Died: 28 May 1052 (aged 57–58); Koppam, Western Chalukya Empire (present-day Karnataka, India)
- Cause of death: Killed in battle by a barrage of arrows while mounted on his elephant.
- Empress: Trailokyamahadevi
- Issue: Madhurandhagan; Kandaradithan
- Dynasty: Chola
- Father: Rajendra I
- Mother: Mukkokilan Adigal
- Religion: Hinduism

Rajadhiraja Chola I (994 – 28 May 1052), was a Chola emperor, as the successor of his father, Rajendra I. He was the only Chola emperor who was killed while leading his army in war, and although he had a short reign, he helped his father conquer several territories as well as to maintain the Chola authority over most of Sri Lanka, Eastern Chalukyas and Kalinga, among others. He also established imperial relations with overseas allies despite a series of revolts in the territory.

Rajadhiraja Chola proved capable of maintaining the vast and expansive empire with territories even outside the shores of India. Records also show that the king was a skilled commander on the battlefield, leading his soldiers from the front lines. He earned the title Jayamkonda Solan (The Victorious Cholan) after numerous victories. Towards the end of his reign, he sacked the Western Chalukyan capital Kalyanapuram and assumed the title Kalyanapuramkonda Chola and performed a Virabhisheka (anointment of heroes) under the name Vijaya Rajendra Cholan (the victorious Rajendra Cholan).

The Copper-plate inscription of Rajadhiraja I and his younger brother Rajendra II, was discovered on 20 May 2010 at Thiruvilandur near Mayiladuthurai.

== Early life and ascension ==
According to the Thiruvilandur Copper Plate inscriptions, Rajadhiraja I's birth name was Jayangondachola. He was the second son of Rajendra I and the elder brother of his successor, Rajendra II. His elder brother Rajaraja died at a young age before reaching the age of thirteen. The Tiruvalangadu Copper Plates of Rajendra I record that Rajadhiraja had been appointed as the Chola-Pandya viceroy in charge of the Pandya country, around 1018. From that time onward, he and his father, Rajendra I, ruled together. Rajadhiraja's inscriptions indicate that he exercised royal authority during his father's lifetime and participated in several of Rajendra I's military campaigns.

According to an interpretation of the Thiruvilandur inscription, Rajendra I may have intended shortly before his death to elevate Rajendra II to the position of Yuvaraja. Rajendra II, however, declined the appointment after Rajendra I's death, on the grounds that Rajadhiraja, as the elder son and established heir, should succeed their father. Rajadhiraja therefore succeeded Rajendra I as emperor, in 1044 AD, while Rajendra II continued to exercise authority over the Pandya territory and supported the authority of his elder brother.

Rajathiraja gave them the titles of 'Vanavan' (for the Chera country); 'Minavan' (for the old Pandya kingdom); 'Vallaban' (for Chalukya territory, after, probably, his defeat of Someshwara I); 'Tennavan' (for Southern Pandya dominions); 'Gangan' (for the Gangavadi province); 'King of Lanka' (for Ceylon); 'Pallavan' (for the former Pallava kingdom); and 'Protector of the people of Kanyakubja' (probably after his defeat of the Singhalese prince, Vira Salamegha, who was said to have come to the island from Kannauj).

== Military campaigns ==
=== Revolts in Lanka ===
Map of the Chola Empire under Rajadhiraja I (c. 1045 C.E.)

The Buddhist text Mahavamsa shows that the years following the defeat and deportation of the Sinhalese king Mahinda V by Rajendra in 1017 CE were filled with revolt and anarchy due uprisings by the Sinhalese subjects against the reign of the Chola invaders. Mahinda was captured and transported to the Chola country as prisoner where he died 12 years later. Mahinda's son Kassapa had formed the resistance against the Chola occupiers and the revolts were centered on Kassapa.

Kassapa managed to face off the almost 95,000 strong Chola army for over six months and push them northwards from the Rohana area in southern Sri Lanka he then crowned himself Vikramabahu in 1029 C.E. Cholas never intended to subjugate the entire island of Sri Lanka and only occupied the whole island for a period of about 10 years. Sinhalese resistance was assisted by various Pandyan princes against their common enemy. Pandyas had a very close political as well as marital relationship with the Sinhalese.

During Rajadhiraja's reign this became very acute as Vikramabahu launched an all out attack on the Tamil armies to expel them from the island. He was assisted by a Pandya prince Vikarama Pandya and Jagatpala, a prince from the distant Kanyakubja in northern India. Rajadhiraja's forces battled and killed these princes.

The version of the Mahavamsa has to be taken in the right perspective in that it states itself to be a Buddhist chronicle and its point of view is only supposed to favour Buddhist subjects. We cannot expect it to speak in very complimentary terms about non-Buddhist kings. In any case, at least in war, the Cholas were known to be very uncompromising with their enemies and believed in eliminating them rather than setting them free. whether it was the "Chalukyas", "Pandyas" or the "Sinhalese kings"... their treatment was the same, which the Mahavamsa chroniclers found inhuman.

The Chola provinces in Lanka were a separate administrative division of the empire. The deep southern half was however a Sinhalese stronghold in perpetual conflict with the Cholas. Prince Kitti, son of Vikramabahu became Vijayabahu in 1058 CE and took over the leadership of the resistance. The generals of Cholas executed the captured Lankan generals along with their family members.

=== Continuing Chalukya Wars ===
Rajadhiraja's first invasion of the Chalukya country resulted he defeated Someshvara I and causing his sons Vikramaditya VI and Vijayaditya to flee in the Battle of Pundur. He pursued the Chalukyas and drove them over the Tungabhadra northwards as far as Kollippakkai (Kulpak) and destroyed that town. These events are given in the inscriptions of the 26th year. Rajadhiraja, eager to subdue the rising power of the Western Chalukyas and to restore Chola influence with the Eastern Chalukyas in Vengi, personally led an expedition into the Telugu country in 1046 CE. He defeated the Western Chalukya forces in the Battle of Dannada on the river Krishna and set fire to their fort. This expedition was followed by number of raids into the Chalukya country by the Chola army after defeating the Chalukyas in the Battle of Kampili which they captured several generals together with numerous women's and feudatories of Chalukyas and demolished the Chalukya palace at Kampili. The victorious Chola forces crossed the Krishna river and erected a victory pillar at a place called Yadgir. After more fighting, Kalyani, the capital of Chalukya, which is identified as Kalyan or Basavakalyan in Bidar was sacked. Cholas also placed a victory pillar in Kolhapur or Kollapuram in Maharashtra. The victorious Rajadhiraja entered the capital of the vanquished Chalukyas and his coronation was performed at 'Kalyanapura', subsequent to which he assumed the title Vijayarajendra. Someshvara I was banished to places like Rodda, Kadambalige and Kogali 1000 territories in the Nolambavadi areas.

Rajadhiraja brought a finely sculpted stone statue of a Dwarapalaka (Note: a traditional guardian deity.) in the Chalukyan style. (Note: The statue was formerly kept near the entrance of the Airavatesvara Siva Temple at Darasuram, but was later moved to the Thanjavur Art Gallery.) It bears a two-line inscription on its /base,

“Hail! This Guard-of-Entrance (Dwarapalaka) has been brought by the
lord Vijayarajéndradeva after burning (Conquering) Kalyinapuram”.

— Thiruvilandur Copper Plate

The Thiruvilandur Copper Plate of Rajadhiraja Chola I and Rajendra Chola II records,

Now the highly furious Rajadhiraja himself personally led the huge divisions of war-chariots, elephants, horses and foot soldiers; their war-cry was reverberated in the mountain caves (v. 58). He entered Kalyanapura, the capital city and abode of the Chalukya, by breaking open by his elephants the huge strong, stone-built rampart of that city; this act broke also heart of the enemy (v. 59). When the capital was thus attacked by the death-god-like merciless Rajadhiraja, his enemy, Jayasimha’s son (Chalukya Somésvara I Ahavamalla) fled from there, just as the life-breath does from the physical body tortured by the death-god; and he became fugitive—no one was able to find where he had gone (v. 60). Now the Chola burnt that city, like Purari (Lord Siva); he made his pillar of victory in the form of the very high fire-flame that arose from the burning rampart of that city; he ransacked and pillaged the enormous wealth of that city; distributed the same among.

— Thiruvilandur Copper Plate

In 1050 CE Chalukya king Someshvara reneged on his payment of tribute to his Chola overlords and usurped the Chalukya throne from the Chola viceroy in Kalyani(modern Basavakalyan). He also sent an expedition to Vengi in order to re-inforce Western Chalukyan hegemony over the Eastern Chalukyas, whom they always regarded as their dominions. It is also speculated that Someshvara I 'may' have captured Kanchi and Kalinga. However, according to Nilakanta Sastri and Majumdar, these are baseless claims because Someshvara I had as his feudatories the Uchangi Pandyas and the Nolamba Pallavas who had provided shelter to his predecessors Jayasimha-II and Satyashraya. The Nolamba Pallavas pompously held the birudas 'Lord of Kanchi', which may lead one to believe that the feudatories of the Chalukyas were ruling from Kanchi or occupying Kanchipuram, both of which presumptions are false. Also, the Cholas were controlling Kalinga through the Vengi Kings like Vimaladitya and Raja Raja Narendra who were related to the Chola Kings. While Someshvara-I did destabilise Vengi by temporarily displacing Rajaraja Narendra, this act also initially disturbed Chola connections with Kalinga. This however, was short-lived for immediately Rajadhiraja-I set off for war against Someshvara-I and that too not at Vengi or Kalinga but by the Chalukya capital itself. But that was after thoroughly preparing himself for war before which he undertook in 1052, the task of anointing his younger brother Rajendra Chola II as co-regent in preference to his own sons. The latter seems to have ascended the throne in 12th for he has the title Rajakesari from then on. When these tasks were completed, in 1054 Rajadhiraja invaded the Chalukyan territory.

Rajadhiraja invaded Rattamandalam (southern Karnataka) and immediately seized many of the southern parts of Chalukyan territory like Uchangi, Nulambavadi, Kadambalige, Kogali etc. These developments shook Someshvara-I, who had given himself the title of Trailokyamalla after installing his puppet in Vengi and he had to rush back to save his own kingdom and he had no option but to march against the marauding Chola armies. The two armies met at a place called Koppam on the banks of the Krishna River.

A battle broke out at Koppam between the Chola forces and the Chalukya army. The inscription describes the fighting between the infantry, cavalry and elephant divisions of both sides. Rajadhiraja fought from atop his elephant, but was killed by a shower of arrows from the Chalukya army. His younger brother Rajendra II, who was commanding another division of the Chola army, then assumed command of the forces. He rallied the Chola army and continued the battle against the Chalukyas, resulting in the withdrawal of Someshvara.

The Thiruvilandur Copper Plate of Rajadhiraja Chola I and Rajendra Chola II records,

Having not got the enemy, the war-thirsty Chola prince withdrew from Kollapura. But his mind was not satisfied as he had not got the enemy. Even though he had burnt down the lands of the Andhra country, he remained unsatisfied since there was a lull in the war activity (v. 68). In the meanwhile, the Andhra (i.e. the Chalukya) king had gathered a huge army. Marching with that army, he cried, calling for war the Chola who was just withdrawing. He called the Chola just like the son of the Sun, i.e. Sugriva, called for fight the mighty Valin (in an episode in the [Ramayana]) (v. 69). Hearing that doubly resounding war-cry of the Chalukya, inviting and provoking for fight, the Chola too collected immediately his powerful army and, returning with equal vigour the enemy’s war-cry, he directly met the mighty army of the enemy (v. 70). Now broke at the place called Koppam, a terrible battle between the two rivals, viz. the Chola and the lord of the Rattarashtra—the one, the Chola, full of fury on seeing the enemy, who though was already vanquished, yet escaped; and the other, the Chalukya, doubly angry on account of his recent defeat at the hands of the Chola (v. 71). Here the poet has assigned seven lengthy verses to describe the details of how the different army columns of both the rival sides fought. In that pitched battle, the columns of foot soldiers, horses and elephants of the Chola army fought terribly with their corresponding columns of the army of the enemy. Propelled by great anger, born of sense of shame, because of his recent defeat at the hands of the Chola, the enemy fought quite ferociously and aggressively. The Chola too, mounting upon his mighty, formidable elephant, fought very violently and like a forest-fire he burnt off columns of enemy’s army (verses 72–78). But alas! This forest-fire seated on the back of the elephant was extinguished by the thick clouds of enemy army with their downpour of arrows, i.e. the Chola king Rajadhiraja mounted upon his elephant was killed by the Chalukya army by the downpour of arrows (v. 79).

— Thiruvilandur Copper Plate

== Inscriptions ==
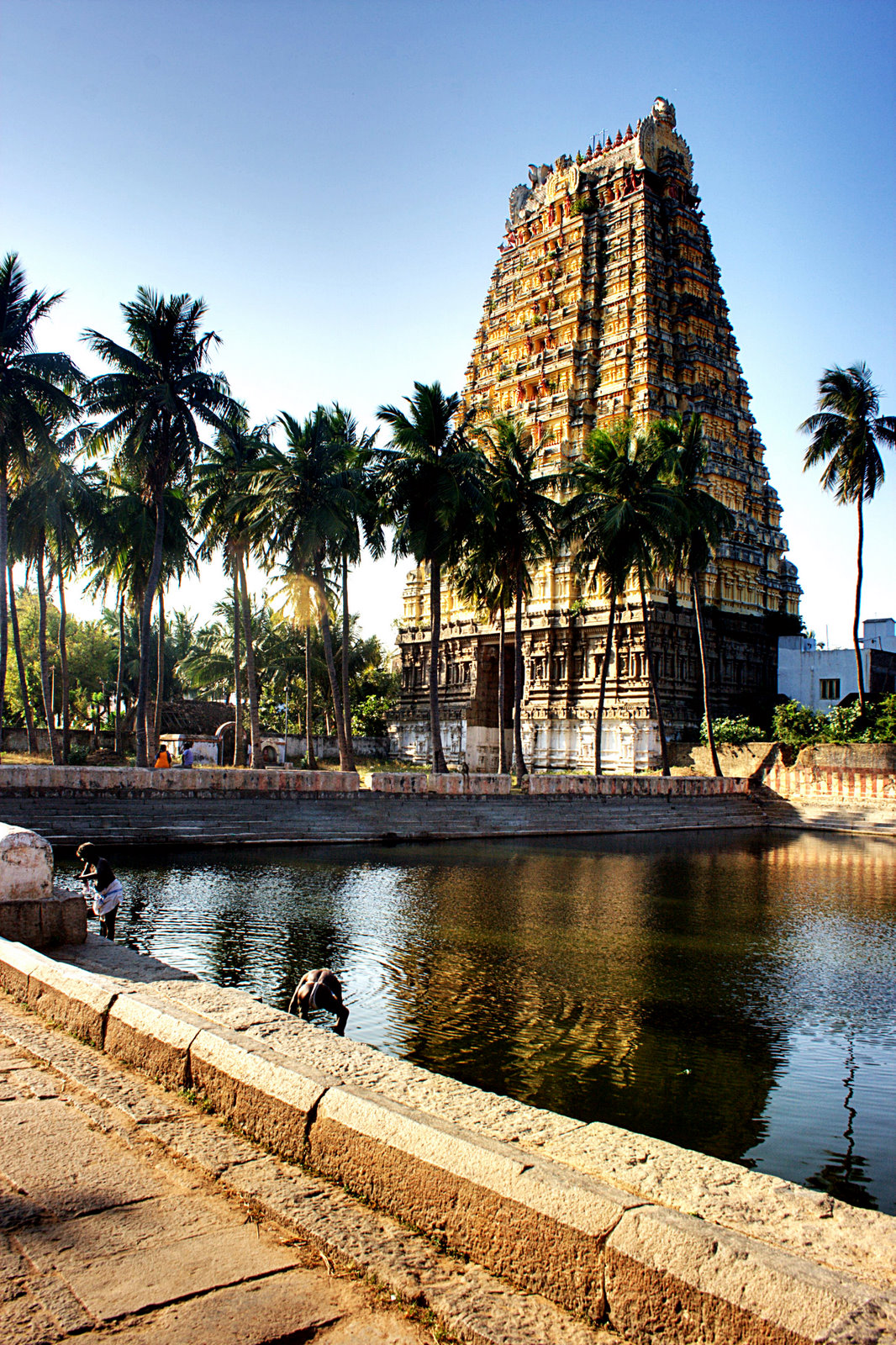
Vedagiriswarar Temple in Chengalpattu

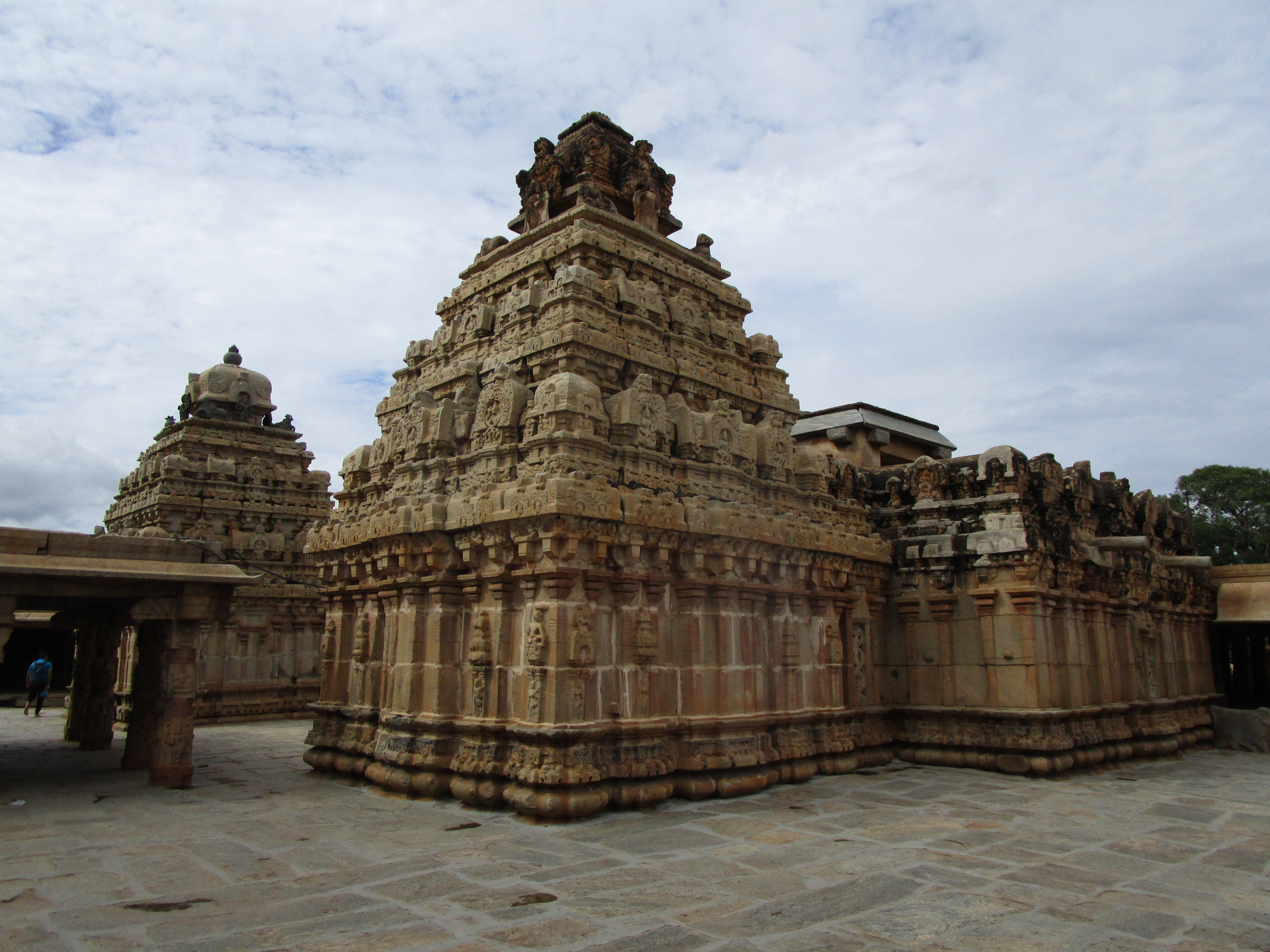
Bhoganandishwara Temple in Chikballapur

=== Thiruvilandur Copper Plate ===
Thiruvilandur Copper Plate, is a royal land-grant charter of the medieval Chola dynasty, issued during the reigns of Rajadhiraja Chola I and his younger brother Rajendra Chola II. The charter mentions the grant (Note: The charter records three interrelated grants made at different times during the reigns of three successive Chola rulers Rajadhiraja I, Rajendra II, and Virarajendra.) records,

The first grant records that Rajadhiraja I, in the 35th year of his reign, issued an order from Pazhayarai establishing the brahmadeya of Cholakulanarayana-chaturvedimangalam. The foundation comprised eleven villages, formed by combining nine villages with Kallarmangalam and Korrangudi, and was granted tax-free to 130 Chaturvedi Brahmins. The charter, made effective from the king's 33rd regnal year, records the landholdings, including cultivable and uncultivable areas, house sites, tanks and tax-free paddy revenue, measured in veli, ma and kani. It also names the revenue officials, surveyors, accountants and members of local assemblies involved in surveying, assessing and registering the grant. The tax exemption was made at the request of the subordinate ruler Vikramachola Pandya (identified as Maravarman Vikrama Chola Pandya, who ruled 1050–1079).

— Thiruvilandur Copper Plate

=== Tiruvenkadu inscriptions ===
Rajadhiraja's inscriptions begin with the introduction tingaler-taru. The following is an inscription from the Swetharanyeswarar Temple in Tiruvenkadu, a few miles from Vaitheeswaran Koil temple in Mayiladuthurai district. It mentions the king's father, i.e., emperor Rajendra I

A record in the 30th year of the reign of Rajakesari Varma alias Udaiyar Rajadhiraja Deva (I) Records that one Ambalan Seyyavayar set up the image of Picchadevar (Bhikshatana), gave lands for its requirements, presented gold and silver ornaments, opened a charity house and provided for its maintenance. The same person is said to have obtained lands for the temple from the king's father (Rajendra I), who was pleased to take Purvadesam, Ganga and Kadaram.

There is another inscription of the king his 29th regnal year from the Manimangalam village about donation of land which speaks on a detailed way his military achievements. Inscription goes on to describe the following:

a. Appointment of his 7 relatives as governors to Chera, Chalukya, Pandya, Ganga, Ceylon, Pallava and Kanyakubja (Kannauj – UP).

b. Victorious war against ahavamalla, vikki, vijayaditya who are Someswarar I, Vikramaditya VI and Vijayaditya respectively of Western Chalukya and the burning of Kollipakai.

c. His exploits at Ceylon where he attacked its four kings (Vikramabahu, Veera Salamegan, Vikrama Pandya and Srivallabha madanaraja) . Out of four, vira salamegan had initially ruled over Kannauj.

d. On his second raid to chalukyan kingdom, he went on to burn Kampili and he died on the battle field at Kopam. There is one inscription by Western Chalukya which was inscribed in Annigere which talks of a wicked chozha who had abandoned his religious practices and burned Jaina temples and ultimately yielded his head to someswara.

=== Chengalpattu inscriptions ===
Another inscription of the king from a temple in Chengalpattu district is as follows,

On the west and south bases shrine in Adhipursivara temple. A record of the Chola king Rajakesari Varma alias Udaiyar Rajadhiraja Deva (I). Records in his thirty first year, a sale of land by the assembly of the brahmadeya villages of Sundarasola-chatuvedimangalam and Vanavanmahadevi-chaturvedimangalm. It was purchased by Nagalavvaichchani alias Ariyammai, wife of Prabhakara Bhatta, a resident of Megalapuram in the Arya-desa and a devotee of the temple of Tiruvorriyurudaiaya Mahadeva. The purchased land was given to the matha called Rajendrasolan which was built by that lady. Records also other sales of land to the same lady and for the same purpose, by residents of Ennoor in Navalur-nadu, which was a sub-division of Pularkottam and by the merchants (nagarattaar) of Tiruvorriyur in the years thirty-one and twenty-seven of the same reign.

=== Rajagopala Perumal Temple inscriptions ===
From an inscription from the 29th year of his reign from the Rajagopala Perumal temple we understand that he defeated several warriors of the Chalukyan army, the most notable being Vikki (Vikramaditya), Vijayadityan and Sangamayan. In addition, it also shows the various kingdoms that acknowledged his supremacy. Here is an excerpt:

...he cut-off on the battle-field the head of Manabharanan,...seized in battle (the Kongu Chera) Vira Kerala whose ankle rings were wide and was pleased to get him trampled down by his furious elephant,...he sent the undaunted king of Venad [back] to the country of Cheras...he captured the salai at Kandalur,...when Ahavamallan became afraid;...when two warriors of great courage Vikki and Vijayadityan...retreated...
the tribute paid without remissions by the Villavar (Chera), Minavar (Pandya), the Chalukkyas, Kausalar, Vanganar, Konganar, Sindurar, Pangalar and Andhirar and other kings and the riches collected...were gladly given away to those versed in the four Vedas (i.e to the Brahmins). In order to be famed in the whole world, he followed the path of Manu and performed the Horse-Sacrifice...In the 29th year (of the reign) of this king Rajakesari Varma, alias the lord Sri Rajadhiraja Deva, who was seated on the royal (throne and who had obtained) very great fame (under the name) Jayangonda Cholan, we, the great assembly of Manimangalam, alias Rajachulamani Chaturvedi-mangalam, in Maganur-nadu, (a subdivision) of Chengattu-kottam, (a district) of Jayangonda Chola Mandalam

=== Inscriptions from Karnataka ===
Here is an excerpt of an inscription from the Chikballapur district of Karnataka. It gives a brief overview of some of the king's exploits while he was still a co-regent of his predecessor (original in Tamil and Grantha alphabet):

In the 32nd year of the reign of Ko Rajakesari Varma alias Sri Rajadhiraja Deva of bright intellect, who...was born to render conspicuous the ancient race of the hot-rayed god (i.e., the Solar Race); who caused his umbrella, planted under the shadow of his father's white umbrella, to cast its shade over the entire kingdom of his father, who conquered with his army Ganga of the prosperous north, Lanka of the south, Makotai of the west and Kadaram of the east; who swayed his scepter over every region; who cut-off on the battle-field the beautiful head which was adorned with large jewels and was never without the golden crown, of Manabharanan, the renowned king of the south (Pandya); who sent the king of Venad to heaven [or back to the Chera country]; who killed the king of Kalingam on the battle-field; who caused to be destroyed the Kandalur Salai on the sea coast; and who acquired great fame under the praiseworthy name of 'Jayangonda Cholan' The officer Vira Vichchadira (Vidyadhara) Muvendavelar...gave for the god Maha Nandiswara Udaya Mahadeva, on the Nandi hill in Kalavara Ndu, a plate of gold weighing by the standard of the city, 2.5 kalanju and 1 manjadi, as an ornament to be worn by the god for as long as the sun and the moon exist.

Here is the inscription from Kolar in Karnataka:

In the 35th year...Ko Parakesari Varma alias Vijaya Rajendra Deva, who having taken the head of Vira Pandya, the [Kandalur] Salai of the Chera, Lanka and Rattapadi [the Chalukya] Seven and Half Lakh (country), and set up a pillar of victory at Kalliyanapuram, took his seat on the throne of heroes and got himself anointed as 'Vijaya Rajendra'...in the Kuvalala Nadu of Vijaya Rajendra Mandalam.

Sometime after he ascended the throne, he placed Rajendra Chola II as a co-regent. Rajendra Chola II would reign alongside Rajadhiraja until the latter's death after which he ascended the throne.

== Death and legacy ==
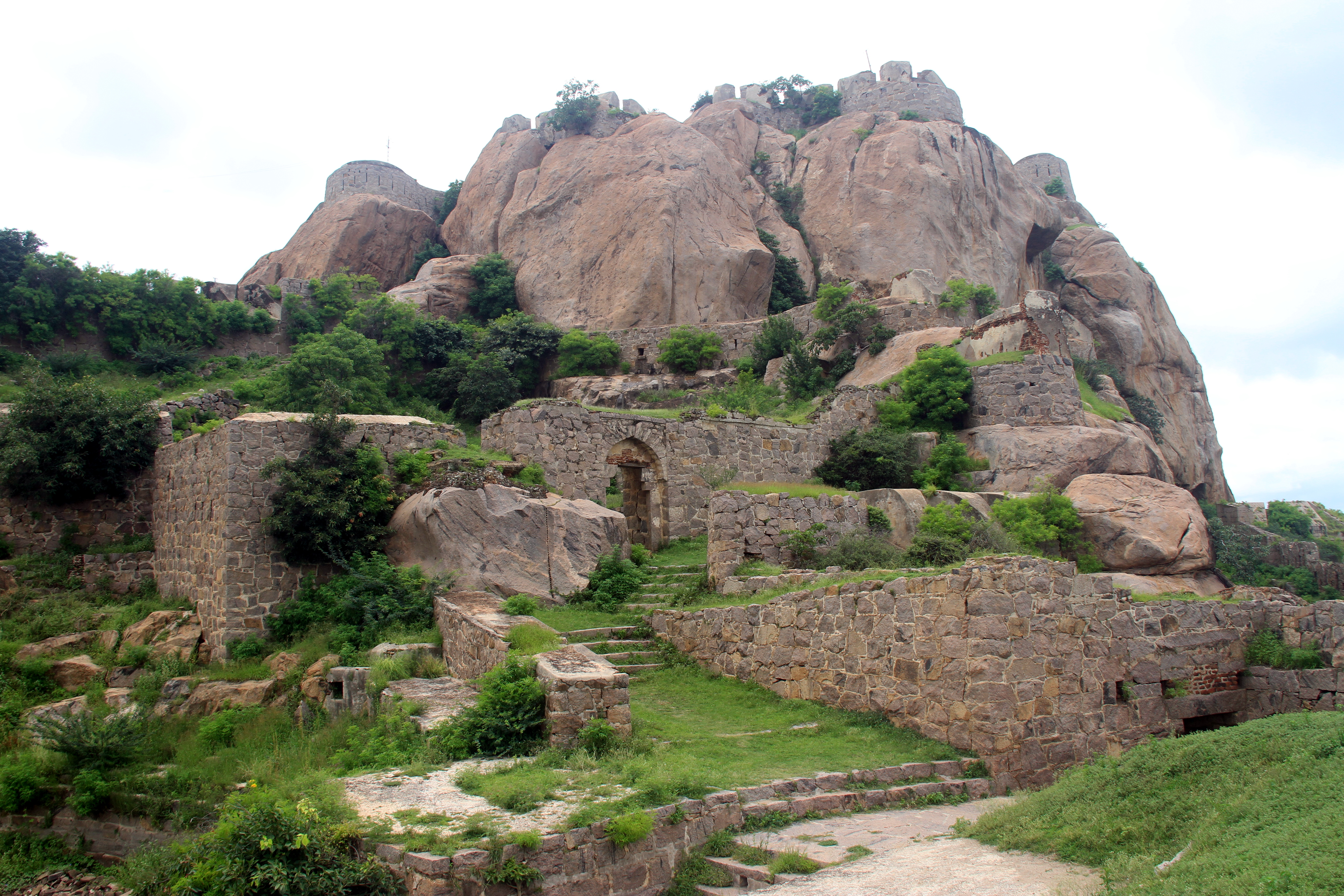
Koppam the site of Rajadhiraja's death.

One of the greatest and bravest warriors in the Chola dynasty and perished alone in a northern battlefield during the Battle of Koppam. Rajadhiraja died atop his elephant, he came to be known as Yanai-mel-thunjina Devar (the king who died sitting on top of the elephant). From the time he was chosen heir-apparent by his father to the day he died on the battlefield, Rajadhiraja led the life of a warrior king and led many campaigns in person. Rajadhiraja was first and foremost a soldier and his great military talent led to him being chosen as heir-apparent and succeeding his father.

== Personal life ==
Rajadhiraja employed his uncle and his brothers in important offices of state and constituted them as subordinate rulers of regions of his empire. We know of the title (Trilokyam Udaiyar) rather than the actual name of a queen. His queens do not figure prominently in his records. Apart from Vijaya Rajendra, he took the titles of Virarajendra Varman, Ahavamally Kulantaka and Kalyanapurangondachola. His children seem to have been overlooked in the succession to the Chola throne for a brief time.

== Officials ==
Vira-Vichchadira (Vidyadhara)-Muvendavelan was a prominent military officer of Rajadhiraja. He has made several generous donations to the various temples in Kalavara Nadu, a sub-division of Nigarili-Chola-Mandalam (part of present-day Karnataka) where he was deployed. Vettan Panachanadi-Vānan alias Madurāntaka-tTamil-pperaiyan of Tandāngurai in Vilānādu belonging to the Pandikulasani valanadu of Sola-mandalam was the overseer of the dandanayakas. Santi Kuttan Tiruvalan Tirumud Kunran alias Vijaya Rajendra Acharyan, an actor was in charge of the troupe that were responsible for enacting the Rajarajeswara Natakam (a musical), in the Brihadeeswarar Temple, Thanjavur. Velala Madurantakam alias Dandanayakan Rajadhiraja Ilangovelan was another officer from Nadar, a village of Tiraimur-nadu which was a sub-division of Uyyakondan-valanadu in Sola-mandalam. He has donated 90 sheep to a temple in Tiruvorriyur during the 3rd year of the reign of Rajendra Chola II when the latter was still a co-regent of the king.

== Religion ==
Like his father, he too was a devout of Shaivisim. The Shaiva Siddhanta school of thought was prevalent and the Bhakti poetry of the Nayanars were encouraged and sang in the temples. A record dated in the twenty-eighth year of the king's reign is available at the Adhipurisvara temple in Tiruvorriyur which mentions the Tiruttondatogai of Sundarar and the names of the sixty three Nayanars.

== Notes ==
Preceded by Rajendra Chola I	Chola; 1018–1052 CE	Succeeded by Rajendra Chola II

== Bibliography ==
- Scharfe, Hartmut (1989). The State in Indian Tradition. Leiden: E. J. Brill. ISBN 90-04-09060-6.
- Mendis, G. C. (1975). The Early History of Ceylon, and Its Relations with India and Other Foreign Countries. New York: AMS Press. ISBN 0-404-54851-2.
- Nilakanta Sastri, K. A. (1935). The Cōḻas (Reprinted 1984 ed.). Madras: University of Madras.
- Nilakanta Sastri, K. A. (1955). A History of South India (Reprinted 2002 ed.). New Delhi: Oxford University Press.
- Davis, Richard H. (1997). Lives of Indian Images. Princeton, New Jersey: Princeton University Press. ISBN 0-691-00520-6.
- Jagadisa Ayyar, P. V. South Indian Shrines: Illustrated.
- Raja Gopal, Balakrishnan. The Chālukyas of Kalyāṇa and the Kalachuris.
- T. S, Sridhar (2011). Thiruvindalur Copper Plate [திருவிந்தளூர்ச்‌ செப்பேடு] (in English and Tamil) (First ed.). Chennai: Tamil Nadu State Department of Archaeology. pp. 24–33.

This article incorporates text from The Historical Inscriptions of Southern India, by Robert Sewell, a publication from 1932, now in the public domain in the United States.
