= Chola government =

One of the ancient governments

The Chola Government during the imperial period in 850 – 1200 CE was marked for its uniqueness and innovativeness. Cholas were the first dynasty who tried to bring the entire South India under a common rule and to a great extent succeeded in their efforts. Although the form and protocols of that government cannot be compared to a contemporary form of government, the history of the Chola empire belongs to a happy age in history and great things were achieved by the government and the people. The Chola system of administration was highly organised and efficient. The king was the central pivot of administration, and all the authority and decisions were handled by the respected Velir ministers appointed by the king. The operations in the field were taken care of by the ambalakkarars (local chieftains or panchayat leaders) who were in connection with the respected ministers.

== Extent of government ==
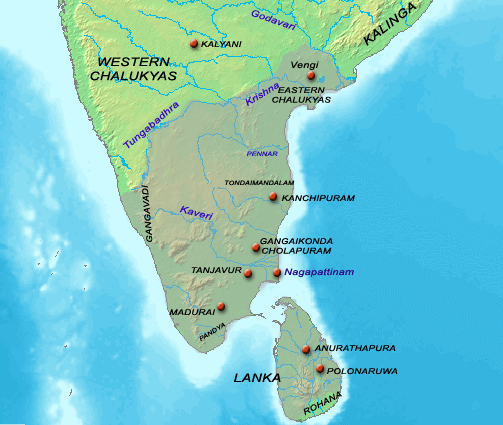
Extent of Chola empire c.1014 CE

Between 980 CE, and c. 1150 CE, the Chola Empire comprised the entire south Indian peninsula extending east to west between sea to sea and bounded in the north by an irregular line along the river Tungabhadra and the Vengi frontier. Although Vengi had a separate political existence, it was so closely connected to the Chola Empire, that for all practical purposes, the Chola dominion extended up to the banks of the Godavari river. The main conquests took place between the accession of Sundara Chola and of Rajendra Chola I. The bulk of the conquests occurred during Rajaraja, and in his reign the Chola kingdom ceased to be a small state, and the character of the Empire took true imperial proportions.

The Chola monarchs used the titles of Chakravartigal ("emperor") and Tribhuvana-Chakravartin ("emperor of the three worlds"). The crown prince began to take part in active administration from the time of Rajaraja and minor princes were appointed as regional governors.

== Capitals ==
Thanjavur and later Gangaikonda Cholapuram, were the imperial capitals. However, both Kanchipuram and Madurai were considered as regional capitals and occasional courts were held in them.

=== Thanjavur ===
The early Cholas had Urayur and Puhar as their capitals. Urayur was still their capital during the interregnum before their revival in the ninth century CE. Vijayalaya Chola defeated the Pandya feudatories Muttarayars and captured the city of Thanjavur, and the city maintained its position as the main city during the reigns of the Chola emperors up to Rajendra Chola I. The presence of the great Brihadisvara Temple also provided the impetus to the grandeur of the monarchy as well as the financial hub of the empire. Inscriptions on the walls of the Brihadisvara temple give us information on the number of royal palaces once present in the city.

=== Gangaikonda Cholapuram ===
Rajendra Chola established the town of Gangaikonda Cholapuram and made it his capital commemorating his successful expedition to the Ganges in 1023 CE. This town, situated southwest of the temple town of Chidambaram does not exist anymore. It was extensively sacked and destroyed by the Pandyas during the dying days of the Chola empire. However, the great Siva temple Gangaikonda Choleshwara still exists proclaiming the once great city. We also find evidence of the splendour of the royal palaces and great markets that once existed there.

== Administrative machinery ==
The king was the supreme commander and a benevolent dictator. His share in the administration consisted of issuing oral commands to responsible officers when representations were made to him. Such orders were recorded in great detail in the inscriptions, usually on the walls of temples. A special type of official, named Tirumandira Olai Nayagam (திருமந்திர ஓலை நாயகம்), who recorded the oral orders immediately on palm leaf manuscripts were responsible of the accurate records of them.

=== Council of Ministers ===
There is no definite evidence of the existence of a council of ministers or other officers connected to the central government, though the names of individual ministers are found in the inscriptions. A powerful bureaucracy assisted the king in the tasks of administration and in executing his orders. Due to the lack of a legislature or a legislative system in the modern sense, the fairness of the king's orders depended on the goodness of the man and his belief in Dharma – a sense of fairness and justice. The ancient society did not expect anything more than general security from the government. Even matters of disputes went to the officers of the court only as the last resort.

=== Bureaucracy ===
The Chola bureaucracy did not differ much from its contemporaries. However, what distinguished it was its highly organized nature. A careful balance between central control and local independence was maintained and non-interference in local government was sacrosanct.

There was a definite hierarchy of the bureaucracy, and the tenure of the officials was simply dependent on the 'Crown's pleasure'. The officials held various titles such as Marayan and Adigarigal. Seniority between the same cadre was indicated by qualifying titles such as Perundanam and Sirutanam.

One of the important such officers was the Revenue officials responsible for the receipts and expenditures of the government.

=== Administrative divisions ===
Every village was a self-governing unit. Several such villages constituted a Korram (கொற்றம்) or nadu (நாடு) or Kottam (கோட்டம்) in different parts of the country. Taniyur (தனியூர்) was a large village big enough to be a Kurram by itself. Several Kurrams constituted a Valanadu (வளநாடு). Several Valanadus made up one Mandalam, a province. At the height of the Chola empire, there were eight or nine of these provinces including Sri Lanka. These divisions and names underwent constant changes throughout the Chola period.

An inscription of the eighth century CE at Uttaramerur temple describes the constitution of the local council, eligibility and disqualifications for the candidates, the method of selection, their duties and delimits their power. It appears that the administration of a common village Ur(ஊர்) or Oor was different from that of a village given to Brahmins.

=== Audits ===
The activities of the officials of the bureaucracy were under constant audit and scrutiny. We have an example of such reports in an inscription from the reign of Uttama Chola which gives us the details of the remissness and neglect of some officials in the delay of recording a particular grant. As a result, a dispute arose between contending parties as to who should benefit from the grant. The officials involved were punished.

As the head of the civil administration, the king himself occasionally toured the country and carried out inquests into the local administration.

=== Revenue administration ===
An extensive resurvey was done around 1089 CE by the Chola king Kulottunga, recording the extent of lands and their assessment, boundaries of villages and the common rights inside the village, including the communal pastures.

Revenue officials were responsible for the tax collection. The Chola government was very mindful of the need for the fair and accurate collection of tax to run the state machinery. The revenue records were not manuals of extortion, but carefully maintained records of land rights, based on complete enquiries and accurate surveys, and were kept up to date by regular surveys.

The duties of revenue officials included many other spheres of responsibility. They also regulated receipts and expenditures of temples. They were also seen to purchase land on behalf of village assemblies. They attested and certified important documents drawn up by local government agencies such as village councils. They were also shown to act as magistrates.

Besides the tax collected by the central government, several local bodies enjoyed the privilege of collecting tolls and other imposts. A part of the revenue was kept for the king. The rest was used on public works such as the building of roads, tanks, the army, and the building of temples.

== Justice ==
Justice was mostly a local matter in the Chola Empire, where minor disputes were settled at the village level. The punishments for minor crimes were in the form of fines or a direction for the offender to donate to some charitable endowment. Even crimes such as manslaughter or murder were punished by fines. Crimes of the state such as treason were heard and decided by the king himself and the typical punishment in such cases was either execution or confiscation of property. The people had to agree with the king in these situations, no matter what.

Village assemblies exercised large powers in deciding local disputes. Small committees called Nyayattar heard matters that did not come under the jurisdiction of the voluntary village committees. The punishments in most cases were in the form of donations to the temples or other endowments. The convicted person would remit their fines at a place called Darmaasana. There is not much information available on the judicial procedures or court records.

There was no distinction between civil and criminal offences. Sometimes civil disputes were allowed to drag on until time offered the solution. Crimes such as theft, adultery and forgery were considered serious offences. In most cases, the punishment was in the order of the offender having to maintain a perpetual lamp at a temple. Even murder was punished with a fine. In one instance a man had stabbed an army commander. Rajendra Chola II ordered the culprit to endow 96 sheep for a lamp at a neighbouring temple.

Capital punishment was uncommon even in the cases of first-degree murder. Only one solitary instance of capital punishment is found in all the records available so far.

== Foreign trade ==
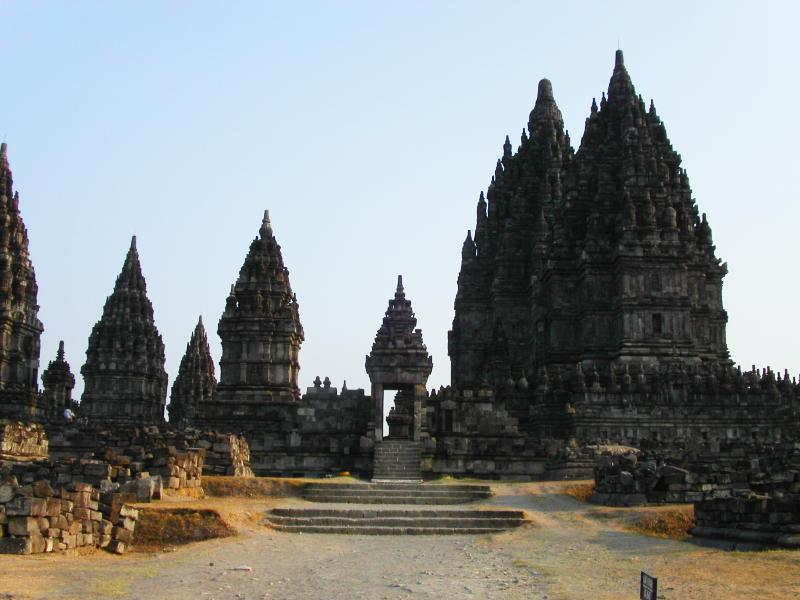
Hindu temple complex at Prambanan in Java clearly showing Dravidian architectural influences.

Towards the end of the ninth century CE, the countries of southern India had developed extensive maritime and commercial activity. The Cholas, having both the west and the east coasts of peninsular India were at the forefront of these ventures. The Tang dynasty of China, the Srivijaya empire in the Malayan archipelago under the Sailendras and the Abbasid Caliphate at Baghdad were the main trading partners.

During the trouble developed during the decline of the Tang dynasty, China became dangerous for foreign traders and the Srivijaya empire benefited from the shifting trade from China and acted as the clearing house for Tamil trade. The Song dynasty that followed the Tang dynasty made the situation more normal, and the trade began to flourish once more. Several trade delegations were sent to many countries including the Chola offering profitable licenses. Cholas were eager to exploit this opportunity and sent several trade missions to China.

Chinese Song dynasty reports record that an embassy from Chulian (Chola) reached the Chinese court in the year 1077 CE and the king of the Chulien at that time was called Ti-hua-kia-lo. It is possible that these syllables denote "Deva Kulo[tunga]" (Kulothunga Chola I). This embassy was a trading venture and ended up very profitable to the visitors. They returned with 81,800 strings of copper coins in return for some articles of tributes including glass articles, and spices.

A fragmentary Tamil inscription found in Sumatra mentions the name of a merchant guild Nanadesa Tisaiyayirattu Ainnutruvar (நானாதேச திசையாயிரத்து ஐந்நூற்றுவர்) (Lit. The Five Hundred from the 16 countries (4x4) and the thousand directions) who were a merchant guild famous in the Chola country. The inscriptions are dated 1088 CE, clearly proving that there was an active overseas trade during the Chola period.
