= Manimangalam =

Coordinates: 12.916°N 80.042°E

- Town
- Interactive map of Manimangalam
- Country: India
- State: Tamil Nadu
- District: Kanchipuram

Languagages
  - Official: Tamil
- Time zone: UTC+5:30 (Indian Standard Time)
- PIN: 601301

Manimangalam is a small town located in the Kanchipuram district of Tamil Nadu state in Southern India, famous for its ancient temples and inscriptions documenting the history of the ancient Tamil kings

== Demographics ==
According to the 2011 Census of India, the town had a population was 8198, of which 4,117 were males and 4,081 were females. The literacy rate is 72.60%. The town is located at a distance of 10 kilometres (6.2 mi) from Tambaram.

== History ==
Manimangalam is a town of historic significance. This place became famous in the Pallava period as the site of the Battle of Manimangala, in which the Pallava king, Narasimhavarman I is said to have defeated the Chalukya King Pulakeshin II, and as one of the places mentioned in the Tamil copper-plate inscriptions of Kūram (in the modern-day Kanchipuram district). It is said that the town housed exporters and merchants of precious jewels. As gathered from inscriptions in Sanskrit in local sites, the town was also known by Ratnagrahara and Ratna Grama (The village of jewels)

The town houses the 1000-year old Rajagopala Perumal Temple, devoted to Vishnu, and which is believed to have been built during the period of the Medieval Cholas, and the Dharmeswara Temple, devoted to Shiva, which is believed to have been built by Kulottunga I during the Later Chola period. In inscriptions found in both these temples, it is gathered that the town had several other appellations - it went by the name of Loka-Mahadevi-Chaturvedi-Mangalam during the time of Rajaraja I (alias Rajakesarivarman), by Raja-Sulamani-Chaturvedi-Mangalam during the reign of the following kings Rajadhiraja, Rajendra and Veera Rajendra and also by a few other names . From the time of Kulothunga Chola I to the end of the third Kulothunga period, the town was called 'Pandiyanai Irumadi Venkonda Chola Chaturvedi Mangalam' ('the town belonging to the Chaturvedi Chola who conquered Pandyas twice'). During the 18- year reign of Raja Raja III, the town was called "Grama Sikamani Chaturvedi Mangalam" (Jewel among habitations).

== Temples ==
The Rajagopala Perumal temple is dedicated to the worship of Vishnu, in the form of Dwaraka-Pati ('the Lord of Dvārakā'), and was also known in Tamil as Vanduvarapati. Besides this, there are two other temples in the town devoted to Vishnu called the Vaikuntha-Perumal temple and the Krishna-swami temple. There is another temple called Kailasa-Nathar temple devoted to Siva.
