= Rajendra II =

Chola emperor from 1052 to 1063

Rajendra Chola II
- Rajendradeva, Parakesarivarman
- Chola Empire under Rajendra Chola II

Chola Emperor
- Reign: 28 May 1052 – 1063
- Predecessor: Rajadhiraja I
- Successor: Virarajendra

Co-Regent of the Chola Empire
- Reign: 1044–1052
- Emperor: Rajadhiraja I
- Predecessor: Rajadhiraja I
- Successor: Rajamahendra
- Born: Vikraman; 997; Thanjavur, Chola Empire (modern day Tamil Nadu, India)
- Died: 1064 (aged 66–67); Gangaikonda Cholapuram, Chola Empire, Tamil Nadu, India)
- Empresses: Rajarajan Arumoliyar alias Tennavan Mādevi, empress of Rajendradeva, Uruttiran Arumoli alias Pirudi Mādeviyar, Kō Kilānadigal
- Issue: Madhurandhagi; Utthama Chola
- Dynasty: Chola
- Father: Rajendra Chola I
- Mother: Mukkokilan Adigal
- Religion: Hinduism

Rajendra Chola II (997–1063), often referred to as Rajendradeva Chola, was the Chola emperor from 28 May 1052 to 1063. Rajendra II succeeded his brother Rajadhiraja I after his death at the Battle of Koppam. Rajendra had served as a Co-regent under his brother from 1044 to 1052. When he acceded the throne, the Chola Empire was at its peak stretching from Southern India to Vengai (Bengal) to parts of Southeast Asia. Rajendra had maintained the territories of his predecessor. During his reign, the Chola Empire was prosperous and had a large influence in trade throughout the Indian Ocean.

As a prince, Rajendra helped put down revolts in Pandya Nadu and Srivijaya. During his early reign, he put down several rebellions in Sri Lanka. Rajendra also straightened Chola influence and control in Ruhuna in southern Sri Lanka. He established several garrisons and governors to maintain stronger rule and prevent future revolts.

In May 1052, the Cholas were suffering from losses against the Western Chalukyas in the Battle of Koppam after the death of Rajadhiraja I. Rajendra's strong leadership led the Cholas to a strategic triumph of the Cholas over the Western Chalukyas in the otherwise tragic battle. Conflicts with the Western Chalukyas continued throughout his reign. Rajendra's forces were victorious in the Battle of Kudal-Sangamam leading to greater Chola influence in the Krishna river.

The Copper-plate inscription of Rajadhiraja I and his younger brother Rajendra II, was discovered on 20 May 2010 at Thiruvilandur near Mayiladuthurai.

== Early life and accession ==
Rajendra II was born around 997 CE to Rajendra I and his wife Mukkokilan Adigal. He was the fifth oldest out of nine children. As a prince, Rajendra helped put down several rebellions Pandya Nadu and Srivijaya. He also helped his father conquer the kingdoms of Polonnaruwa and Ruhuna bringing all of Sri Lanka under Chola rule. After his father's death in 1044, Rajendra served as a Co-regent under his brother Rajadhiraja I who ascended the throne. Rajadhiraja was later killed in the Battle of Koppam in 1052. Rajendra was made king as Rajadhiraja's children were too young and inexperienced. Since he ascended the throne during a time of war, Jayamkondar's Kalingattuparani describes him as "The one who wore the crown on the big battlefield."

According to the Thiruvilandur Copper Plate, Rajendra II was the third son of Rajendra I. His elder brothers were Rajaraja and Rajadhiraja I, while his younger brother was Virarajendra Chola. Rajaraja died at a young age, and Rajadhiraja succeeded their father. The inscription states that Rajendra I intended to appoint Rajendra II as Yuvaraja shortly before his death, but Rajendra II declined, considering Rajadhiraja, the elder son and established heir, to be the rightful successor. Rajendra II succeeded Rajadhiraja I following his death at the Battle of Koppam.

Several Prashasti above version of the Koppam battle is found only in the Chola inscriptions. A Chalukyan account of the battle is only found in a later inscription dated c. 1071, which recounts this incident after a gap of almost 15 years and which only mentions the death of Rajadhiraja.

== Reign ==
=== Revolts in Sri Lanka ===
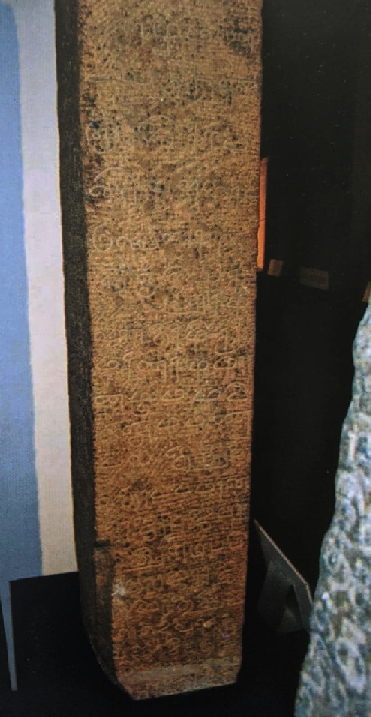
a Pillar containing Inscriptions of Rajendra II at the Colombo National Museum.

Under the reign or Rajendra's father Rajendra I, The kingdom of Ruhuna were annexed bringin all of Sri Lanka under Chola occupation. During this time, the Tamil trading guilds Thisaiayiratthu Annuruvar tarded in Anuradhapura further increased their activities in the Island. Under Rajendra II, several garrisons and governors were established to maintain stronger rule. Rajendra also pushed for tighter control over Ruhuna where several revolts took place.

However this period was also met with revolts by the local Sinhalese People. Rajendra put down several early rebellions and further straightened Chola rule in the island. In 1055 Sinhalese prince Vijayabahu I, who later became the king of Polonnaruwa attempted to expel Chola forces. Gradually the wider conflict developed into a prolonged, back and forth struggle of raids and counter-raids, with the forces of Vijayabahu advancing upon Polonnaruwa and then falling back to fortresses in Dakkhinadesa and Rohana to withstand retaliatory Chola attacks and sieges. By 1058, Rohana became independent of chola occupation. Vijayabahu established himself in Wakirigala and organized his army for a fresh attempt to capture Polonnaruwa, however this failed and his troops were defeater by Rajendra's son Uttama. During this time, he also had to face rebellions from other Sinhala leaders fighting for the throne.

Rajendra eventually sent forces to Sri Lanka to counter the revolt. Rajendra's son Uttama, the Chola governor of Polonnaruwa expelled Vijayabahu's forces. Chola troops also arrived at Ruhuna which was the center of Vijayabahu's rebels. Several clashes continued between the Sinhalese and Chola forces. Rajendra and Uttama eventually put down the revolt.

=== Battle of Koppam ===
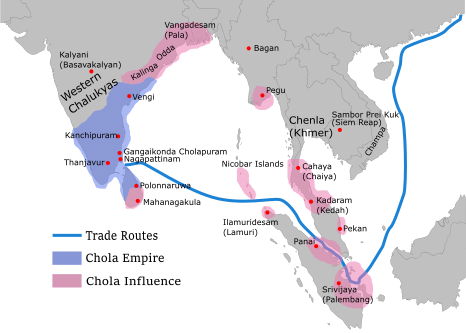
Chola territories under Rajendra II.c. 1059 CE''

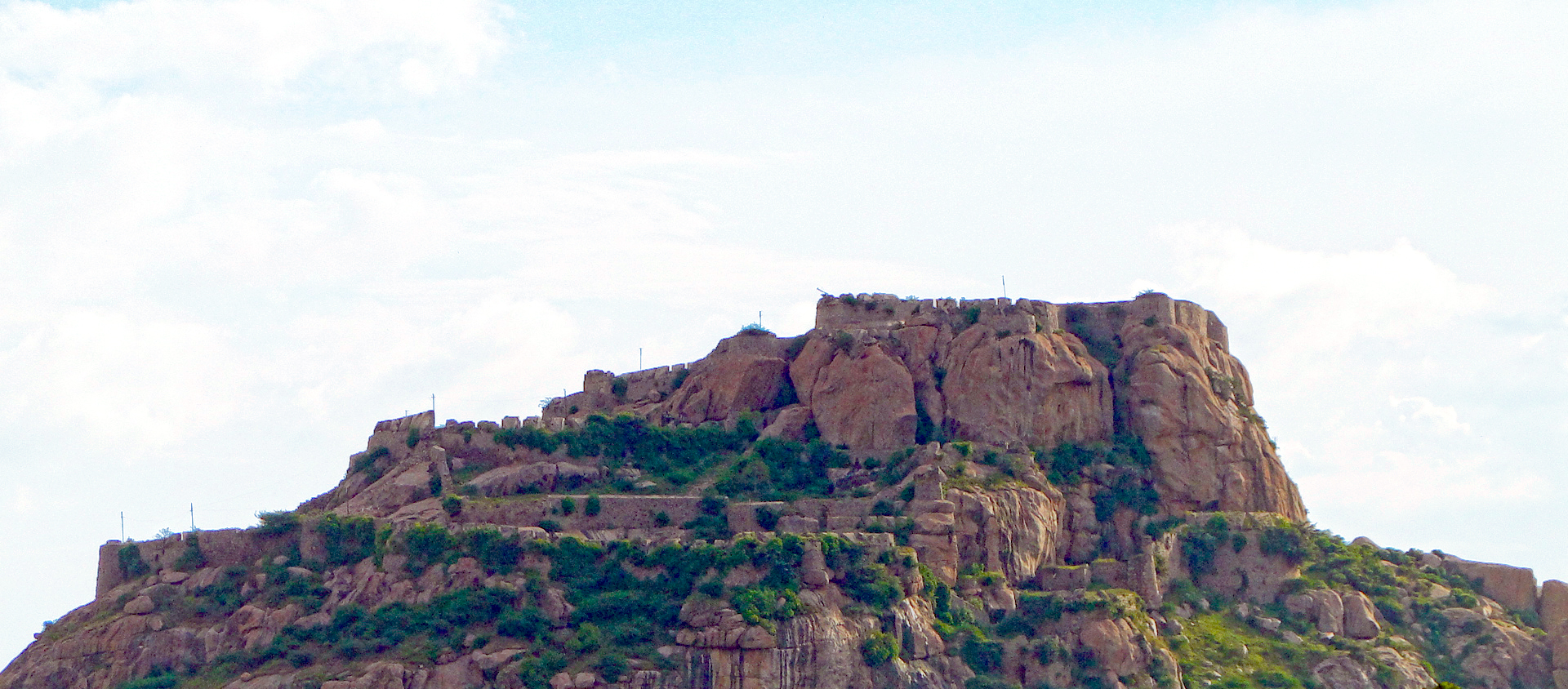
The Fort of Koppal the site of the Battle of Koppam

The Chola forces were in battle with the Chalukyan army at Koppam (Koppal) located on the Tungabhadra River in 1053–54 AD. Rajadhiraja I was personally leading the Chola army from atop a war elephant to help rally the retreating Cholas. Prince Rajendra, the younger brother of Rajadhiraja, was holding himself in reserve. The Chalukyan army then concentrated on the elephant on which the Chola king was riding and wounded him mortally. Seeing the emperor falling dead, the Chola army retreated in disarray. At that stage Rajendra entered the fray. Once again the Chalukya army concentrated on the leader. Rajendra-II was as valorous as his brave father and was a born leader of men. He immediately sensed that with the death of their King Rajadhiraja-I, the Chola army was in a disarray, he announced his taking over as the next Chola monarch and ordered the capable Chola army to continue fighting without letting up. His unparalleled response and restoration of order by deciding to lead from the front on the battlefield simply re-galvanized his army which had among its ranks, several generals serving the Chola army from the times of Raja Raja I and Rajendra Chola I. He had many nephews and . Needless to add, the Chalukya army was simply unprepared for this kind of a reaction from any army which had lost its original leader and were simply no match. From inscriptions of Rajendra-II, we know that his elder brother Rajadhiraja-I was killed in the battle at Koppam in which Rajendra-II had participated along with his other brothers. Even Rajendra-II had been injured initially and had withdrawn from the battle, but he came back and turned the tables on the Ahavamalla (Someshvara-I) who called himself 'Trailokyamalla' – lord of three worlds). From an inscriptions of his from Manimangalam we understand that at the end of the battle, the Chalukyas were defeated and a number of officers of their army lay dead on the field. In this battle multiple opponents viz. Jaysinghan, the younger brother of the Salukki, Pulikesi, Dasapanman etc., were killed by Rajendra.

The Thiruvilandur Copper Plate of Rajadhiraja Chola I and Rajendra Chola II records,

Dabhrasabhadhipa (Rajendra II, who seems to have been on another side of the Chola army) heard about the demise of Rajadhiraja. He immediately led fast his elephant; and, killing many army men of the enemy on the way, he arrived at the spot where his elder brother, the king (Rajadhiraja), mounted on his elephant, had entered the heaven fighting (V.80). He saw the king reclining on the back of elephant, having all over his body arrows struck on him by the enemies; consequently, his entire body was besmeared with blood. Now, reclining on his robust royal elephant, he looked like the sun setting on the top of the western mountain (astandr indra). On his face and limbs, there was no symptom of fear or pain. Seeing the king in that condition, the prince concluded that the King was capable of killing even larger number of foes; hence, he was killed not by the enemy warriors, but only by the Fate, the unconquerable one. Thinking on these lines, the prince could not control himself (nanzshyata), obviously because of his deep grief (V.81). The Chola prince (Rajendra II) fought heroically, desiring to achieve victory (V.84). Every part of his body was filled with anger (V.85). At that juncture, his sole helper in his fight was his powerful bow. He caused it to raise high sound as if provoking the enemy to fight (V.86). The furious Chola sent his powerful arrow, struck down the white umbrella, the Chalukyan royal insignia, of Ahavamalla. The moment the umbrella fell on the ground, the mighty elephant of the Chola smashed it with its leg. This made the Chalukya very much unhappy (Vv. 114–116). Now, the Chalukya, so severely struck, withdrew, and in great fear he started running away from the war front. Now, honouring the age-old venerated code of conduct and ethics of war, the Chola prince, a paragon of virtues, Dabhrasabhadhipa, was not inclined to chase and catch hold of the Chalukya, since he was running away in fear from the war front for saving his life (V.125).

— Thiruvilandur Copper Plate

An inscription from 1058 CE on the south wall of the Brihadisvara Temple in Thanjavur mentions the Battle of Koppam:

Hail! Prosperity ! "While the army of his elder brother was at {his) back, the king(who wielded) the sceptre {and) was embraced by {the goddess of) Prosperity, conquered the seven and a half lakshas of Irattapadi. (He) did not meet with opposition in battle; and(his) drum was sounding through the eight directions. Having heard (this) report, (Ahavamalla) proceeded to Koppam on the bank of the great river and fought against (him). (But he) converted into reeking corpses (that) covered the earth the whole warlike army of Ahavamalla. Having perceived this, Ahavamalla became afraid, incurred disgrace and ran away. (The king) (i.e.,Rajendra II) seized his elephants and horses, troops of camels, women and treasures, and anointed himself (in commemoration) of the victory.

Ottakoothar's Vikrama Cholan Ula mentions:

The King [Rajendra II] with his one elephant in a fierce war, conquered his enemies in the city of Koppam and took over their thousand elephants

— Ottakoothar, Vikrama Cholan Ula, verse 20

Kollapuram is identified with Kolhapur in present-day Maharashtra. Based upon other inscriptions of Rajendra, historian Hultzsch has proposed that the Kollapuram war was an earlier expedition, in which Rajendra had participated under his elder brother Rajdhiraja. This view is also held by a few other historians who credit the burning of Kalyanapuram, the capital of the Chalukyas and the planting of victory at Kollapuram, again two separate events, to Rajadhiraja Chola I.

=== Later Chalukyan conflicts ===
Chalukyas, anxious to wipe out the disgrace of Koppam, invaded the Chola country in great force c 1062 C.E. The armies met at the Muddakaru river (at the junction of the Tungabhadra and the Krishna River). The Chalukya commander Dandanayaka Valadeva was killed and the Cholas led by Rajamahendra resisted the invasion. Virarajendra Chola was also present in the battle fighting at the side of Rajamahendra.

The Western Chalukyan expedition to take Vengi was also thwarted by the Cholas at the same battlefield. Subsequently, Someshwara-I also engaged the Chola army under Rajendra-II and Virarajendra at Kudalasangamam, the result was yet another heavy defeat for the Chalukyan king.

== Legacy ==
=== Grants ===
After his coronation, Rajendra II issued a land grant in his fourth regnal year from the Chola-Kérala palace at Gangaikonda Cholapuram. The grant expanded the earlier Cholakulanarayana agrahara established by Rajadhiraja I and combined the two into a single agrahara, which was named Rajendra Agrahara after the king. The grant comprised 34 villages, which, together with the 10 villages granted earlier, brought the total to 44 villages within Rajadhirajavalanadu. (Note: Rajadhirajavalanadu was an administrative division of the Chola Empire, within which Thiruvilandur was a nāḍu headquarters and a residential neighbourhood and suburb of the present-day town of Mayiladuthurai.) The combined land was made tax-free and granted to 656 Brahmanas. The inscription describes the agrahara as a centre of Vedic learning, religious rituals and residential settlement, and praises its gardens, agricultural prosperity and educational activities. The concluding verse records the king's appeal to future rulers to preserve the brahmadeya grant of Rajendra Agrahara.

=== Patronage of art ===
When he was a co-regent of his elder brother, Rajadhiraja Chola I, he shared the latter's workload by taking care of the internal affairs of the state. He was a great patron of dance and theatre, and encouraged various artists and poets on several occasions. For example, he passed a royal order in 1056 to provide paddies and other rations to Santi Kuttan Tiruvalan Tirumud Kunran alias Vijaya Rajendra Acharyan(named after Rajadhiraja) for enacting RajaRajeswara Natakam (a musical), in the Brihadeeswarar Temple, Thanjavur. Accordingly, the dancer was to get 120 Kalam paddy for this purpose and that he and his descendants were to perform the musical regularly during the annual festival.

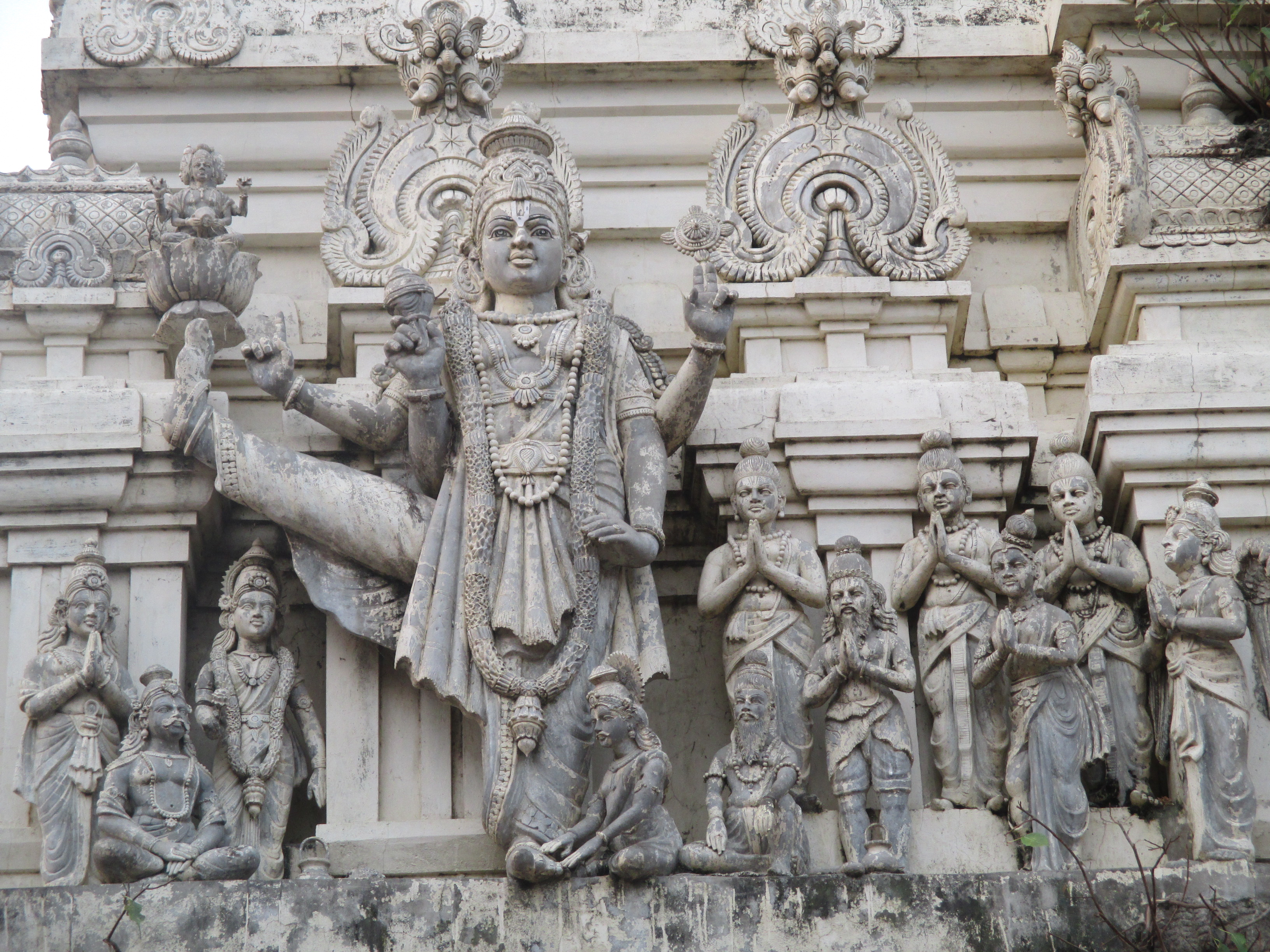
Sculptures of Vishnu on the gopuram of the Ulagalantha Perumal Temple

=== Ulagalantha Perumal Temple ===
Ulagalantha Perumal Temple in Tirukoilur was expanded during rajendra's reign. According to an inscription dating to 1058 CE, the central shrine(gopuram) of the temple, which was built partly of brick, had cracked. The local governor Ranakesari Rama insisted that the shrine should be reconstructed which rajendra had agreed. The new shrine was constructed from fine black granite, a stronger and more durable material. This was so the shrine would last longer without constant repair and reconstruction. five stupas were also built enclosing the verandah and a mandapa in front of the temple. The central deity was also decorated with pearls. This straightened the foundation of the temple allowing it to last to this day.

=== Agastheeswar temple ===
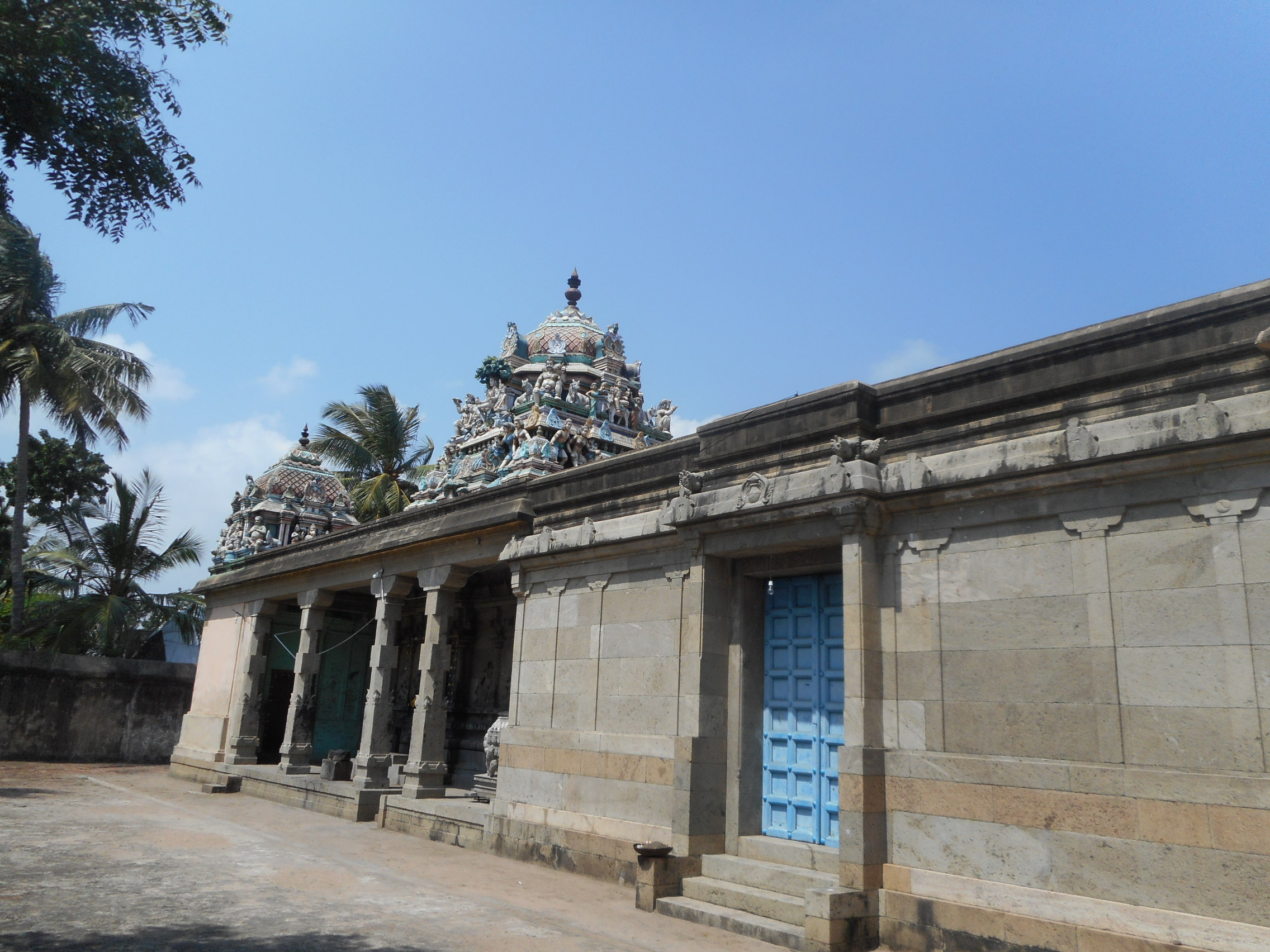
The main shrine of the Agastheeswar temple was likely completed during the time of Rajendra.

Rajendra had granted the town of Ulakkaiyur 100 kalanjus of gold to build a stone temple. This temple, known as the Agastheeswar Temple, was dedicated to Shiva. an inscription from 1137 states that the temple was built by the residents of Ulakkaiyur. Initially the temple construction was stopped in the middle. the amount of gold rajendra granted was not entirely used on the construction of the temple. The servants of the temple also complained about mistreatment by the villagers. Rajendra was unhappy about this. He alter convinced the residents of to complete the foundational work of the temple and install an Idol of Somaskandar, a form of shiva.

=== Other temples and inscriptions ===
Rajendra expanded the Veetrirundha Perumal Temple in 1059. He briefly renamed it Vinnamangalam after his birth name Vikrama. He also issued 120 kalams of paddy Brihadisvara Temple in Thanjavur for an reenactment play known as "Rajarajesvara nata-kam" about the conquests of Rajaraja I.

== Family ==
A number of his relatives are known to us from a record of his from the fourth year of his reign. These are a paternal uncle, four younger brothers, six sons and two grandsons. One of these younger brothers was Virarajendra Chola on whom he conferred the title Karikala solan. Other titles conferred on the members of the royal family by the king include Chola-Pandyan, Chola-Gangan, Chola-Ayodhyarajan and Chola-Kanyakubjan. According to historian Nilakanta Sastri, these titles denoted the provinces that were administered by these Chola princes.

== Conquests ==
Rajendra, like his predecessors, already had control of the Pandyan kingdom. After vanquishing the Chalukya Someshvara I, he undertook a further expedition to Kalinga as well as to Ilangai (Sri Lanka) whose king Manabharanan was aided by the Kalinga King Vira Salamegha. He also had under his control other provinces such as Ayodhya, Kanyakubja, Rattapadi, Kadaram.

An inscription in the 10th year of the reign of Rajendra Chola II is found on a menhir in Meppara near Rajkumari, Idukki District, Kerala. The inscription is highly damaged. The name of the king is said to be Rajendra and the prasasti of the king mentions Irattappadi Ezharai and the battle with Ahavamalla on the banks of "Periyar" i.e. the river Thungabhadra (Mepara Inscription).

== Notes ==
Preceded by Rajendra Chola I	Chola; 1051–1063 CE	Succeeded by Virarajendra Chola
