= Rajagopala Perumal Temple =

Building in India

Coordinates: 12.916°N 80.037°E

Rajagopala Perumal Temple is a Hindu temple located at Manimangalam, near Tambaram, a suburb of Chennai, India. The temple is dedicated to Vishnu.

== History ==
The earliest references to Manimangalam are in relation to a battle fought between the Western Chalukya ruler Pulakesin II and the Pallava king Narasimhavarman I. The Rajagopala Perumal is one of three Vishnu temples in the town and was constructed by the Medieval Cholas. The earliest inscriptions mentioning the temple are by Rajendra Chola I and have been dated to 1056 CE. Rajendra Chola I refers to the temple as Kamakoti-Vinnagar and Thiruvaykulam.
