= Someshvara I =

Western Chalukya Emperor from 1042 to 1068

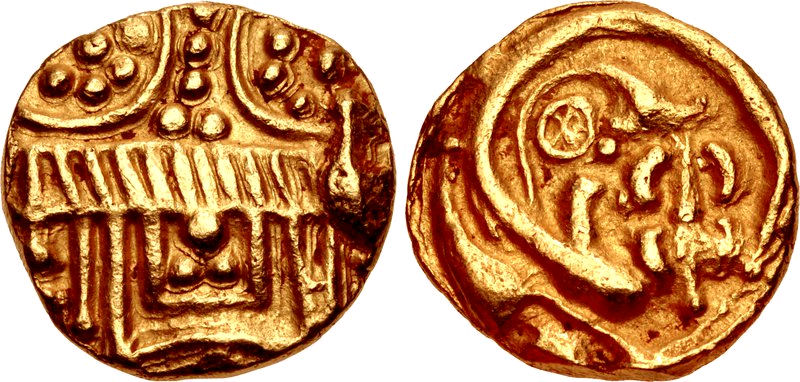
- Western Chalukyas of Kalyana, coin of King Somesvara I Trailokyamalla (1043-1068). Temple façade / Ornate floral ornament.

King of the Western Chalukyas
- Reign: 1042 – 29 March 1068
- Predecessor: Jayasimha II
- Successor: Someshvara II
- Died: 29 March 1068; Kuruvatti, Western Chalukya Empire
- Spouse: Ketaladevi
- House: Chalukya

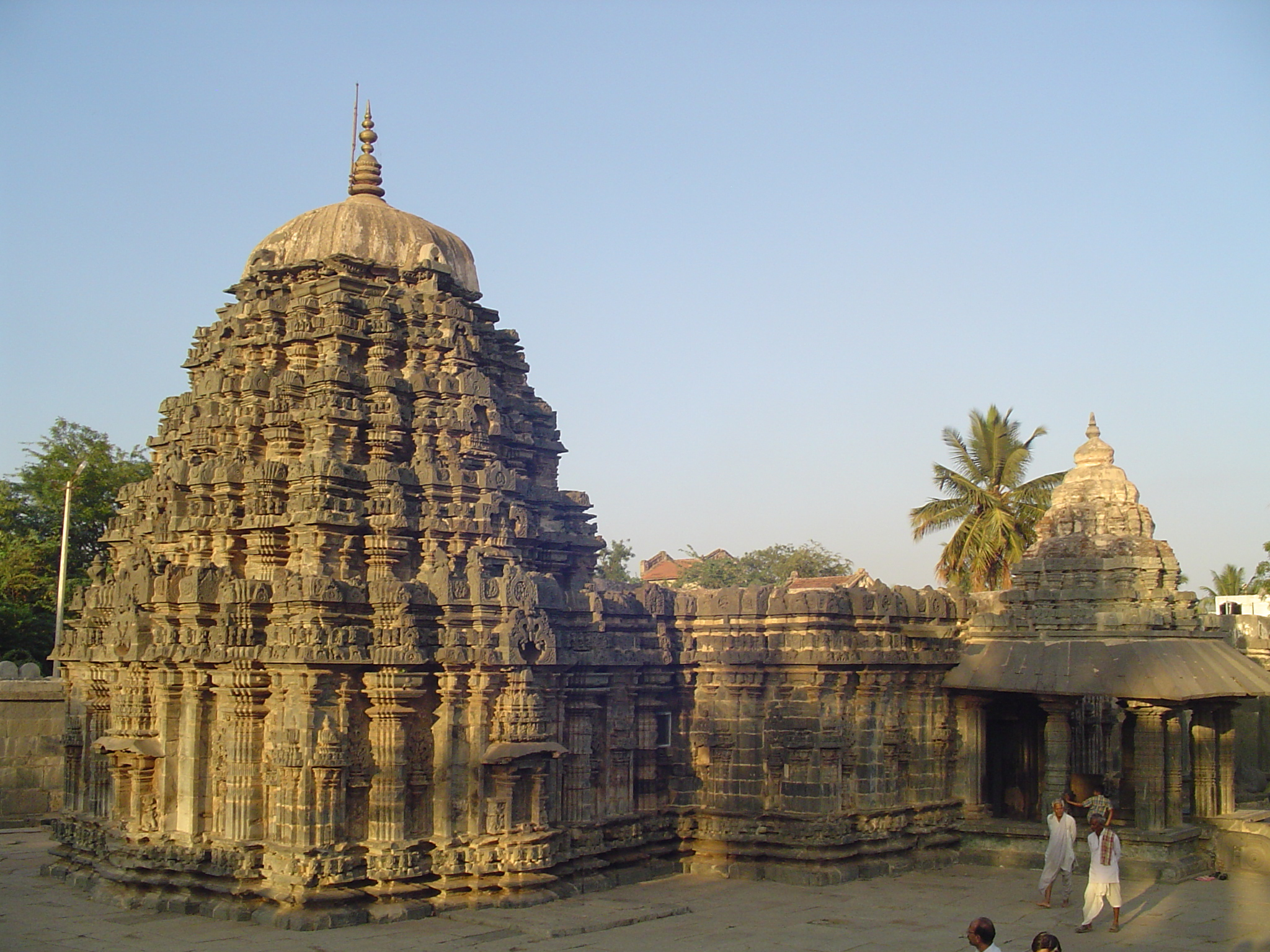
Amrtesvara Temple in Annigeri was built in the Dharwad district by Someshvara I in 1050 CE with dravida articulation. This was the first temple made entirely of soapstone

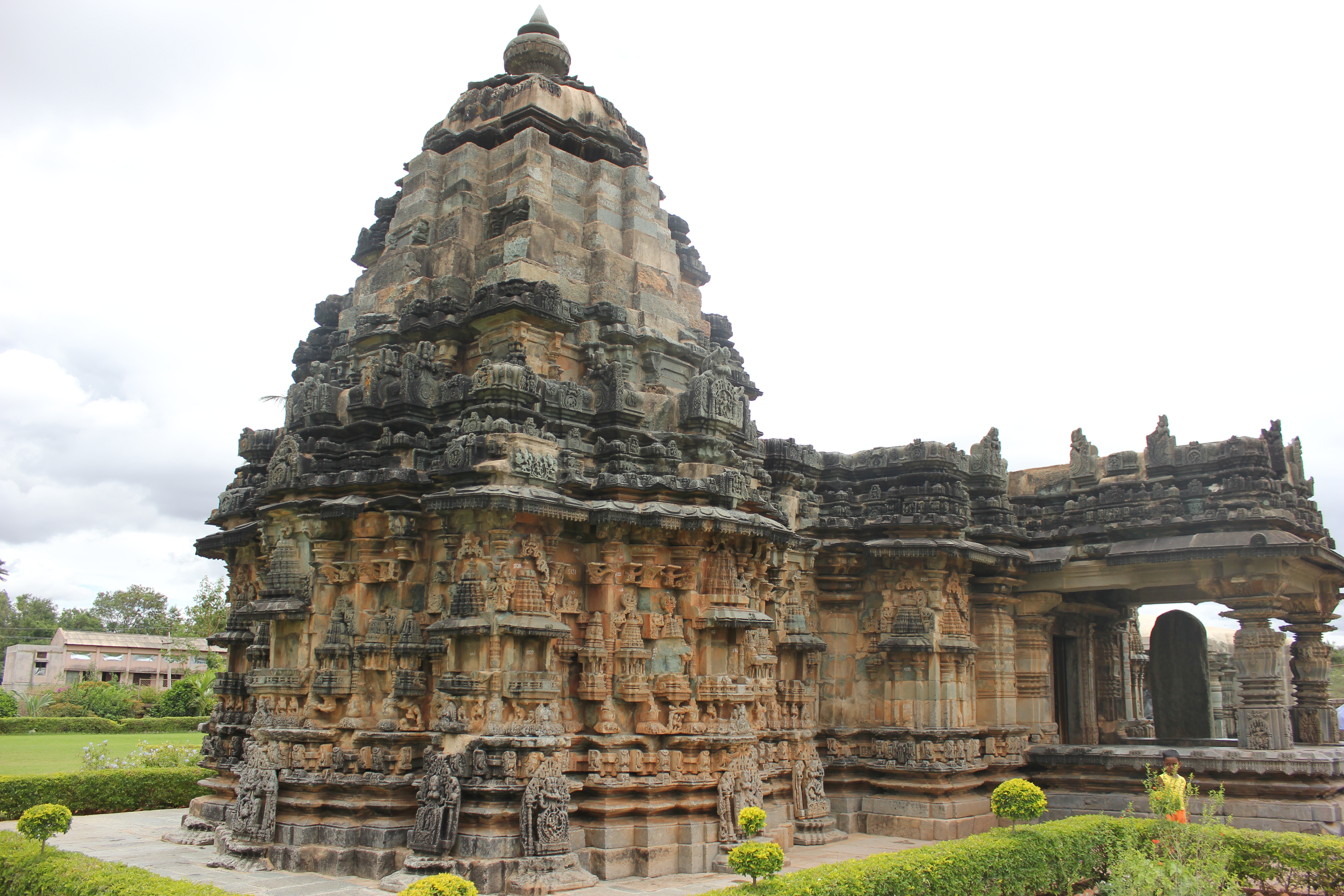
Kalleshwara Temple, Hire Hadagali built in 1057 CE by the Prime Minister to Someshvara I

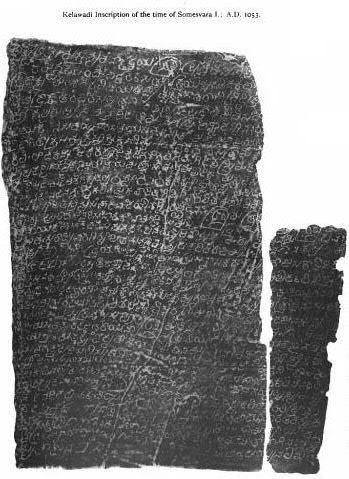
Old Kannada inscription (1053 CE) from Kelawadi of Western Chalukya king Someshvara I

Someshvara I (IAST: Someśvara; died 29 March 1068) was a king of the Western Chalukyas. Also known as "Ahavamalla" or "Trilokamalla", Someshvara succeeded his father Jayasimha II to the throne.

His several military successes in Central India made him a formidable ruler of a vast empire. During his rule, the Chalukyan empire extended to Gujarat and Central India in the north. The Hoysalas of the Malenadu (hill) regions of Mysore were his vassals in the South. Vinayaditya's daughter or sister called Hoysala Devi was one of his queens. In the west, Someshvara I retained control over the Konkan. In the east he was able to extend his influence up to Ananthapur and Kurnool. Despite many defeats during his wars with the Cholas of Tanjore, he managed to play king-maker at Vengi on several occasions.

According to the historian Ganguli, the Cholas "could not wrest from him any part of his kingdom". According to the historian Sen, Someshvara I's rule was a "brilliant period" in the history of the Western Chalukyas that would reach its zenith under Vikramaditya VI. Historian Tripathi claims the Chalukya influence was felt in far-off Eastern India as well. He shifted his capital from Manyakheta to Kalyani (present day Basavakalyana in modern Bidar district). He patronized the Kannada language scholar Shridharacharya who wrote Jatakatilaka (c.1049), the earliest available work on astrology in the language, and the now extinct Chandraprabhacharite on Belles-lettres (kavya kavite).

== Wars with the Cholas ==
According to the historian Kamath, soon after his coronation, Someshvara I interfered in the affairs of Vengi and invaded the region but faced defeat against the Chola monarch Rajadhiraja Chola (crowned in c.1044) at Amaravathi. The Cholas followed this by invading Chalukya territory. According to the historian Sastri, Rajadhiraja defeated Someshvara I in the battle of Dannada ("Dhanyakataka") on the banks of the Krishna River compelling the Western Chalukya armies to retreat, and the fort at Kollipakki (Kulpak) was razed to the ground. This was followed by victories at Kampili and Pundur. According to the historians Chopra et al., the details of the sack of Kampili is recorded in the Manimangalam inscription. A victory pillar with the Chola emblem was installed at Yetagiri (modern Yadgir in the Yadgir district). Finally, the Cholas plundered Kalyani, the Chalukya capital in c.1045. Rajadhiraja performed the Virabhisheka ("victory celebration") in the destroyed enemy capital and assumed the title Vijayarajendra ("victorious Rajendra"). However, according to Sastri and Sen, in a dramatic recovery, Someshvara I drove the Cholas out of Vengi by c.1050 and re-established his influence, not only in Vengi but also in Kalinga (modern day Orissa). Sen further claims Someshvara I took the battle right to the heart of the Chola empire. According to Kamath there was a Chalukya counterattack and a raid on Kanchipuram.

For a while the Cholas did not press their cause either in Vengi or Kalinga. However, in c.1054, the Cholas responded by invading Koppal (Koppam) where King Rajadhiraja Chola was killed and Someshvara I had to mourn the death of his brother Jayasimha. However, according to Sastri, the Cholas were able to convert defeat into victory when their crown prince Rajendra II (brother of Rajadhiraja) mounted a surprise counterattack and pushed the Chalukya armies back. Rajendra II crowned himself on the battlefield, mounted a victory pillar at Kollapura (modern Kohlapur) and returned to his capital Gangaikondacholapuram with much booty which including the Chalukya queens Sattiyavvai and Sangappai. Hostilities continued and in c.1059 Rajendra Chola II invaded the Chalukya kingdom but was defeated on the banks of the Tungabhadra River. Someshvara I constructed a temple at Annigeri in the modern Dharwad district to celebrate this success. However, according to Sen, in the battle of Mudakkarru on the banks of the Tungabhadra in c.1059, Someshvara I suffered another defeat.

Politics of succession erupted again over the Vengi throne in c.1061 after the death of the Eastern Chalukya King Rajaraja Narendra. Someshvara I installed Saktivarman II, son of Vijayaditya II, on the throne. This went against the wishes of the Cholas who wanted their own blood line from the Vengi family at the helm. The Cholas desired to crown Rajendra, son of the deceased king Rajaraja Narendra. There was a brief respite for Someshvara I over Vengi affairs but the new Chola monarch Rajendra II appears to have defeated Someshvara I in several encounters, including in a major battle at Kudalasangama (modern Koodli in the Shimoga district) in c.1062. The historians Chopra et al., claim this Kudalasangama was actually at the confluence of Krishna and Tungabhadra rivers. On this occasion, Someshvara I had sent two armies, one under his general Chamundaraya and another into Gangavadi (southern Mysore territory) under his sons prince Vikramaditya VI and Jayasimha. However, Rajendra II defeated both armies and thus Someshvara I's effort to erase the defeat at Koppal failed. In c.1063, Rajendra II and his son Rajamahendra died leading to the coronation of Virarajendra as the new Chola king.

=== Final battle of Kudalasangama ===
During a brief lull in hostilities, Someshvara I was busy reinforcing himself, militarily and diplomatically. In the east he counted on the Nagavamsi ruler Dharavarsha and the Eastern Ganga dynasty King Vajrahasta II of Kalinga as his allies. In Bezwada, he relied on the support of the Paramara dynasty prince Janannatha. In the west he stationed a large army under Vijayaditya. After a few brief encounters with the Cholas including a successful Chalukya raid of the Chola capital by prince Vikarmaditya VI, Someshvara I invited Virarajendra Chola to a battle at Kudalasangama. However, because of an incurable illness that afflicted him, Someshvara I's and his army did not show up at the venue. After a month-long wait Virarajendra invaded and was victorious at all fronts: Vengi, Bezwada, Kalinga and Chitrakuta (in the Nagavamsi domains), and a victory pillar was erected on the banks of the Tungabhadra. Unable to recover from his illness, Someshvara I committed ritual suicide (paramayoga) by drowning himself in the Tungabhadra river at Kuruvatti (modern Bellary district) on 29 March 1068.

== Success in the central and eastern India ==
During this time of constant conflict with the Cholas, according to Kamath and Sastri, Someshvara I dealt successfully with the Shilaharas of the North Konkan, the Seuna (Yadava) dynasty King Bhillama III, the Paramara dynasty King Bhoja of Dhara, the Chaulukyas of Gujarat and the Pratiharas of central India. Someshvara I plundered Dhar, Ujjain and Mandapa in central India and subjugated King Bhoja. The Chindaka Nagas of Bastar (the Nagavamsi dynasty of Chitrakuta) in central India were defeated by the Chalukya vassal Kakatiya dynasty King Prolla. According to Chopra et al., Someshvara I got the better of King Lakshmikarna of the Kalachuri dynasty of Tripuri (nearJabalpur) as well. Thus Someshvara I's control extended as far north as Vidharba and parts of modern Madhya Pradesh. According to the historian Tripathi, toward the end of his reign, under the leadership of his brilliant son Vikramaditya VI, Someshvara I's armies marched east with an eye on the Gangetic plains. Unchecked by the Chandela rulers and the Kacchapaghata rulers of central India, according to the Yewur inscription, Someshvara I's armies raided Kanyakubja whose king appears to have fled based on this line in the inscription: "quickly experiences an abode among the caves". The Chalukya armies marched further east, overwhelming the Kalachuri King Lakshmikarna of Madhyadesha and getting the better of the kingdoms of Mithila, Magadha, Anga, Vanga and Gouda. The Palas appear to have posed no resistance either. Eventually, Someshvara's I armies were stopped by the king of Kamarupa (in modern Assam). The Chalukya armies returned home through Southern Kosala, raiding the Chindaka Naga capital of Chakrakota.
