= Kulothunga Chola =

Kulothunga was the name of several later Chola kings in India:

- Kulothunga I, reigned 1070–1120
- Kulothunga II, reigned 1135–1150
- Kulothunga III, reigned 1178–1218
