= Rajadhiraja II =

Chola emperor from 1166 to 1178

Rajadhiraja Chola II இரண்டாம் இராஜாதிராஜ சோழன்
- Rajakesarivarman, Edirilla Cholan, Ediriliperumal, Karikala
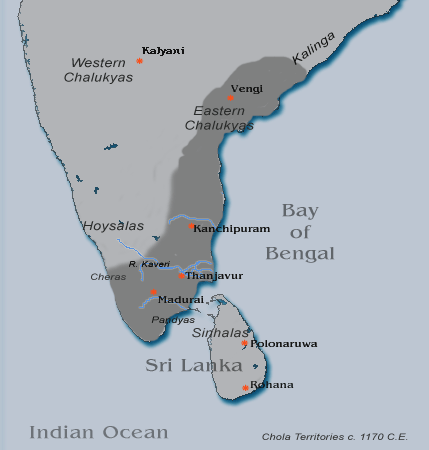
- Chola territories during c. 1170 CE
- Reign: c. 1166 – c. 1178 CE
- Predecessor: Rajaraja Chola II
- Successor: Kulothunga Chola III
- Born: Nallama chola Kanchi
- Died: 1178 CE
- House: Cholas
- Dynasty: Chola
- Father: Sangama chola (aka) Nēriyudaiperumal
- Religion: Hinduism

Rajadhiraja Chola II (1166–1178 CE) reigned as the Chola emperor succeeding Rajaraja Chola II. Rajaraja Chola II chose Rajadhiraja II, a maternal grandson of Vikrama Chola as he had no sons. Rajadhiraja II's father was Sangama chola (Neriyudai Perumal) who was the descendant of Virarajendra chola. Hence a century later the real Chola heir ascended the chola throne.

Soon after the installation of Rajadhiraja II, a fierce succession dispute in the Pandya country led to the intervention of the Chola and the Sinhalese rulers on opposite sides which brought misery to both. Out of the ashes of this civil war arose the Pandya power which in its renewed strength soon swallowed both the Chola and Sinhalese kingdoms.

== Accession ==
According to the Pallavarayanpettai inscription, towards the end of Rajaraja II's reign, the chief Kulatullan Tirucirrambalamudaiyan Perumannambi alias Pallavaraiyar brought to the king's notice that there were no sons of eligible age to ascend the throne. Accordingly, having enquired around about the other princes, he chose and brought Ediriliperumal the son of Neriyudaiperumal and the grandson of Vikrama Chola from the palace at Gangaikondacholapuram. Rajaraja II then made this prince as heir-apparent. Four years after this event, when Rajaraja II died, the chief Pallavarayar got Ediriliperumal or Edhirilla Cholan anointed as the king with the title Rajadhiraja Chola II. He then safely escorted Rajaraja II's two sons aged one and two to another location as he believed that it was no longer safe for them to continue living in the palace. According to some historians, Neriyudaiperumal the father of Rajadhiraja Chola II was a brother of Kulothunga Chola II and another son of Vikrama Chola.

== Pandya Civil War ==
After the conquest of the Pandya country by Kulothunga Chola I, the local Pandya princes were allowed to rule as they liked, subject to a vague suzerainty of the Cholas. Some of the Pandyas were loyal to the Cholas as can be seen by one Parantaka Pandya took part in Kulothunga I's Kalinga campaigns. But after Kulothunga I, the Cholas lost any little control they had over the Pandyas. There are hardly any inscriptions to be found in the Pandya country after the reign of Kulothunga Chola I.

About 1166 C.E. Parakrama Pandya in Madurai, and Kulasekara quarrelled about the succession and Kulasekara attacked Madurai. Parakrama appealed to the Lanka king Parakramabahu I. Before the Sinhala help could reach Parakrama, Kulasekara took Madurai and killed Parakarama, his wife and some of his children. The Sinhala king instructed his general to continue to war until Kulasekara is defeated and the Pandaya throne was bestowed upon a son of Parakrama Pandya.

Kulasekara put up a good fight and the Sinhala forces had to get reinforcements from Lanka. Kulasekara then appealed to Rajadhiraja Chola II, and a large force was sent to his aid. However Kulasekara lost his fight against the Lankan forces. The Lankan general installed Virapandya, a son of Parakrama Pandya on the throne. The fight continued between the Chola forces and that of the Sinhala. The Chola army soon defeated the Sinhalese forces and drove them back to the island. In the fight annan pallavarayan, chola general beheaded two sinhala generals lankapuri thandanayagan and jagathvisaya thandanayagan and many other soldiers. The two generals head were installed in pandya fort after cholas make Kulasekara as pandya king.

Parakramabahu prepared a counter offensive against the Chola mainland. On hearing this the Chola general induced Srivallabha, a rival of Parakramabahu to the Sinhala throne to undertake an invasion of the Lanka island. A naval expedition landed in Lanka and attacked and destroyed many places. Seeing the damage his support of Parakrama Pandya had brought to him, Parakramabahu recognised Kulasekara as the rightful king of the Pandyas, and entered into an alliance with him against the Cholas. Cholas discovered Kulasekara's treachery and changed their policy at once. After further fighting, the Cholas set up Virapandya on the Pandya throne and drove Kulasekara into exile

== Empire weakens ==
The growing independence of the local feudatories and chieftains started during Rajaraja Chola II became more pronounced in Rajadhiraja's reign. They began to extend more and more of their influences in the central government. This manipulation of the king's authority undermined the central administration to effectively exercise its control over the local government areas of the country.

The growth of these feudatories had two consequences. The first was to weaken the prestige of the king's government by increasingly restricting the sphere of its influence and thereby to loosen its hold the rest of the administration. Secondly they began to form alliances and compacts with each other to convert the official positions they held within the Chola nobility into a hereditary right.

== Death and succession ==
Kulothunga Chola III, the successor of Rajadhiraja Chola II dates his reign from 1178 CE in his inscriptions, "though Rajadhiraja Chola II lived up to 1182 AD". Rajadhiraja Chola II was Kulothunga Chola III's guardian and he made him his co-regent while he was still very young. This indicates that Rajadhiraja Chola II was succeeded by Kulothunga Chola III, when he was alive, in 1178 CE and Rajadhiraja II lived up to 1182 CE. Rajadhiraja Chola was known to have raised flower gardens around the place.

Preceded by Rajaraja Chola II	Chola; 1166–1178 CE	Succeeded by Kulothunga Chola III
