= Rajaraja II =

Chola emperor from 1150 to 1173

- KoParakesarivarman Rajagambeeran
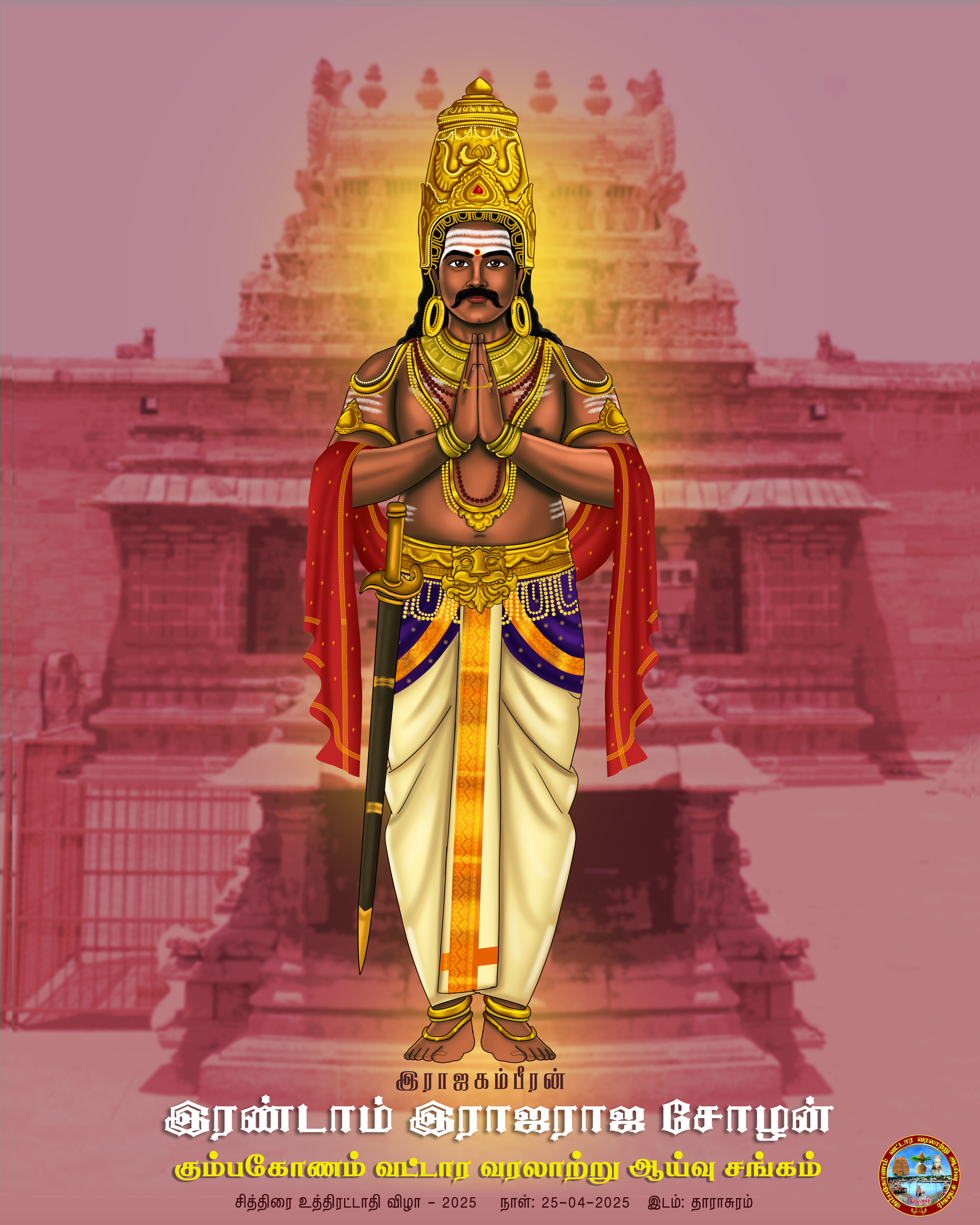
- Rajaraja Chola II

Chola Emperor
- Reign: 1150–1173
- Predecessor: Kulothunga II
- Successor: Rajadhiraja II

Co-Regent of the Chola Empire
- Reign: 1146–1150
- Emperor: Kulothunga II
- Predecessor: Kulothunga II
- Successor: Rajadhiraja II
- Born: Chithirai Uthirattadhi; Gangaikonda Cholapuram, Chola Empire (modern day Jayankondam, Tamil Nadu, India)
- Died: 1173; Gangaikonda Cholapuram, Chola Empire (modern day Jayankondam, Tamil Nadu, India)
- Burial: Rajarajachadurvedhimangalam
- Empresses: Avanimulududaiyal; Bhuvanimulududiyal; Ulagudai Mukkokilan
- House: Chalukya Cholas
- Dynasty: Chola
- Father: Kulothunga II
- Mother: Tyaagavalli
- Religion: Hinduism

Rajaraja II was a Chola emperor who reigned from 1150 to 1173. He was made his heir apparent and co-regent in 1146 and so the inscriptions of Rajaraja II count his reign from 1146. Rajaraja's reign began to show signs of the coming end of the dynasty.

== Beginning of disintegration ==
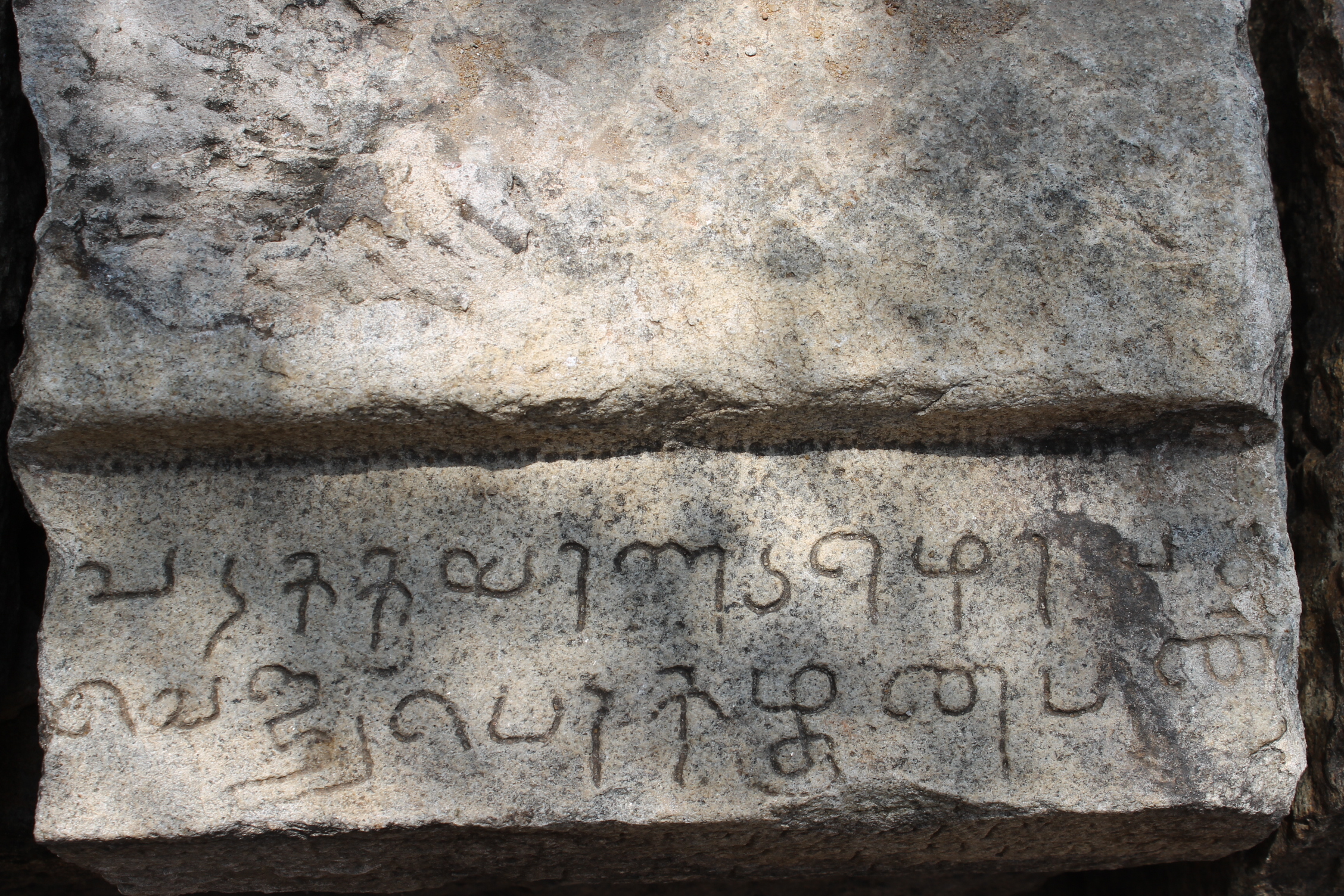
Middle Tamil inscriptions at the Airavatesvarar Temple

The extent of the Chola territories remained as it was during Rajaraja's predecessors. The Vengi country was still firmly under the Chola rule.

The Chola central administration did show weaknesses with regard to their control and effective administration over the outlying parts of the empire, which became pronounced towards the end of Raja Raja-II's reign. However, Rajaraja regained adequate control of provinces like Vengi, Kalinga, Pandya and Chera territories. He probably even invaded Sri Lanka as is explained in one of the Tamil poems written during his time. This is borne out by the fact that not just Rajaraja, but also his successors like Kulothunga III bore titles like Tribhuvana Chakravartin attesting to their military capabilities and cultural achievements.

During the last years of Rajaraja's reign, a civil unrest as a result of a succession dispute convulsed the Pandya country, further weakening Chola influence there. This was only to be expected as even though the Pandyas were subjugated by the Cholas since the time of Aditya I and were firmly controlled until the time of Virarajendra, the Madurai kingdom nevertheless kept making efforts from time to time, for gaining their independence from their occupiers. Later Pandyas like Maravarman or Maravaramban Sundara Pandyan, Jatavarman Vira Pandyan and Jatavarman Sundara Pandyan steadily went on increasing their power and prestige and were to emerge as the most powerful kingdom in South India during the period 1200–1300. These developments were to slowly but surely weaken the Chola kingdom, though there was a minor revival during the fairly steady rule of Kulothunga III (1178–1218).

In as much as the cholas during his time were dominant militarily is noted by some literature that mention Raja Raja's conquest and his innovative management initiatives. Here is excerpt from an inscription of his from the Rajagopala Perumal temple:

..Having won the heart (of the goddess) of the earth for countless ages, (he) was pleased to be seated on the throne of heroes, (made) of pure gold..
while the Villavar (Cheras), Telungar, Minavar (Pandyas),..and other kings prostrated themselves (before him). In the 8th year (of the reign) of (this) king Parakesarivarman, alias the emperor of the three worlds, Sri-Rajarajadeva.

== Death and succession ==
The last regnal year cited in Rajaraja's inscription is 26. That makes the last year of his reign 1173. Rajaraja was not destined to live long. Rajaraja did not have any suitable direct descendant to ascend the Chola throne so he chose Rajadhiraja Chola II a grandson of Vikrama Chola as his heir. According to the Pallavarayanpettai inscription, Rajaraja died four years after he made Rajadhiraja Chola II as heir-apparent. Since, Rajadhiraja himself was quite young, he would require the help of Pallavarayar to usher the young sons of Rajaraja to safety. According to the inscription, Pallavarayar took steps immediately after the death of Rajaraja for the protection of the king's children, aged one and two years. According to historian Krishnaswami Aiyangar, Kulothunga Chola III who is widely considered as the last great Chola sovereign was the son of Rajaraja II.

== Socio-religious achievements ==
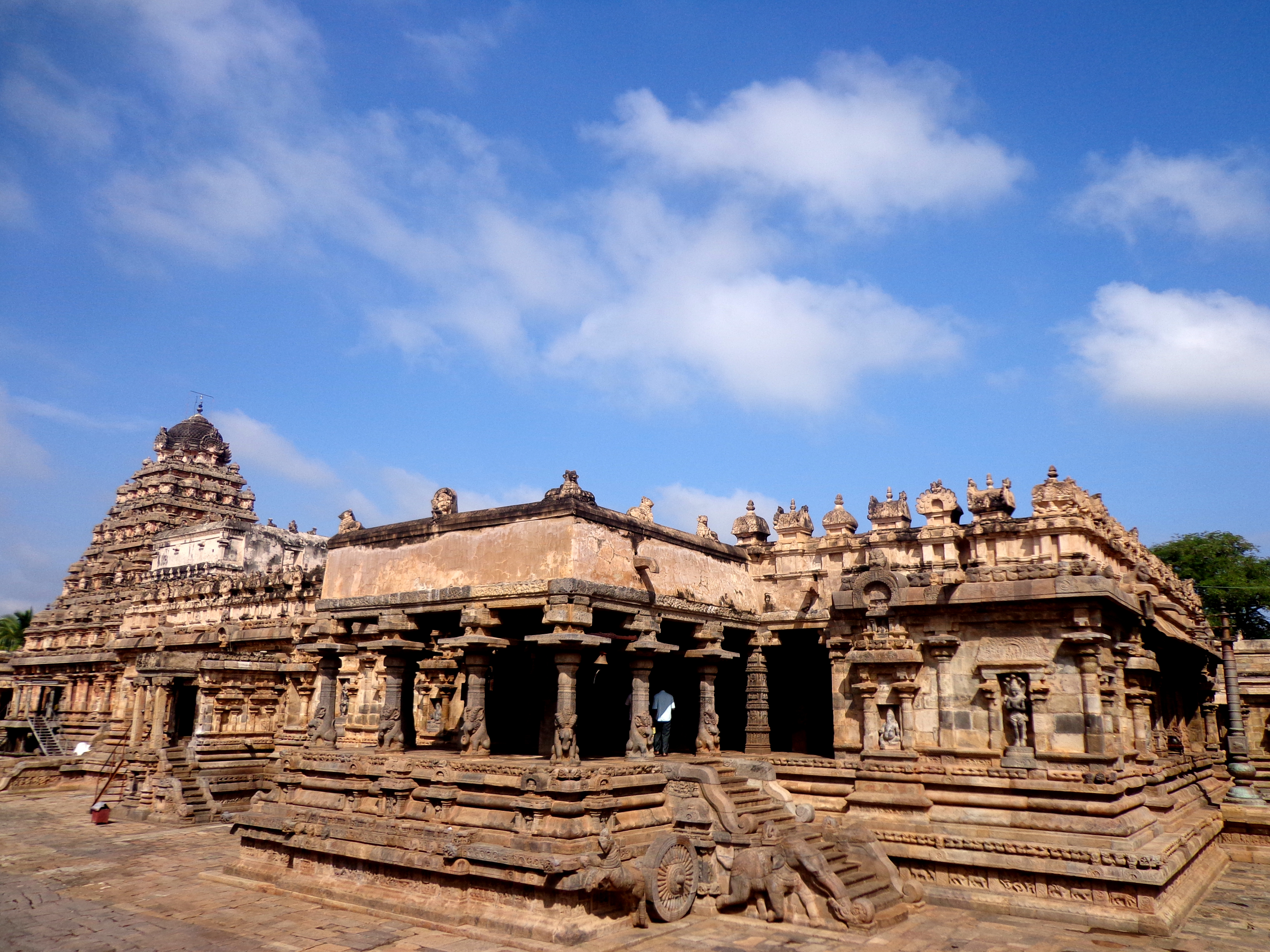
Airavateswarar Temple, Darasuram

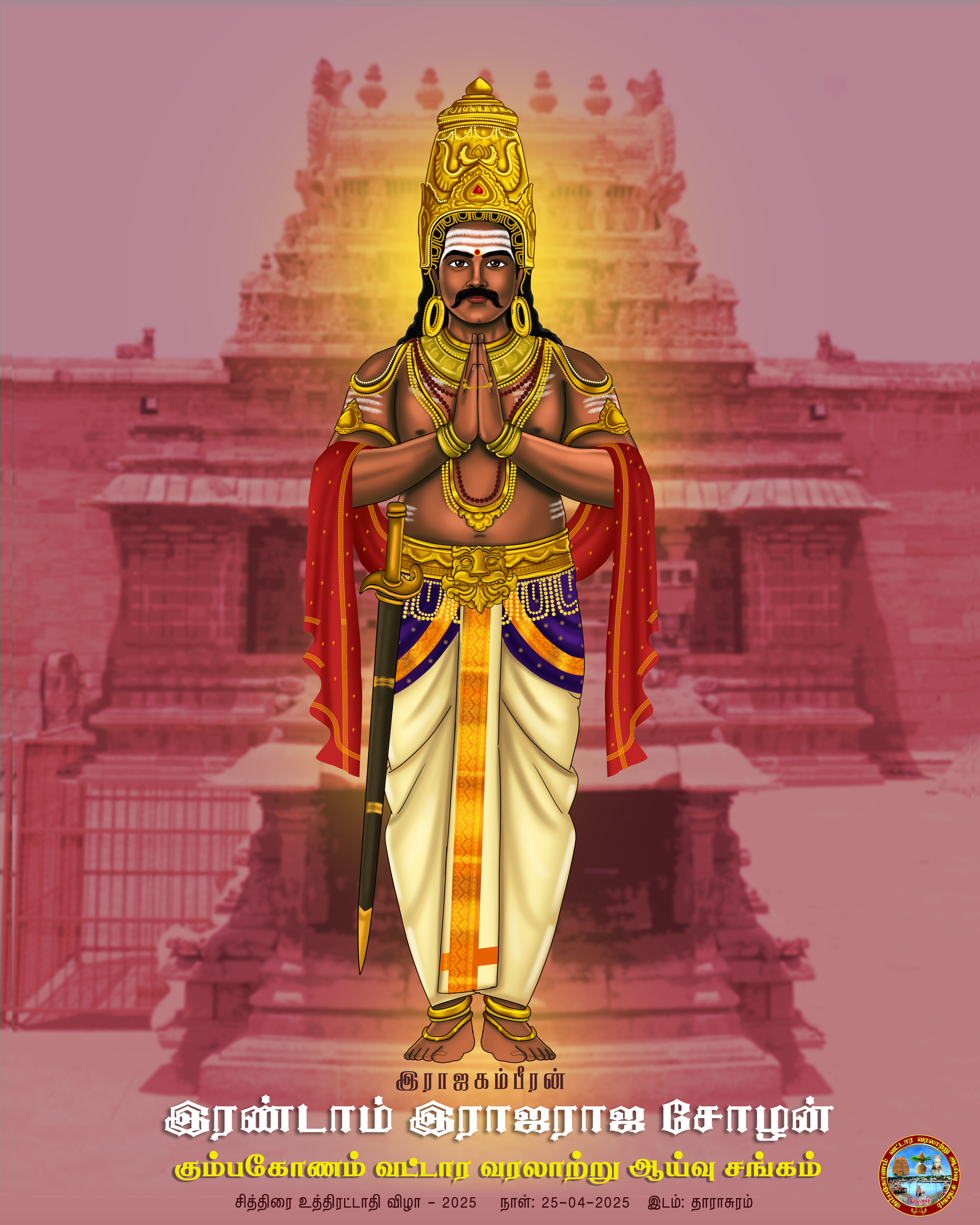
Rajaraja-2

One of the most important achievements of Rajaraja II was that despite being considered a weak king, it appears that he did enjoy periods of calm and peace especially during the later half of his 26-year rule. It was during this period that he initiated construction of the Airavatesvarar Temple at Darasuram, Kumbakonam, a World Heritage Site. The Airavateswarar Temple was completed either by the time his rule ended or during the initial period of his successor, Rajadhiraja II. The temple contains innumerable miniature freezes containing stories from Ramayanam, Periya Puranam and other stories devoted to Siva-Parvati, Vinayagar, Karthikeya etc. It also has musical stairs called the Saptasvaras near a small shrine for Ganapati. The Mukhamandapam or the Mukhyamandapam of this temple is a real architectural marvel containing many great architectural specimen and was a continuation of the Later Chola tradition of building temples in the shape of giant elephant-driven Rathas or Chariots as like as in Melakadambur siva temple built by Kulothunga I, which was also carried on not just by later Chola kings such as Kulothunga III but also by the kings of Kalinga and culminated in construction of the SunTemple of Konarak by Eastern Ganga king Narasinghdeo.

Rajaraja also made numerous grants to the temples at Tanjore (Tanjavur), Chidambaram, Kanchi, Srirangam, Trichy (Thiruchirapalli) as well as to the temples at Madurai. He was also believed to be a regular visitor to the temples in Parasurama's country (Kerala), which were also recipients of his grants. During his time the chola navies did remain dominant in the western sea as well as eastern sea.

Overall he was a benevolent king who did put up good administrative processes, including efficient revenue generation systems as evidenced by his relief measures to the people during the times of both the famine and civil unrest, which though did take some effort to subdue, but which finally ensured that he retained the loyalty and respect of his ministers, commanders and the general sections of the populace.

== Extent of the empire and summary of the rule ==
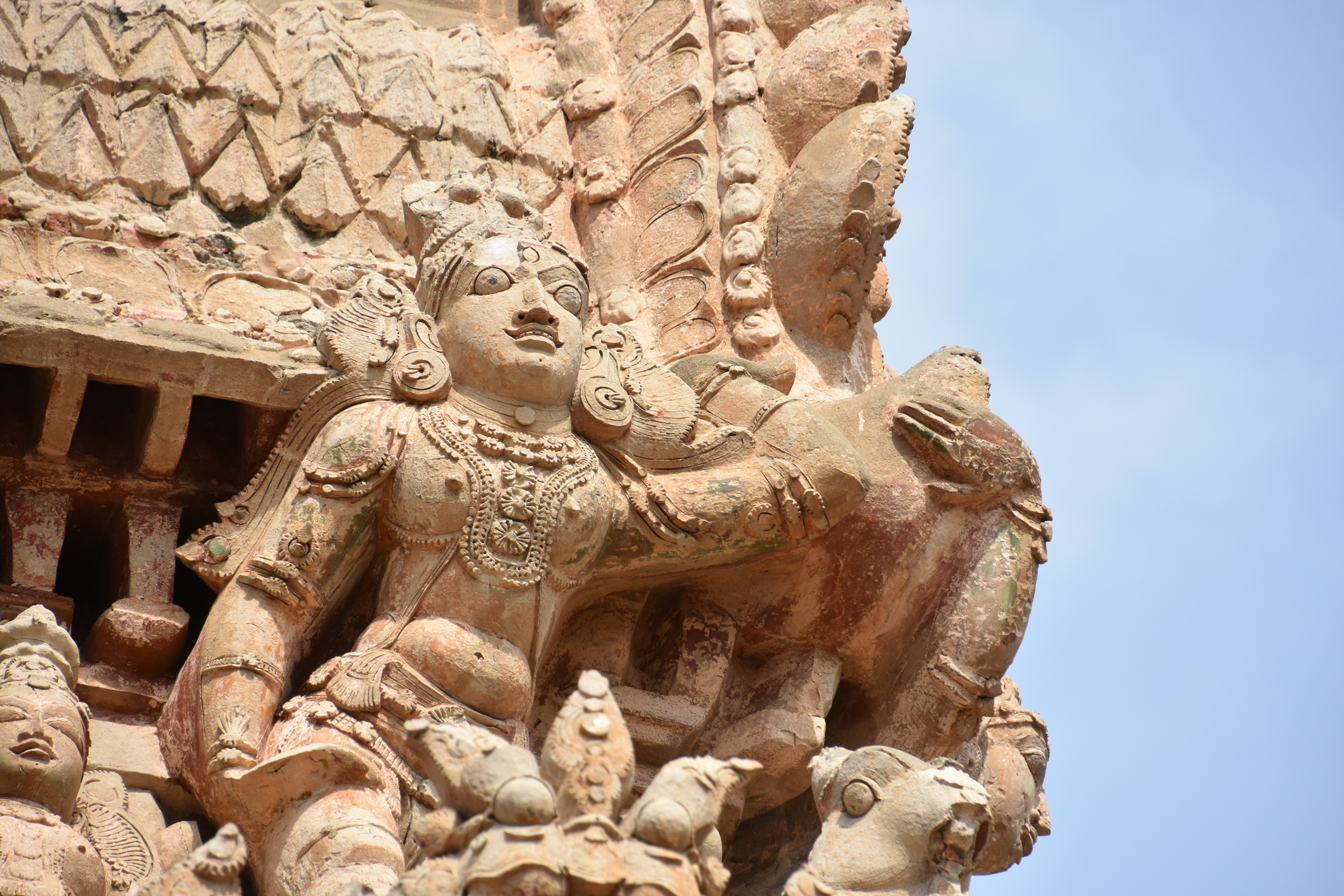
Sculpture Depicting Shiva

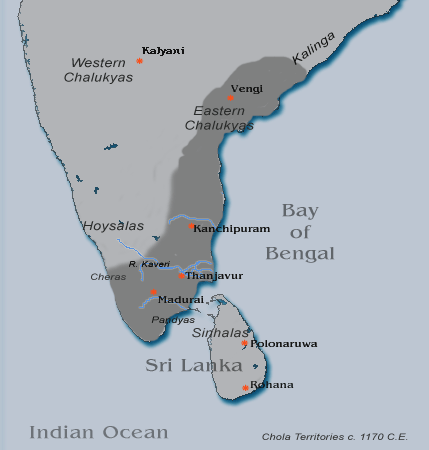
Chola territories during 1170.

Even though there was a famine which further caused a civil disturbance, Raja Raja-II nevertheless, kept most of his adversaries under control and also succeeded in largely maintaining the Chola territories consisting of their possessions in Tamilakam including Kongunadu, Madurai and Thirunelveli, Nellore-Guntur areas (with Renandu and Telugu Cholas having allegiance to Raja Raja-II but controlling their areas with more authority than before), Visaiyavadai(Vijayawada)-Eluru-Rajahmundry-Prakasham (Draksharama) areas traditionally controlled by Vengi kings, Kalinga (whose King was a tribute paying subordinate and a supportive feudatory to Chola overlordship).. up to the banks of Hooghly. In addition, he also had Northern Sri Lanka (as was the case during the time of his illustrious predecessor, Raja Raja-I) under his loose control while as compared to before, even though he had subdued Chera kings, due to the re-emergence of Pandya power, he was forced to allow more autonomy to Malainadu kings with whom he was believed to be having marital relations. But somehow, Raja Raja-II proved not strong enough to regain control of the eastern Gangavadi province, which was lost to the Hoysalas by his predecessor, the great Vikrama Chola. Possibly, the Hoysalas themselves were trying to free themselves from the control of Western Chalukyas and other rapidly growing adversaries like Kalachuris and Kakatiyas, who were as hostile to the Chalukyas and Hoysalas, as they were to the Cholas and even the Pandyas, as would be evidenced in the later years.
