= Pambar River =

Pambar is the name of three rivers in South India:

- Pambar River (Northern Tamil Nadu)
- Pambar River (Southern Tamil Nadu)
- Pambar River (Kerala)
