= Ponnaiyar River =

River in southern India

South Pennar Thenpennai Ponnaiyar Dakshina Pinakini
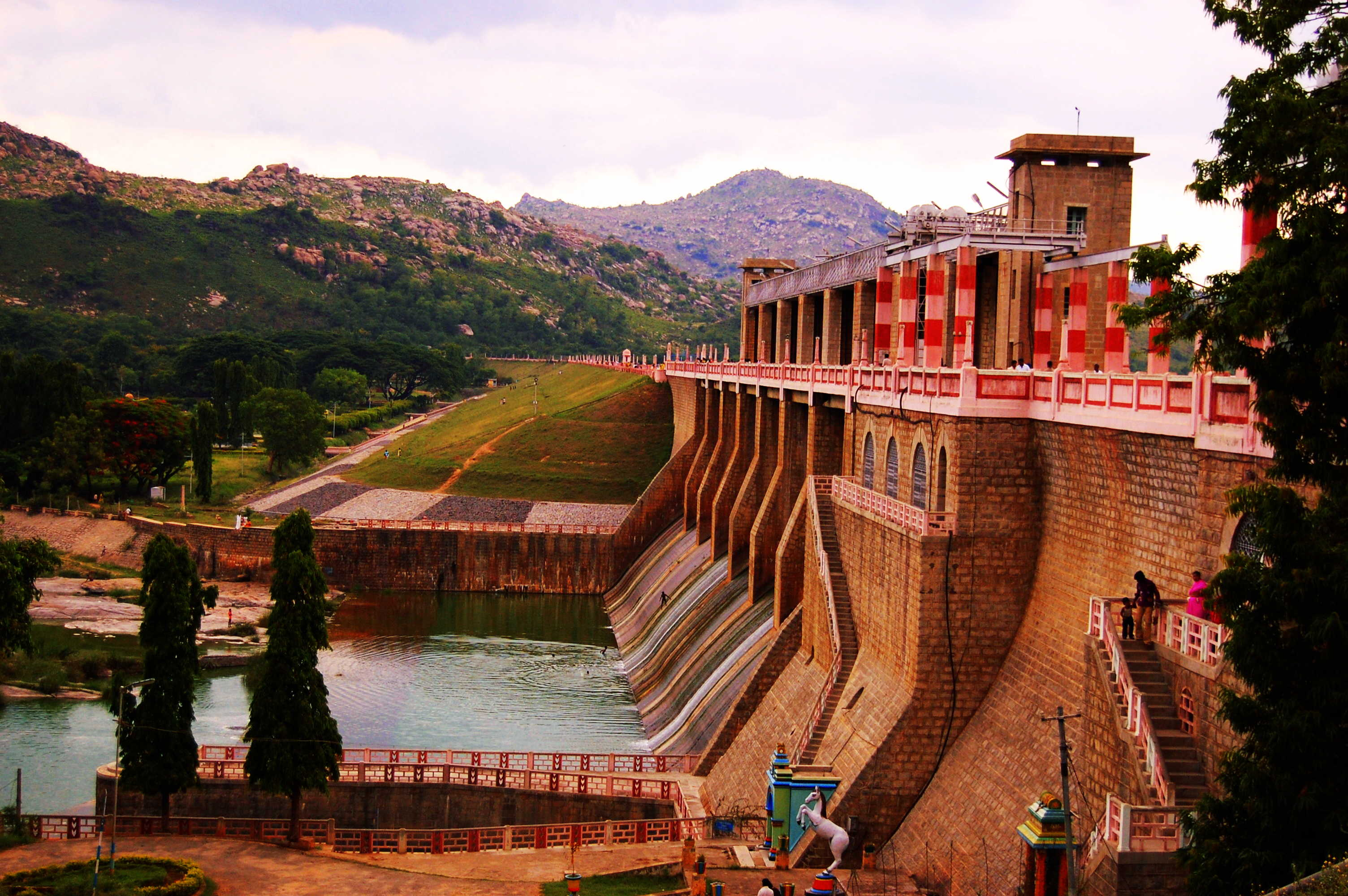
- Krishnagiri Dam across the river

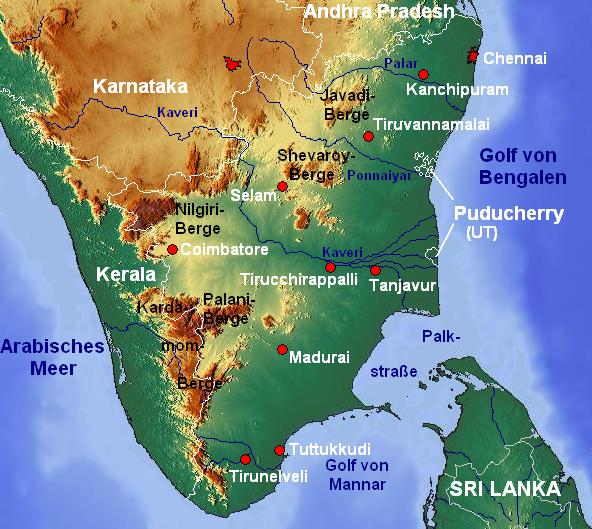
- Map of the South Pennar river flowing through Karnataka and Tamil Nadu

Location
- Country: India
- States: Karnataka and Tamil Nadu
- Largest city: Bengaluru
- Cities: Chikkaballapura; Bengaluru; Hosur; Krishnagiri; Kaveripattinam; Tiruvannamalai; Cuddalore

Physical characteristics
- Source: Nandi Hills
  - location: Chikkaballapura, Karnataka
  - elevation: 1,276 m (4,186 ft)
- Mouth: Bay of Bengal
  - location: Cuddalore, Tamil Nadu
  - coordinates: 11.772°N 79.7945°E
  - elevation: 0 m (0 ft)
- Length: 500 km (310 mi)

Basin features
- Tributaries
  - left: Pambar River
  - right: Vanniyar River

The South Pennar River (also known as Dakshina Pinakini in Kannada and Thenpennai or Ponnaiyar or Pennaiyar in Tamil) is a river in India. It is the second longest river in Tamil Nadu, with a length of 497 km, after the Kaveri. Chandapura, Anekal, Hosur, Bagalur and Chengam are the major industrial settlements on its banks. The river is severely polluted by industrial waste as it flows through major industrial areas in the eastern suburbs of Bengaluru and the industrial parks of Hosur and Chengam.

The river originates in the Nandi Hills in the Chikkaballapura district of Karnataka and flows through Tamil Nadu before emptying into the Bay of Bengal. It has a catchment area of 1,424 square miles (3,690 km^{2}) located in Karnataka and Tamil Nadu states. Nearly 100 square miles basin area is also located in Andhra Pradesh state. Kelavarapalli and Krishnagiri Dams were built across this river near Hosur and Krishnagiri. The largest dam on this river, Sathanur Dam with 7.3 Tmcft Gross Capacity is near Tiruvannamalai. The Moongilthuraipattu Sugar Factory is also situated on the bank of river.

The river is dry most of the year. Water flows during the monsoon season when it is fed by the south-west monsoon in the catchment area and the northeast monsoon in Tamil Nadu. This water flow raises the water table throughout the river basin and feeds numerous reservoirs/tanks.

The old river Dakshina Pinakini no longer exists. A substantial part of Bangalore's sewage enters this river via Bellandur and Varthur Lakes and other channels.

The sand buildup in the riverbed is quite impressive, suggesting that it may have been a perennial river with much larger water flow in the past. Mentions of the river are found in Sangam and medieval (Tevaram - Bhakti cult era) literature, where it is depicted as rich with lush vegetation on its banks. There are famous temples on its banks like Penneswaraar Temple, Shree Venkateshwara Swamy temple, Dakshina Tirupati, Veerateshwarar Temple and Kabilar Kundru . It is used to irrigate Chikkaballapur district, Bengaluru North district, Bengaluru Urban district, Kolar district, Krishnagiri district, Dharmapuri district, Tiruvannamalai, Viluppuram district, and Cuddalore district. It splits into a delta on which Cuddalore town is located.

The river is now looted for its rich abundance of sand. As the water flow will be only in monsoon seasons, the river is dry during the rest of the year.

== See also ==
- Arkavathy River
- Palar River
- Penneswaraar Temple
