= Moongilthuraipattu =

Moongilthuraipattu Aathangarai, Sakkarai Aalai
- Village
- Location in Tamil Nadu, India
- Coordinates: 12.4°N 79.24°E
- Country: India
- State: Tamil Nadu
- District: kallakurichi
- Subdistrict: Sankarapuram

Languages
  - Official: Tamil
- Time zone: UTC+5:30 (IST)
- Postal code: 605702
- Telephone code: 04151

Moongilthuraipattu is a village panchayat in Sankarapuram taluk of kallakurichi district in the state of Tamil Nadu. It is on the banks of Thenpennai (South Pennar River) river. It is located on State Highway SH-6 which connects Tiruvannamalai and Kallakurichi. The village has a sugar mill and it is established and run by Tamil Nadu Co-operative Sugar Federation Ltd. The main source of income is sugar and sugar cane-based agriculture.

== Sugar mill ==
The Kallakurichi co-operative sugar mill and its associated industry are the major source of income. The mill was commissioned on 12 February 1967 with original crushing capacity of 1000 TCD. The sugar mill was expanded over a period of time and its current crushing capacity is 2500 TCD as of 31 July 2009.

== Educational institutions ==
Government Higher Secondary School is on the south side of the village and sugar mill owned K.C.S.M. Matriculation High School is on the north side.

1. Government Higher Secondary School
2. KCSM Matric Hr Sec School
3. Don Bosco High School
4. St. Mary's High School
5. Panchayat Union Primary School, Moongilthuraipattu Old
6. Panchayat Union Primary School, Poruvalur( One is West Side & Another one is North Side)

== Transport ==
Nearest Railway Station is at Tiruvannamalai 22 km from Moongilthuraipattu. State Highway SH-6 which connects Thiruvannaamalai and Kallakurichi. Shortest routes are there for Tirukoilur, Chengam and Sathanur Dam.

== Hospitals ==
Government Aaramba Sugathara Nilayam
