= Kulothunga III =

Chola emperor from 1178 to 1218

- Chakravartigal; KoParakesarivarman
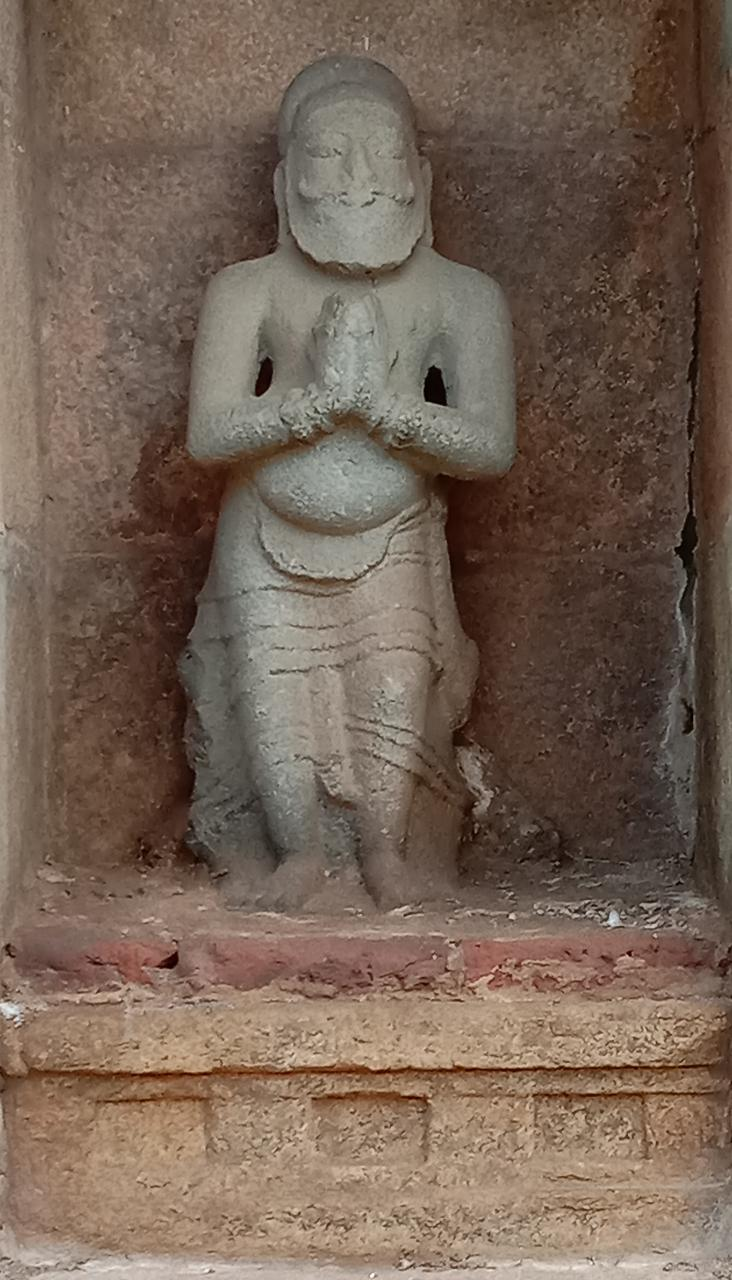
- Statue of Kulothunga III at Brihadisvara Temple.

Chola Emperor
- Reign: c. 7 July 1178–1218 (Note: Kulothunga III became king on either 6, 7, or 8 July 1178.)
- Predecessor: Rajadhiraja II
- Successor: Rajaraja III
- Born: Kumara Kulothungan; Kanchipuram, Chola Empire (modern day Tamil Nadu, India)
- Died: 1218; Gangaikonda Cholapuram, Chola Empire (modern day Jayankondam, Tamil Nadu, India)
- Empress: Bhuvanamuludaiyal
- House: Cholas
- Dynasty: Chola
- Father: Sangama Chola (aka) Nēriyudaiperumal
- Mother: Unknown
- Religion: Hinduism

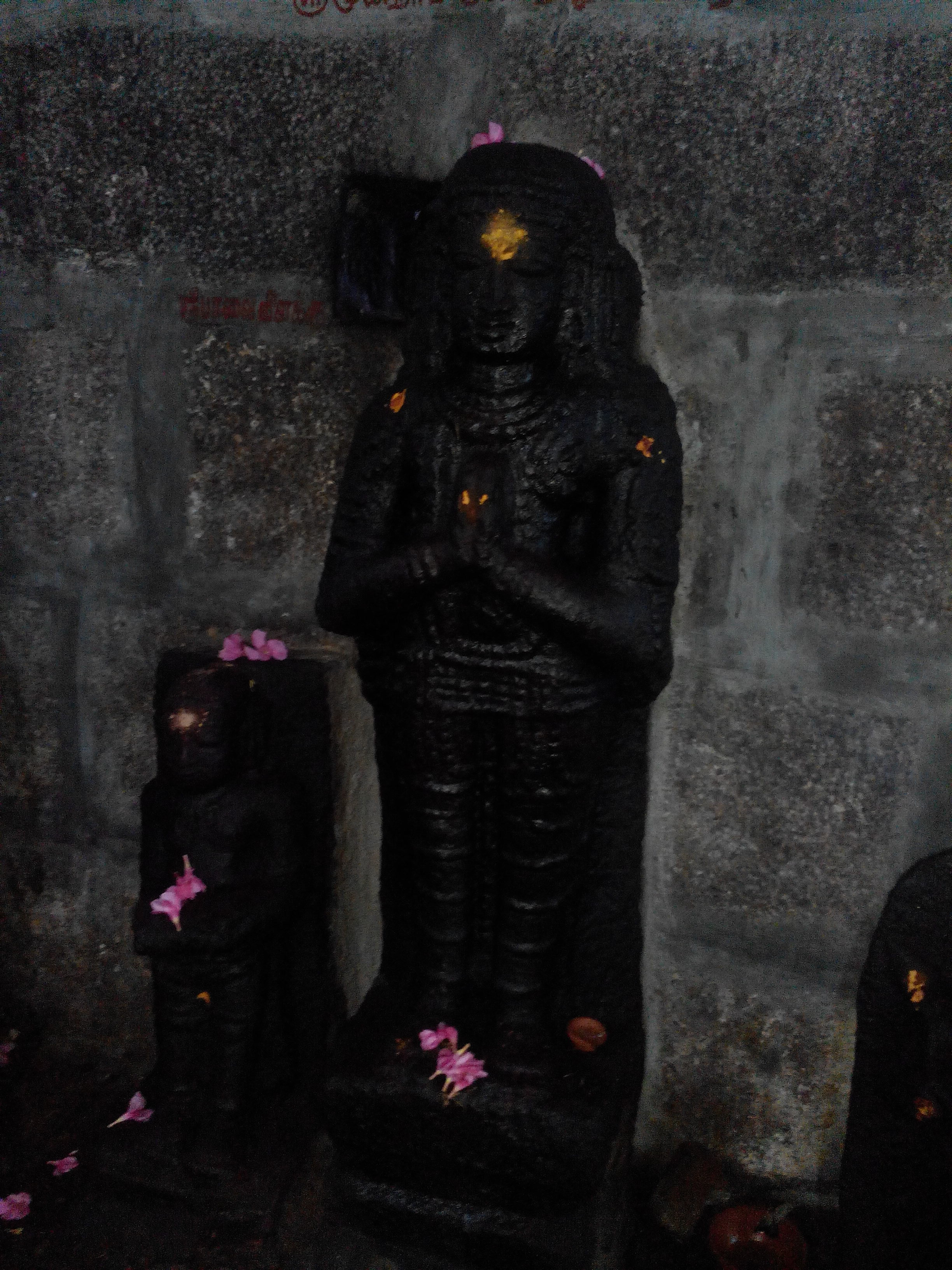
Statue of Kulothunga III and his Queen Bhuvanamuludaiyal at Penneswaraar Temple.

Kulothunga III was a Chola emperor who ruled from c. 7 July 1178 to 1218. He ascended the throne after succeeding his elder brother Rajadhiraja II. Kulothunga Chola III gained success in war against his traditional foes. He gained victories in war against the Hoysalas, Pandyas of Madurai, Cheras of Venad, the Sinhalese kings of Polonnaruwa, as well as the Telugu Cholas of Velanadu and Nellore. He also restored Chola control over Karur, which were ruled by the Adigaman chiefs as vassals of the Cholas. He drove out the Hoysalas under Veera Ballala II who had made inroads in the Gangavadi and adjoining areas of Tagadur in Kongu country in an effort expand their territory. However, during the last two years of his reign, he lost in war to the resurgent Pandyas, heralded a period of steady decline and ultimately, demise of the Cholas by 1280 CE. Kulottunga III had alliances with the Hoysalas. The Hoysala king Veera Ballala married a Chola queen called Cholamahadevi and gave his daughter Somaladevi in marriage to Kulottunga III.

According to Sastri, "By his personal ability, Kulothunga Chola III delayed the disruption of the Chola empire for about a generation, and his reign marks the last great epoch in the history of Chola architecture and art as he himself is the last of the great Chola monarchs." He is credited with building a number of temples, including the Sarabeswara Temple at Tribhuvanam in Kumbakonam district, Tamil Nadu, as well as the renovation and repairs to the two temples proclaimed as tutelary deities of the Cholas, namely the Shiva temple at Chidambaram and the Sri Ranganathaswami Temple of Srirangam. Kulothunga Chola III is also renowned for his patronage of art and literature. In some of his numerous inscriptions, including those at the Srirangam temple, Kulothunga Chola III has described in his inscriptions his pride in wearing the crown of the race of the Sun to which the Chola emperors derived lineage from.

== Military campaigns ==
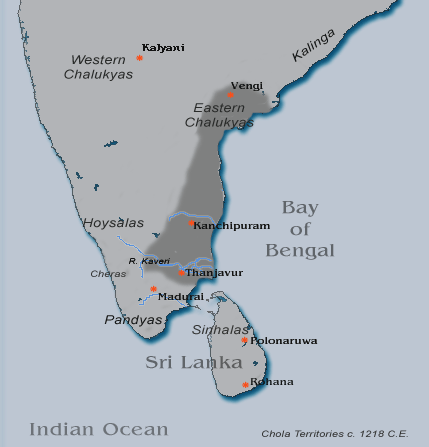
Chola territory under Kulothunga III. c.1219 CE

The reign of Kulothunga Chola III is a story of the triumph of the personal ability of the monarch against the forces of disruption that were steadily increasing in their number and in the intensity of their action. Kulothunga Chola III brought order to the besieged kingdom and reversed the weakness in the Chola administration that had set in during the rule of his predecessors Rajaraja Chola II and Rajadhiraja Chola II. During the rule of his predecessors Rajaraja Chola II and his successor Rajadhiraja Chola II between 1146–1178 CE, the hold of the central administration over the outlying parts of the empire was becoming less firm; and even at the centre, the administrative system was beginning to betray signs of weakness. Everywhere feudatory chieftains were becoming more and more assertive. The growing independence of the central power on the part of feudatories noticed in the reign of Rajaraja Chola II became more pronounced under Rajadhiraja Chola II. The Sambuvaraya, Kadavaraya, Malaiyaman chieftains and the Telugu-Chodas of Nellore were making wars and alliances in the northern half of the Chola kingdom without any reference to the ruling monarch.

=== Campaigns against the Pandyas(1182 CE, 1188–89 and 1205 CE) ===
Pandya affairs first claimed the attention of Kulothunga Chola III. The civil war in the Pandya country had not yet settled when he came to the throne, and the Chola forces were still involved in active fighting there. Kulothunga Chola III succeeded for the best part of his reign to continue the Chola hegemony on the Pandya kingdom. Parakramabahu of Sri Lanka, known as Ilangai in Tamil, renewed his efforts against the Cholas and even persuaded Pandya Emperor Vira Pandya to make common cause with him. Vikrama Pandya sought the help of Kulothunga Chola III against Vira Pandya, which led to an invasion of the Pandyan kingdom by Kulothunga Chola III. The battle resulted in the defeat of the Pandya and Sinhala forces, Vira Pandya was driven into exile, and Vikrama Pandya was installed on the throne of Madurai. This campaign ended before 1182. From his exile, with the aid of his allies, Vira Pandya made another effort to retrieve his fortune, but the attempt was stopped by Kulothunga Chola III on the battlefield of Nettur. Thence, Vira Pandya fled to Ceylon'. This was Kulothunga Chola III's first campaign in the Pandyan kingdom and he met with unprecedented success. The success in this war culminated in there being "no further fighting as both the ruler of Venad and Vira Pandya made up their minds to submit to Kulothunga Chola III and offered their obeisance to the open durbar (court) at Madurai, where Chola emperor performed a "Virabhishekam" and anointment of war heroes, who contributed to the Chola victory against the Pandyas and their allies from Sinhala and Venad kingdoms."

Between 1185–1186, Kulothunga Chola III undertook a second campaign against the Pandya King Vira Pandya following a rebellion by him and non-payment of tribute to his Chola overlord. This time, however, Pandya King Vira Pandya did not get the usual support from the Sinhala and Venad kingdoms. Kulothunga Chola III also seems to have grown from strength to strength, for in his first ten years, in addition to his feuds against his traditional enemies the Pandya and Sinhala kingdoms, he was able to reign on his traditional feudatories, who had taken advantage of the relatively weaker authority of Kulothunga Chola III's predecessors Rajaraja Chola II and Rajadhiraja Chola II and had started to assert their independence.

But even after attaining success while vanquishing the combined armies of his enemies, Kulothunga Chola III showed remarkable poise and dexterity in his conduct and treatment of the defeated adversaries. After being caught with his allies on the battlefield after trying to overthrow the Cholas from his exile, 'Vira Pandya was treated better than he had a right to expect. His life was spared and he was allowed some land and other wealth suited to his new station'. Possibly, Kulothunga Chola III also had a hand in the identification and enthronement of the next Pandya monarch Vikrama Pandya after his victory over Vira Pandya.

A few years after Kulothunga Chola III's campaigns in Kongu country to quell Hoysala incursions and restoration of Chola power in the area, the Pandya ruler Jatavarman Kulasekhara Pandyan, who 'succeeded Vikrama Pandyan in 1190 to the throne in Madurai, provoked Kulothunga Chola III by his insubordination. About 1205, Kulothunga Chola III led a third expedition into the Pandya country, sacked the capital and demolished the coronation hall of the Pandya'. The act of demolishing the Coronation Hall of a vanquished enemy is interpreted by historians as either being a conduct indicative of the weakness of his own position, or recognition by the Cholas of the steadily increasing power from 1150 CE of the Pandyas, who in any case never reconciled themselves to Chola suzerainty or domination, but were for the most part powerless in changing their subordinate position. The last quarter of the period 1150–1225 CE, in which Chola kings Rajaraja Chola II, Rajadhiraja Chola II and Kulothunga Chola III were prominent figures marks some high-points in terms of preservation and extension of traditional Chola territories between 1150–1200 CE, while the last part marks the emergence as the paramount imperial power of the Pandyas, culminating in their becoming the most powerful empire in the region between Deccan in the north, Kalinga in the east, the Konkan and Mysore plateau on the west and south west, and Kanniyakumari and Eelam or Ceylon in the south and south east respectively. The rise of the Pandyas between 1215–1230 CE contrasted directly with the decline of the Cholas which started during the last part of Kulothunga Chola III's reign, mainly between 1214–1217 CE.

=== War with Hoysalas (1187–1188 to 1215 CE) ===
After the second Pandya war, Kulothunga Chola III undertook campaign in Kongu to check the growth of Hoysala power in that quarter. Apparently, Hoysala King Veera Ballala II I tried to extend his rule beyond the Kaveri-Tungabhadra basin northwards to the Malaprabha basin in Kannada country. He had gained some success initially against the Western Chalukya King Someshvara IV and against the Yadava-Seuna Dynasty King Bhillama, both of whom he defeated in battle. However, Veera Ballala II had to face hostility initially between 1175–1180 CE from mainly the sons and successors of the Kalachuri king Bijjala of Tardavadi including Sovideva, Someshvara and Sangama between 1175–1185 CE. Though after the rule of King Bijjala, the Kalachuri had not been as strong and ruled in quick succession till 1183 CE, however, they succeeded in keeping up the hostilities against Hoysala Ballala II. The Kalachuris continued to war against the Hoysalas under Veera Ballala II (1173–1220). Faced with reverses from his enemies in the north Kannada country, Hoysala Veera Ballala II tried to expand his territory eastwards and made some inroads into the areas adjoining the Kongu country like Tagadur which were administered by Adigaiman chiefs as vassals of the Cholas.

As a result, by 1186–87, Kulothunga Chola III who wound up his expedition against the Pandyan kingdom, had to deal immediately with the incursion of the Hoysala Veera Ballala II. Kulothunga Chola III set off for 'Kongu to check the growth of Hoysala power in that quarter. He fought successfully against Veera Ballala II in 1187–88, re-established Chola suzerainty over Adigaman chiefs of Tagadur, defeated a Chera ruler in battle and performed a virabhisheka in Karuvur in 1193. His relations with Hoysala Veera Ballala II seem to have become friendly afterwards, for Ballala married a Chola princess'. Kulothunga Chola III's successful diplomacy with the Hoysalas would stand him in good stead in periods of difficulty during the last part of his rule, by which time the Pandyan empire grew into the paramount power in both South India and Deccan

Following his successful campaigns against Pandyans of Madurai, Eelam or Sri Lanka, Cheras of Karur and the kings of Venad, Kulothunga Chola III proudly proclaimed in his inscriptions as the conqueror of these regions and the 'crowned head of the Pandya'. Thus, in terms of military achievements, Kulothunga Chola III rivalled his predecessors. Also, his rule, which was the third longest among the Chola emperors, being for 40 years after Parantaka Chola I (52 years), Kulothunga Chola I (50 years) was for the most part (1178–1215) peaceful, stable and prosperous as borne out in his numerous inscriptions found in Tamil, Telugu and Kannada countries.

=== Wars in the Telugu country (1187–1208 CE) ===
In Vengi, about the end of the reign of Rajaraja Chola II, the Velanadu or Velanati Cholas had declared their independence. They were followed by the Nellore branch of the Telugu Chodas which began with Beta, a feudatory of Vikrama Chola. The Velanati and Nellore Chodas had strongly aligned with Vikrama Chola in his war with the Western Chalukya ruler Someshvara III in 1125–1126, which led to the recovery of Vengi after its short occupation by the Western Chalukyas under Vikramaditya VI in 1118–1119. The successor of Rajaraja Chola II, Rajadhiraja Chola II had very little control over Nellore and Northern Circar areas in Telugu country.

However, Kulothunga Chola III, after his accession in 1178 immediately focussed on recovery of Vengi by reigning in the Velanadu and Nellore Chodas and bringing them back into the Chola fold. The exact years and details of Kulothunga Chola III's campaigns in Nellore against the Nellore Chodas, followed by the war against the Velanadu Chodas are not available. 'But', what is clear is that 'there was a recovery under Kulothunga Chola III, whose sway was acknowledged by the Telugu Choda rulers Nallasiddha, and his brother Tammu Siddha, from 1187 to the end of Kulothunga Chola III's reign. There was, however, an interlude during which Nallasiddha occupied Kanchi in 1192–93'. This was the time between 1187–88 to 1191–92, when Kulothunga Chola III was waging wars against Hoysala Veera Ballala II in the Kongu and Kannada countries, against the Cheras of Venad, twice against the Pandyas, who were also aided by the king of Eelam or Ceylon. Being away to the west and south of the Chola country, the hold of Kulothunga Chola III over Kanchipuram, immediately after subduing the Nellore Chodas, was perhaps, not as strong. He also could not turn attention towards the occupation of Kanchipuram by Nallasiddha, the Nellore Choda ruler as 'Kulothunga Chola III first had to wind up his campaigns against the Hoysalas, the two wars against the Pandyas and Cheras of Venad, all of which, owing to his valour, leadership and war skills ended successfully', and hence, could not immediately lead an expedition against the Nellore Choda ruler Nallasiddha. However, Kulothunga III met with equally successful results against the Nellore Chodas, as he did in his wars against the Hoysalas, Pandyas aided by the kings of Eelam, and the Cheras in his previous war campaigns, even though there indeed was an interlude of 18 to 20 months between 1193–1195 CE. In 1195 CE Kulothunga Chola III invaded the areas controlled by Nallasiddha Choda and his feudatories, both in the Telugu country, ostensibly with an eye on his subsequent campaign to recover Vengi from the Velanadu Chodas, and 'in Kanchipuram'. The twin attacks on the Telugu Choda positions were a complete success and ultimately Nallasiddha Choda 'was driven out of Kanchipuram by Kulothunga Chola III in 1196'.

Apparently, there was peace for nearly ten years from 1196 CE, following the quelling in war by Kulothunga Chola III of his rivals and feudatories like Hoysalas, Pandyas, Cheras of Venad, and finally the Telugu Chodas. The Telugu Chodas were to acknowledge suzerainty of the Cholas up to 1216–18 CE. This interlude allowed Kulothunga Chola III to consolidate on his war gains and concentrate on administration and development work in the Chola territories. He had also by this time initiated construction work on the famous Sarabeswarar temple at Tribhuvanam, near Kumbakonam in Thanjavur district.

In his inscriptions, Kulothunga Chola III also lists Vengi across the Northern Circars, which is the area comprising modern Prakasham, the West Godavari and East Godavari districts of Andhra Pradesh. 'Kulothunga Chola III waged war once again in the north in 1208 CE when he claims to have subdued Vengi'. Further, Kulothunga Chola III also claims to have 'entered' Warangal, capital of the Kakatiya kingdom, which 'was ruled at the time by the powerful monarch Ganapati'. This is a pointer to the fact that Kulothunga Chola III did venture northwards to Vengi and on the way back there was a skirmish with the Kakatiya forces, which did not lead to any territorial loss to the Cholas. In any case, there is no inscriptional or epigraphical evidence left by the Kakatiyas claiming to have subdued the Cholas under Kulothunga Chola III.

=== Loss to the Pandyas (1216–1217 CE) and decline of the Cholas (1217–1280 CE) ===
In the war against the Jatavarman Kulasekhara in 1205, Kulothunga Chola III had demolished the coronation hall of the Pandyas at Madurai, although he followed up his action by restoring the defeated Pandya ruler back to the throne. However, as the future events proved, 'the success of Kulothunga Chola III was by no means complete and the seed was thrown for a war of revenge'. Besides, the other wars waged before and after his Pandya invasions had also drained both the aging Kulothunga Chola III physically, and also his treasury. After the first expedition against the Pandyas between it was mainly between 1192–1205 CE that Kulothunga Chola III had to undertake his expeditions against the Hoysalas, Nellore Chodas in Kanchi, Velanadu Chodas at Vengi, followed by a skirmish with the Kakatiyas between Rajahmundry and Visaiyavadai (modern Vijayawada), followed by his third victorious expedition against the Pandyas in 1205 against Jatavarman Kulasekhara Pandyan. In 1208 CE, Kulothunga Chola III again led an expedition, this time against the Velanadu Chodas. As a consequence, there was overall peace in the Chola dominions, between 1208–1215 CE, after the recovery of Vengi from the Velanadu Chodas. During this period, Kulothunga Chola III concentrated on some developmental activities in his country, including construction, repair and restoration activities in temples and other religious places. He was reassured mainly because his enemies and feudatories had been brought under control and their loyalty had been secured. There was no rebellion from the Pandyas, intrusions from the Nellore or Velanadu Chodas had stopped and the kingdoms of Eelam(Ceylon) and Chera also had been subdued.

Kulothunga Chola III apparently failed to notice that the Pandya princes, who always administered their territory by dividing it among themselves, were more or less united at most times, though they did not have the military strength to overwhelm and overcome the Cholas in war. This was also due to the Pandyas also not having a strong leadership who could mobilize his resources and forces so as to carve out a niche or distinct identity as a powerful kingdom in South India. However, it appears there was a change in approach of the, Cholas, who from the times of Kulothunga Chola I, adopted a policy of letting the defeated kings to rule without there being a Chola representative to administer those provinces despite subjugating the Pandyas and Cheras in South India. This policy reversed the practice followed mainly from the times of Raja Raja Chola I and his son Rajendra Chola I who, after defeating the Pandyas and conquering Madurai, sent a Chola prince to directly rule the Pandya country with the royal titles Chola-Pandyan. 'After the conquest of the Pandya country by Kulothunga Chola I, the princes of the local royal family were allowed to rule as they liked, subject to the vague suzerainty of the Cholas'. An important reason for this was the involvement of the Chola kings in the periodic but many a times fierce succession disputes that arose among the Pandya princes leading 'to the intervention of the Chola and Sinhalese rulers on opposite sides, which brought no good to either' kingdom. One such prominent war in the Pandyan country took place 'soon after the installation of Rajadhiraja Chola II (1163–1178 CE)', and 'out of the ashes of this civil war arose the Pandya power which in its renewed strength soon swallowed both the Chola and Ceylonese kingdoms'.

Some political setbacks although not in terms of loss of territory in wars, adversely affected the Cholas during the reign of Kulothunga Chola III itself. While he recovered Vengi with ease in 1208 CE from the Velanadu Chodas, their power in any case had disappeared after 1186 CE and their territories had been divided among five chieftains. Ultimately Ganapatideva, the powerful Kakatiya monarch, had made their country subordinate to his rule by 1214 CE. The subsequent defeat of the Telugu Cholas by the Kakatiya Ganapatideva in 1216 also immensely handicapped Kulothunga Chola III, for the services of his erstwhile subordinates and feudatories were no longer available to him.

As a consequence, 'towards the close of reign, the Pandya reprisal overwhelmed him' and heralded the decline of the Cholas which continued till the demise of the Chola empire in 1280 CE. In 1216 CE, 'Jatavarman Kulasekhara, whom Kulothunga Chola III had humiliated in a signal manner in 1205, was followed on the throne, more than ten years later, by his younger brother, Maravarman Sundara Pandya, who wanted to avenge the wrongs he had shared with brother and invaded the Chola country soon after his accession'. Kulothunga Chola III, having ruled for almost 40 years, was aging and did not have the support of his erstwhile feudatories and subordinates at this time.

The zeal and determination of Maravarman Sundara Pandya under whom the Pandyas would gradually but firmly revive and become the paramount power in South India under his capable successors, and 'the swiftness of the attack rendered Chola resistance feeble'. In the absence of any allies to support him against the Pandyas, Kulothunga Chola III had the ignominy of seeing Thanjavur and Uraiyur being sacked by the forces of Maravarman Sundara Pandya. Kulothunga Chola III and his son, yuvaraja Rajaraja Chola III were driven into exile.

It was now Maravarman Sundara Pandya's turn to repeat the act of Kulothunga Chola III, in performing a virabhishekam in the coronation hall of the Cholas at Ayirattali in Thanjavur district. The Pandya monarch did not stop at this, he marched up to Chidambaram where he worshipped at the famous shrine of Nataraja. On his way back, Maravarman Sundara Pandyan fixed his camp at Pon Amaravati in Pudukottai. At this time, Kulothunga Chola III appealed for aid to Hoysala Veera Ballala II, with whom the Chola monarch had marital alliance. Veera Ballala II responded quickly, and 'sent an army under his son Vira Narasimha II to Srirangam. Maravarman Sundara Pandya, therefore, had to make peace with the Cholas and restore the Chola kingdom to Kulothunga Chola III and Rajaraja Chola III, after they made formal submission at Pon Amaravati and acknowledged him as suzerain. This was the beginning of the second empire of the Pandyas though it was not yet quite the end of that of the Cholas. The wheel of fortune had thus, turned a full circle during the last part of Kulothunga III's reign itself, and from being the powerful suzerains of the once-dominated Pandyas, it was the turn of Cholas to remain dominated and subservient to their arch-enemy, during the best part of their remaining existence between 1217 CE to 1280 CE. The period 1217–1280 CE was a period was a period of continuous decline of the Cholas which is also characterized by the steady and constant growth of the renewed power of the Pandyas. Kulothunga Chola III and his son Rajaraja Chola III became tribute-paying subordinates of Maravarman Sundara Pandya. The aging Kulothunga Chola III did not live long after sustaining defeat against the Pandyas and died in 1218 CE. He was succeeded by his son and heir-apparent Rajaraja Chola III (1218–1256 CE).

== Administration and architecture ==
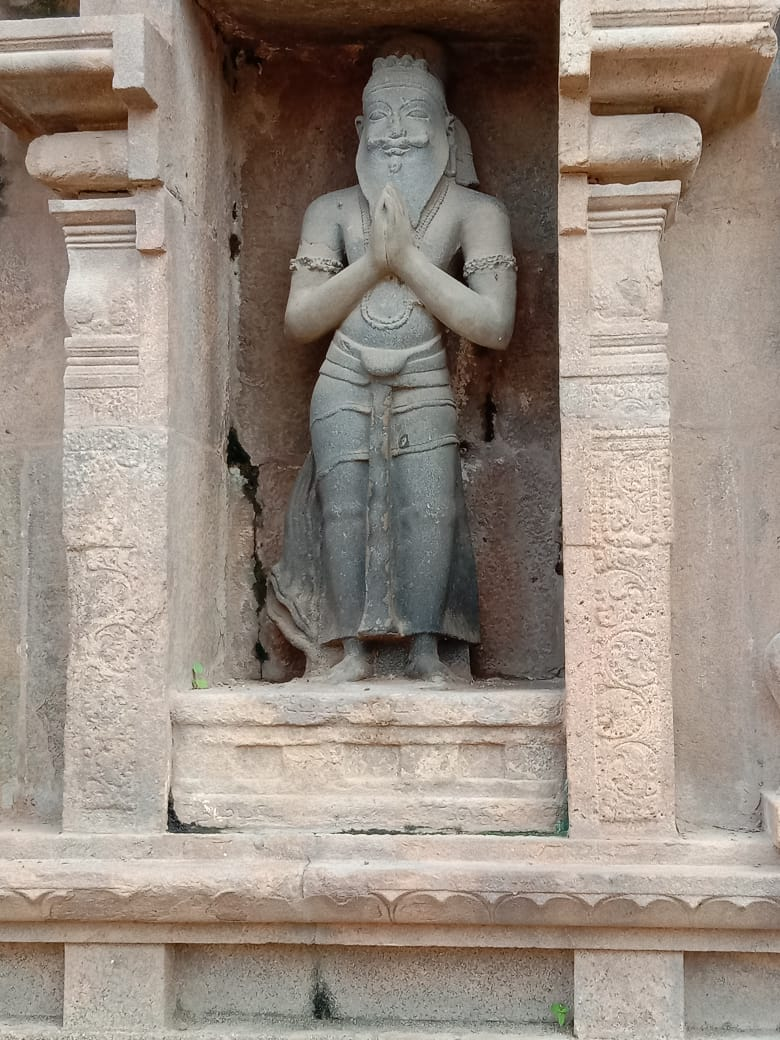
Iswara sivar guru of Kulothunga III

Kulothunga Chola III was a great builder and his reign is a noteworthy period in Chola architecture. Among many well known constructions, He initiated commissioned the Sarabeswara or Kampahareswara temple at Tribhuvanam near Kumbakonam which is considered a great specimen of Dravidian Architecture. Its general design resembles the Brihadisvara Temple in Thanjavur, but the temple of Sarabeswara still has several significant features that distinguish it from their earlier models i.e. the Brihadisvara Temples at both Thanjavur and Gangaikonda Cholapuram. The temple also contains an excellent series of Ramayana reliefs on its walls and was consecrated by Kulothunga Chola III's spiritual guru, Isvarasiva. Besides this temple, Kulothunga also contributed to the extension and renovation of many temples around his kingdom. He also constructed a large number of public buildings, most of which were religious structures, which are enumerated in his inscriptions found at Pudukkottai, Tamil Nadu and in another Sanskrit inscription engraved around the central shrine of Kampahareswara Temple at Tirubhuvanam on the outskirts of Kumbakonam in Thanjavur District, Tamil Nadu. This temple is also called the Tribhuvanavireswara temple in his inscriptions.

Kulothunga Chola III also erected the mukha-mandapa of Sabhapati, the gopura of Goddess Girindraja (Sivakami) and the verandah around the enclosure (prakara harmya) in the Siva Temple of Chidambaram. He also improved and expanded the great Shiva temples at Tiruvidaimarudur, Thiruvarur, Ekambareswarar Temple at Kanchipuram and the Halahalasya Temple at Madurai. In addition, the Rajarajeswara (Airavateswara temple) at Darasuram received Kulothunga Chola III's devoted attention. At the Shiva temple at Thiruvarur, Kulothunga Chola III built the sabha mandapam and the big gopura of the shrine of Valmikeswara.

Kulothunga Chola III was keenly aware of the secular religious traditions of the Chola monarchy. Contrary to popular impression, the Chola kings, despite constructing some of the largest temples for Siva, nonetheless considered the Nataraja temple of Chidambaram, called Periya Koil or "big temple" in Saivite parlance as well as the Sri Ranganathaswami Temple of Srirangam, also called Periya Koil or simply "big temple" in Vaishnavite parlance as their "Kuladhanams" or tutelary deities which attests their secular outlook in religious matters. Such a declaration was made for the first time in the inscriptions of the second Chola emperor Aditya I, which was also repeated by his son Parantaka Chola I and this was also repeated by Kulothunga Chola III (in his inscription No. 133) at the Sri Ranganathaswami Temple at Srirangam. "Siddhanta Ratnakara", a theological treatise, was written and composed by Shri Srikantha Sambhu, father of Isvarasiva, the spiritual guide of Kulothunga Chola III during the reign of this monarch.

In the 23rd and 24th years of Kulothunga's reign there was a widespread famine in the Chola kingdom. Kulothunga organised relief by ordering construction of tanks and river embankments. Kulothunga died some time in 1218 and Rajaraja Chola III became the Chola king.

== Inscriptions ==
The inscriptions of Kulottunga III mostly begin with the introduction Puyal vaayttu valam peruga. His achievements are mentioned incrementally, viz., he claims to have taken Madurai and the crowned head of Pandya are found as early as the 4th year, to this Ilam (Sri Lanka) is added in the 10th year and then followed by Karuvur in the 16th year. He also had the alias Tribhuvanaviradeva and bore the title Tribhuvanachakravarthi. An inscription from the Mahalingswami temple in Tiruvidaimarudur dated in the 28th year of the king's reign refers to the 16th year of his predecessor Sungadavirtha Kulottunga Chola I. Among the places mentioned is Vikramasolanallur in Tiruvalundur nadu a sub-division of Jayangondachola valanadu. The king and his namesake, Kulottunga I are both mentioned together in an inscription of their successor Rajaraja III. An inscription from Govindaputtur dated in the sixteenth year of Kulottunga III mentions that as per a sanction accorded in the seventh year of Periyadevar Rajadhiraja Chola II a garden of areca-palms was made a devadana(gift) to the temple. Further it states that an inquiry was held in regards to the management of this gift.

Preceded by Rajadhiraja Chola II	Chola; 1178–1218 CE	Succeeded by Rajaraja Chola III
