= Vanniyar River =

River in India

The Vanniyar is a river that rises in the Shevaroy Hills in the Salem district in India, flows through the Dharmapuri district and then into the South Pennar River in the Krishnagiri district. This river is also considered a sacred river as it is a tributary of river Krishna Bhadra also known as South Pennar.

== See also ==
- List of rivers of Tamil Nadu
