= Penneswaraar Temple =

Hindu temple in Tamil Nadu, India

Penneshvarar Temple
- Location in Tamil Nadu, India Penneswaraar Temple (Tamil Nadu)

Religion
- Affiliation: Hinduism
- District: Krishnagiri District
- Deity: Shiva

Location
- Location: Krishnagiri
- State: Tamil Nadu
- Country: India
- Interactive map of Penneshvarar Temple
- Coordinates: 12°23′36″N 78°14′45″E

Architecture
- Style: Chola architecture
- Creator: Kulothunga Chola III
- Completed: 1188 AD
- Inscriptions: Tamil

Penneshvarar Temple, also known as Penneshvaramadam Shiva Temple, is a Hindu temple of Shiva in the Krishnagiri district in Tamilnadu. It was built by Kulothunga Chola III in the year 1188 CE in the 12th Century CE, after defeating the Hoysala dynasty of present-day Karnataka region. It is located in Penneshvaramadam, Kaveripattinam Town near Talihalli, Krishnagiri District. The temple is straight next to Thenpennai River which flows from Nandi Hills. This Temple exists as the origin for Bharadvaja Gotra, an ethnic group of Brahmanas in Tamil Nadu who are royal descendants of later Pallavas (Pallava dynasty) had capital as present day Kanchipuram on Palar River in Tamilnadu. They got migrated to western part of Tamilnadu (Kongu Nadu) and towards some parts of Karnataka. The Temple has the highest number of sculptures of Navakandam within the state of Tamil Nadu.

The 7-tiered Rajagopuram, which is the largest in the Krishnagiri District of Tamilnadu, is told to be built by the Athiyaman. The temple has the inscriptions regarding the port of Chennai (Chennapattinam), as well as information regarding digging canal in Chennapattinam during the time of Kampanna II. It has the statue of Kulothunga Chola III as a proof and tribute to the constructor of the temple. It is Parashurama who prays to Shiva in Penneshvaramadam after killing evil Kshatriyas 21 times.

== History ==
The Temple has various inscriptions of different periods by different kings and queens and kingdoms and empires who ruled Krishnagiri district of Tamilnadu. It's been identified that around 42 inscription stones been found and many Navakandam sculptures also found. There is another interesting inscription of Vira Ramanathan the Hoysala dynasty king of 13th century CE, which tells that the person who begs in the jurisdiction of the king will be killed. This also represents that the king was conscious on availability of food for every people in his empire also the fact written in the inscription is that it was written in 41 years of the king Ramanatha. In 12th Century CE, there was a Thevaram Palli (Thevaram School) which still has sites and space remains of the school which is identified through the inscriptions available in the temple. This temple has the inscription which details about the name of the Queen of Raja Raja Chola III as "Vanakovar Ayyar Mahalala Koothadum Devanachiyar" who has lighted a lamp in the temple which also has the special inscription of Cholas has been found in this temple with their symbol, the Chola tiger emblem.

== Nomenclature ==
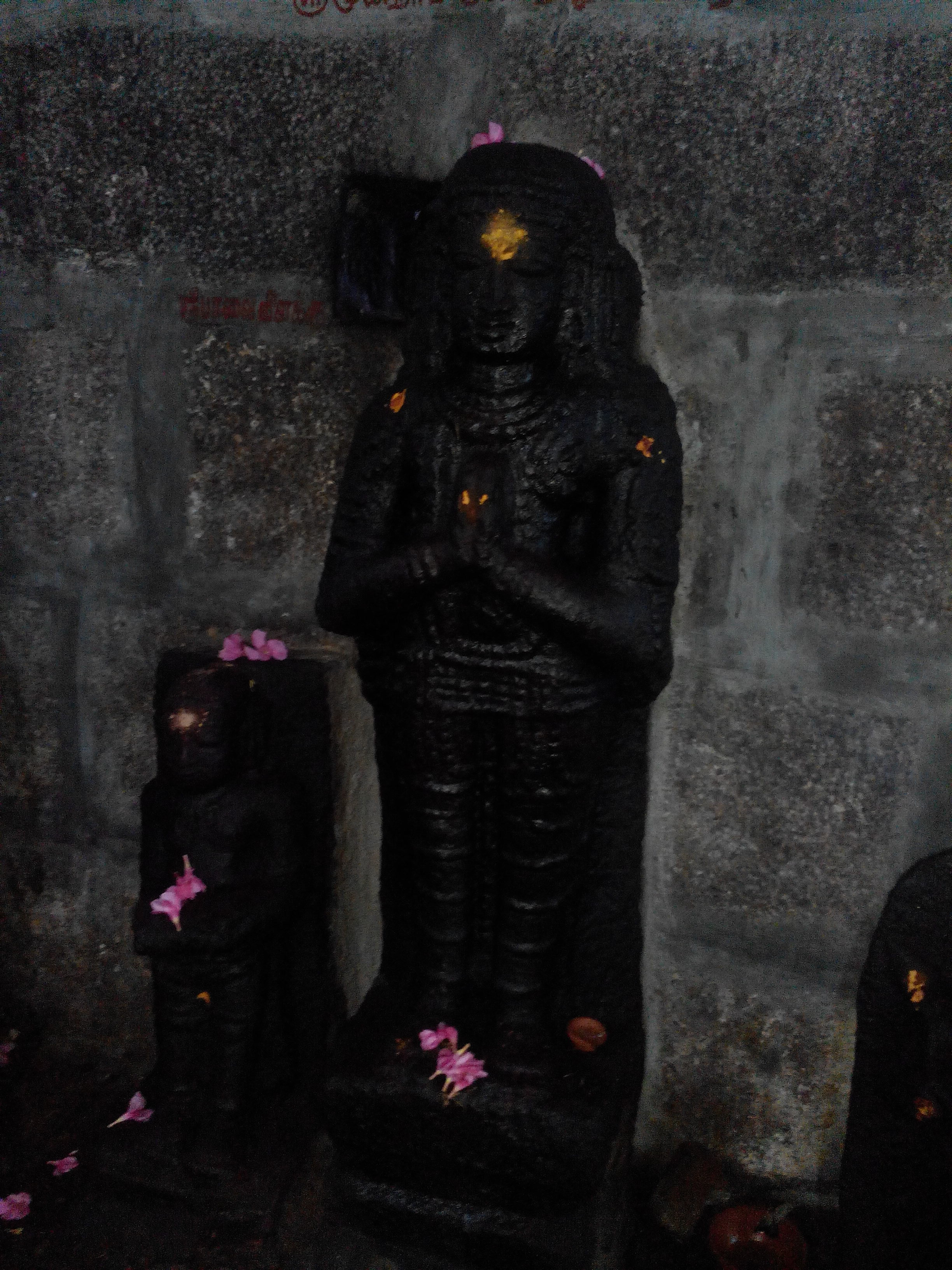
Kulothunga Chola III statue in Penneswaraar Temple.

Kulothunga chola III is believed to be the first person to commission the temple and call it Penneswaraar temple. Later, it became the Penneswaramadam Shiva Temple due to past presence of Cheraman Perumal Madam in 13th century. The 18th century inscription in the temple tells that the mandapam ceiling was by vellapa Nadan Mecheri Kandan Kanda chetty.

== See also ==
- Pallava dynasty
- Bodhidharma
- Bharadvaja
