= Kulothunga II =

Chola emperor from 1133 to 1150

- Rajakesarivarman; Tirunirru Chola
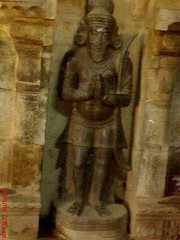
- Sculpture of Kulothunga II at Airavatesvara Temple

Chola Emperor
- Reign: c. 1133 CE – c. 1150 CE
- Predecessor: Vikrama Chola
- Successor: Rajaraja II
- Born: Gangaikonda Cholapuram, Chola Empire (modern day Jayankondam, Tamil Nadu, India)
- Died: 1150 CE; Chidambaram, Chola Empire (modern day Tamil Nadu, India)
- Empress: Tyaagavalli; Mukkokilan
- Issue: Rajaraja Chola II
- House: Chalukya Cholas
- Dynasty: Chola
- Father: Vikrama Chola
- Mother: Mukkōkilānadigal
- Religion: Hinduism

Kulothunga II (died 1150 CE) was a Chola Emperor from 1133 CE to 1150 CE. He succeeded Vikrama Chola to the throne in 1135 CE. Vikrama Chola made Kulothunga his heir apparent and coregent in 1133 CE, so the inscriptions of Kulothunga II count his reign from 1133 CE. According to historians Nilakanta Sastri and T.N Subramanian, Kulottunga Chola II was not the son of Vikrama Chola and they have suggested that there was a break in the line of succession.

== Personal life and family ==
Kulothunga II preferred to live in Chidambaram rather than the royal capital at Gangaikonda Cholapuram. Of the various titles he had, Anapaaya was perhaps his favourite. It is found in his inscriptions as well in the poetic tribute Kulothunga Cholan Ula. He was also called Tirunirruchola.

Kulothunga II was succeeded by Rajaraja Chola II in 1150 CE.

== Extent of Empire ==
Chola territories c. 1150 CE

The extent of empire as inherited from his predecessor Vikrama Chola was well maintained. The Western Chalukya kingdom was overthrown by the Yadava chiefs of Devagiri and Hoysalas of Dwarasamudra during this period. Kulottunga II took advantage of the internal skirmishes and rebellions in the Kannada and Chalukya country to establish his hold over Vengi and Eastern Chalukya territories. Gonka II of the Velanadu Choda family who ruled over northern part of Vengi acknowledged his supremacy. Similarly the Kadapa-Nellore chief, Madurantaka Pottapi Choda, son of Betta I and Buddhavarman III of the Kondavidu branch and his son Mandaya II also acknowledged the king's authority in the Andhra country.

== Patron of Chidambaram ==
Chidambaram is one of those five places where Chola princes were invested with the crown. Kulothunga was a great devotee of the Chidambaram Temple to Lord Shiva in that city, and he celebrated his coronation there. An inscription of the emperor from Tirumanikuli hails this event and states that the emperor celebrated his coronation so as to add lustre to the city of Tillai (Chidambaram).

He also financed an elaborate renovation of the temple as described in the poem Kulothunga Cholan Ula. It is possible that this renovation work was a continuation of work started by Vikrama Chola. Kulottunga II is credited with gilding the Perambalam of the Nataraja Temple, Chidambaram with gold. He is also said to have constructed its gopurams and the Thousand Pillared Hall.

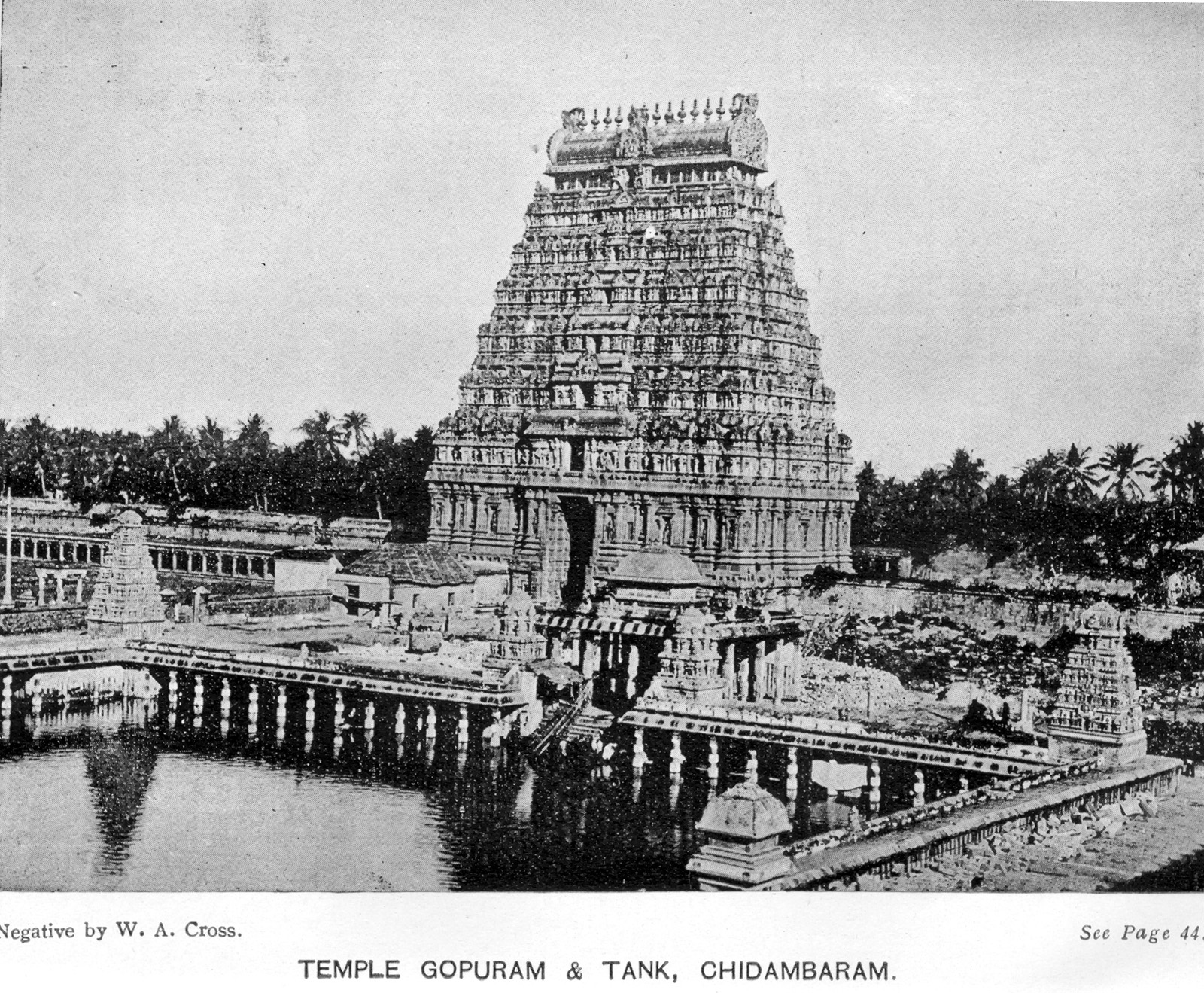
Chidambaram Temple as seen in 1913.

== Literature ==
Kulottunga Chola II's reign was marked by literary activity as evidenced by the works of Sekkizhar and Ottakoothar. Sekkizhar composed the Periyapuranam, a religious treatise on Shaivism during his reign. The Kulottunga Cholan Ula and the Kulottunga Cholan Pillai Tamil, a work dealing with the emperor's childhood were authored by Ottakoothar in honor of the emperor.

== Persecution of Vaishnavas ==
Some scholars identify Kulothunga II with Krimikanta Chola or worm-necked Chola so called as he is said to have suffered from cancer of the throat or neck. The latter finds mention in the Vaishnava Guruparampara and is said to have been a strong opponent of the Vaishnavas. The work Parpannamritam (17th century) refers to the Chola king called Krimikanta who is said to have removed the Govindaraja idol from the Chidambaram Nataraja temple. The Kulothunga Cholan Ula states that during the reign of Kulottunga II, God Vishnu was sent back to his original abode, that is the sea (i.e the Govindaraja idol was thrown into the sea). However, according to "Koil Olugu" (temple records) of the Srirangam temple, Kulottunga Chola was the son of Krimikanta Chola. The former, unlike his father, is said to have been a repentant son who supported Vaishnavism.

== Inscriptions ==
The Tyagarajaswami temple in Tiruvarur contains an inscription of the emperor in which he styles himself as Anapaaya and a bee at the lotus feet of Natesa at Chidambaram. As per the Muchukundasahasranamam, Anapaaya Mahipaala is another name of the deity Thyagaraja of Thiruvarur.

== In popular culture ==
In the film Dasavathaaram (2008), actor Napoleon plays the role of Kulothunga Chola II.

== Notes ==
Preceded by Vikrama Chola	Chola; 1133–1150 CE	Succeeded by Rajaraja Chola II
