= Pambar River (Northern Tamil Nadu) =

River in India

The Pambar River is a tributary of the Thenpennai River in the Krishnagiri and Tirupattur districts of the Indian state of Tamil Nadu.

The Pambar begins as a small stream close to the village of Poongulam in the Vaniyambadi taluk of Tirupattur district. It flows south and slightly west, and its course crosses into Krishnagiri district west of Perampattu. It continues flowing south through Uthangarai taluk, and is joined on its right bank by the Mattur River, its largest tributary. It keeps its southern course until it joins the Thenpennai River on its left bank, south of Uthangarai.
