= Chikka Tirupati =

Hindu temple near Bengaluru, India

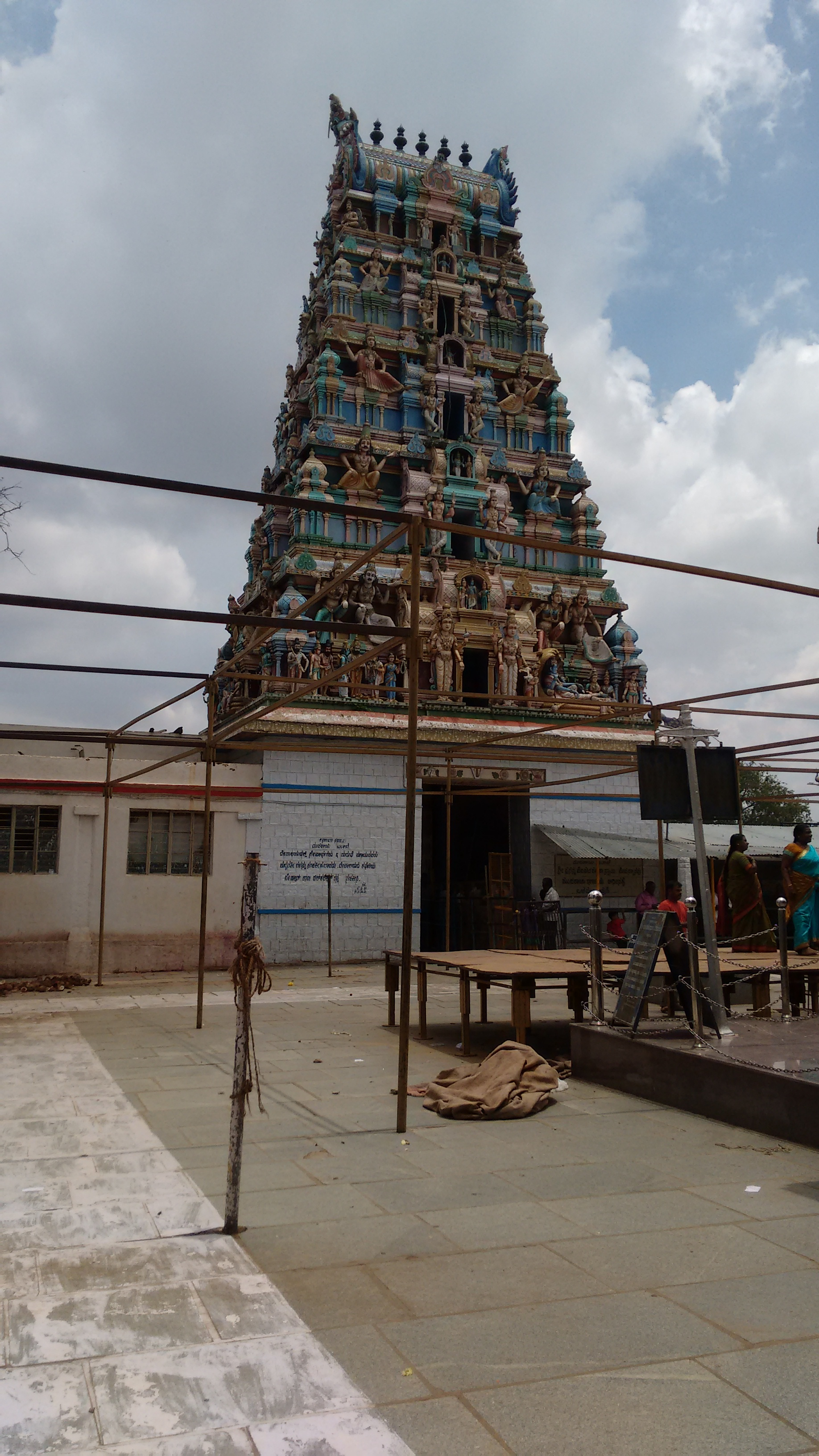
- Image of the gateway tower of the temple

- Location in Karnataka

Religion
- Affiliation: Hinduism
- District: Kolar
- Deity: Venkata Ramana Swamy (Vishnu) Alamelumanga (Lakshmi)
- Features: Temple tank: Right side of the god

Location
- Location: 15 KM from Malur or 12 KM from Sarjapura, Bangalore
- State: Karnataka
- Country: India
- Coordinates: 12°53′44″N 77°51′55″E

Architecture
- Type: Dravidian architecture
- Direction of façade: East Facing

Chikka Tirupati (meaning 'Small Tirupathi' in Kannada, with reference to Tirupathi in Andhra Pradesh) is a Hindu temple dedicated to Venkateshwara, the Hindu god Vishnu. It is located in LAKKUR Hobli of Malur Taluk, in the outskirts of Bengaluru in the South Indian state of Karnataka. Constructed in the Dravidian style of architecture, the temple is considered similar to the Tirupathi Venkateswara temple. Vishnu is worshipped as Venkateshwara and his consort Lakshmi as Alamelumangamma. Chikka Tirupati is 15 km (9.3 mi) from taluk headquarters Malur, 26 km (16 mi) from ITPL and 30 km (19 mi) from Koramangala.

The temple is open from 6.30 am to 7:30 pm (all days of week) and has four daily rituals at various times of the day. The Brahmotsava, the major festival, is celebrated annually during Shravana Shaniwaara during which the festival images of the presiding deities are taken in a procession around the streets of the temple in a chariot. The temple is maintained and administered by Sabha Administration Board.

== Legend ==
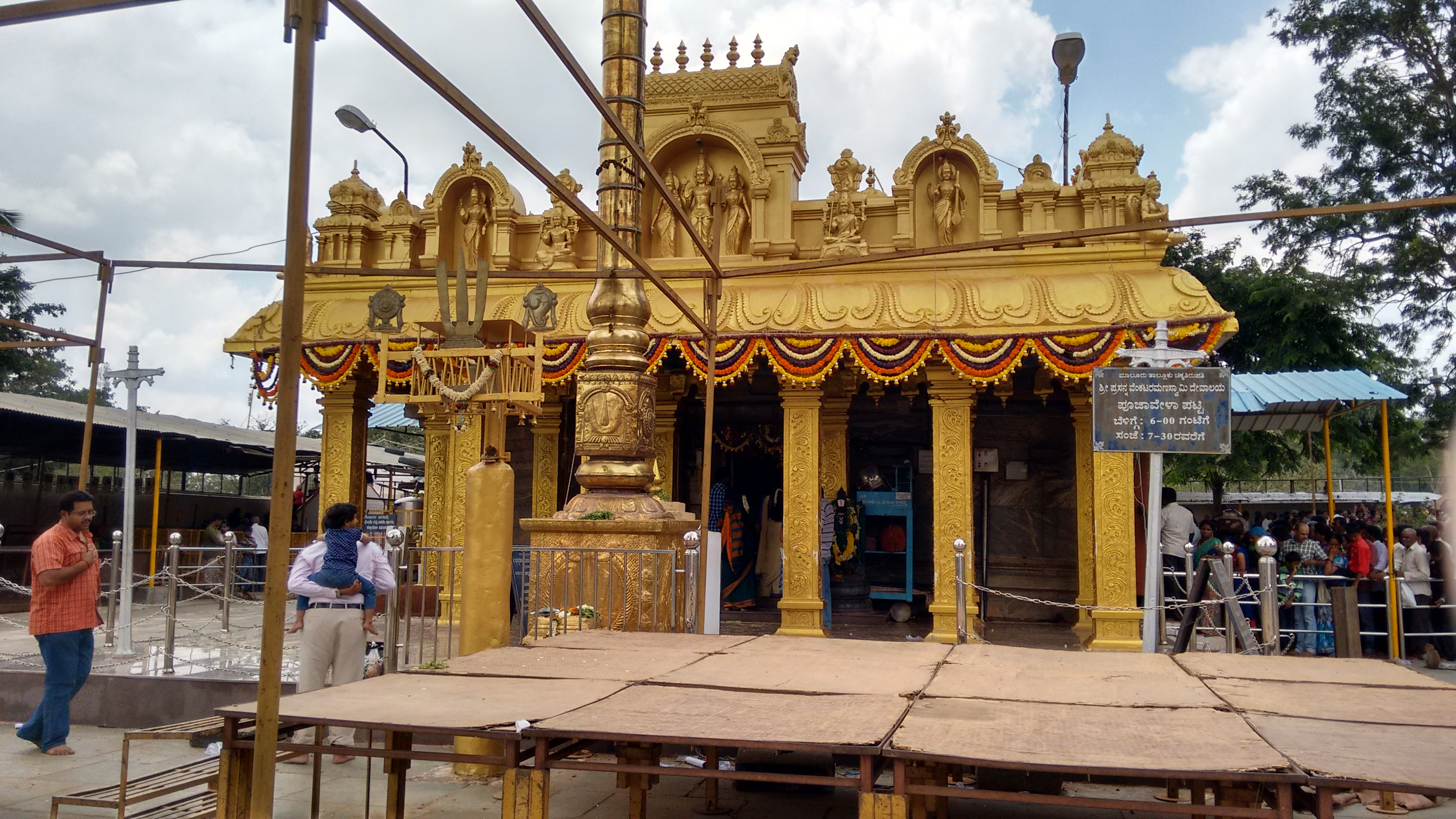
Image of the flagstaff and the second hall leading to the sanctum

The legend of the place relates to the episode of Kandava Dahana in epic Mahabharata. During the Dahana, Takshaka escaped the forest with little injuries and he cursed Agni (the fire god) to lose his divinity. As suggested by Shiva, Agni prayed to Vishnu, here in this region and regained his status. As per another legend, the head of the village had a dream based on which the image of the presiding deity was dug out from a local pond. While carrying it in a bullock cart to the identified place where the temple was to be built, the cart broke in a place which is where the temple was built. As per historical records, the region was ruled by Gangas, Chola and Hoysala dynasties. During the times, the place was called Kanikaranahalli, which went on to become Kanakapura.

== Architecture ==
It is located 25 km away from Hoskote. Venkateswara temple is built in Dravidian architecture and the exact history of the temple is not known. The inscriptions in Mysore records indicate that the temple is a few centuries old. The temple has a 5-tiered gopura. The temple tank is located north of the temple. The central shrine houses the image of Venkateshwara in standing posture. There are two precincts around the temple. From the entrance tower, the central shrine is located in the axis through the Dwajasthamba (flagstaff), pillar of offering and Garuda Mantapa. The image of Garuda, the eagle mount of Venkateshwara, is housed in the Garuda Mantapa, facing the image of the presiding deity. The temple in modern times is administered by the Department of Religious Endowment, Government of Karnataka.

== Worship practices and festivals ==
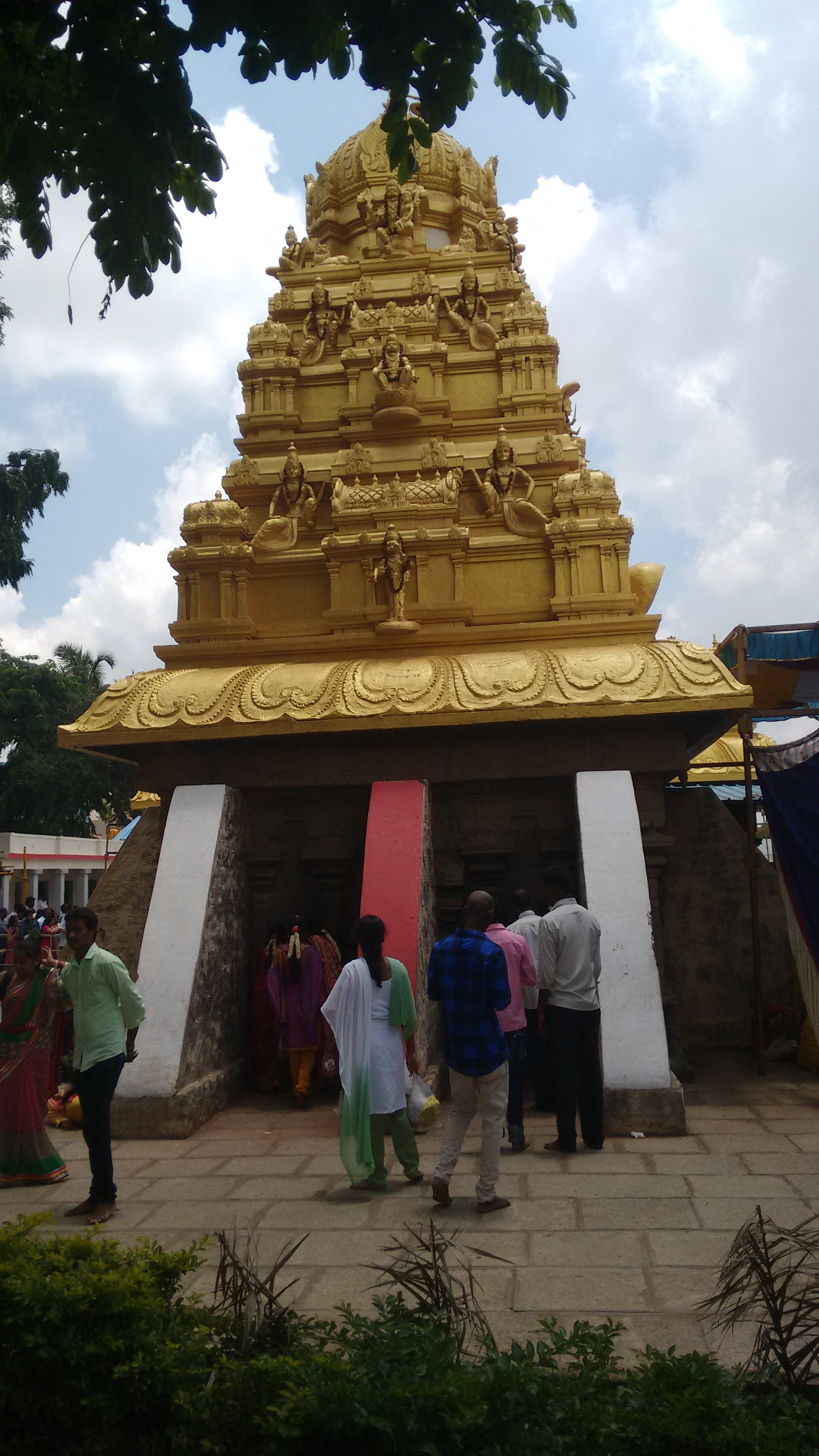
Image of the shrine around the sanctum

The temple is open from 6 a.m. to evening 7:30 p.m. without a break and the temple is open throughout all the 7 days of week. The temple priests perform the pooje (rituals) during festivals and on a daily basis. As at other Vishnu temples in the nearby state Tamil Nadu, the priests belong to the Vaishnavaite community, a Brahmin sub-caste. The temple rituals are performed four times a day: Ushathkalam at 8 a.m., Kalasanthi at 10:00 a.m., Sayarakshai at 5:00 p.m. and Ardha Jamam at 7:00 p.m. Each ritual has three steps: alankaara (decoration), neivedhya (food offering) and deepa aradane (waving of lamps) for both Venkateshwara and his consort Alamelumanga. During the worship, religious instructions in the Vedas (sacred text) are recited by priests, and worshippers prostrate themselves in front of the temple mast. There are weekly, monthly and fortnightly rituals performed in the temple.

The temple is considered holy as the Tirupathi Venkateswara temple and devotees from other states like Andhra Pradesh and Tamil Nadu visit the temple. As of November 2012, the temple had an annual revenue of ₹1 crore. The Brahmotsavam, the major festival, is celebrated annually during Shravana Shaniwara during which the festival images of the presiding deities are taken in a parade around the streets of the temple in a chariot. An interesting part of this lord Venkateshwara idol is that it is an Abhayahastha (hand showing upwards as blessing) whereas in Tirupathi at Andhra Pradesh, the presiding deity's hand is showing downwards. The chariot festival has been of historic importance and draws crowd from neighbouring regions. Karaga, also called Mother goddess festival is celebrated in the temple annually. People go on a pilgrimage and as a mode of worship walk 15 to 20 km from various villages to the temple. The devotees are fed by neighbouring villages during the event.
