= Gangaikonda Cholapuram =

Gaṅgaikoṇḍa Chōḻapuram
- Town
- Gaṅgaikoṇda Chōḻapuram
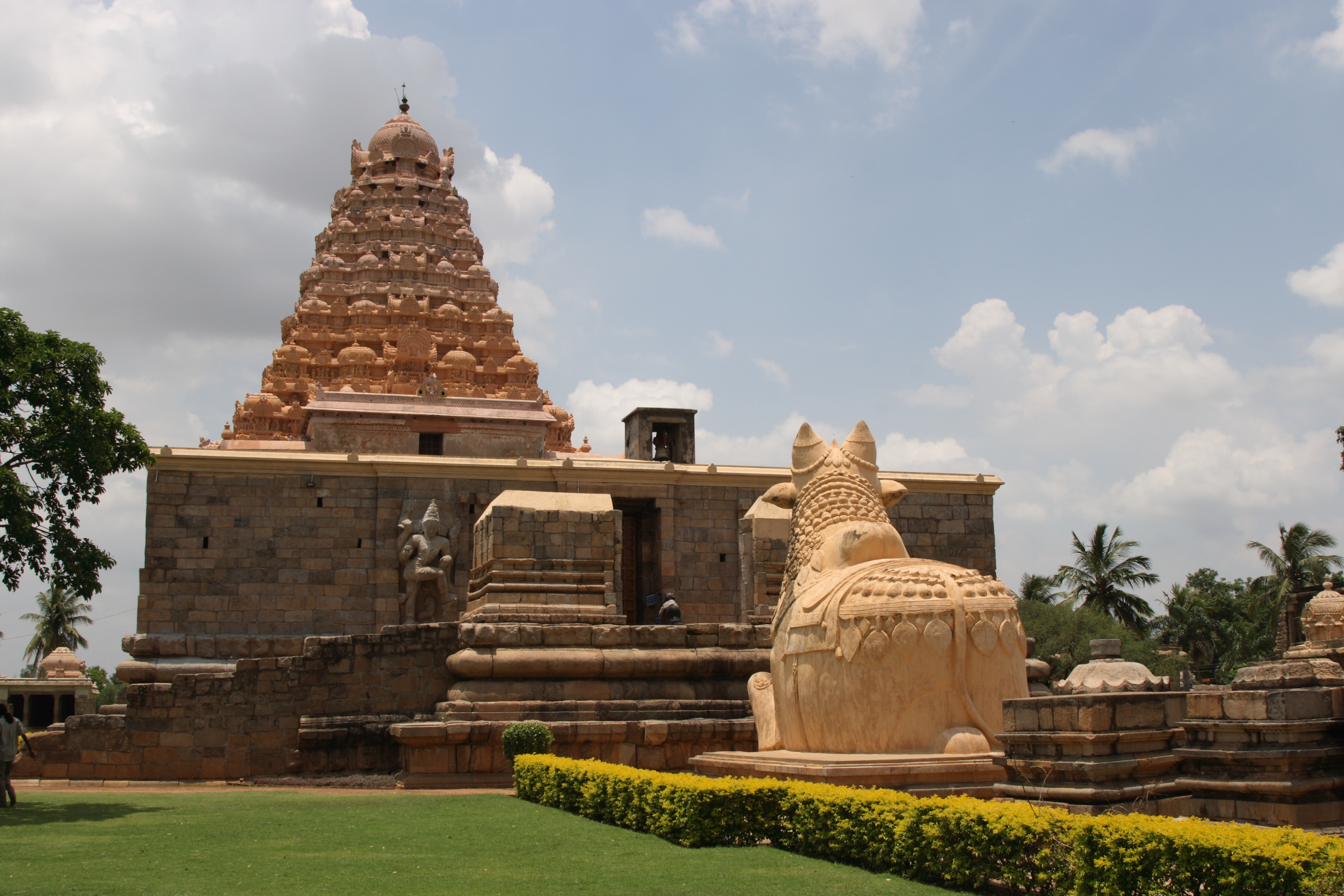
- The Shiva temple in Gangaikonda Cholapuram

- Location within Tamil Nadu
- Coordinates: 11°12′23.2″N 79°26′54″E
- Country: India
- State: Tamil Nadu
- Region: Chola Nadu

Languages
  - Official: Tamil
- Time zone: UTC+5:30 (IST)

Gaṅgaikoṇḍa Chōḻapuram is a village located near Jayankondam in Ariyalur district of Tamil Nadu, India. The Chola emperor Rajendra I established it as the capital of the Chola dynasty in c. 1025, and it remained the capital for approximately 250 years.

The village is situated approximately 125 kilometres (78 mi) northeast of Tiruchirapalli International Airport. The ancient site is designated as a heritage town within the Ariyalur district. The Brihadisvara Temple at Gangaikonda Cholapuram is second in scale only to the Brihadisvara Temple (Peruvudaiyar Kovil) in Thanjavur, while featuring distinct architectural and sculptural details. It is designated as a UNESCO World Heritage Site.

== Etymology ==
The name translates as 'the city of the Chola who took the Ganges', derived from Gangai (River Ganga), konda (obtained), chola (Chol), and puram (city). The name commemorates Rajendra I's victory, and his expedition to bring water from the Ganges river to establish his new capital.

== History ==
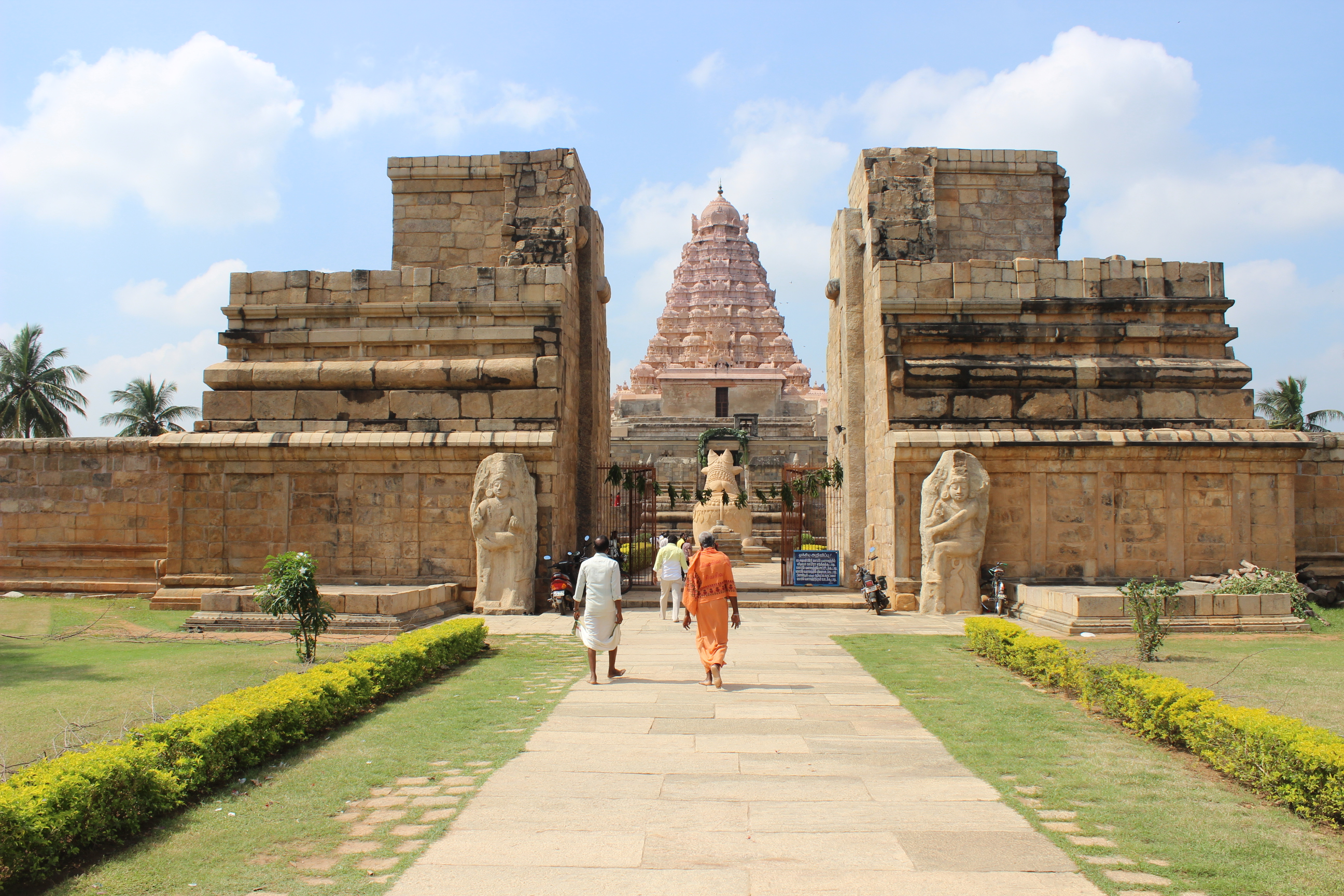
Gangaikonda Cholapuram Temple Entrance

The city was founded by Rajendra I to commemorate his victory over the Pala dynasty. Today, it is a small village whose historical significance is remembered by the surviving Brihadisvara Temple. At its height, the Chola empire encompassed southern India up to the Tungabhadra River in the north. For administrative and strategic reasons, Rajendra I established his new capital at Gangaikonda Cholapuram.

The city, originally possessed two concentric fortifications—and inner wall and a wider outer wall—the remains of which can be seen as a mound surrounding the palace site.

The Thiruvilandur Copper Plate records,

This great king Rājendra established the city Gangaikonda Cholapuram, the most auspicious spot in the entire earth. He beautified this city with many lofty mansions, on the tops of which beautiful ladies of the houses were dancing in company with the god-ladies (amarāṅganās) joyfully (v. 36).

— Thiruvilandur Copper Plate,

=== Ruins of the ancient city ===
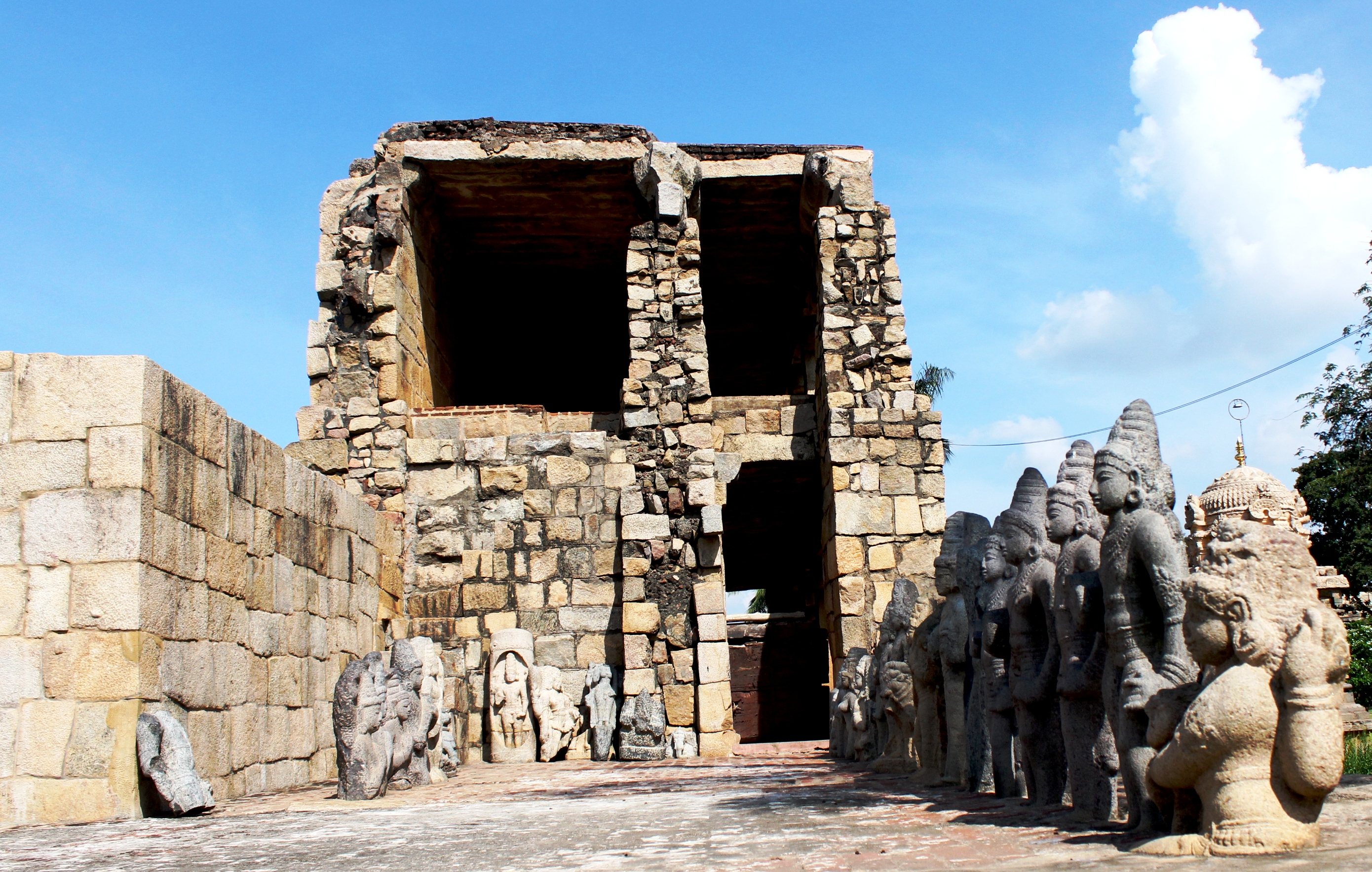
Ruins of the ancient city

Excavations indicate that the outer fortification was constructed on burnt bricks and measured 6 to 8 feet wide, consisting of two parallel brick walls with a sand-filled core. The bricks are relatively large and made of well-burnt clay. The Tamil Nadu State Department of Archaeology conducted excavations at the nearby village of Ayudhakalam, believed to have housed an armory and weapon manufacturing workshops.

=== Construction and destruction ===
The surviving temple at Gangaikonda Cholapuram was completed in 1035 CE. Rajendra I modeled it on the Tanjore temple constructed by his father, Rajaraja I, following a military campaign across northern and eastern India that Chola-era records state covered Karnataka, Andhra Pradesh, Odisha, and Bengal. Following his campaign, he required the defeated kingdoms to send pots of Ganges River water to be poured into the temple's well.

According to Tamil tradition, Rajendra I subsequently assumed the title Gangaikonda Cholan (the Chola who conquered the Ganges). He relocated the Chola capital from Thanjavur to Gangaikonda Cholapuram, which remained the imperial seat for approximately 250 years. Rajendra I laid out the city and its temples according to the architectural principles prescribed in Tamil Vastu and Agama sastra texts. These shrines included temples dedicated to Dharma Sasta, Vishnu and other deities; however, all were destroyed during the late 13th and 14th centuries except the Brihadisvara Temple. Traces of other Chola structures remain visible as soil-covered mounds, excavated pillar stumps, and brick wall remnants extending across several kilometres around the surviving temple.

The exact causes of the city's destruction remain uncertain. According to archaeologist S. Vasanthi, the Pandyas, who defeated the Cholas in the late 13th century, "may have razed the city to the ground" in retaliation for earlier defeats. However, historians note that this theory does not explain why the main temple was spared while nearby shrines were destroyed, nor why approximately 20 inscriptions from later Chola, Pandya and Vijayanagara rulers record grants made to the temple. An alternative theory attributes the destruction to raids by the Delhi Sultanate. Armies led by Malik Kafur (muslim commander) in 1311, Khusrau Khan in 1314, and Muhammad bin Tughlaq in 1327 invaded Chola territory and Madurai. The following decades were marked by conflicts between regional Hindu rulers and the Madurai Sultanate (1335–1378), a part that broke away from the Delhi Sultanate. (Note: Thanjavur was a target of both Muslim and Hindu neighboring kingdoms, both near and far. The Madurai Sultanate was established in the 14th century, after the disastrous invasions and plunder of South India by Ala ud-Din Khalji's armies of Delhi Sultanate led by Malik Kafur. Later Adil Shahi Sultanate, Qutb Shahis, Randaula Khan and others from east and west coasts of South India raided it, and some occupied it for a few years.) The Vijayanagara Empire conquered the Madurai Sultanate in 1378, bringing the region back under Hindu rule and leading to the restoration of many Chola-era temples. The temple was reconsecrated in 2017 following the installation of a dhvajastambha (flagstaff) and performance of the maha kumbhabhishekam ritual.

== Arts and architecture ==
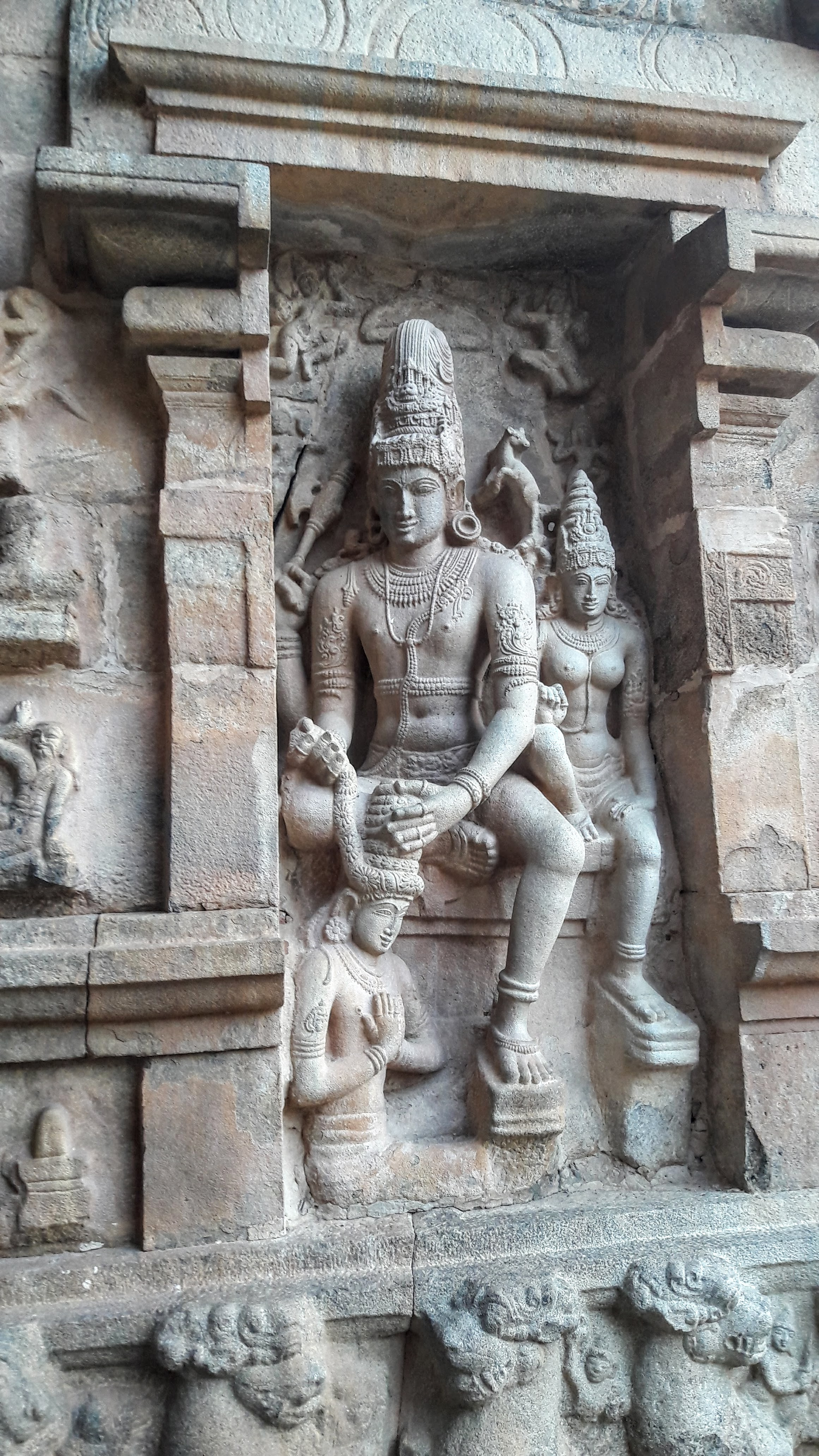
Lord Shiva crowning Rajendra chola

Chola rulers were patrons of the art and architecture. They constructed the Gangaikondacholisvaram temple. The temple sculptures of high artistic quality. Notable among its metalwork are the bronze figures of Bhogasakti and Subrahmanya. The Saurapitha (solar altar), the lotus-shaped altar featuring eight deities, is an important feature of the complex. The main Shiva lingam is carved from a single block of stone.

The Chola emperors constructed enormous stone temple complexes decorated with intricate carvings of Hindu deities. Rajaraja I constructed the Brihadrisvara Temple at Thanjavur—located approximately 50 km from Gangaikonda Cholapuram—between 1003 and 1010 CE. The temple is dedicated to Shiva and remains one of the largest surviving Chola monuments. A huge monolithic statue of Nandi, the sacred bull of Shiva, stands in the central courtyard.

Chola-period bronze sculptures are noted for their detailed craftmanship and expressive posture. Numerous depictions of Nataraja (the dancing form of Shiva) were made during this period.

== Royal Palace ==
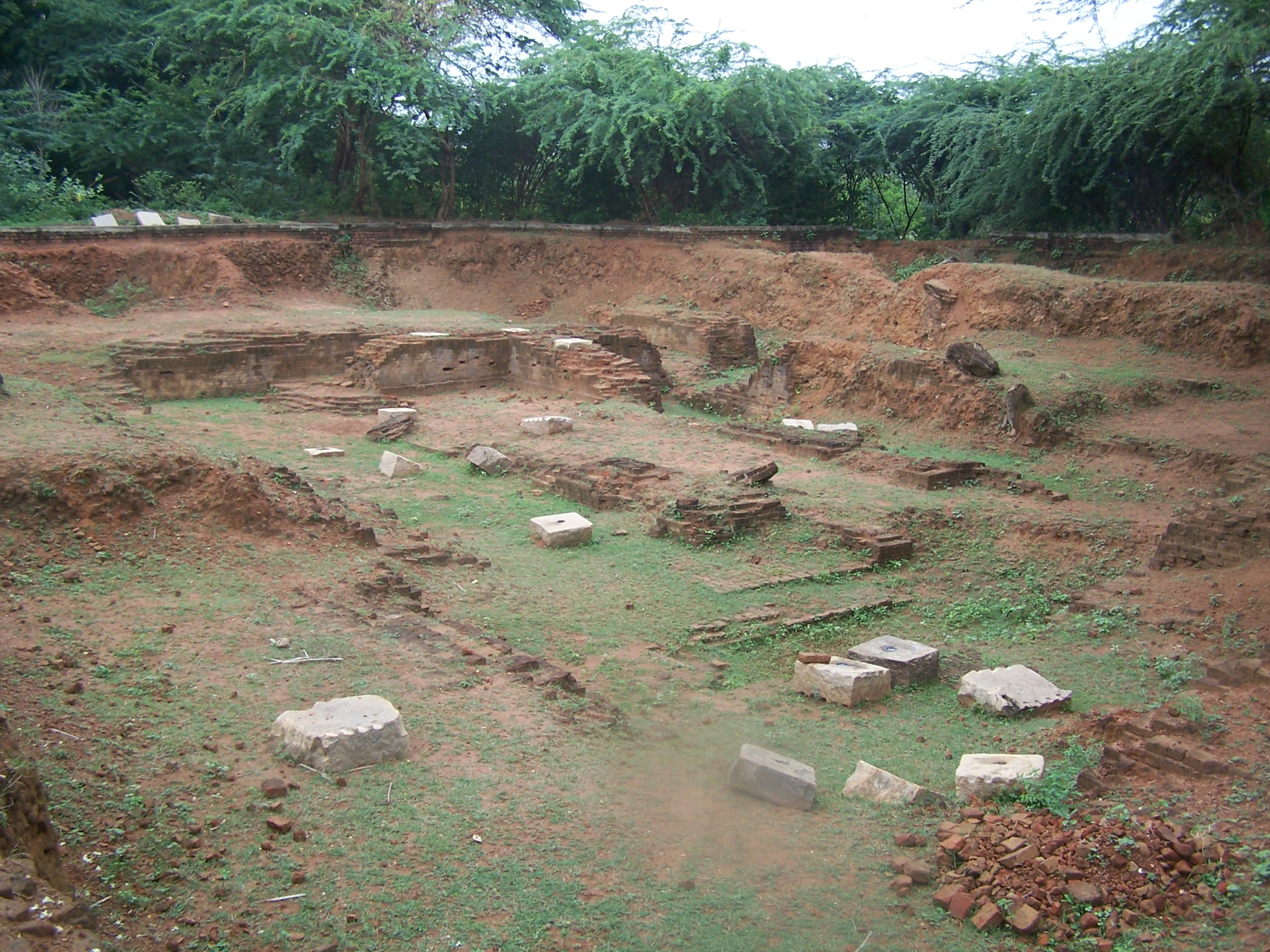
Remains of Royal Palace as of 2005 in Maligaimedu Village

The royal palace was also constructed of burnt bricks. Its ceilings were laid with courses of small, flat tiles set in fine lime mortar. The pillars were likely made of polished wood supported by granite bases, a few of which survive at the site. Excavations at the palace site have recovered Iron nails and clamps. A subterranean passage links the palace to the northern portion of the temple's inner first prakaara (enclosure wall).

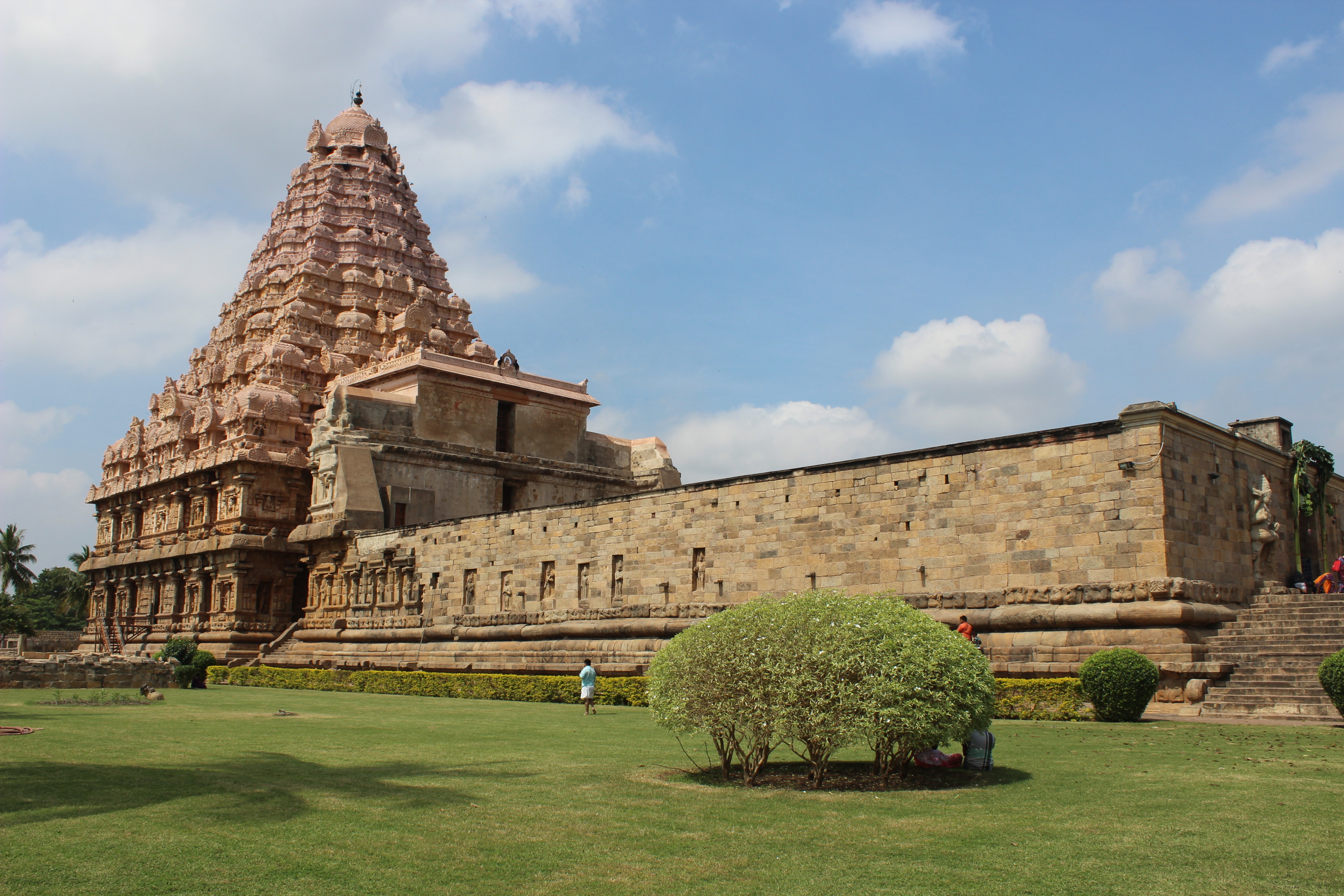
Side View of Gangaikonda Cholapuram Temple.

In inscriptions from the reign of Virarajendra Chola, Rajendra's third son, the palace at Gangaikonda Cholapuram is referred to as Chola-Keralan Thirumaligai (Chola Keralan palace), evidently named after one of Rajendra I's titles. The same inscription identifies structural parts of the complex, including the adibhumi (ground floor), Kilaisopana (eastern portico), and a royal seat named Mavali vanadhirajan. These references indicate that the palace was multi-storied structure. In an inscription dated to the 49^{th} regnal year of Kulothunga I (1119 CE), reference is made to Gangaikondacholamaligai at this site. This suggests that the complex contained more than one royal building, each bearing its own name.

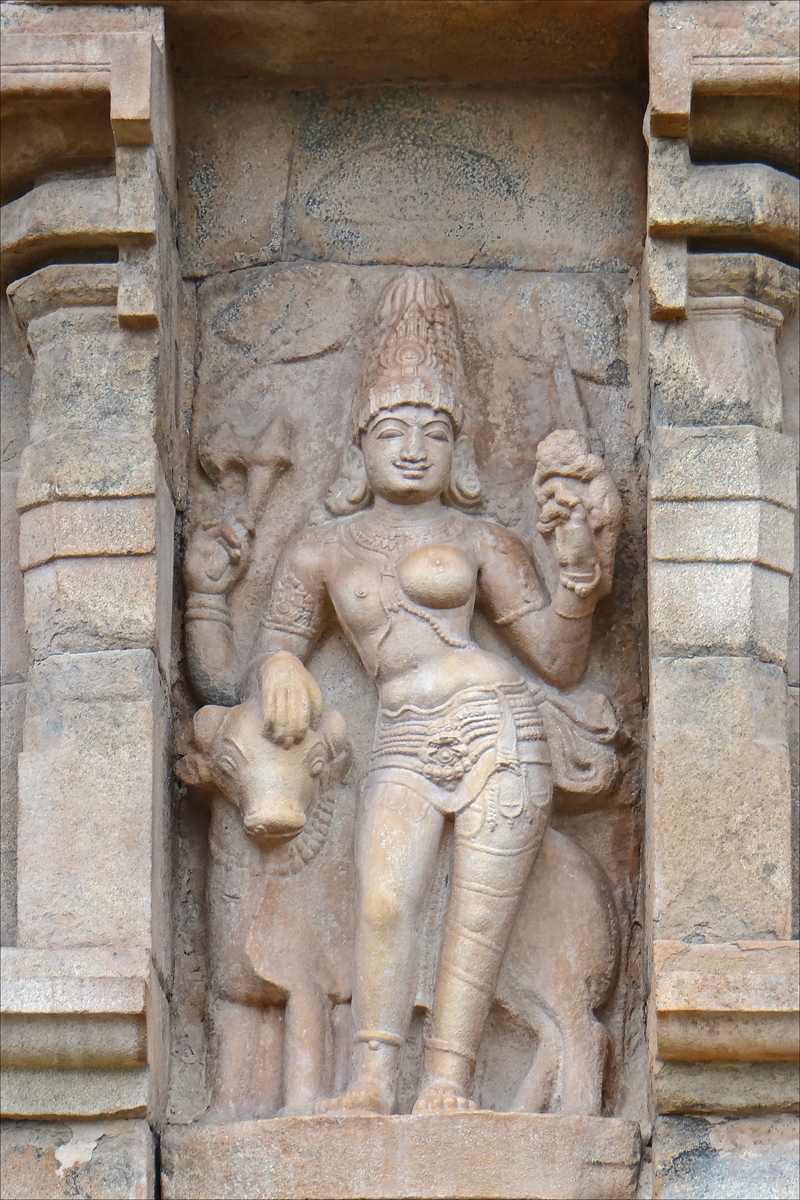
Ardhanarishvara (half Shiva, half Parvati) statue in Gangaikonda Cholapuram Temple

== Roads and City gates ==
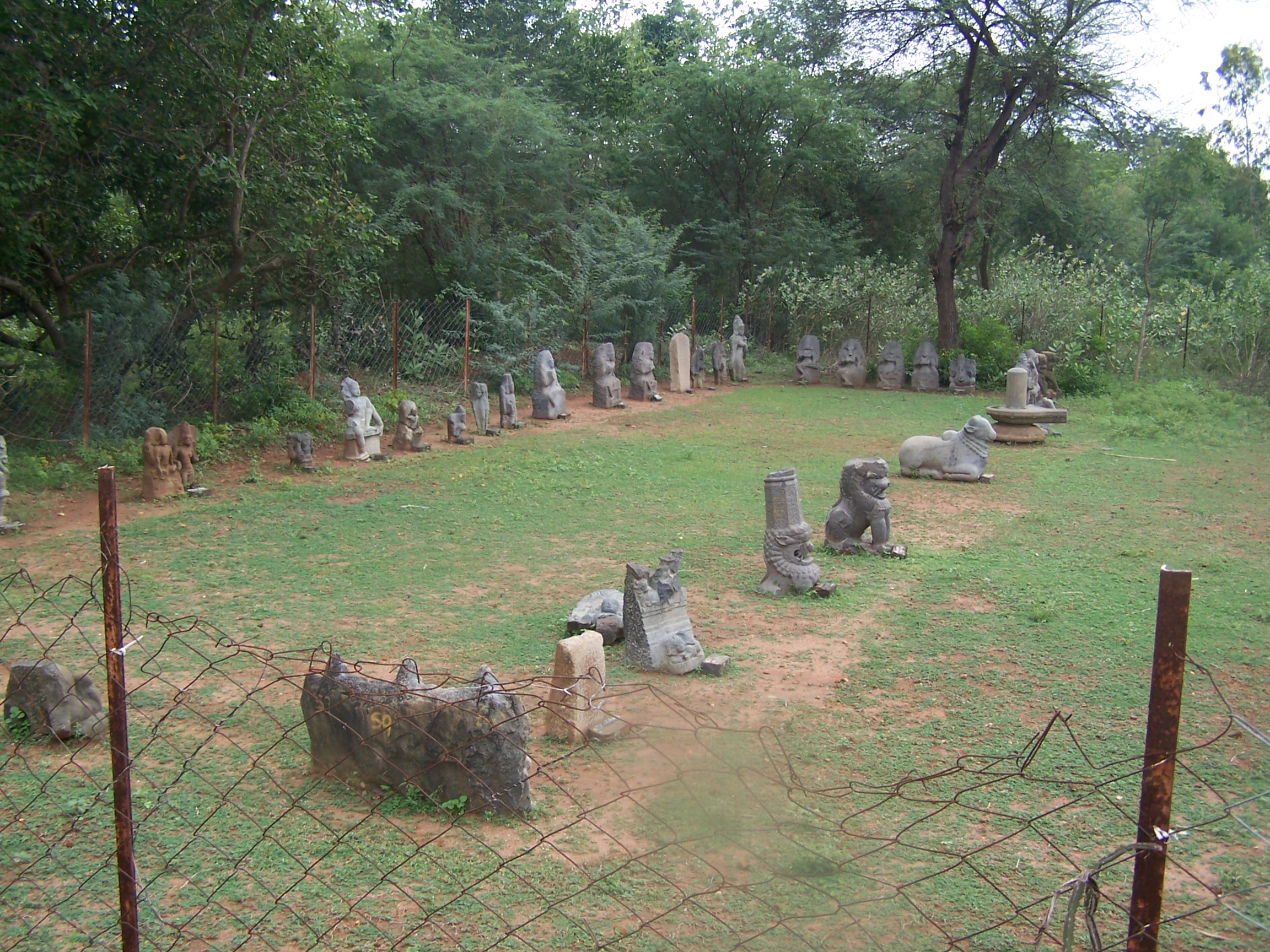
Excavated Ancient Stone Sculptures

In addition to the names of palace and fort walls, the names of several roads and streets are preserved in local inscriptions. Inscriptions mention entryways such as the Thiruvasal (the eastern gate) and the Vembugudi gate, the south entryway leading to the neighboring village of Vembugudi. Records also reference major highways named after Rajaraja I and Rajendra I, including the Rajarajan Peruvali and Rajendran Peruvali. Other streets mentioned include the 'ten streets' (Pattu teru), the gateway lane (Thiruvasal Narasam) and the Suddhamali lane. Inscriptions also list other highways, including the Kulottungacholan Thirumadil peruvali, the Vilangudaiyan Peruvali and the Kulaiyanai pona Peruvali (the highway through which a short elephant passed).

== City layout and irrigation ==
Inscriptions also refer to Madhurantaka Vadavaru (now known simply as the Vadavaru), a channel running approximately 6 km east of the ancient capital. Named after one of Rajendra I's titles, the Madhurantaka Vadavaru provided irrigation for agricultural lands surrounding the capital. Inscriptions also mention an irrigation channel named Anaivettuvan (anai meaning dam or embankment, and vettuvan referring to workers or engineers).

=== Urban planning and sacred geography ===
The fort contained both wet and dry lands utilized for cultivation and civic purposes. The locations of the surviving temples reflect the original layout of the city. The city was planned with the royal palace at its centre, surrounded by the main temple and auxiliary shrines. Situated to the northeast (Isanya) of the palace, the main Shiva temple adheres to traditional Vastu texts, which prescribe placing Shiva shrines in the northeastern corner of a settlement facing east. Similarly, these texts prescribe that Vishnu temples should be located in the western side.

Inscriptions record numerous small tanks, ponds, and wells that supplied drinking water to the residents.

== See also ==
- Suryadeva Yajvan, a 12th-13th century scholar from Gangaikonda Cholapuram
