= Rama Kulasekhara =

11th-century ruler of Kerala, India

- Kulasekhara Perumal • Koyil Adhikarikal • Cheraman Perumal • Cheramanar (Tamil) • Chakravarthikal ("Ma Ko") • Thiruvadi
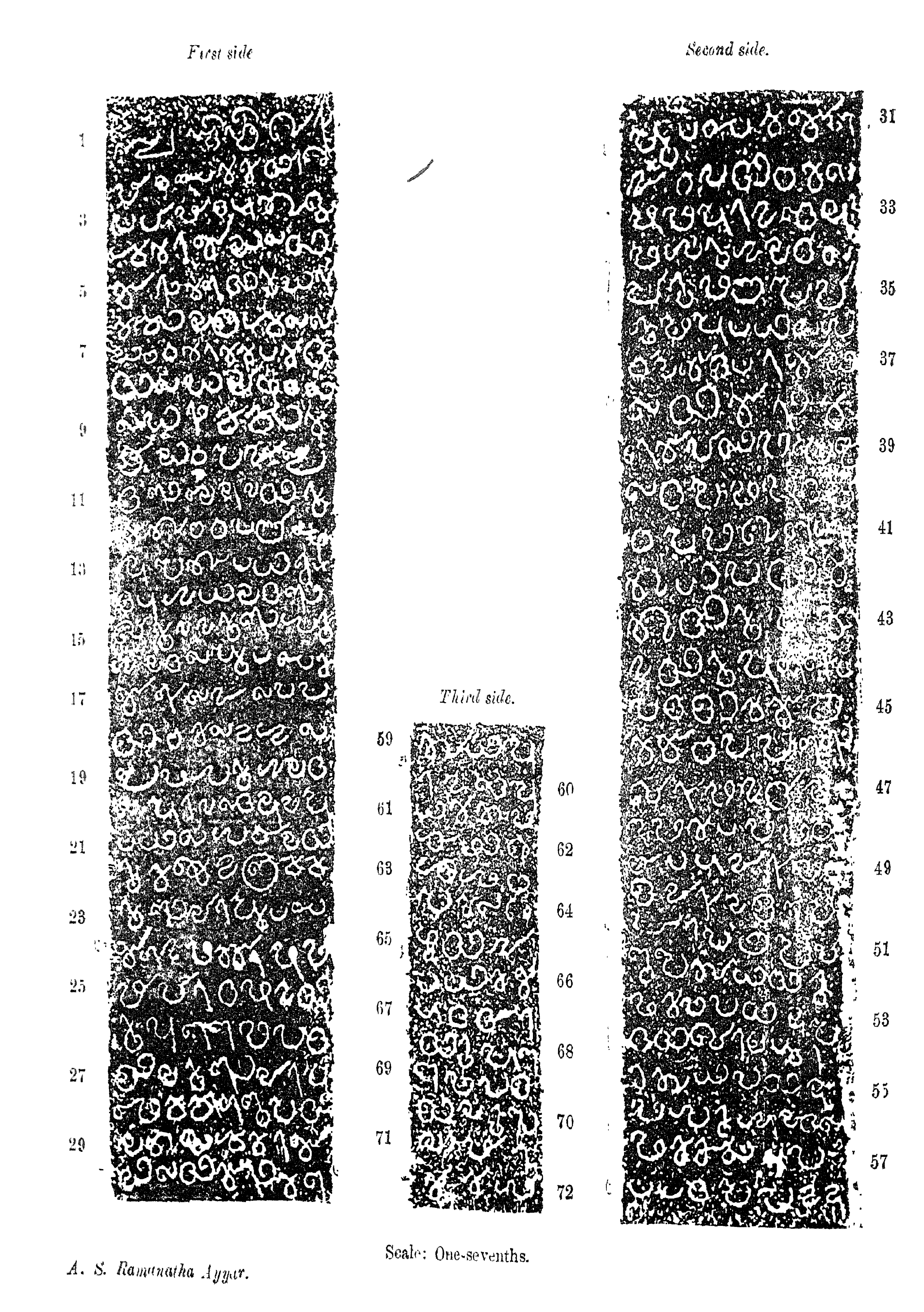
- Perunna temple inscription (1099 AD)

King of Medieval Chera Kingdom
- Reign: 1089/90–c.1122/23 AD
- Predecessor: Adithya Goda "Ranadithya" (c. 1036–1089 CE)
- Successor: None
- Issue: Vira Kerala
- House: Medieval Chera dynasty (Kerala)

Rama Kulasekhara (fl. late 11th century CE) was the last ruler of the medieval Chera dynasty of Kerala. He was a contemporary of the Chola kings Kulottunga I (1070–1120) and Vikrama Chola (1118–35 AD). Rama Kulaskehara is best known for briefly recovering the Kollam-Trivandrum-Nagercoil region from the powerful Chola empire around 1100–1102 AD.

Inscriptions related to Rama Kulasekhara have been found at Panthalayani Kollam near Quilandy, Thiruvaloor (on the Periyar), Perunna near Changanassery, Nedumpuram Thali (Wadakkanchery), and Kollam. The weakened authority of Kulaskehara is evident in some of these inscriptions. In c. 1099 AD, the leader of the Nair warriors in central Kerala is recorded as administering the affairs of the Nedumpuram Thali; a state-sponsored royal temple. In 1102 AD, Kulasekhara is attested in an inscription as having publicly atoned for "wrongs committed" against the Brahmin community—an act that was highly unusual for a reigning Chera ruler (Kollam Rameswaram temple inscription). An inscription of a Chera princess, dated to 1122 AD and found at Thiruvalanchuzhi in Tanjore (dated in the regnal year of Chola ruler Vikrama Chola), also refers to Rama Kulasekhara.

Kollam functioned as the second headquarters of the medieval Chera kingdom during the final phase of Rama Kulasekhara's rule (c. 1100/02 AD – c. 1122/23). According to scholars, "the strategic advantage of marriage relations with the old ruling clan of Kollam in securing the loyalty of Venadu can also be considered in the light of continuous Chola-Pandya attacks in south Kerala". There is also a Kerala tradition that Vira Kerala, a ruler of Kollam in early 12th century, was a son of the last Chera king.

== Career ==
Rama Kulasekhara, according to the Kollam Rameswaram inscription, ascended the medieval Chera throne around c. 1089/90 AD. "Rama" was perhaps his personal name, while "Kulasekhara" ("Head-Ornament of the Race") functioned as his coronation title. The earliest known record of the king, in which he is styled "Kulasekhara–Koyil Adhikarikal", is found in the courtyard of the Panthalayani Kollam Bhagavathi Temple in northern Kerala. Another inscription referring to him as "Kulasekhara Perumal", dated to 1092 CE, is located at the Thiruvaloor temple in the Periyar valley.

=== Kulottunga Chola's Kerala campaign ===
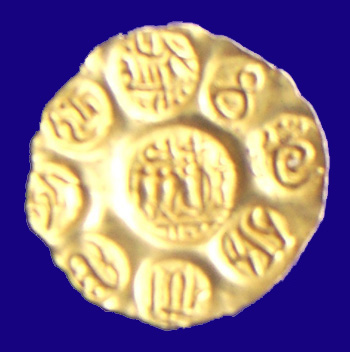
Kulotunga Chola I coin with the legend "Malai Nadu Konda Chola"

Between 1077 and 1081 AD, the Chola ruler Kulottunga I (1070–1120) conducted a campaign that successfully brought the Pandya and Chera countries, which were perhaps allied at the time, back under Chola authority. This campaign involved extensive military activity along the border between the Ay and Pandya countries. The inscriptions describe the conquest of the Pandya country, the southern Western Ghats, and Cape Comorin, while emphasising the demarcation of the boundaries of the Pandya country. They further record that while the "chaver" warriors of Kuda Malai Nadu (here meaning the Malabar Coast) attained their "unique heaven", Kulottunga rewarded his mounted commanders by granting them settlements along every major route, including one at Kottar (Nagercoil), intended to strike terror into his enemies. Another record states that the Cholas subdued the numerous forces of the Keralas and compelled the obedience of rebellious groups of vassal kings.

It appears that Chola forces advanced northwards from the south (Nagercoil) as far as the port of Kollam around 1097 AD. This thrust was probably led by the Chola general "Naralokavira" Kalinga Rayan. A new era, known as "Kollam Azhintha Andu", perhaps commemorating this victory, was inaugurated by the Pandyas in 1097 AD. Literary references to Kulottunga's victory over the Chera Bow Emblem, the fall of Kanthalur Shala, the retreat of the Chera king (Kulasekhara) from the battlefield, and the Chola occupation of Vizhinjam should be understood in connection with these events. Significantly, the port of Vizhinjam was renamed "Rajendra Chola Pattinam" by the Cholas in 1091 AD.

The weakened authority of Kulasekhara during this period is evident from several inscriptions. In 1099 AD, Pulloor Kumaran Kumarathichan, the leader of the Nair warriors of Nedumpurayur Nadu in central Kerala, is recorded as administering the affairs of Nedumpuram Thali (Wadakkanchery), a royal temple that had originally been state-sponsored. Earlier in the same year, Rama Kulasekhara, together with the Four Brahmin Ministers (the Nalu Thali) and the Thrikkunnappuzha, is recorded as residing at and issuing orders from the Great Temple (Nediya Thali) at Kodungallur. In this record, the king ordered the cancellation of the Annual Dues and the War Tax levied on Perunneyathal.

=== Recovery of Kollam ===
Rama Kulasekhara appears to have recovered Kollam around c. 1102 AD. A major battle, according to later Kerala traditions, perhaps involving Mana Vikrama of Eranadu and his Nair warriors, known as the "Poonthura Nairs", seems to have played a crucial role in this recovery. The Chola advance into the port of Kollam must therefore have been short-lived, with their forces perhaps retreating to Kottar (Nagercoil).

A reference survives to a council held at Kollam in 1102 CE, attended by king Rama Kulasekhara, his Brahmin council Nalu Thali, the Commander of the Thousand Nairs, the Leader of the Nairs of Venadu, and, among others, Mana Vikrama "Punthurakkon" — the future Zamorin — described as "the first among the samanthas". At this council, Rama Kulasekhara is said, in a somewhat unusual act, to have publicly atoned for the "wrongs" committed by him against the Brahmins. This record was probably issued in the aftermath of the violent recovery of Kollam.

=== Vikrama Chola's south Kerala campaign ===
The later years of Rama Kulasekhara's reign witnessed Vikrama Chola's campaign in south Kerala (c. 1102–c. 1118 AD) against the medieval Chera state. This expedition was probably carried out by the Pandya Jatavarman Parakrama (the Pandya feudatory of Vikrama Chola). Records mention the defeat of the Chera in Malai Nadu, the levying of tribute from the Chera king (Kulasekhara?), and the capture of Vizhinjam and "Kanthalur Shala". The "Kupaka" (the ruler of Venadu?) ruler also appears to have offered his daughter in marriage to Parakrama Pandya; Parakrama is also recorded as having visited the Anantapuram Temple during this period. The "Vikrama Colan Ula" remembers a coronation ceremony attended by the Thondaiman, who in a single campaign scattered the armies of Malai Nadu; the Kalingar Kon, who with his victorious banner put to flight many a prince in Vengai, Vizhinjam, Kollam, Irattam and Oddam; the king of Venadu, who drove the rogue elephant which caused people to tremble; the munificent Nulamban, who conquered Kottar belonging to the Pandyas, and Kollam; Thrigarthan, who overthrew Kongu and knocked down the crags of Kodagu; besides the Keralan (the Chera ruler) and others.

A Tanjore inscription of Vikrama Chola, dated to his fourth regnal year (1122 AD), notably refers to "the flight of the Chera king to the sea". Rama Kulasekhara is also remembered in a Thiruvalanjuli record of Vikrama Chola, dated to 1122 AD, in connection with a certain Kizhan Adikal, a Chera princess. By 1121, an unnamed "Kupaka" ruler had defeated Pandya king Rajasimha and extended his conquests as far as Nanjinadu and Kottar (Nagercoil). Vira Kerala, the first independent ruler of Venadu — possibly the son of Rama Kulasekhara, as per tradition — is mentioned in a Cholapuram temple inscription dated to 1126 CE.

There is a tradition that the last Chera ruler of Kerala, towards the end of his reign, shifted his capital from Mahodayapuram (Kodungallur) to Kollam and became the ancestor of the Venadu rulers through his marriage to the Venadu princess (who was the sister of the then Venadu ruler). According to this tradition, the later rulers of Kodungallur were descended from his sister. Ramavarma's son, Vira Kerala, inherited his political authority and the title "Kulasekhara Perumal" in Kollam, while his sister's son, born to a Brahmin, inherited his religious authority in Kodungallur along with the sacred title "Koyil Adhikarikal". Traditional accounts further date the first marital alliances between princes bearing the title "Koyil Adhikarikal" and Venadu princesses to Kollam Era 300 (1125 AD).

== Epigraphic records ==
Note: Material: granite; script: Vattezhuthu with Grantha; and language: early Malayalam (unless otherwise stated).

Year	Location	Contents		
Year	Location	Nature	Royal Name	Notes
c. 1089 (no regnal year)	Panthalayani Kollam Bhagavathi temple inscription - courtyard of Panthalayani Kollam Bhagavathi temple	Royal order	"Kulasekhara - Koyil Adhikarikal"	The Koyil Adhikarikal ordered that, from the annual dues (the Attaikoil) of Panthalayani Kollam, the Village Assembly (the Ur) was granted five nazhi out of every six nazhi, along with the melpadi of Thathamangalam.
1092 AD (3rd regnal year) Jupiter - Makaram	Thiruvaloor temple inscription (built into the entrance of the temple) - on Periyar	Temple committee resolution	"Kulasekhara Perumal"	A council of the Village Assembly (the Ur) and the Village Assembly Secretary (the Pothuval), in the presence of one Kadaingothu Narayanan Ravi Koyil, at the Aralur temple.; The council unanimously appointed the priests of the temple and fixed their remuneration and terms of service.
1099 AD (10th regnal year) Jupiter - Karkadakam (month -Vrishchikam)	Perunna temple inscription (west side of the central shrine in temple)	Royal order	"Kulasekhara"	King residing and issuing orders from the Great Temple (the Nediya Thali) at Kodungallur.: King sitting in council with the Four Brahmin Ministers (the Nalu Thali) and the Thrikkunnappuzha at the Great Temple (the Nediya Thali) at Kodungallur.; The king ordered the cancellation of Annual Dues (the Attaikkol) and War Tax (the Aranthai) from Perunneyathal.; The institution of Namaskaram and Maparatham with the above amount and handed it over to the Perunneyathal Village Assembly (the Ur) and Village Assembly Secretary (the Pothuval).; Royal orders to this effect were sent to the Kudippadis through messengers.; The record specifically mentions that the assembly caused a stone marking the cancellation of the War Tax to be erected there.
1099 (10th regnal year) Jupiter - Karkadakam (month - Minam)	Nedumpuram Thali (Wadakkanchery) inscriptions (right side of half-wall of the entrance corridor through the vathilmadam of the temple)	Temple inscription (10th year)	"Ma[ha] Ko Rama" (10th year)	Period of Manangattu Kumaran Ravi as the chief of Nedumpurayur Nadu (Wadakkanchery).; Pulloor Kumaran Kumarathichan, the leader of the Nair warriors of Nedumpurayur Nadu, supervises the Nedumpuram temple, making some arrangements in the temple.; Kumarathichan was perhaps not entitled to supervise the Nedumpuram temple.
1100 AD (11th regnal year) Jupiter - Chingam	Nedumpuram Thali (Wadakkanchery) inscriptions (right side of half-wall of the entrance corridor through the vathilmadam of the temple)	Temple committee resolution (11th year)	King's name or regnal year not mentioned (11th year)	A resolution revoking the arrangements made by Kumarathichan.; Period of Thalappulathu Kandan Kumaran as the chief of Nedumpurayur Nadu.; Kanjirappalli Ravi Kannapiran, the leader of the Nair warriors of Nedumpurayur Nadu, sitting in council in the temple decided to cancel the decision taken by Pulloor Kumaran Kumarithichan, the former leader of the Nair warriors of Nedumpurayur Nadu.; Kannapiran gave orders to this effect to the officials of Nithyaviyareswaram temple. Fine is prescribed for the violation of the rules.
Dated in 278 Kollam Era; 1102 AD (2+11 =13th regnal year); Jupiter - Kanni (month - [Chingam])	Rameswaram temple inscription (Kollam) (pillar set up in the courtyard of Rameswaram temple) or 'Quilon Inscription of Kollam 278'	Royal order	"Rama Thiruvadi Koyil Adhikarikal alias Sri Kulasekhara Chakravarthikal"	Rama Varma calls himself "Chakravarthikal" - i.e., independent ruler. Residing and issuing orders from Panankavil Palace, "Kurakkeni" Kollam.; King sitting in council with the Arya Brahmins, the Four Brahmin Ministers (the Nalu Thali), the Leader of the Thousand Nairs (the Ayiram), the Leader of the Six Hundred of Venadu (the Arunutruvar), and Mana Vikrama Punthurakkon, the chief of Eranadu (the first among the samanthas).; King made amends for some offence against the Arya Brahmins by donating paddy for the daily feeding of Brahmins and leasing out a Crown Land for that purpose to Kumara Udaya Varma, the chief of Venadu.; The king makes provision for Koothu (the Dance) and offering at Thirukkunavaya (Jain?) temple.; Witnesses are mentioned
1122 AD - 4th regnal year of king Vikrama Chola (coronation 1118 AD) Material: granite blocks, script: Tamil, and language: Tamil.	Thiruvanchuli/Thiruvalanjuli temple inscription (Tanjore) - south wall of the mandapa in front of the central shrine in Kapardiswara temple	Temple inscription	"Cheramanar Rama Varma"	Dated in the regnal years of king Vikrama Chola.; Mentions a gift of money for the daily offering of a garland to the deity of the temple for the benefit of the Chera king Rama Varma.; Certain Kizhan Adikal - the medieval Chera princess - is mentioned in another line.

== Literary evidences ==
A medieval Malayalam sloka names the last "Cheraman" (Chera ruler) as "Rama Varma".

"Arum nerittu nillar ariya netuvirippoteto vanmelallo
Nireki pantotukkattakhila gunanidhe Ceraman Rama Varma".

— Medieval Malayalam sloka, Ulloor S. Parameswara Ayyar (Ed.), Vijnanadeepika, IV

=== Patron of Vasubhatta ===
Vasubhatta, a famous Yamaka poet of medieval Kerala, names his patron king as "Rama". A later commentary on a poem by Vasubhatta says that "Kulasekhara" was the regnal title of king Rama. Scholars generally consider this a result of confusion on the part of the commentators (between Sthanu Ravi Kulasekhara and Rama Rajasekhara) who were separated in time from Vasubhatta. Some scholars identify king Rama Kulasekhara as the patron of poet Vasubhatta (and with royal dramatist Kulasekhara Varma). This view is generally found unacceptable on several counts.

== Accounts of disappearance ==
It is popularly believed in the Kerala tradition that the last Chera ruler (the Cheraman Perumal) disappeared from the Kerala "mysteriously" (after having partitioned the Chera kingdom among his kinsmen). In a popular version of the legend, the last Chera ruler or the Cheraman Perumal, before his departure from Kerala, converted to Islam (and then travelled to Mecca for the hajj pilgrimage). The legends are not clear about the religion the king seems to have converted. However, the legend of Cheraman Perumal was used by the later kings in Kerala for the legitimation of their rule.

Identification of the Cheraman Perumal from the legend with Rama Kulasekhara remains an ambiguous hypothesis.

== See also ==
- Chera dynasty
- Kulothunga Chola I
- Legend of Cheraman Perumals
