= Kulottunga I =

Chola emperor from 1070 to 1122

- Rajakesarivarman, Chakravartigal, Rajanarayana, Tribhuvana Chakravartigal, Konerinmaikondaan, Sungam Thavirtha Cholan, Jayadhara, Virudarajabhayankara ( Terror to Vikramaditya VI)
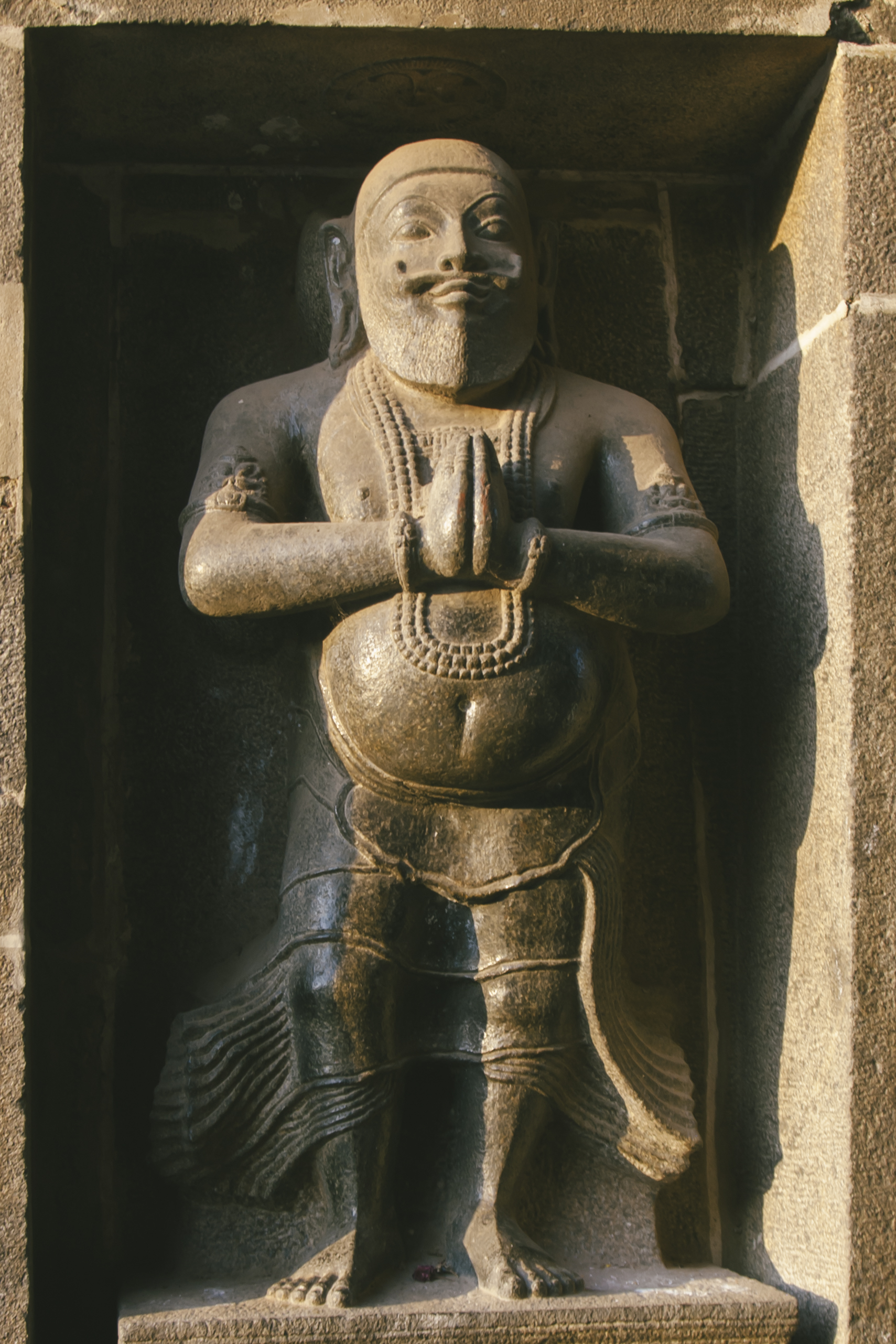
- Sculpture of Kulottunga I at Nataraja Temple.

Chola emperor
- Reign: 9 June 1070 – 1122
- Predecessor: Athirajendra
- Successor: Vikrama

Eastern Chalukya King
- Reign: c. 1061 – c. 1118
- Predecessor: Rajaraja Narendra
- Successor: Vikramaditya VI

King of Kadaram
- Reign: c. 1070
- Predecessor: Athirajendra
- Successor: Position abolished (Tribhuwanaraja as king of Melayu)

King of Anuradhapura; King of Dakkinadesa; King of Ruhuna
- Reign: c. 1070 (few months)
- Predecessor: Athirajendra
- Successor: Vijayabahu I
- Born: Rajendra Chalukya; 1025; Chelluru, Vengi, Chola empire (modern day Rayavaram, Andhra Pradesh, India)
- Died: 1122 (aged 96–97); Gangaikonda Cholapuram, Chola empire (modern day Jayankondam, Tamil Nadu, India)
- Empress: DinaChintamani; Madurantaki; Thyagavalli; Elisai Vallabhi; Solakulavalliyār
- Issue: Rajaraja Chodaganga; Vira Chola; Vikrama Chola; Suttamalli; Ammangai Alvar
Regnal name
- Kō Rājakēsarivarman alias Chakravarti Kulōttunga Chōladeva
- Dynasty: Chola (mother's side); Eastern Chalukya (father's side)
- Father: Rajaraja Narendra
- Mother: Amangai Devi
- Religion: Hinduism
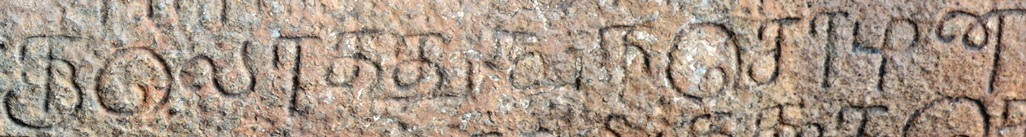
- Signature

Kulottunga Chola I (/kʊˈloʊtʊŋɡə/; Middle Tamil: Kulōttuṅka Cōḻaṉ; 1025–1122) also spelt Kulothunga (lit. 'The Exalter of His Clan'), born Rajendra Chola, was a Chola Emperor who reigned from 1070 to 1122 succeeding his cousin Athirajendra Chola. He also served as the Eastern Chalukya monarch from 1061 to 1118, succeeding his father Rajaraja Narendra. He is related to the Chola dynasty through his mother's side and the Eastern Chalukyas through his father's side. His mother, Ammangaidevi, was a Chola princess and the daughter of emperor Rajendra Chola I. His father was king Rajaraja Narendra of the Eastern Chalukya dynasty who was the nephew of Rajendra and maternal grandson of Rajaraja Chola I. According to historian Sailendra Nath Sen, his accession marked the beginning of a new era and ushered in a period of internal peace and benevolent administration. He was succeeded by his son Vikrama Chola.

Kulottunga had diplomatic relations with the northern Indian city Kannauj and also with distant countries like Cambodia, Srivijaya, Khmer, Pagan (Burma), and China. He established Chola overlordship over the Srivijayan province of Kedah in Malay Peninsula. An inscription in a Taoist temple in Guangzhou, dated to 1079, declares Kulottunga, king of Chulien (Chola) to be the supreme chief of the Land of San-fo-tsi (Srivijaya). According to Tan Yeok Seong, the editor of the inscription, Kulottunga ruled both the Chola and Srivijayan kingdoms. In the small Leyden grant that is dated to 1090, the king of Kadaram (Srivijaya) is mentioned as a vassal of Kulottunga. Like his predecessors, Kulottunga was a patron of arts and literature and the much celebrated Tamil poem Kalingattuparani was composed during his rule by poet Jayamkondaan who lived in his court. His records also testify to the highly organised system of fiscal and local administration. During his reign Kulottunga carried out a massive land survey that formed the basis for taxation.

Kulottunga died around 1122 around the age of 97, although this is disputed. This makes him one of the longest living monarchs in the Middle Ages. He was succeeded by his son Vikrama Chola. According to historian Nilakanta Sastri, Kulottunga avoided unnecessary wars and evinced a true regard for the well-being of his subjects. He had a long and prosperous reign characterized by unparalleled success that laid the foundation for the well being of the empire for the next 150 years.

== Birth and early life ==
Kulottunga was born under the star of Pusya around 1025. The details of the king's family and parentage are available from a number of grants and plates like the one from Chelluru (a village in Rayavaram Mandalam of Konaseema district) that was issued by his son, prince Vira Chola, and from literary works, such as the famous poem Kalingattupparani. Kulottunga was the maternal grandson of Emperor Rajendra Chola I through the latter's daughter Ammangadevi. His father was the Eastern Chalukya king Rajaraja Narendra who himself was the son of Kundavai, the younger sister of Rajendra Chola I and the daughter of Rajaraja I. Rajaraja Narendra married princess Ammangadevi, the daughter of his maternal uncle, Rajendra Chola I of the solar ra. The latter is described as "the ornament of the race of the sun" in the Chellur plates of Vira Chola. The poem Kalingattuparani gives the details of Kulottunga's birth in the canto "Avataram" (incarnation), wherein his mother is described as belonging to the solar race and his father to the lunar ra. Kulottunga is described as an avatar of the Hindu god Vishnu in the canto. An excerpt from the poem reads:

Vishnu appeared again in the royal womb of the queen of him of the race of the moon which dispels all darkness, ... Rajaraja's gracious Lakshmi (queen) who was of the rival race of the sun.

As a Chola prince he conquered the Sri Vijaya province Kedah and Chakrakota province (Bastar-Kalahandi district-Koraput region) on behalf of his maternal uncle, emperor Virarajendra Chola, in the 11th century.

== Accession ==
According to the Tamil poem Kalingattuparani, Kulottunga was brought up in the court of Rajendra Chola I in Gangaikondacholapuram. During his youth, Kulottunga participated in many wars, serving alongside both Rajendra Chola I and his successors, Rajadhiraja I, Rajendra Chola II and Virarajendra Chola. During this period, he engaged in the northern campaigns of the empire in and around Sakkarakottam and Vayiragaram where he secured several victories and proved his mettle in warfare. The Sakkarakottam area is identified with the present day Bastar-Kalahandi district-Koraput region which together formed the Chakrakota province back in medieval times. According to Kalingattuparani, it was around this time that Mannar-Mannavan, that is, the "king of kings", suddenly died and the empire was thrown into a state of anarchy until Abhaya, that is Kulottunga, returned and restored order.

The Teki, Chellur and Pithapuram grants of Kulottunga's sons, dated in the 17th, 21st and 23rd years of the king's reign, state that in the absence of the king's father, Rajaraja Narendra, Kulottunga was first crowned as the lord of Vengi where he obtained great fame. As per the plates. the king was later crowned in the Chola Rajya, a position said to be not less exalted than Devendra (Indra). These events are narrated as a flashback story in the Chellur grant, wherein Kulottunga explains to his son, prince Vira Chola, that he left Vengi to his (Kulottunga's) paternal uncle (Vijayaditya) as he (Kulottunga) desired the Chola kingdom.

Other sources like Vikramankadevacharita, a work on the western Chalukya Vikramaditya VI by his court poet Bilhana, and Vikraman Solan Ula, a work on Kulottunga's son and successor Vikrama Chola by poet Ottakoothar, corroborate these events more or less and both works agree that there was a king between Virarajendra Chola and Kulottunga. This king has been identified with Adhirajendra and it is after the death of this Chola king that the kingdom was thrown into a state of anarchy. According to Vikramankadevacharita, Kulottunga got dislodged from Vengi due to some confusion in the Chola kingdom after the death of Virarajendra Chola. Even during the time of Virarajendra Chola, Vikramaditya VI and the Eastern Ganga king Rajaraja Devendravarman both supported Vijayaditya, the paternal uncle of Kulottunga, in his claim to the Vengi kingdom. Kulottunga is then said to have marched south to the Chola capital. Bilhana goes on to state that his patron, Vikramaditya VI, tried stopping Kulottunga from ascending the Chola throne by instead installing Adhirajendra (Vikramaditya's brother-in-law) as king. However this arrangement was short-lived and Kulottunga eventually succeeded in capturing the throne. Historian Nilakanta Sastri argues against the theories proposed by Fleet and other similar historians, about a hostile invasion of the Chola empire by Kulottunga. In Sastri's words, "the work Vikramankadevacarita does not contain the remotest suggestion that Kulottunga put his rivals out of the way by secret murder or even by open fighting".

Ottakoothar's Vikrama Cholan Ula mentions Kulottunga's reign:

The first Kulothunga Chola conquered the Pandya king with his fish banner and the Chera king with his bow banner. He defeated his enemy kings in Kanthalurchalai, two times and took over the lands of Konganam and Karnataka. Defeating warriors on the battlefield, he subdued the valor of the Marata kings.

His rule spread until the northern lands. He removed and crushed poverty and reduced taxes. His wheel of dharma encircled the world surrounded by the ocean. He, the king Abhaya Chola decorated with his shining Athi garland and gave grace to his land.

Such is the glory of the father of Vikrama Chola.

— Ottakoothar, Vikrama Cholan Ula, verse 24

Kulottunga's own inscriptions also speak of the lack of leadership in the Chola country before ascension and in his records the king claims that he rightfully inherited the excellent crown of the Cholas. The king's epigraphs poetically claim that he ascended the throne to prevent the goddess Lakshmi of Southern region from becoming common property (an allusion to the illegitimate claims to the throne and meddling of affairs by kings of rival kingdoms), and to remove the loneliness of the goddess of the Chola country adorned by river Ponni (an allusion to the power vacuum in the empire). Thus it was under these circumstances that Kulottunga ascended the Chola throne in 1070 and established himself by soon overcoming the threats to the Chola empire. According to Sastri, Kulottunga was in his teens or barely into his twenties when he ascended the throne. Military campaigns

=== Sakkarakottam ===
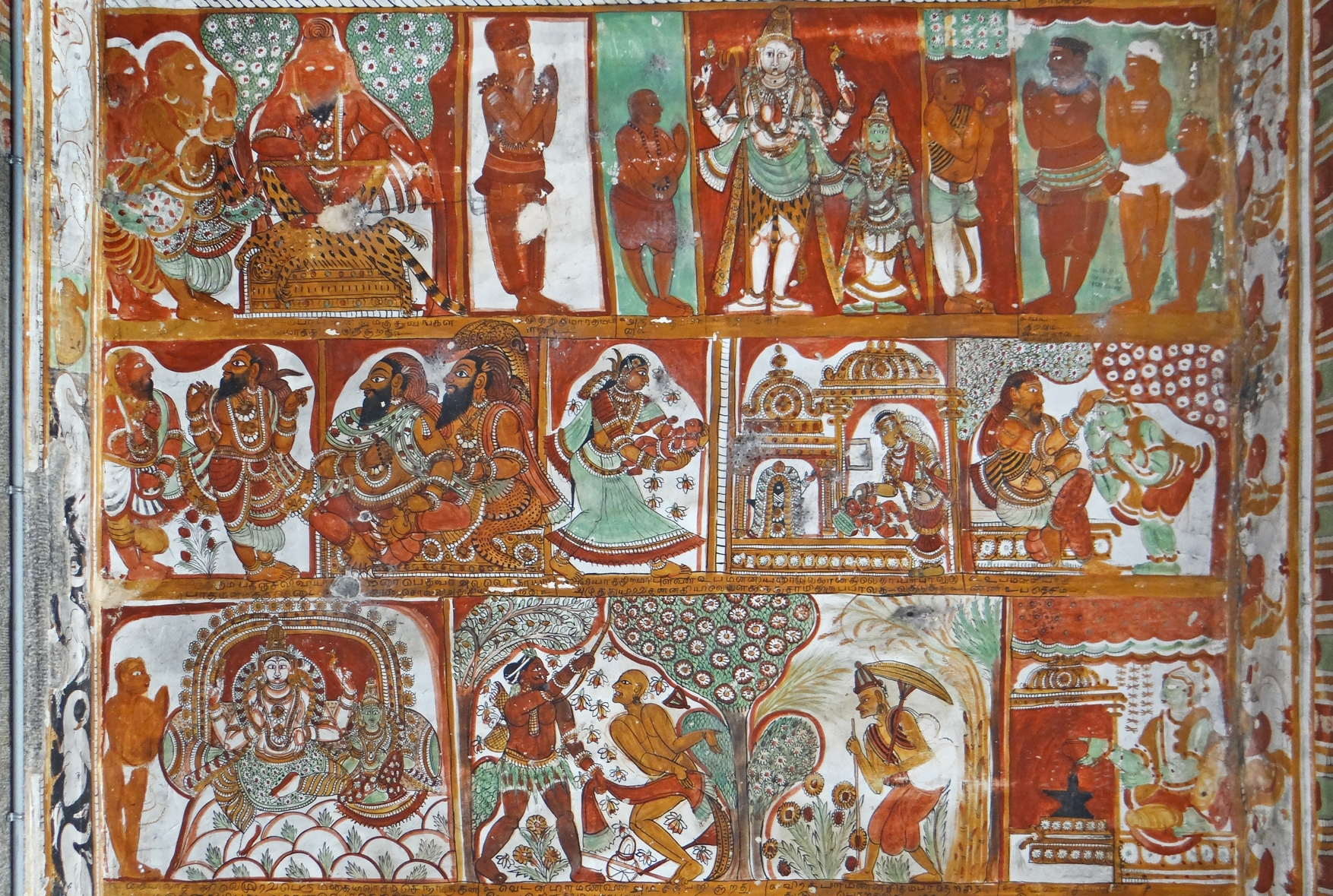
Mural depicting the story of Shiva and Parvati.

When Kulottunga was still a prince, he participated in many of the northern campaigns of his predecessor Virarajendra Chola. In the fifth year of his reign Virarajendra Chola dispatched his army to Kalinga and beyond it to Sakkarakottam. These expeditions appear to have been led by Kulottunga, who in his inscriptions claims that while he was still heir-apparent, he overcame the treachery of his enemies and by the strength of his arm and sword captured herds of elephants at Vayiragaram, conquered Sakkarakottam and graciously took tribute from the king of Dhara. Vayiragaram is identified with Wairagarh, a few miles off Bastar in the Chanda district and Sakkarakottam is the area in and around Bastar-Kalahandi-Koraput region which was called as the Chakrakota mandala in medieval times. Dhara is the Nagavanshi king Dharavarsha who was the ruler of Sakkarakottam during this period. The "treachery" that Kulottunga speaks of is an allusion to the internal politics of the empire and the schemes of his rivals who sought to deny him his rightful inheritan. According to Sastri, in spite of these setbacks, Kulottunga was successful in carving out a small principality for himself, north of Vengi, for Kulottunga claims that he gently raised the goddess of the earth residing in the "Land of the rising sun" and placed her under the shade of his parasol just like god Vishnu, who in his Varaha avatar lifted the earth.

== Conflict on Southern India ==
=== Western Chalukya conflicts ===
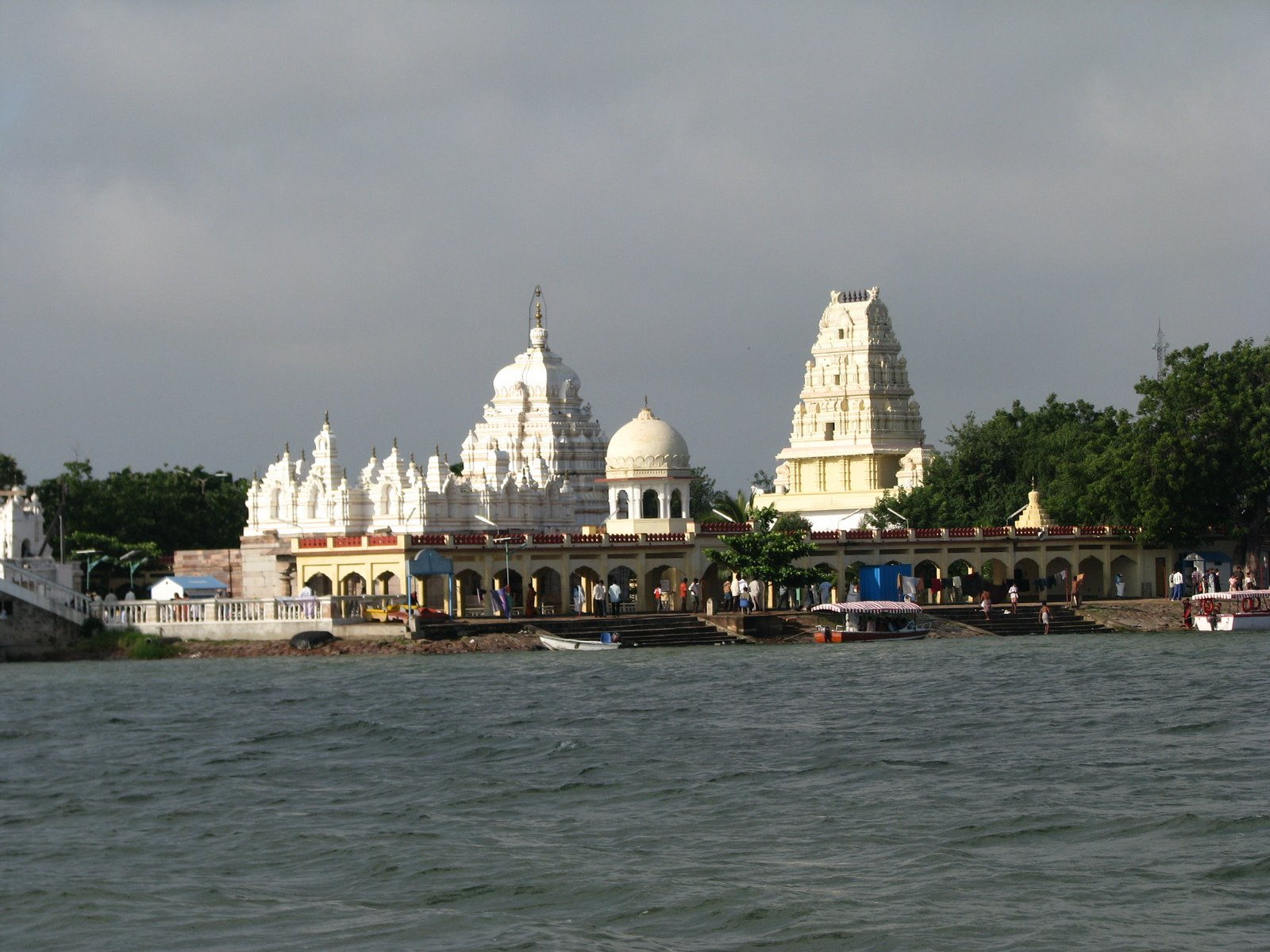
Kudala sangama, the site of many a battle between the Cholas and Chalukyas during the period of Virarajendra Chola

The western Chalukya-Chola rivalry goes back to the beginning of the 10th century. The Western Chalukyas waged many wars with the Chola emperors, and on each occasion the wars ended with the Cholas chasing their rivals, the Chalukyas, out of the battlefield, occupying their capital, with the death of their generals or feudatories and levying tribute. Tailapa II and his son Satyashraya, who were opponents of Raja Raja Chola I and Rajendra Chola I, ended up being defeated at Annigeri and at Kogali respectively, Jayasimha was defeated in Kadambalige, Ahavamalla Someshwara I suffered defeats many a time at the hands of Rajadhiraja Chola, and lost his brother Jayasingan in battle with Rajendra Chola II.

After Rajadhiraja Chola I and Rajendra Chola II, their brother Virarajendra Chola defeated Ahavamalla Someshwara I on not less than five occasions. Virarajendra Chola also put to flight the latter's two sons, Vikkalan (Vikramaditya VI) and Singanan (Jayasimha III), multiple times in the battles of Kudala sangama. Virarajendra Chola also defeated the eldest son of Ahavamalla Someshwara I, and crown-prince Someshwara II in the Battle of Kampili, and spoiled his coronation ceremony. Ahavamalla Someshwara I seems to have died in the reign of Virarajendra Chola as there is no mention of him in Kulottunga's records. This is evident from a record of Virarajendra Chola, who in his fifth year states that unable to bear the disgrace of his earlier defeats, Ahavamalla Someshwara I wrote a letter to the Chola calling for war, but in the end never showed up and instead fled and plunged himself into the ocean. This is conceded in Bilhana's Vikramankadevacharita, a work on the life of Vikramaditya VI who claims that Ahavamalla Someshwara I died around this time by committing ritual suicide by drowning himself in the Tungabhadra. Upon his father's death, Vikramaditya VI approached Virarajendra and sued for peace and the Chola agreed as he saw in him an ally to counter and nullify the crown-prince Someshvara II. Accordingly, the Chola offered his daughter's hand in marriage, bestowed upon him the Rattapadi-seven-and-a-half-lakh country and made him the Vallabha (Chalukyan king). Vikramaditya readily accepted the deal for he had his own plans to overthrow his elder brother, which he would eventually accomplish and then usurp the throne. There was also another contender, Vijayaditya, on whom Virarajendra had bestowed Vengi towards the end of his reign. Some historians identify this Vijayaditya with the Eastern Chalukyan prince and half-brother of Rajaraja Narendra while others like Venkayya suggest that this person was yet another younger brother of Vikramaditya VI. That this Vijayaditya was an ally of Vikramaditya VI is evident from an inscription of Rajadhiraja Chola I. So at the end of Virarajendra reign, Kulottunga found himself facing Vikkalan (Vikramaditya VI), the latter's younger brother Singanan (Jayasimha), their elder brother Someshwara II and their younger brother or ally Vijayaditya.

It was clear from the time Kulottunga ascended the throne that a confrontation with the Western Chalukyas was imminent as Vikramaditya VI could never accept the union of the Chola and Vengi kingdoms under the same ruler, let alone Kulottunga accession, for it simply meant an enemy too powerful. Kulottunga knew this from the very beginning and accordingly made preparations for the showdown. In 1075-76, the war began with the incursion of the Chalukyan forces into the Chola territories and the two armies met in the Kolar district. What followed was the Chola counter-attack popularly known as the Nangili episode. In the ensuing battle, the Chalukyan army was completely routed and chased by the Chola forces from the rocky roads of Nangili all the way to the Tungabhadra via Manalur. Vikramaditya is said to have retreated hastily and fled, leaving behind the corpses of his dead elephants along the way. Kulottunga captured a thousand elephants at Navilai and conquered two provinces the Gangamandalam (the province of the Western Ganga dynasty) and Singanam as a direct result of this war. Navilai has been identified with Navale-nadu in the Mysore district, and Singanam referred to the region of Jayasimha, the younger brother of Vikramaditya VI. The word Konkana desam (country of Konkan) is substituted for the word Singanam in some of the records. Kulottunga, in his records, claims that at the end of this war, he broke the pride of Vikramaditya VI and that Vikkalan (Vikramaditya VI) and Singanan (Jayasimha) had nowhere to retreat except to plunge into the western ocean. Some other records of Kulottunga state that Vikramaditya VI fled back to his own dominion (north of the Tungabhadra), his pride broken, and that he (Vikramaditya VI) was happy to be there as the Chalukya did not go to war with the Chola for a long time. This is conceded by Bilhana in the Vikramankadevacarita, wherein he states that after these initial wars, there was a long period of peace (about half a century) between the two kingdoms. The Western Chalukyas mounted several unsuccessful attempts to engage the Chola emperors in war, and except for a brief occupation of the Vengi territories between 1118 and 1126, allied with Prince Vikramaditya VI. After Vikramaditya's death in 1126, the Cholas began a slow process of encroachment over Vengi. By 1133 Vikrama Chola defeated Someshvara III in the Battle of Godavari with the help of Gonga II . Then Vikrama Chola Able to capture Vengi and recover kolar and some other parts of Gangavadi from Someshvara III.

=== Pandya campaign ===
Corrections by M. G. S. Narayanan on K. A. Nilakanta Sastri are employed.

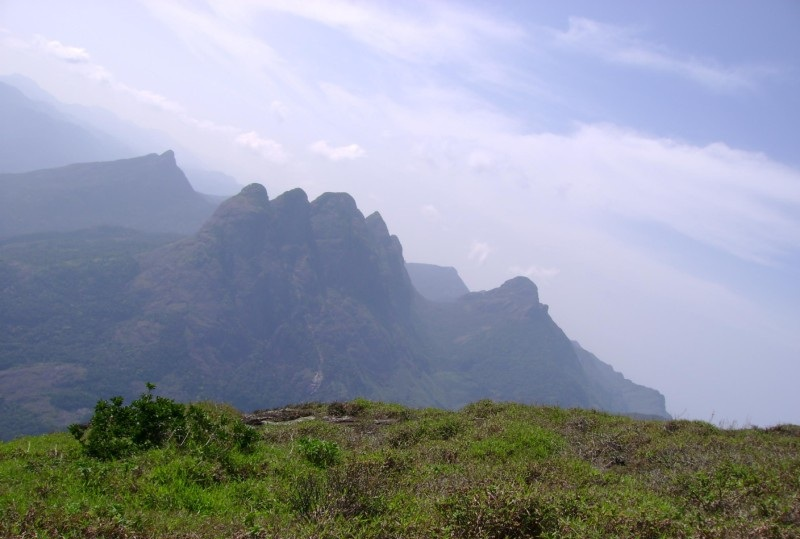
Podiyil Mountains (conquered by Kulottunga around 1077-81 AD)

Once he finished dealing with Vikramaditya VI, Kulottunga turned his attention to the south and first took up the cause of bringing the ancient Pandimandalam, the country of the Pandyas, into his fold. The Pandya country never reconciled to the Chola overlordship and its rulers were a constant source of trouble for the Chola emperors. The Pandyas made use of the confusion in the Chola country during the accession of Kulottunga and tried once again to reassert their independence.

Back in the days of Rajendra Chola I, the Pandya country was ruled over by Chola-Pandya viceroys, but by the time of Kulottunga, this system had ceased to exist and "Five Pandya" princes from the old line rose against the king. Kulottunga could not take this situation lightly as the loss of the Pandya territories meant a serious threat to the existence of the Chola kingdom itself. As soon as the Chalukyan war ended, Kulottunga turned all his energy to the suppression of the revolts in the Pandya territory (c. 1077-1081 AD). According to the Cholapuram inscription (1100 AD) the Cholas marched south with a huge army, conquered the Pandya country, the forests were the Five Pandya entered as refugees, the Pearl Fisheries, the Podiyil and Sahya Mountains, and Kanya Kumari and fixed the boundaries of the South Country (the Pandya country) at Kottar. Another inscription of his, in Sanskrit (undated) from Chidambaram, gives a similar account, where the king is said to have overcome the Five Pandyas with the help of a huge army, burnt down the fort at Kottar, and erected a pillar of victory at Kanya Kumari (and thus "making the rebel vassal kings obedient").

Kulottunga's Kerala campaign is now dated c. 1097 (it was initially assumed that the 1077-81 campaign also covered the rebelling Keralas). The Chera Perumal kings, who like their Pandyan neighbours, had followed suit and rebelled against their Chola overlords. Naralokavira Kalinga Rayan, a commander of the Pandya-Chola forces, lead a Chola thrust into Kerala and captured the port of Quilon. It seems that the Chera Perumals tried to recover the port Quilon soon afterwards. The eventual southern boundary of the Chola influence was located at Kottar.

By c. 1100, Kulottunga had successfully subjugated rebelling southern regions as far as the Pandya country, annexed the Pearl Fishery Coast, the ancient Podiyil mountains (in present-day Tirunelveli), and "fixed his southern boundary" at Kottar. He did away with the old system of appointing Chola-Pandya viceroys and instead built multiple cantonments as far south as Kottar, and heavily garrisoned the strategically important locations of the southern dominions. These units were in charge of protecting his interests and collecting tribute but did not interfere with the internal administration of the conquered territories, a responsibility which he left to the native chiefs and feudatories. His inscriptions belonging to this period are found in Cholapuram, Agastheeswaram, Suchindram, Variyur, Kanyakumari and Kottar.

== Conflict in Eastern India ==
=== Vengi ===
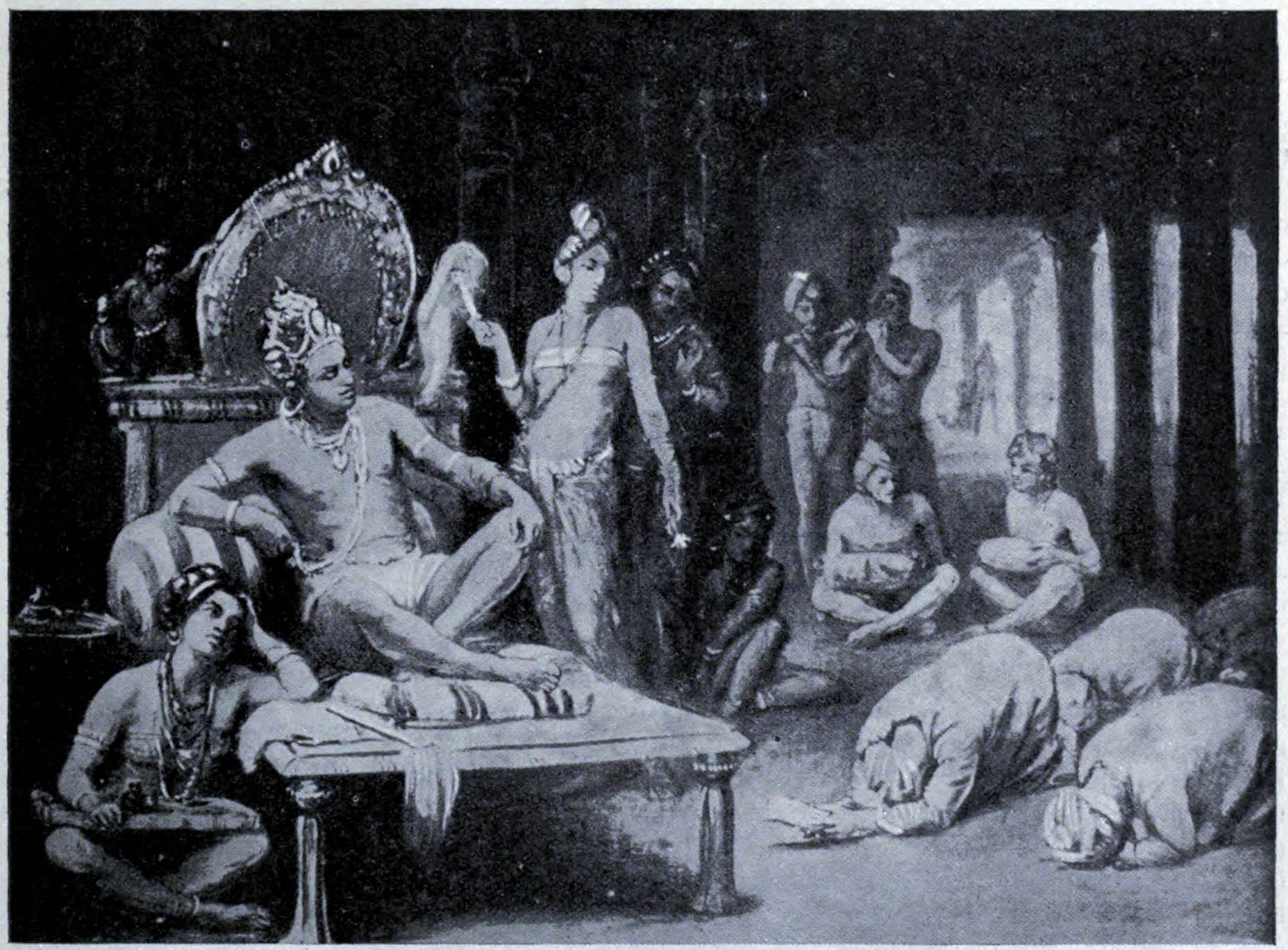
An artist's impression: Kulothunga I receiving a letter from Vikramaditya VI.

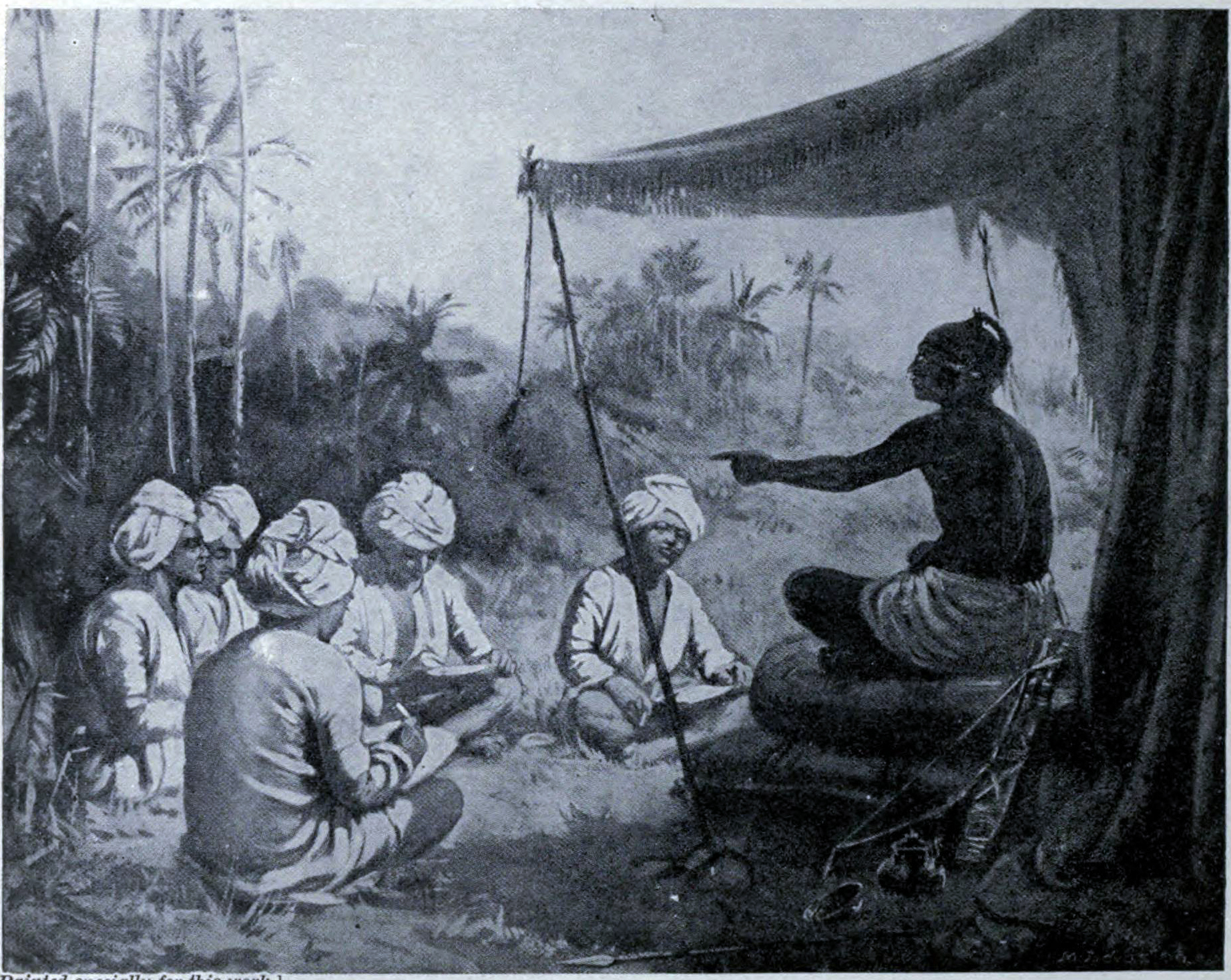
An artist's impression: Kulottunga Chola instructs the surveyors CE. 1086

The Vengi kingdom was a bone of contention between the Cholas, the Western Chalukyas of Kalyani and the Eastern Gangas from the times of Rajaraja Chola I. It was a site for proxy war during the times of Virarajendra Chola, who managed to wrest control of it from the Western Chalukyas and bestowed it on Vijayaditya, the paternal uncle of Kulottunga. It is unclear as to why Kulottunga was overlooked in the accession of Vengi as he would have been the rightful heir. On the other hand, it is of interest to note that Vijayaditya had briefly sided with Rajaraja Devendravarman of the Eastern Gangas. So, Virarajendra Chola agreed to bestow the Vengi kingdom on Kulottunga's paternal uncle Vijayaditya to avoid fighting wars on two fronts, that is, to avoid engaging both the Western Chalukyas and the Eastern Gangas. In any case, Kulottunga was generous enough to let his paternal uncle, the usurper Vijayaditya, to rule over Vengi even after he ascended the Chola throne. During this period in 1073, the Vengi kingdom was invaded by the Kalachuri king Yakshakarna of Tripuri. However, this was merely a raid in search of riches rather than an invasion for territorial gains, and the intruders were repulsed by Vijayaditya.

After the death of Vijayaditya in 1077, Kulottunga brought the Vengi province directly under his control and appointed his sons to rule over it. Rajaraja Chodaganga, the eldest son of Kulottunga, was first appointed as viceroy but as per inscriptions, the prince did not feel at home and returned to the Chola dominions in the south within a year. According to the Teki plates of Rajaraja Chodaganga, the Vengi province under him lay between Manneru in the Nellore district in the south and Mahendragiri in Ganjam district in the north. Rajaraja Chodaganga was followed by his brother Vira Chola who ruled for six years until 1084. The Chellur plates of Vira Chola state that he was crowned in the city of Jagannatha (Jagannatha-nagari). The two princes once again governed the Vengi province alternately for a period of five years and four years respectively. They were then followed by their brother Vikrama Chola who ruled over the region until he was made heir apparent in 1118. According to the Pithapuram pillar inscription of Mallapadeva, dated 1202, the Vengi province became devoid of a ruler and fell into a state of anarchy when Vikrama Chola left for the Chola dominions in the south towards the end of Kulottunga's reign. Vikramaditya VI used this opportunity to occupy Vengi during this period. However, this invasion was short lived and Vikrama Chola recaptured the province and annexed it to the Chola empire as soon as he ascended the throne.

=== Kalinga wars ===
Extreme points of Kalinga, as mentioned in the historical records

The kingdom of Kalinga was not a single region but rather three distinct countries called Utkala or Odra (north and north-eastern parts of Odisha), Kosala or Dakshina Kosala (south-west Odisha and Chhattisgarh) and Kalinga proper. This region comprised the whole of present-day Odisha and northern part of Andhra Pradesh. These three regions together were referred to as Trikalinga. The Kalinga kingdom bordered the northern part of Vengi and therefore it was only natural for the different rulers of Kalinga to try and expand into the Eastern Chalukya territory or in the case of Kulottunga, the northern-eastern part of the Chola dominions. During the 11th century, the Kalinga kingdom was ruled by the Eastern Ganga dynasty who invariably became involved in Vengi and thereby indirectly in the Chola politics.

The records of Kulottunga contain descriptions of two Kalinga wars. Prior to these wars, Kulottunga's forces was decimated by Rajaraja Deva of the Eastern Ganga dynasty and Kulottunga was forced to marry his daughter (or sister) to Rajaraja Deva. Kulottunga was also forced to put his sons as the Viceroy of Kalinga. Rajaraja Deva died in 1078 and Kulottunga's sons were in-charge of the adolescent Anantavarman Chodaganga, Rajaraja Deva's son. The first war seems to have occurred before 1096 as Kulottunga first claims to have conquered Kalinga in a record dated in the 26th year of his reign. The first Kalinga war seems to have been brought about by Kalinga's aggression against Vengi. The war resulted in the annexation of the southern part of Kalinga to the Chola kingdom. This is evident from the Teki plates of Kulottunga's son, Rajaraja Chodaganga, whose dominions included the region up to Mahendragiri in the Ganjam district in the north.

The second invasion took place a few years later, sometime before the 33rd year of the king's reign, and is the subject of the Kalingattuparani. This expedition was led by his general Karunakara Tondaiman who defeated the Kalinga ruler Anantavarman Chodaganga of the Eastern Ganga dynasty. Anantavarman was the son of Rajaraja Devendravarman and Chola princess Rajasundari, described as the daughter of Rajendra Chola. The identification of Anantavarman's maternal grandfather is a controversial topic. Some historians like Sastri identify this Rajendra Chola with Virarajendra Chola while others like Kielhorn identify this king as Kulottunga. According to the poem Kalingattuparani, this relationship did not stop Kulottunga from invading Kalinga and causing Anantavarman to flee. The Chola army is said to have returned with vast booty from this campaign. This fact is also borne out by an inscription of the king from the Bhimeswara temple in Draksharama. It is dated in the 33rd year of the king's reign and states that an officer of the king, titled variously as Pallavaraja and Vanduvaraja, reduced the whole of Kalinga to ashes, destroyed the Ganga Devendravarman in battle with the aid of the Kosala army, and planted a pillar of victory in the Odra frontier so as to raise aloft the fame of his king, Kulottunga Chola. This chief is none other than Karunakara Tondaiman as he is said to be from Thirunaraiyur nadu and the lord of Vandai as in the poem. His personal name is given as Thiruvarangan and is said to be the son of Sirilango of Vandalanjeri in Thirunaraiyur nadu. He is described as a sad-vaishnava (good vaishnavite) and is said to have built a Vishnu temple made of black stone in Alavely.

According to the poem, the reason for the second war was a response to the default of Kalinga in its payment of annual tributes to Kulottunga by Anantavarman. Another view, by some historians like Venkayya is that, Kulottunga took up the expedition in order to help his relative Anantavarman against North Kalinga rebels. Yet another view is that, Devendravarman belonged to a collateral line of the Eastern Ganga dynasty and had opposed the accession of Kulottunga's relative Anantavarman. There is an inscription of Kulottunga from the Bhimeswara temple in Godavari district that describes a gift by the son of Anantavarmadeva. So it would seem that the latter was a vassal or at least in friendly terms with Kulottunga for sometime.

== Revolt in Sri Lanka ==
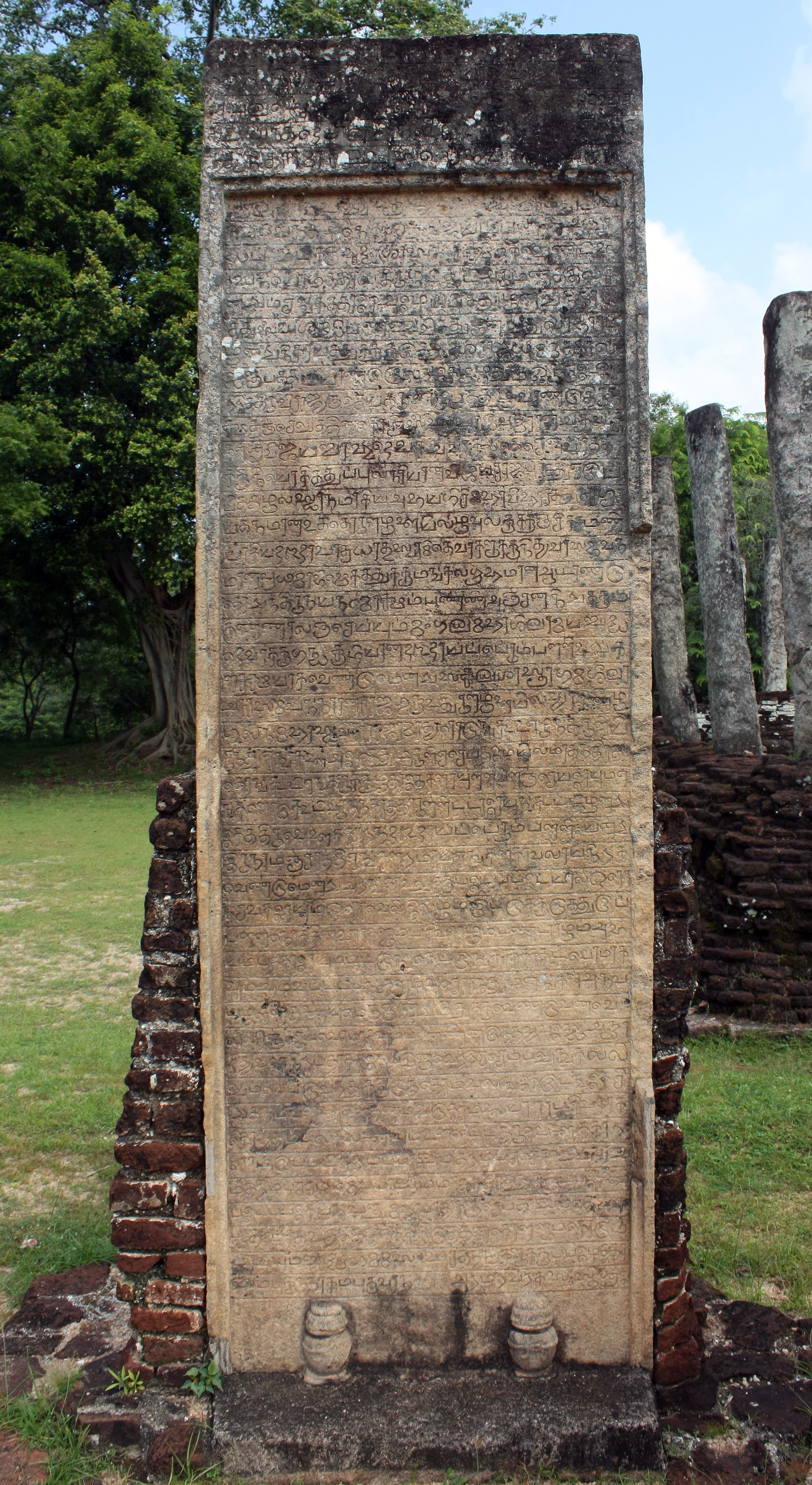
Velakkara in Polonnaruwa written in Tamil and Sanskrit. c. 1070 CE

According to the Mahavamsa, the Cholas were driven out of Lanka in the 15th year of Vijayabahu which coincides with the accession date of Kulottunga. Therefore, it would seem that the Sinhalese king took the opportunity to attack the Chola forces in the island nation at a time when the kingdom under Kulottunga was dealing with multiple revolts and attacks in the mainland. In 1070, Vijayabahu attacked the Chola forces from his enclave in the Rohana district and defeated them. He sent two armies, one from Mahanagakula via Dakkinadesa, and the other via the well known route along Mahavali-Ganga. These armies defeated the Chola forces and captured Anuradhapura and Polonnaruwa. Cholas were forced to dispatch an expedition from mainland to recapture the settlements in Northern Ceylon and carry the attack back into Rohana. What had begun as the profitable incursion and the occupation was now deteriorating into desperate attempts to retain a foothold in the north. The occupation ended in Chola Withdrawal after the further series of indecisive clashesAfter this, Vijayabahu got himself anointed in Anuradhapura. A few months later he moved to Polonnaruwa, renamed it as Vijayarajapura, made it his capital, and declared himself king of the island nation.

Unlike the epigraphs of his predecessors, like Rajaraja Chola I, Rajendra Chola I and Rajadhiraja Chola I, that describe the details of their expeditions to the island nation, Kulottunga's inscriptions are generally silent in regards to Lanka or with regards to any campaigns or wars against the Sinhalese rulers. According to Sastri, Kulottunga was content with keeping the Chola empire from disintegrating on the mainland and was not that affected with the loss of the island nation.

It is of interest to note that Vijayabahu married Lilavati, the daughter of Jagatipala, a former ruler of Rohana, after she escaped from the Cholas and returned to the island kingdom. Jagatipala was originally a prince of Ayodhya who had migrated to Lanka and become ruler of Rohana. He was slain on the battlefield during the Lankan expeditions of Kulottunga's predecessor, Rajadhiraja Chola I, when the Sinhalese kingdom lost four crowns in quick succession. At that time, this princess along with her aunt or mother was taken captive by the Chola forces. These events are described in great detail in the Mahavamsa and in an inscription of Rajadhiraja Chola I.

== Overseas trade ==
Srivijaya empire around 8th century

Kulottunga maintained overseas contacts with kingdoms of Sri Vijaya, China and Khmer Empire. The renaming of the famous harbor of Visakhapattanam in Andhra Pradesh as Kulottungacolapattanam also indicates his interest in trade with foreign countries across the Bay of Bengal. In 1077, king Chulien (Chola) Ti-hua-kialo sent an embassy to Chinese court for promoting trade. Sastri identifies this Chola ruler with Kulottunga. This trading venture seems to have ended profitably for the Cholas and they returned with over 81,000 strings of copper cash and many more valuables. The Khmer king Suryavarman II, builder of the famous Angkor Wat, sent a mission to the Chola dynasty and presented a precious stone to Kulottunga in 1114. According to Burmese accounts, Kyanzittha, the ruler of Pagan (Burma) met with the Chola royal family by sending an ambassador to the Chola emperor. In an inscription in Pagan, he even claims to have converted the Chola to Buddhism through a personal letter written on gold foils.

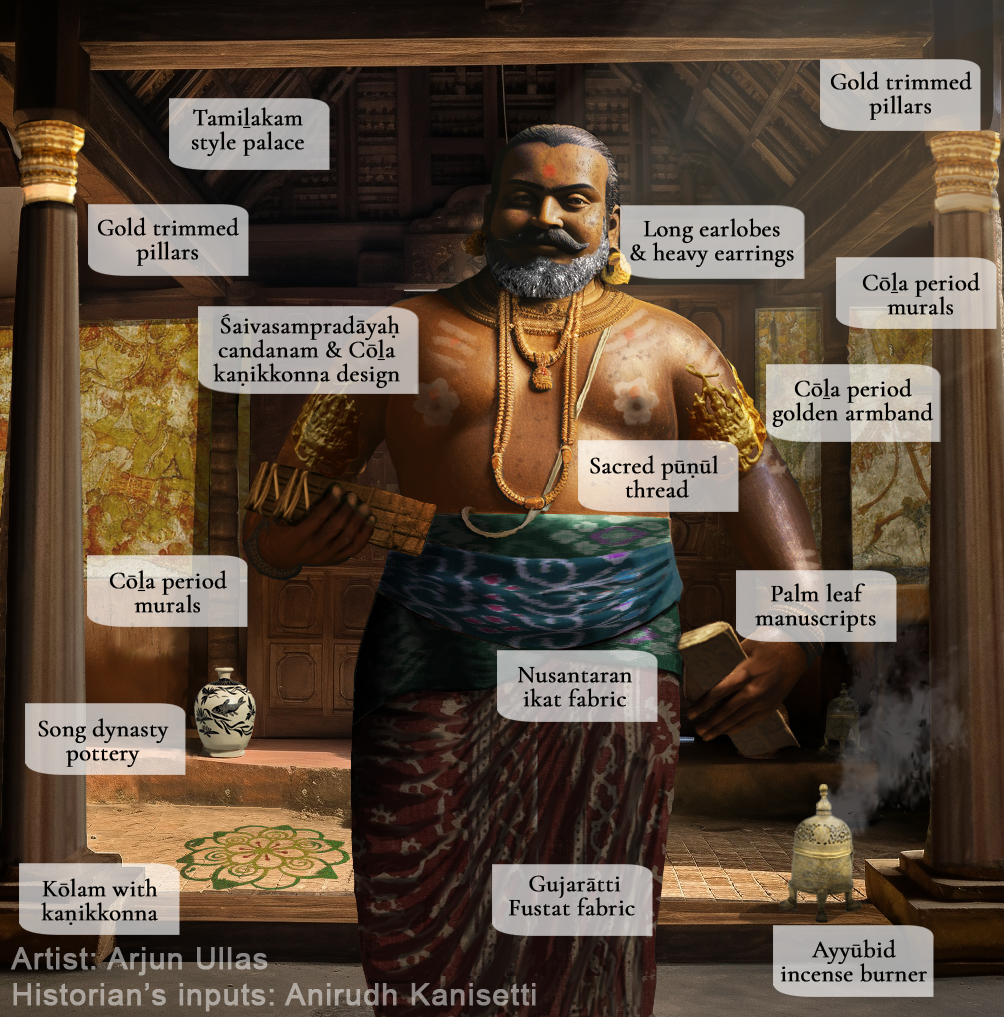
An artistic depiction of Kulothunga Chola with description of all the items. These items are from different parts of the world and shows how globalised the world was. Artist: Arjun Ullas (image posted on Instagram under Connected Histories)

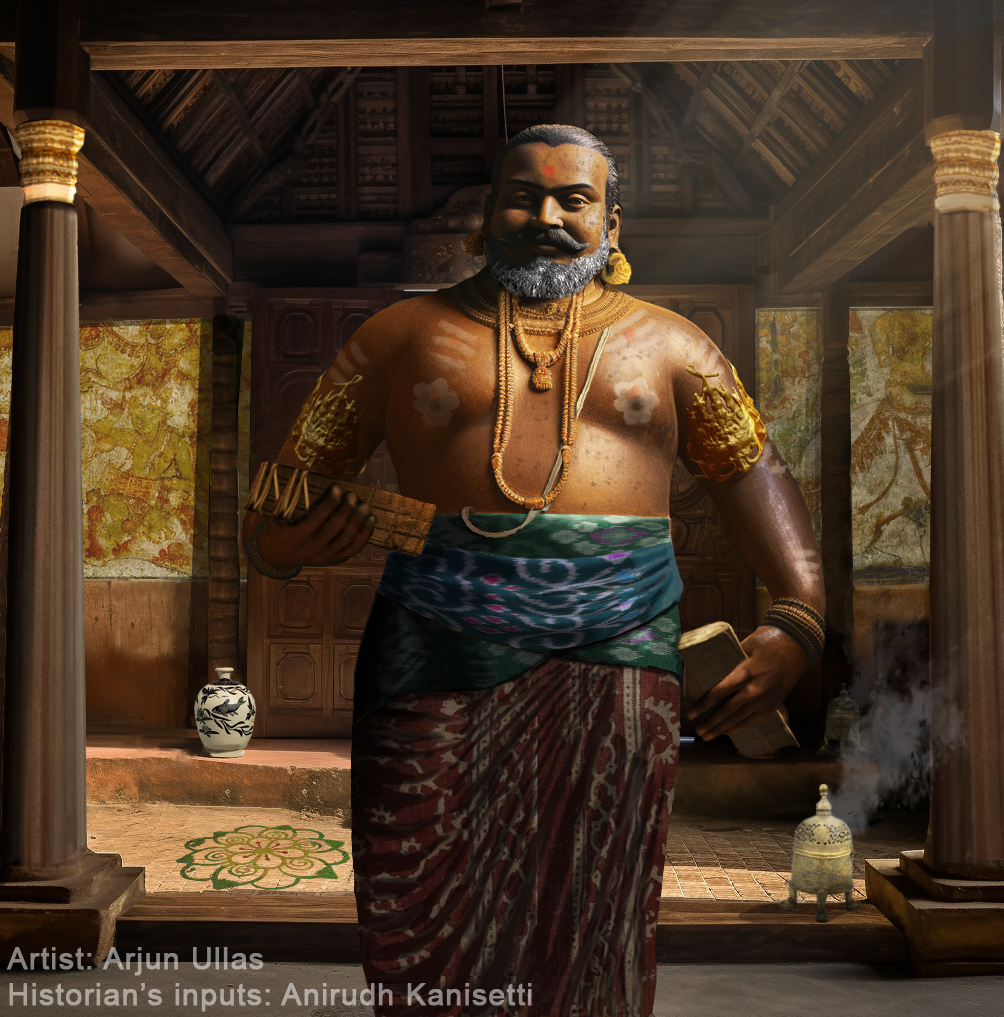
Clearer image without the description of items.

There is also evidence to suggest that Kulottunga, in his youth (1063 CE), was in Sri Vijaya, restoring order and maintaining Chola influence in that area. Virarajendra Chola states in his inscription, dated in the 7th year of his reign, that he conquered Kadaram and gave it back to its king who came and worshiped his feet. These expeditions were led by Kulottunga to help the Sailendra king who had sought the help of Virarajendra Chola. An inscription of Canton mentions Ti-hua-kialo as the ruler of Sri Vijaya. According to historians, this ruler is the same as the Chola ruler Ti-hua-kialo (identified with Kulottunga) mentioned in the Song annals and who sent an embassy to China. According to Tan Yeok Song, the editor of the Sri Vijayan inscription of Canton, Kulottunga stayed in Kadaram after the naval expedition of 1067 and reinstalled its king before returning to South India and ascending the throne.

Trade relations and cultural contacts established during the reigns of Rajaraja Chola I and Rajendra Chola I were actively maintained by Kulottunga and his successors. In 1089, the ruler of Sri Vijaya sent two ambassadors to Kulottunga's court, requesting him to renew the old grants to the Buddhist monastery (Chudamani Vihara) in Nagapattinam that was built during the period of Rajaraja Chola I.

== Extent of the empire ==
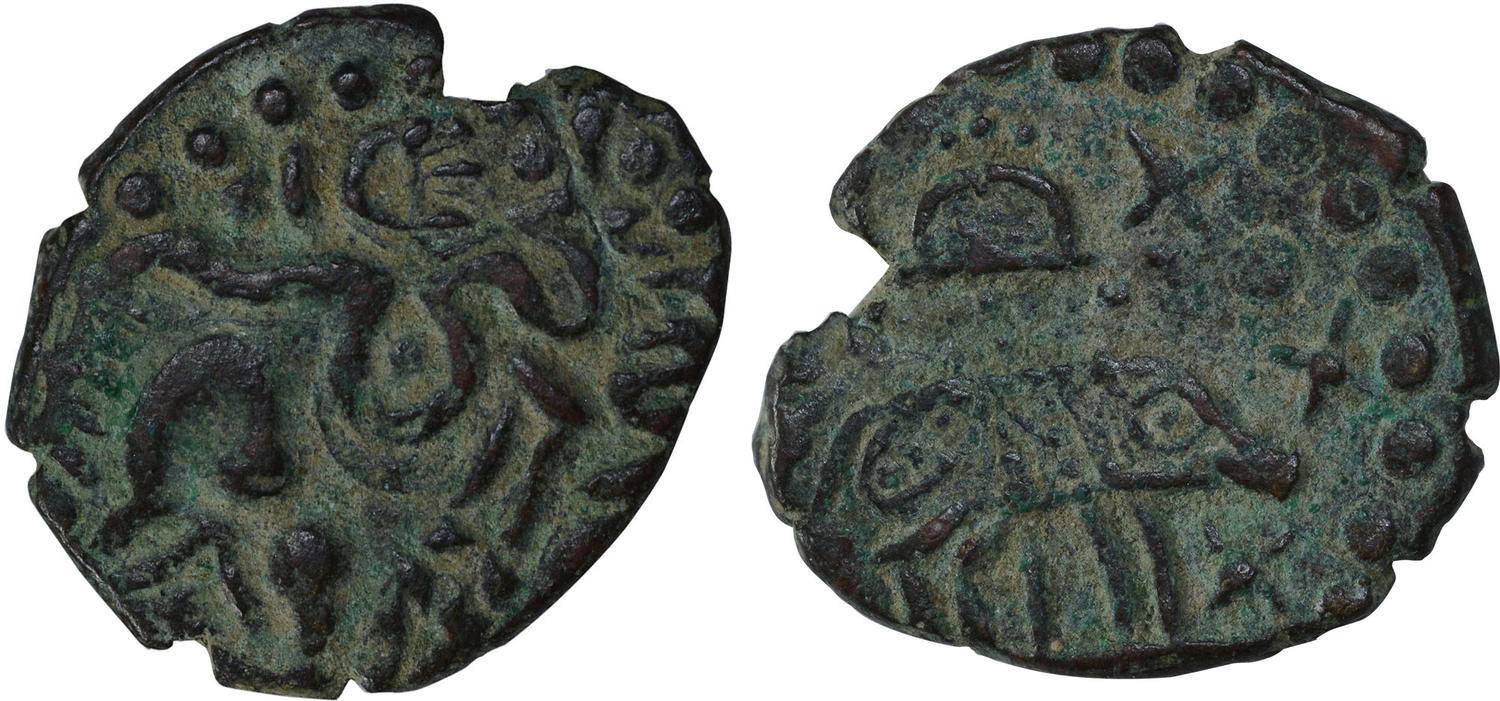
Bronze Kasu of Kulottunga, depicting a boar.

The Chola kingdom remained formidable under Kulottunga in his 45th regnal year (c. 1115 CE). Except for the loose hold over Lanka, the rest of the empire remained intact. The boundary between the Cholas and the Western Chalukyas was Tungabhadra river. The hold over Vengi was quite firm, and Dakkina Kosala (south-west Kalinga) and some parts of Kalinga (proper) including the capital Kalinganagara, the modern Mukhalingam in the Srikakulam district, was under the Chola rule. Port Quilon, on the Malabar Coast, was recovered by prince Vikrama Chola sometime between c. 1102 and c. 1118.

Towards the end of Kulottunga's reign, when his son Vikrama Chola, the viceroy of Vengi left south for the latter's coronation, the northern half of the Vengi kingdom seems to have slipped from his hands and gone to the Western Chalukya empire under Vikramaditya VI. According to some historians, during this period, Kulottunga also lost the province of Gangavadi, the province of the Western Gangas, to Hoysala Vishnuvardhana. The latter seems to have attacked and defeated the Chola Viceroy, Adigaiman, the controller of the Kongu and Kannada country.

== Administration ==
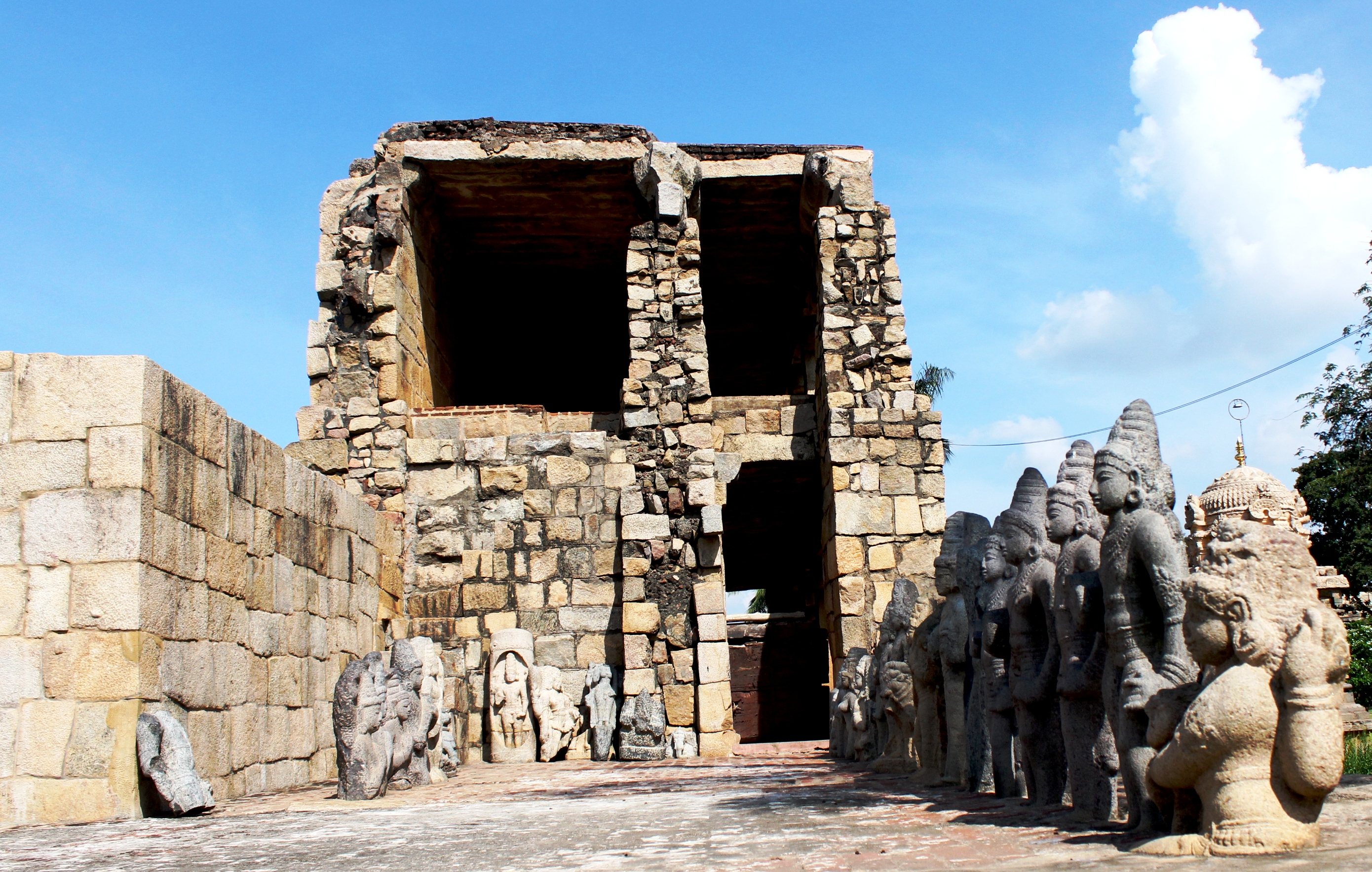
Ruins of the early medieval city of Gangaikonda Cholapuram

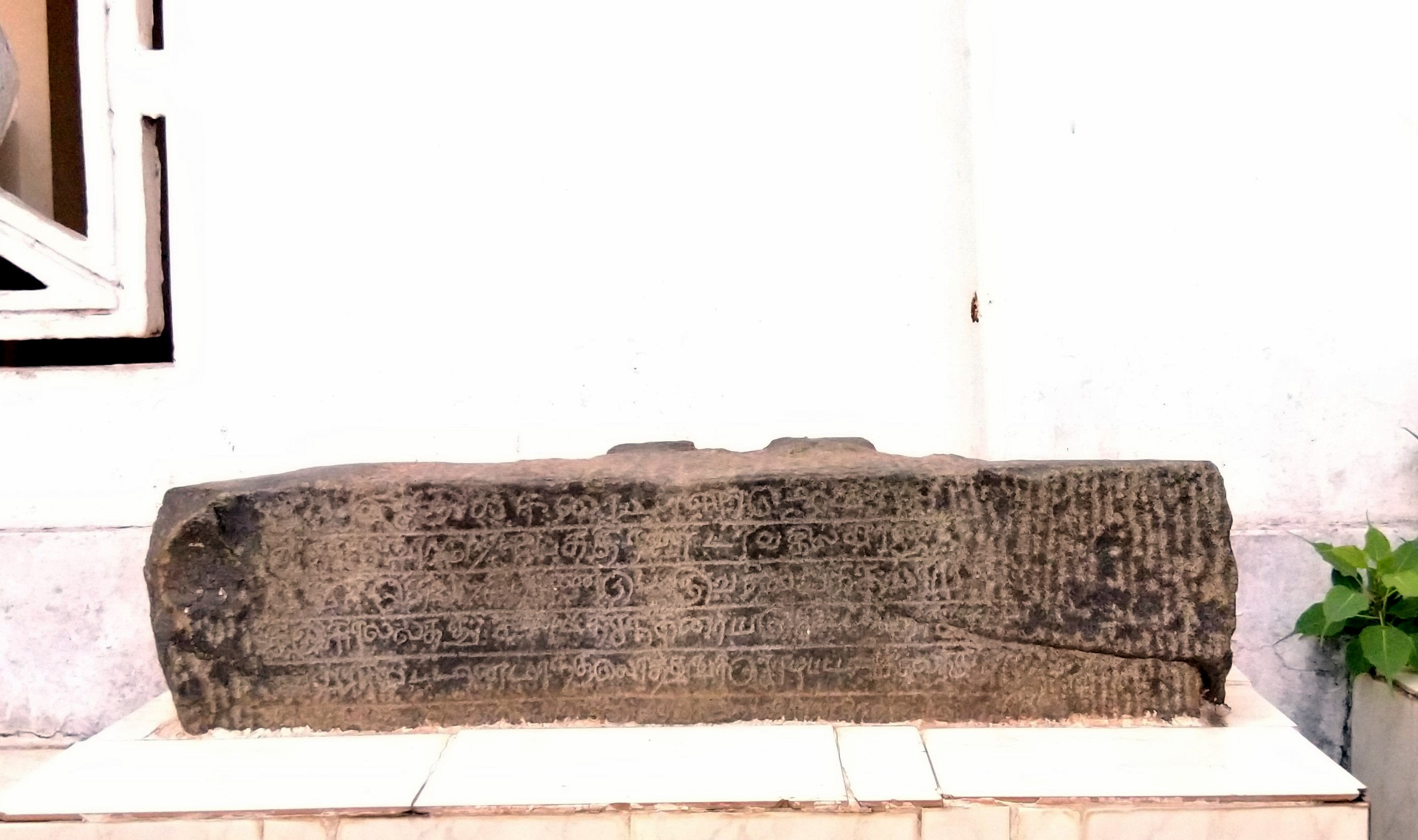
An inscription, dated to c. 1083, proposing the name of Visakhapatnam to be changed to "Kulothunga Cholapatnam."

Kulottunga's capital was Gangaikondacholapuram. Kanchi was next in importance and had a palace and an "abhisheka mandapam" (royal bathing hall) from where the king issued many of his charters. The king's inscriptions speak of a highly organized form of fiscal and local administration. He carried out a massive land survey which formed the basis for taxation. He promoted free trade by abolishing tolls or transit duties and came to be known as "Sungamtavirrton", that is, "one who abolished tolls". Kulottunga did away with the old system of appointing Chola-Pandya viceroys in the southern territories. The king, instead built military cantonments that were in charge of protecting his interests and collecting tribute, but did not interfere with the internal administration of the conquered territories, a responsibility which he left to the native chiefs and feudatories.

Kulottunga was ably assisted in his campaigns and internal administration by his officials some of whom were; Karunakara Tondaiman, described as the minister and warrior of Abhaya; Solakon who distinguished himself in the campaigns in the west against the Kongos, Gangas and Mahrattas; the Brahmin Kannan of great fortress; Vanan (possibly the Bana Vanavaraiyan also called Suttamallan Mudikondan) who is said to be dexterous in the use of his beautiful bow in battle; the general Naralokaviran alias Kalingar-kon who distinguished himself in the Pandya and south Kerala wars; Kadava: Vailava, the lord of Chedi (Malayaman) country; Senapati (General) Anantapala; the Irungovel chieftain, Adavallan Gangaikonda Cholan alias Irungolan; the royal secretary ("Tirumandira-olai"), Arumoli-Vilupparaiyar; and the accountant, Arumoli-Porkari. Gonka I, a vassal from the Velanati Choda family, was greatly responsible for the political stability of the Chola power in the Vengi region. In appreciation of his services, the emperor conferred on Gonka I the lordship over 6000 villages on the southern bank of the Krishna River.

== Family and personal life ==
Family of Kulottunga I

Panchavan Mahadevi	Rajaraja I	Tribhuvana Mahadevi	Shaktivarman I	unknown wife
Araiyan Rajarajan	Rajendra I	Mukkokilan Adigal	Vimaladitya	{{{Kundavai}}}
Rajadhiraja I	Rajendra II	Virarajendra Chola	Arulmolinangai	Amangai Devi	Rajaraja Narendra
Rajaraja Devendravarman	Rajasundari	Athirajendra Chola	Rajendra Kulottunga I	Madhurandhagi
Anantavarman Chodaganga	Rajaraja Chodaganga	Vira Chola	Vikrama Chola

=== Royal House ===
Kulottunga's chief queen was Dinachintamani, others being Elisaivallabhi and Thiyagavalli. Copper-plate grants state that Kulottunga married Madurantaki, the daughter of Rajendradeva of the Solar ra, and had by her seven sons. According to some historians, she is identical with Dinachintamani. She seems to have died sometime before the thirtieth year of Kulottunga. Thiyagavalli took the place of the chief queen upon Dinachintamani's demise. The poem Kalingattupparani mentions Thiyagavalli together with Elisai Vallabhi (also known as Elulagudayal). It also states that Thiyagavalli enjoyed equal authority with the king. Another queen, called Solakulavalliyār, is also mentioned in inscriptions. She was instrumental in renewing the grant of Anaimangalam in favour of the Buddhist Chulamani Vihara at Nagapattinam. He also seems to have married a Pallava princess called Kadavan-Mahadevi. Epigraphs mention three of his sons, Rajaraja Chodaganga, Vira Chola and Vikrama Chola, of which Rajaraja was the eldest. A younger sister of the king is known to us from a very old inscription in the Nataraja temple at Chidambaram. The inscription gives the king three names, namely Kulottunga, Jayadhara and Rajendra. The epigraph states that Rajarajan-Kundavai-Alvar, the younger sister of Kulottunga gilded the Nataraja shrine and gifted a gold vessel, a mirror and made arrangements for the ablutions of the deity (Abishekam). It further states that the king of Kamboja exhibited a stone before the glorious Chola king and by the king's order the stone was placed in front of the main deity of the Nataraja temple. A daughter of Kulottunga I called Ammangai-Alvar and as Periya Nachiyar is known to us from an inscription of Kulottunga Chola III (referred to in the inscription as Virarajendradeva).

== Religious attitude ==
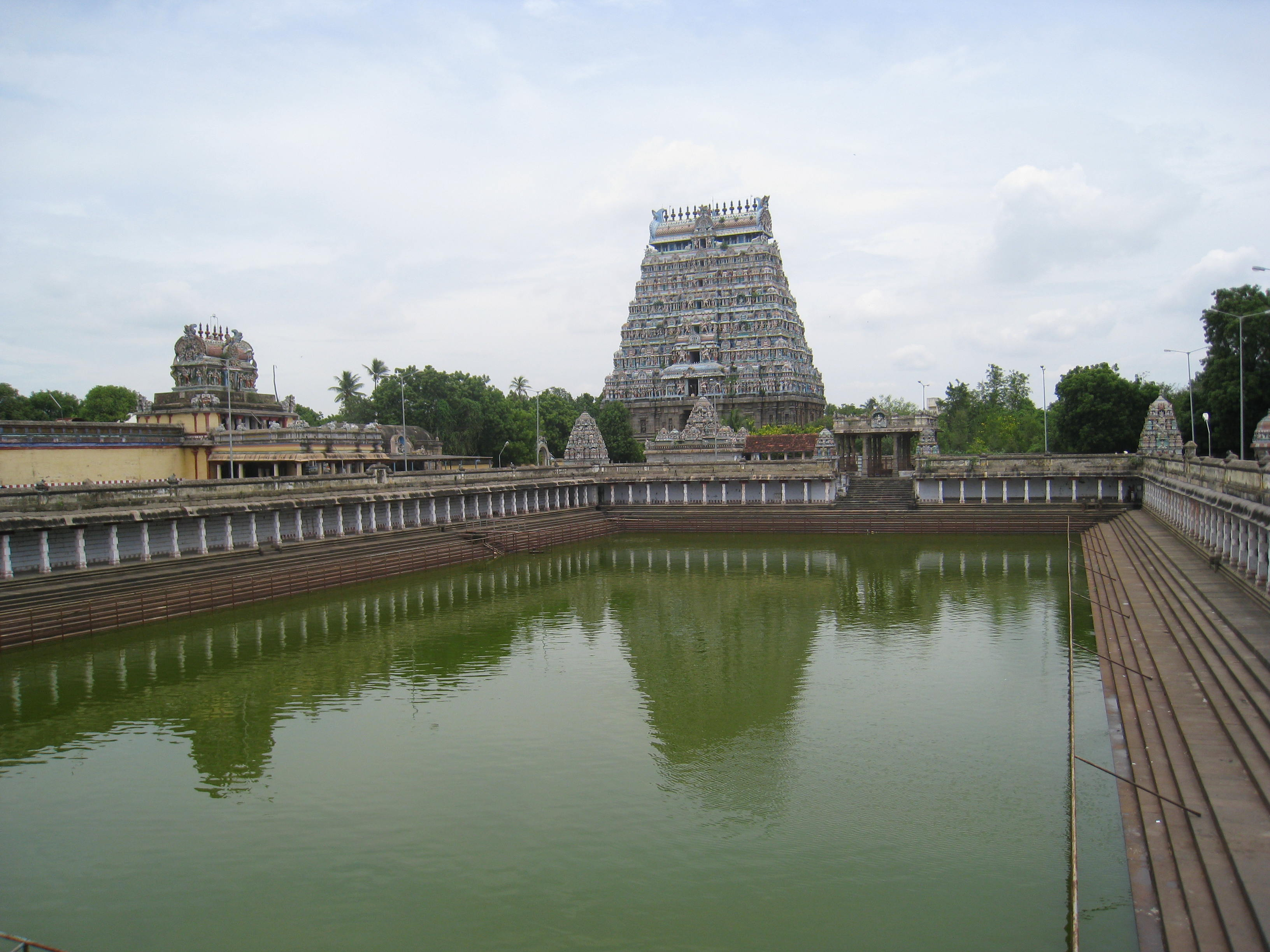
Nataraja Temple in Chidambaram

The empire under Kulottunga encouraged both Shaivism and Vaishnavism. The king and his family members continued to make endowments to the Nataraja Temple in Chidambaram. He was tolerant towards other religions, like Buddhism, and renewed the grants made to the Chudamani Vihara, the Buddhist monastery at Nagapattinam.

Historians dispute the identification of Krimikanta Chola, the persecutor of Vaishnavite acharya Ramanuja, with Kulottunga. One of the reasons for this disagreement is because, Ramanuja is said to have returned to the Chola kingdom from the Hoysala Vishnuvardhana's court after an exile of 12 years (upon the Chola king's death), whereas Kulottunga ruled for 52 years. Some scholars are of the opinion that Kulottunga was secular through his early and middle years and persecuted Vaishnavites towards the end of his reign, succumbing to Shaivite pressure. There is reason to believe that the king encouraged Vaishnavism during the later years as his records mention him giving gifts to the Vishnu shrines. For example, he visited the Ulagalantha Perumal Temple in Kanchipuram with his two queens, Tribhuvanamudaiyal and Solakulavalli, and made benefactions in the 40th year of his reign.

== Art and architecture ==
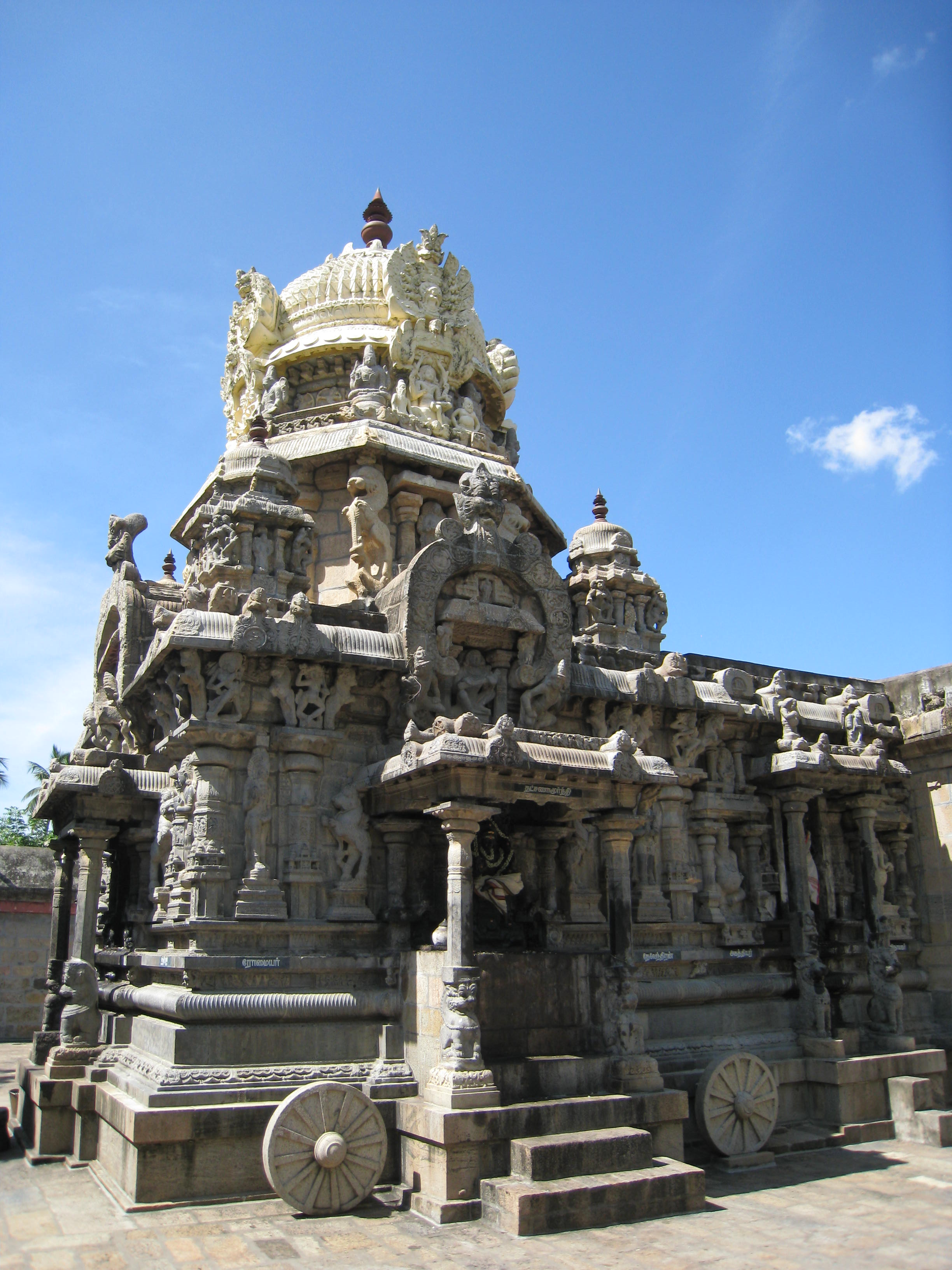
Melakadambur-Karakkoil

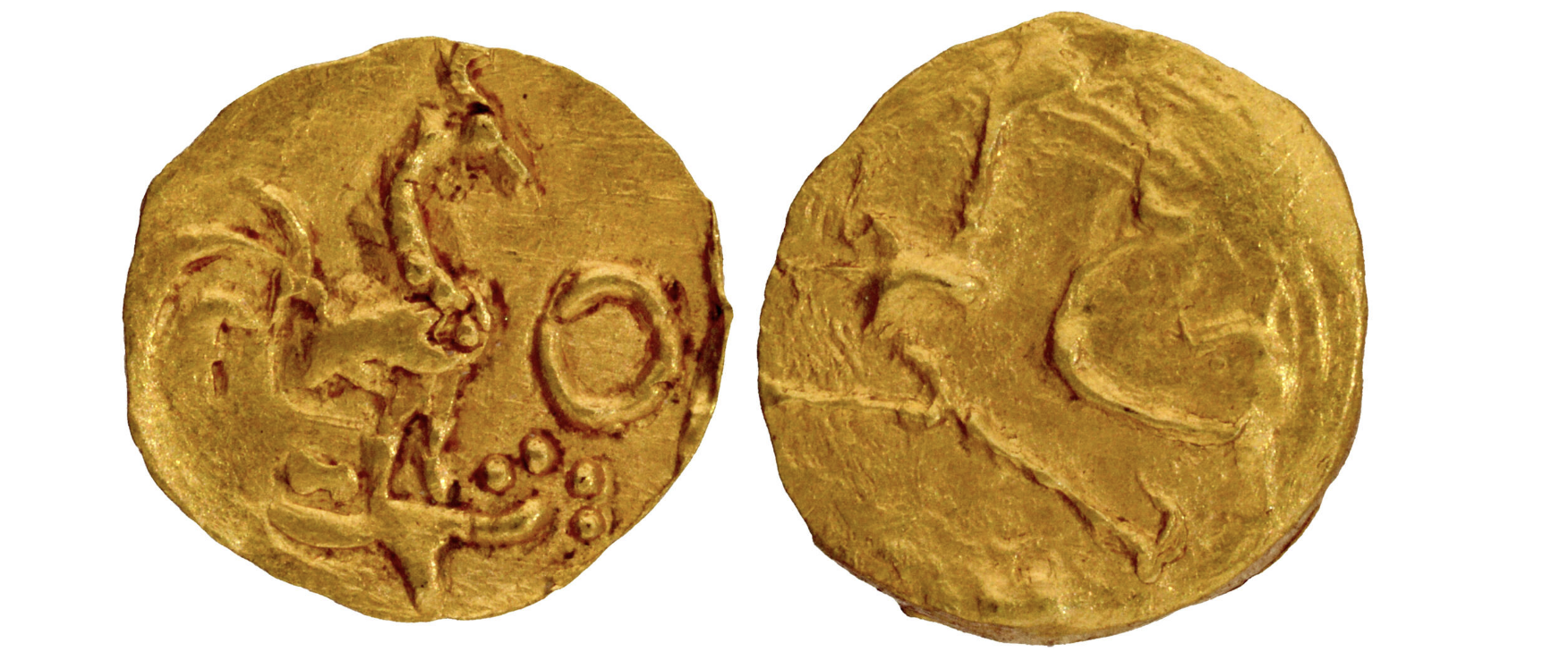
Gold Fanam of Kulottunga I depicts a Rooster. Roosters were rarely depicted in Chola Art

Kulottunga was a patron of arts and architecture. The poet-laureate Jayamkondar is said to have adorned his court. The composition of the famous poem Kalingattuparani is attributed to him. Some scholars consider the poet Kambar to be a contemporary of Kulottunga I and the Ramavataram is said to have been composed during his rule. Others place him during the reign of Kulottunga II or III. Likewise a few believe that Ottakoothar, the author of the three Ulas namely the Kulothunga Cholan Ula, Vikraman Chola Ula and Rajaraja Cholan Ula, lived during his reign while others place him during the reign of his successors viz. Vikrama Chola, Kulottunga II and Rajaraja II. Kulothunga I and his son expanded the Chidambaram Nataraja Temple expanse sixfold.

The construction of the Amritaghateswarar Shiva temple in Melakadambur was also attributed to the reign of Kulothunga. It is called as Karakkoil, and is perhaps the earliest shrine built in the shape of a chariot with wheels, and drawn by spirited horses. The temple contains an inscription of the king, dated in the 43rd year of his reign, corresponding to 1113. During his time, Kulottunga Chozhapuram, now called Thungapuram, was a site of intense religious activity. The streets in the city are laid out like Madurai (square shape), hence it is called as Siru (small) Madurai. Kulottunga constructed two temples in Siru Madurai, one called Sokkanathar temple for Lord Siva, and the other, a Vishnu shrine called Lord Vinava Perumal Temple or Varadaraja perumal temple.

Kulottunga was also on friendly terms with the Gahadavala kings of central India, who had Lord Surya for their tutelary deity. Later, inspired by his visits to the Gahadavala kingdom, Kulottunga built several temples dedicated to the Sun God, especially the Suryanar temples at Pudukkottai and Nagapattinam.

== Inscriptions ==
Kulottunga's inscriptions mostly begin with the introduction "pugal madu vilanga" or "pugal sunda punari". The former gives details about his conquest over Cheras, Pandyas and Vikramaditya VI while the latter is even more detailed and includes the details of his early life, viz., his heroics in Chakrakotta and Vayiragram and how he came about to wear the excellent crown of jewels of the Chola country. An inscription from Kanchi beginning with the introduction "Pugal madu" mentions his birth star as Pushya. Another inscription of the king, from the Tripurantakesvara temple in Chingleput district, mentions the resale of some lands that were bought in the second year of Virarajendra Chola.

In his early years, the king styled himself as Rajakesarivarman alias Rajendracholadeva. We have an inscription of the king from Kolar dated in the second year of his reign. He is called Rajakesarivarman alias Rajendra Chola deva and it mentions his heroics in Sakkarakottam and Vayiragaram. It states that an officer of the king called Virasikhamani Muvendavelar inspected a temple in Kuvalala nadu, a district of Vijayarajendra-mandalam and appointed a committee. There is another inscription from the Brahmapurisvara Temple in Tiruvottiyur, dated in the third year of his reign, wherein he is styled as Rajakesarivarman alias Rajendracholadeva. It states that Muvendavelar, an officer of the king, and a native of Aridayamangalam in Mudichonadu, a sub-division of Kalyanapuramkonda-sola-valanadu, bought some lands and donated them for feeding a Brahmana and a Sivayogin. The names Vijayarajendra-mandalam and Kalyanapuramgonda-sola-valanadu are significant and evidently named after Kulottunga's predecessor, Rajadhiraja Chola I, who sacked the Western Chalukya capital Kalyanapuram towards the end of his reign. Rajadhiraja Chola I then assumed the title Vijayarajendra after performing the "Virabhiseka" (anointment of heroes).

== Bibliography ==
- Spencer, George W. (May 1976). "The Politics of Plunder: The Cholas in Eleventh-Century Ceylon". The Journal of Asian Studies. 35 (3): 405–419. doi:10.2307/2053272. JSTOR 2053272. S2CID 154741845.
- B. Venkataraman (1976). Temple art under the Chola queens. Thomson Press (India), Publication Division.
- K. A. N. Sastri (1937). The Cōḷas. Vol. 2, Part 1. University of Madras.
- —————— (1955). The Cōḷas. University of Madras.
- P. V. Jagadisa Ayyar (1982). South Indian Shrines: Illustrated. Asian Educational Services. ISBN 978-81-206-0151-2.
- Balasubrahmanyam, S. R. (1977). Middle Chola temples: Rajaraja I to Kulottunga I (AD. 985-1070). Oriental Press. ISBN 9789060236079.

Preceded by Athirajendra Chola	Chola; 1070-1122 CE	Succeeded by Vikrama Chola
