= Vikrama Chola =

Chola emperor from 1122 to 1135

Vikrama Chola விக்கிரம சோழன்
- KoParakesarivarman, Tyagasamudra
- Chola Territories c. 1126

Chola Emperor
- Reign: 1122 – 1135
- Predecessor: Kulothunga Chola I
- Successor: Kulothunga Chola II

Co-regent of the Chola Empire
- Reign: 29 June 1118 – 1122
- Died: 1135
- Empress: Mukkōkilānadigal; Tyagapataka
- Issue: Kulothunga Chola II
- House: Chalukya Cholas
- Dynasty: Chola
- Father: Kulothunga Chola I
- Mother: Madhurandhagi

Vikrama Chola, known as Kō Parakēsari Varman, was the Chola emperor from 1122 to 1135. He succeeded his father Kulothunga I (r. 1070–1122) to the throne. Vikrama Chola was crowned as the heir-apparent by his father early in his life. He was appointed as viceroy of the Vengi province in 1089 CE, succeeding his brother Rajaraja Chodaganga. Vikrama during his tenure successfully managed to check the ambitions of the Western Chalukya Vikramaditya VI on the Vengi kingdom. Vikrama Chola inherited the territories which included Tamil Nadu and some parts of Andhra Pradesh.

In 1118, the aging Kulothunga recalled Vikrama Chola from Vengi to the south to appoint him as his co-regent. He assumed many of the titles of his father including Rajakesari when he was a co-regent. He subsequently switched to Parakesari when he ascended the throne. This took place on 29 June 1118. Vikrama continued to rule joinltly with his father until the latter's death in 1122. However the Western Chalukyas, utilising the opportunity of proper leadership in Vengi, invaded and captured the Eastern Chalukyan provinces.

== Early life ==
Vikrama Chola was the fourth son of Kulothunga I. He was a younger brother of Vira Chola, who was the third son of Kulothunga I. The Tamil inscriptions of Vikrama Chola confirm that he left the north for the south (of the Chola kingdom) before he was crowned king.

== Accession ==
Vikrama Chola was crowned as the heir-apparent by his father early in his life. He was appointed as viceroy of the Vengi province in 1089, succeeding his brother Rajaraja Chodaganga. Vikrama during his tenure successfully managed to check the ambitions of the Western Chalukya Vikramaditya VI on the Vengi kingdom.

In 1118, the aging Kulothunga recalled Vikrama Chola from Vengi to the south to appoint him as his co-regent. He assumed many of the titles of his father including Rajakesari when he was a co-regent. He subsequently switched to Parakesari when he ascended the throne. This took place on 29 June 1118. Vikrama continued to rule jointly with his father until the latter's death in 1122. However the Western Chalukyas, utilising the opportunity of proper leadership in Vengi, invaded and captured the Eastern Chalukyan provinces.

== Military campaigns ==
=== Kalinga expedition ===
While he was still a crown prince, Vikrama led an expedition to the Kalinga country on behalf of his father in 1110. The Kalinga war is also referred to in inscriptions and in the epic Vikkiramacholan Ula. Generally, his inscriptions contain the introduction "svasti sri Pū-mādu Punara Puvi-mādu valara Nā-mādu vilanga". An excerpt of a Tamil inscription in the Grantha script from Chintamani, Karnataka, mentions the decimation of Kalinga while he was still a co-regent of his father. The same inscription also mentions the conquest of Kadal Malai, the seaport at the very edge of Mahabalipuram. The inscription describes:

In the 5th of the reign of Kōv-Irajakesarivarman alias the emperor Sri-Vikkirama Sola Deva, who while the goddess of fortune wedded him; while the goddess of the earth increased[in size]; while the goddess of speech became conspicuous; while the goddess of victory moved abroad; while kings placed on their head his sacred lotus-feet; while Kalingam was destroyed;..while his sceptre went and swayed over every region; and while the cruel Kali having disappeared-true virtue flourished..and was graciously seated on the throne of heroes.

He seems to have ascended the throne sometime prior to his 10th year for we have a similar Tamil inscription of his from Srinivaspur, Karnataka that gives him the title Parakesari. The title of his chief queen Mukkōkilānadigal (Queen of the Three Worlds) is also mentioned. We also have the Saka date 1049:

In the 10th year of the reign of Kōpparakēsarivanmar alias the emperor of the three worlds, Sri-Vikkirama Sola Deva, who was graciously seated along with his queen Mukkōkilānadigal-.

=== Recovery of Vengi ===
Vikrama Chola was crowned as the heir-apparent by his father early in his life. He was appointed as viceroy of the Vengi province in 1089, succeeding his brother Rajaraja Chodaganga. Vikrama during his tenure successfully managed to check the ambitions of the Western Chalukya Vikramaditya VI on the Vengi kingdom.

In 1118, the aging Kulothunga recalled Vikrama Chola from Vengi to the south to appoint him as his co-regent. He assumed many of the titles of his father including Rajakesari when he was a co-regent. He subsequently switched to Parakesari when he ascended the throne. This took place on 29 June 1118. Vikrama continued to rule jointly with his father until the latter's death in 1122. However the Western Chalukyas, utilising the opportunity of proper leadership in Vengi, a brief occupation of the Vengi territories between 1118 and 1126, allied with Prince Vikramaditya VI. After Vikramaditya's death in 1126, the Cholas began a slow process of encroachment over Vengi. By 1133 Vikrama Chola was able to re-capture Vengi from Vikramaditya VI's mild son Someshvara III.

=== Recovery of Kerala ===
Corrections by M. G. S. Narayanan (1972) on K. A. Nilakanta Sastri (1955, revised ed.) are employed.

Vikrama Chola also oversaw the Chola recovery of the medieval Chera kingdom (in present-day Kerala) between c. 1102 and c. 1118. It seems that Jatavarman Parakrama, the Pandya, carried out the Kerala campaigns for his Chola overlord. The Cholas captured the Ay country and Venadu (the Kupaka), and defeated and levied tribute from the Chera king. The last Chera ruler of Kerala, Rama Kulashekhara, is fondly remembered by a Chera princess in a record dated in the regnal years of Vikrama Chola from the Thiruvalanjuli temple (1122).

== Personal life ==
Vikrama Chola was a great devotee of Siva and greatly patronised the temple at Chidambaram. In 1128 he signaled his devotion by allocating the entire revenue of the year to the upgrade and extension of the temple. He had the main Vimana of the temple and the roofs of the passages around the main deity covered with gold. He had a palace built near the temple and spent much of his time there. We have many important people making donations to various temples during his reign. The most characteristic title of Vikrama Chola was Tyagasamudra – the ocean of sacrifice, which is found in his inscriptions and in Vikramacholan Ula. We know the titles of three of his queens: Mukkōkilānadigal, Tyagapataka and Neriyan Madeviyar. Of his sons we only know of Kulothunga Chola II who succeeded him on the throne.

== Religious contribution ==
Vikrama Chola built a Siva temple at Ulagalanda Chola Mangalam (now renamed as Kalavai in Vellore district). This temple sivan is suyambu. A nataraja statue was made by pancha-loha, similar to Chithambaram Nataraja statue. Kovil's outer wall was constructed using green stones (patchai kal).

== Officials ==
General Naralokaviran alias Ponnambalakuttan continued to serve Vikrama Chola after Kulottunga I. One of the vassals in the Andhra country was Madhurantaka Pottapi Chola, the son of Siddharasa. The officer claimed descent from the Karikala Chola who raised the banks of Kaveri in epigraphs (Carana saroruha etc.).

== Epigraphs ==
A Tamil inscription of the king from Sidlaghatta district, dated in the second year of his reign and beginning with Pumagal Punara, states that Udayamartanda Brahmamarayan, an officer of the king with his residence in Arulmolideva Chaturvedimangalam, and who was well versed in Tamil, built the temple of Somesvarar in the village of Sugattur in Kaivara nadu. Vikrama Chola is called Pulivendan Koliyar kula Pati alias Rajayyar Vikrama Choladeva.
