= Someshvara III =

King of the Western Chalukya Empire from 1126 to 1138

- Maharajadhiraja; Sarvadnya-bhupa; Bhulokamala
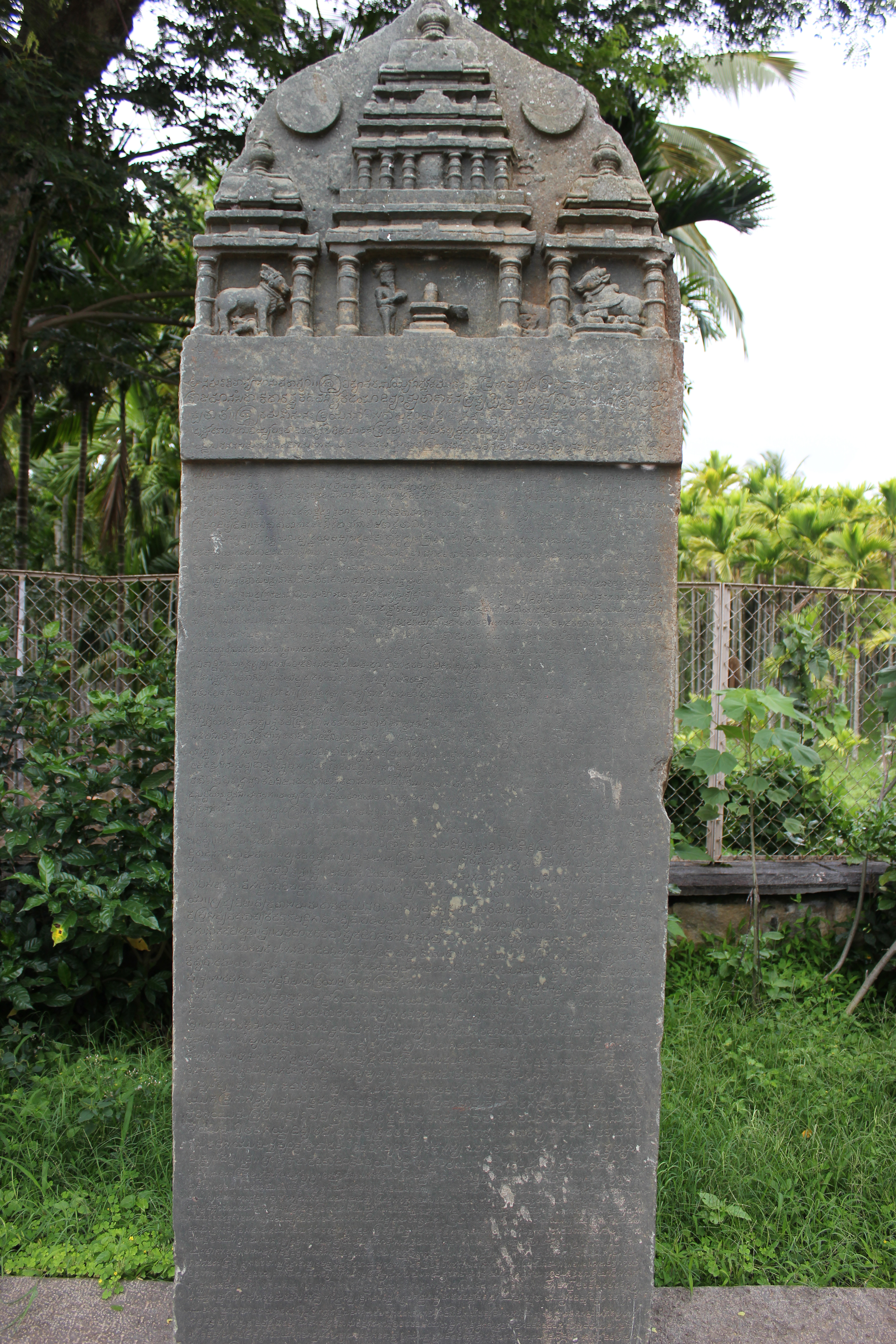

Western Chalukya King
- Reign: c. 5 October 1126 – 1138
- Predecessor: Vikramaditya VI
- Successor: Jagadhekamalla II
- Died: 1138
- House: Chalukya dynasty
- Father: Vikramaditya VI

Someshvara III (IAST: Someśvara; r. 1126–1138) was a Western Chalukya king (also known as the Kalyani Chalukyas), the son and successor of Vikramaditya VI. He ascended the throne of the Western Chalukya Kingdom in 1126, or 1127.

Someshvara III, the third king in this dynasty named after the Hindu god Shiva made numerous land grants to cause of Shaivism and its monastic scholarship. These monasteries in the Indian peninsula became centers of the study of the Vedas and Hindu philosophies such as the Nyaya school. Someshvara III died in 1138, and succeeded by his son Jagadekamalla.

Someshvara was a noted historian, scholar, and poet. He authored the Sanskrit encyclopedic text Manasollasa touching upon such topics as polity, governance, astronomy, astrology, rhetoric, medicine, food, architecture, painting, poetry, dance and music – making his work a valuable modern source of socio-cultural information of the 11th- and 12th-century India. He also authored, in Sanskrit, an incomplete biography of his father Vikramaditya VI, called the Vikramankabhyudaya. His scholarly pursuits was the reason he held such titles as Sarvadnya-bhupa (lit, "the king who knows everything") and Bhulokamala ("the king who is lord of all living beings").

== Military Campaigns ==
Someshvara inherited the empire from his father, Vikramaditya VI when it was at its territorial peak, and during his reign, he was able to maintain the empire to most of its extent, though with a few setbacks.

=== Rebellions ===
Prince Tailapa was one of Someshvara's younger brothers. The former had been governing the Kanduru-nadu province since the reign of their father Vikramaditya VI. The Panugallu-rajya territory in this region was contested among members of the Choda chiefs of Kanduru, who were Chalukya vassals. After the death of the Choda chief Udaya I, Gokarna probably succeeded him on the throne of Panugallu. It appears that differences developed between Gokarna and other members of the Choda family—Gokarna's elder brother Bhima III and Bhima's nephew Shridevi-Tondaya—who rebelled against the suzerainty of the Chalukyas. In 1128 CE, Bhima III killed Gokarna, with the support of the Chalukya general (damdesha) Govinda. Meanwhile, Tailapa seems to have indirectly encouraged the rebellion against his brother Someshvara III, and possibly divided Panugallu-rajya between Shridevi-Tondaya and Govinda.

Historian P. V. P. Sastry identifies Govinda with the governor of Komdapalli-sima, who was a nephew of Anantapala danda-nayaka. M. Somasekhara Sharma identified him with Govinda, the son of Bagi Madimayya nayaka (an officer of Vengi), but Sastry notes that no historical records attest this person’s presence in the Telangana region at the time.

Someshvara seems to have dispatched his Kakatiya feudatory, Prola II, against the rebels. Sometime during 1130–1136 CE, Prola reinstated Udaya II, the son of Gokarna I, as the ruler of Panugallu-rajya. After the death of Prola II, his son Rudra defeated Bhima.

=== Wars with the Cholas ===
Someshvara continued his father's wars against the Cholas, but was always on the defensive. This could probably be attributed to the nature of their reigns- Vikramaditya VI was an expansionist ruler who wanted to grow his domain's size, while Someshvara could not do the same for the realm he had inherited was too large to grow.

Someshvara suffered setbacks against the son of his father's rival Kulottunga I, Vikrama Chola, who momentarily reconquered Vengi. However, according to the Jainad inscription of his feudatory, Jagaddeva, the latter:

- Defeated the king of Andhra. Historian H. V. Trivedi believes that this refers to the Chola king Rajaraja II, and Someshvara with Jagaddeva may have led a Chalukya invasion against the Chola occupation of Andhra territory.

Hence, it is likely that Someshvara recovered Vengi from the Cholas.

=== Battles with the Hoysalas ===
During the reign of his father, Vikramaditya VI, the Hoysalas whom were feudatories of the Western Chalukyas, under Vishnuvardhana continuously rebelled against Western Chalukya rule, but was defeated by Vikramaditya's feudatory commander, Achiugi, and forced back into submission.

During Someshvara III's reign, the Hoysalas under Vishnuvardhana staged another rebellion, which Someshvara defeated and successfully suppressed.

== The Manasollasa ==
Someshvara III is credited with composing Mānasollāsa (Sanskrit: मानसोल्लास) (meaning "the refresher of the mind") or the Abhilaṣitārtha Cintāmaṇi (the magical stone that fulfills desires). It is an encyclopedic work in Sanskrit. The treatise deals with a wide range of topics (100 topics), which include the approach to acquire a kingdom, methods of establishing it and royal enjoyment. It contains valuable information regarding Indian art, architecture, cuisine, ornaments, sports, music and dance. It includes recipes for the king's favorite dishes including several types of rice, vegetables, meats and various sweets. In addition to milk based sweets it includes recipes for fried sweets like golamu, pantua and gharika.

== The Vikramankabhyudaya ==
Vikramankabhyudaya, a text found in 1925, is a historical document written by Someshvara III, in the form of a biography of his father. The first chapter provides a detailed description of the geography and people of Karnataka, the second chapter explains the grandeur of Kalyan, the capital city of the Western Chalukya Empire. The long third chapter pertains to the history of the Chalukyas starting with a legendary story ending with the sixteenth year of Someshvara III's father, Vikramaditya VI reign when the latter began his war of victory, "Digvijaya". However, the last chapter is incomplete as it terminates abruptly as: "The Brahmanas and the ladies on that day...."
