= Chelluru =

- village
- Interactive map of Chelluru
- Location in Andhra Pradesh, India Chelluru (India)
- Coordinates: 16°49′10.486″N 81°59′55.401″E
- Country: India
- State: Andhra Pradesh
- District: East Godavari district

Population (2001)
  - Total: 11,062

Languages
  - Official: Telugu
- Time zone: UTC+5:30 (IST)
- 533261: 533261
- Vehicle registration: AP 05, AP06

Chelluru is a village in Rayavaram Mandal in East Godavari district of Andhra Pradesh, India.
