= Naralokaviran =

12th century general in the Chola army

- Allegiance: Chola Empire
- Conflicts: Pandya Wars; Chera Rebellion

Naralokaviran, also known by the title Kalinga Rayan, was a general in the Chola army during the reign of Kulothunga I (1070 – 1120) and his successor Vikrama Chola (1118 – 1135). He led many Chola campaigns in the deep south and distinguished himself in the Pandya Wars. He had many titles such as "Madurantaka Ponnambala-koothar", "Sabharnataka", "Kalinga Rayan", "Porkoyil-Thondaiman", "Koothan", "Thondaiyarkon", and the "Lion of Kalinga".

Naralokaviran is also known for subduing the rebelling medieval Chera king of Kerala for his Chola overlord. The port of Quilon was recovered by the Pandya-Chola forces in c. 1097 AD. However, the Cheras were able to recover Quilon-Trivandrum-Nagercoil region around 1100/02 AD (and thus "fixing the southern limit of the country at Kottar"). These losses were later (c. 1102 - c. 1118) recovered by Jatavarman Parakrama Pandya for Vikrama Chola.

== Family and residence ==
Naralokaviran was the headman of Arumbakkam and a resident of Manavil in Manavil Nadu in Thondai Mandalam. He maintained a large fief at Manavil. Naralokaviran came from the influential class of landholders known as the Vellalar (Vēḷān kuḍi Mudalān). A son of Naralokaviran called Surainayakan alias Madhavarayan is known from inscriptions. He, too, served as an officer under Vikrama Chola.

== Religious contributions ==
Naralokaviran is known for a number of benefactions to Nataraja Temple in Chidambaram. He was responsible for the construction of two large temple gateways and for the expansion of the goddess shrine within the temple complex. He took interest in festivals and made contributions for the provision of lamps on the processional routes, watering the streets during the festivals, a bull vehicle for the deity to ride during the Bhikshatana procession and a bugle inlaid with gold to herald the arrival of god Shiva. During the reign of Vikrama Chola, Naralokaviran built the "hundred-pillar hall" and named it after his overlord ("Vikrama Chola").

== Inscriptions ==
Naralokaviran figures in many inscriptions of Kulothunga I (1070 – 1120) and his successor Vikrama Chola (1118 – 1135)

- Earliest reference: An inscription dated to of the 28th regnal year of Kulothunga I (1098 AD) (begins with the phrase "Pugal madu") from Neyvanai in South Arcot district states that some lands were renamed as Sungamtavirtta-sola-nallur (after the Chola king) and were donated to Porkudangudutta-aruliyadeva at Thirunelvennai upon request by Naralokaviran.
- Naralokaviran continued to serve Kulothunga's successor Vikrama Chola (1118 – 1135) as well. He figures in an inscription of the 4th regnal year of Vikrama Chola (begins with the phrase "Pumadu Punara") from Thiruvarur [that states that Naralokaviran bought some lands from the sabha of Thirunallur; for providing garlands of red lilies to the Sri-mulasthanam Udaiyar (god) of Thiruvarur].
- Latest reference: Another inscription of the 6th regnal year of Vikrama Chola (also begins with the phrase "Pumadu Punara") from Thribhuvani (Pondicherry) states that Naralokaviran set up some land for a temple site, a hall and a flower garden and dedicated it to Arulakara-Iswaram Udaiyar for the prosperity of the Chola king and the village.

He is the subject of a bilingual metrical composition in Sanskrit and Tamil, an excerpt as follows:

'The koothan with the lance, who brought the whole earth under the shade of the umbrella of his overlord is our chief, the chief of the people of Manavil.'

== See also ==
- Karunakara Tondaiman
- Chola
- Tondaiman
