= Kollam Pillar Inscription =

Quilon Inscription of Kollam 278
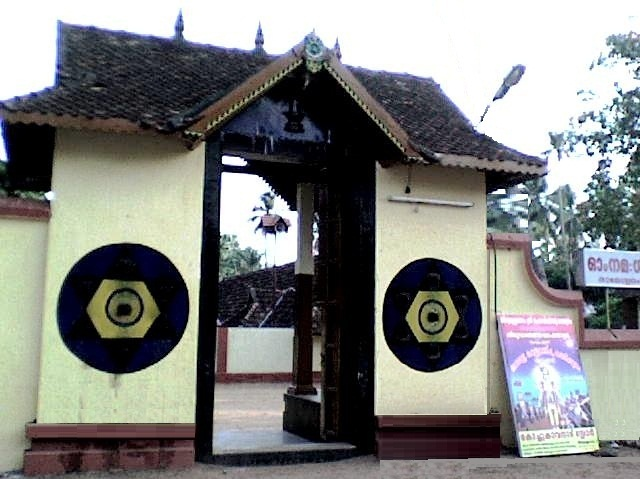
- Kollam Rameswaram Temple
- Material: Granite
- Writing: Malayalam
- Created: c.1102 CE; Kerala
- Present location: Kollam Rameswaram Temple

Kollam Rameswaram temple inscription, also known as Quilon Inscription of Kollam 278, is a medieval Chera inscription associated with the short-lived recovery of the port of Kollam (Quilon) on the Malabar Coast from the imperial Cholas.

The royal order is dated to c.1102 CE, during the reign of Chera ruler Rama Kulasekhara, and is inscribed in Vattezhuthu (with necessary Grantha) in the Malayalam language at the Rameswaram Mahadeva Temple in Kollam. The inscription portrays Kulasekhara as publicly making atonement for "offences" committed against the Brahmins, an exceptional act for a reigning Chera ruler of Kerala. The record is also notable for confirming the sovereign authority of the Chera ruler over Kerala, as it mentions his samanthas, such as the ruler of Eranadu, among those present at Kollam.

The record was probably issued in the aftermath of the violent recovery of the port of Kollam from the imperial Cholas. It is generally regarded as the last medieval Chera inscription from Kerala.

== Description ==
The inscription is engraved on all four sides of a granite pillar erected in the courtyard of the Rameswaram Mahadeva Temple and comprises a total of 151 visible lines. The record is dated to Kollam Era 278 when Jupiter was in Kanni, possibly in the month of Chingam (9th day; expired). It is also dated to the 13th (2+11) regnal year of Rama Kulasekhara (= c.1102 CE; fl. c. 1089/90 – c.1122/23 AD).

swasti śṛi I

kollantoṉṛi-yirunūṛṛeḻupatteṭṭām-āṇṭai-kkaṉṉiyil viyāḻam pukka [ciṅṅa ñā]yiṛu oṉpatu ceṉṛa nāḷ iraṇṭām-āṇṭaikketir pati[norā]m āṇṭai[y

i]rāmar tiruvaṭi koyilatikārikaḷ-āyiṉa śṛi kulacekara-ccakkiravarttikaḷ kurakkēṇi-kkollattu paṉaiṅkāviṉ koyilakattirunnaruḷa

=== Council held at Kollam ===
Rama Kulasekhara is described in the record as "Rama Thiruvadi Koyil Adhikarikal" alias "Kulasekhara Chakravarthikal". The inscription's use of the title "Chakravarthikal" indicates that Kulasekhara claimed independent royal authority. According to the record, he was residing and issuing orders from Panainkavu Kovilakam in "Kurakkeni" Kollam.

The inscription states that Kulasekhara was seated in council with the Arya Brahmins, the Four Brahmin Ministers (the Nalu Thali), the Leader of the Thousand Nairs (the Ayiram), the Leader of the Six Hundred Nairs of Venadu (the Arunutruvar), Mana Vikrama "Punthuraikkon", the ruler of Eranadu — who is notably described therein as "the foremost among the samanthas" — and other feudatory rulers (the samanthars).

āriyaroṭu vanna virotattiṉu vrāyaccit-ttattiṉu putten paṛaiyāl patiṉāḻi-kkoḷḷum paṛaiyāl niyatam oro-parai-cceytu nel irāmeccuvarattu...āriya brāhmaṇaruṅkūṭi-yirunnaṭattu...pakkal....yakkaṅkaiyil-ttirukkai naṉaicaruḷa

nāṉku taḷiyum āyi[ram a]ṛunūṛṛuvarum eṛāṉaṭu vāḻkkai māṉavikkiramaṉ-āṉa pūntuṛaikkōṉ mutalāyuḷḷa cāmantarun tirukkaikkiḻ-kkūṭiyirukka-ttirukkai naṉaicc-a[ru]ḷiyāvitu I

=== Public atonement ===
According to the record, Kulasekhara publicly made amends (the prayaschitham or public atonement) for an "offence" committed against the Aryas (Brahmins) by donating paddy for the daily feeding of Brahmins and by leasing Crown Land (the Cherikkal) to Kumara Udaya Varma, the ruler of Venadu, for that purpose (the tenant).

The king also made provision for Koothu (the Dance) and offerings at Thirukkunavaya (Jain) temple.

accerikkal kārāṇmai ceta veṇāṭṭu kumāraṉ-utaiya vāmmaṉ...i...

ainnāḻikoḷḷum-iṭaṅkaḻiyāl muppattaru kala nelli rāmecurattu maṇṭapattil [kūttaṅ]kūṭi-yirunnatil i[vvāṇṭu] mutal tiru...vaikkum tirukkūttuṅkūṭi-cce[lvatu] I

kiṛṛaṭiccuvarattu meloṭitti...lu cennel muppattaṛu-kalam...lippaṭi-patiṉeṇkalam nellāl celaviṭuvitu I

vaiccanel patiṉaiṅkalattāl toḷḷāyira-nāḻi palākkāṭṭu kaṇṇan tevaṉ celaviṭuvitu I

toḷḷāyira-nāḻi mel ivvur cattipiramañ celaviṭuvitu I

celavu muṭṭikiṉṛe...mayālaññāḻi ari taṇṭapattu celaviṭuvitu I

kārāḷar mūvaruṅkūṭi cerikkal...kārāḷarum tirukkuṇavāttevar tirunaṭaiyil koṇṭu munnāḻikku‐okkum-iṭa[ṅ]kaḻi nānūṛṛu nāḻi nelāṭṭai kārāḷaru cerikkal koṭuppatu I

yivaṇṇ-a[m]maiccamaikku...kuṇavāyiraṉum yikkaṭai-kaṭamaiyāl...tiṉṛumaticcu okku...ṉṛunāḻi-uriyāl...

yirunāḻi akkiram patiṉāḻi ipperumāḷ naṭai cilaviṛku avaṛṛiṛku nāḻuri kiṛṛaṭiccurattu moloṭikku nāḻuri...koṭuktu...

=== Witnesses ===
The witnesses to the grant are listed at the end of the record.

ka...ṉṛa maṅṅalatt-iraviyirāyāṉ kaiyeḻuttu I

...ṉa...lakkaluṅyum...

micā-naṅkai-yāṭiyār āṛikku...ccṉeḻuttu I

araicūr ācāri kaiyeḻuttu I

tirupperūr maṛaikka...kaṇṭāccaaṉ kaiyeḻuttu

śṛi II
