= Rayavaram, East Godavari district =

Rayavaram Indira colony
- Village
- Interactive map of Rayavaram
- Location in Andhra Pradesh, India Rayavaram (India)
- Coordinates: 16.905°N 82.001°E
- Country: India
- State: Andhra Pradesh
- District: East Godavari
- Talukas: Rayavaram, East Godavari district

Population (2011)
  - Total: 4,149

Languages
  - Official: Telugu
- Time zone: UTC+5:30 (IST)
- PIN: 533346
- Telephone code: 08857
- Vehicle Registration: AP05 (Former); AP39 (from 30 January 2019)

Rayavaram is a village and a mandal headquarters in East Godavari district in the state of Andhra Pradesh in India.

== Villages ==
- Chelluru
- Kurakallapalle
- Kurmapuram
- Lolla
- Machavaram
- Nadurubada
- Pasalapudi
- Rayavaram
- Someswaram
- V.savaram
- Vedurupaka
- Venturu
