= Poonguzhali =

Fictional character from Ponniyin Selvan

Poonguzhali is a fictional character from the Tamil historical novel, Ponniyin Selvan, written by Kalki Krishnamurthy. Poonguzhali is the niece of Mandakini Devi. She was the wife of Senthan Amuthan, who later became Uttama Chola. Their marriage made Poonguzhali the aunt of Arulmozhi Varman. She was a friend of Vallavaraiyan Vandiyadevan, who was one of the protagonists in the novel. Aishwarya Lekshmi portrayed the character in PS-1 and PS-2.

== Early life ==
Poonguzhali was born in Ariyalur.

== Adventures ==
Her adventures began when she met Vallavaraiyan Vandiyadevan. She rowed with him to Sri Lanka to meet Arunmozhi varman. Later on the way back from Sri Lanka, she rescued Arulmozhi Varman and Vallavarayan Vandhiyathevan from drowning in the Indian Ocean, as their ship met with a storm. Afterwards, she tries to save her aunt, Mandakini Devi, who was kidnapped by Aniruddha Brahmarayar, to bring her to the Chola Emperor, Sundara Chola.

== Royal throne ==
Poonguzhali married Senthan Amuthan, later known as Madhurandhaka Uttama Chola. After the assassination of Aditha Karikalan or Aditya II, people wanted Arulmozhi Varman to ascend the throne.

== See also ==
- Ponniyin Selvan
- Ponniyin Selvan: I
- Ponniyin Selvan: II
