= Production of Ponniyin Selvan: I and Ponniyin Selvan: II =

Ponniyin Selvan: I and Ponniyin Selvan: II are Indian Tamil-language epic historical action drama films directed by Mani Ratnam, who co-wrote them with Elango Kumaravel and B. Jeyamohan. Produced by Ratnam and Subaskaran Allirajah under Madras Talkies and Lyca Productions, they are the cinematic adaptations of Kalki Krishnamurthy's 1955 novel, Ponniyin Selvan.

Ever since its publication, a film adaptation of the novel had been explored by several Tamil filmmakers, including an attempt by M. G. Ramachandran in the late 1950s; however, it never materialised. Decades later, Ratnam attempted to adapt the novel in the late-1980s and early-2010s but was unsuccessful due to financial constraints. Calling it his "dream project", Ratnam revived the effort in January 2019, after Lyca agreed to fund the film. Following several changes in cast and crew, production of Ponniyin Selvan began on 11 December 2019 and concluded in 18 September 2021, halting twice due to the COVID-19 pandemic. It was originally intended to be a single film but was split into two parts. Both parts were shot back-to-back in various locations across India, with a few sequences in Thailand.

Ponniyin Selvan: I was released in theatres worldwide on 30 September 2022 and Ponniyin Selvan: II was released in theatres on 28 April 2023.

== Origin ==
In 1958, M. G. Ramachandran announced Ponniyin Selvan, a film adaptation of Kalki Krishnamurthy's historical novel of the same name. Ramachandran bought the film rights to the novel for ₹10,000 (equivalent to ₹1.0 million or US$11,000 in 2026), and would produce, direct and star in the adaptation, which would feature an ensemble cast including Vyjayanthimala, Gemini Ganesan, Padmini, Savitri, B. Saroja Devi, M. N. Rajam, T. S. Balaiah, M. N. Nambiar, O. A. K. Thevar and V. Nagayya. Before shooting could begin, Ramachandran met with an accident, and the wound took six months to heal; Ramachandran was unable to continue with the film even after renewing the rights four years later.

In the late 1980s, actor Kamal Haasan and Mani Ratnam worked together on adapting the novel into a film. Composer Ilaiyaraaja and cinematographer P. C. Sreeram became attached to the project, while actors including Sathyaraj and Prabhu were cast in pivotal roles. Ratnam revealed that he worked on a first draft of the film alongside Kamal Haasan, who had bought the rights of the novel from Ramachandran, but the pair shelved their plan as the project did not make financial sense at the time. In an interview with Filmfare in January 1994, Ratnam stated that it remained one of his "dream projects" and that he had hoped to work on during his career. Kamal Haasan then attempted to make the story into a forty-part television series, and worked with writer Ra. Ki. Rangarajan on the screenplay, but the project was later stalled. After the financial failure of his Iruvar (1997), Ratnam was dissuaded by his wife Suhasini from making a film based on Ponniyin Selvan due to her belief that Tamil audiences would not accept films based on history.

In late 2010, Ratnam renewed his interest in the project and worked alongside writer Jeyamohan to finalise the script for the film adaptation of Ponniyin Selvan. Expected to be made in the Tamil at a cost of ₹100 crore (US$10 million), Ratnam planned to produce the film himself initially, with the intention of teaming up with a bigger production house later on in the filmmaking process. Technicians including composer A. R. Rahman, cinematographer Santosh Sivan, editor A. Sreekar Prasad and art director Sabu Cyril were soon after attached to the project.

Ratnam cast Vijay in the leading role of Vallavaraiyan Vandiyadevan. After signing the film, Vijay called it a "privilege" and a "dream come true" to be working with Ratnam for the second time after Nerrukku Ner (1997). Mahesh Babu was cast as Arulmozhi Varman, who later becomes the Chola emperor Rajaraja I in the project, and also expressed his delight at being selected by Ratnam. Arya also joined the project to play a third leading male role after the script was narrated to him. Meanwhile, Sathyaraj was signed to play a supporting role in the film. During the course of the casting process, Ratnam had also considered other actors including Vikram, Suriya and Vishal but they eventually did not make the final cast. For the leading female roles, after considering Jyothika, the team finalised Anushka Shetty for a role and held discussions with Priyanka Chopra in regard to other characters.

Seven days before the scheduled start of the shoot, a photoshoot for the film was held in Chennai featuring Vijay and Mahesh Babu. For the shoot, the team sought permission from the officials of Mysore Palace and Lalitha Mahal to film sequences. However, their requests were denied with palace officials keen to keep film crews away from the historic locations. The film was later shelved before the start of the filming stage, as the expected cost of production escalated. Jeyamohan stated that the film did not materialise as the team struggled to find available locations to shoot the film. He revealed that temple officials in Tamil Nadu refused to allow the team to film scenes on the premises and that the expensive cost of producing replica sets meant that it would not be a viable solution.

== Development ==
In January 2019, Ratnam decided to revive Ponniyin Selvan after Lyca Productions, who earlier collaborated with him in Chekka Chivantha Vaanam (2018), agreed to fund the film. While Vikram, Vijay Sethupathi and Jayam Ravi decided to play the lead roles, along with Silambarasan in a crucial role, Amitabh Bachchan and Aishwarya Rai Bachchan too assigned the project; the former playing the role of Sundara Chola in the film. Composer A. R. Rahman, screenwriter Jeyamohan and editor Sreekar Prasad, were retained in the new version. In April 2019, a major change in the film's cast took place, with Sethupathi opting out of the project due to schedule conflicts, thus being replaced by Karthi, and Anushka Shetty was included in the film's cast, working with Ratnam for the first time. Rai later herself confirmed her inclusion in the project, at the Cannes Film Festival. Anushka Shetty, who was part of the film's old version, officially signed the project. Vikram, who is one of the principal characters in the film, too confirmed his part. Veteran actors R. Parthiban and Jayaram were also reported to join the film's cast. Rajinikanth wanted to portray Periya Pazhuvettaraiyar, but Ratnam refused since it would upset the actor's fans; the role went to Sarathkumar.

In June 2019, Elango Kumaravel announced that he would co-write the screenplay for this version with Ratnam and Jeyamohan. Ratnam decided to retain cinematographer Santhosh Sivan for this project. However, his unavailability made the director to sign on Ravi Varman. Varman, was working for Indian 2, directed by S. Shankar, before signing the film's project. But the latter's delay made Varman to quit the film, making him available for Ponniyin Selvan. In September 2019, Ratnam confirmed that he will be working with the composer and lyricist duo Rahman and Vairamuthu, who were a part of Ratnam's frequent collaborations since Roja (1992). However, it received huge displeasure from netizens, as the latter was accused of sexual misconduct and harassment by several women singers and artists from the Tamil film industry. This also resulted in Anushka Shetty opting out of the project. Art director Thota Tharani signed the new version of the project. Costume designer Eka Lakhani travelled to Thanjavur temples to study sculptures, meet weavers, and understand the heritage before starting the process of designing.

== Pre-production ==
Ratnam announced that the film's shoot would take place across Tamil Nadu and Thailand, and as per his advice, several actors from the film including Vikram, Jayam Ravi, Karthi grew their hair long for their roles in the film. In October 2019, Ashwin Kakumanu announced his inclusion in the project. Actor Lal shared a picture of him along with Ratnam, raising expectations about the film. He further confirmed his inclusion, stating that he will play the role of an aged warrior in the film. Prior to the film's shoot, Ratnam went on a location recce across Thailand, and a few reports stated on choosing Thailand as the primary spot, since its rich forests and the temples there resemble the 10th-century feel in which the story is set. Although discussions were held with both Amala Paul and Keerthy Suresh for the role of Poonguzhali, neither of them signed the film. While the former stated call sheet issues as the reason, the latter cited she was chosen for Annaatthe. In 2019, Trisha was signed to replace Anushka to play the Chola princess Kundavai Pirāttiyār and thereby marking her second collaboration with Ratnam after Aayutha Ezhuthu (2004). Ratnam modelled Trisha after the former actress and politician J. Jayalalithaa for his depiction of Kundavai. A few addition in the film's cast took place, with Aishwarya Lekshmi and Vikram Prabhu were reportedly signed in the film.

== Characters ==
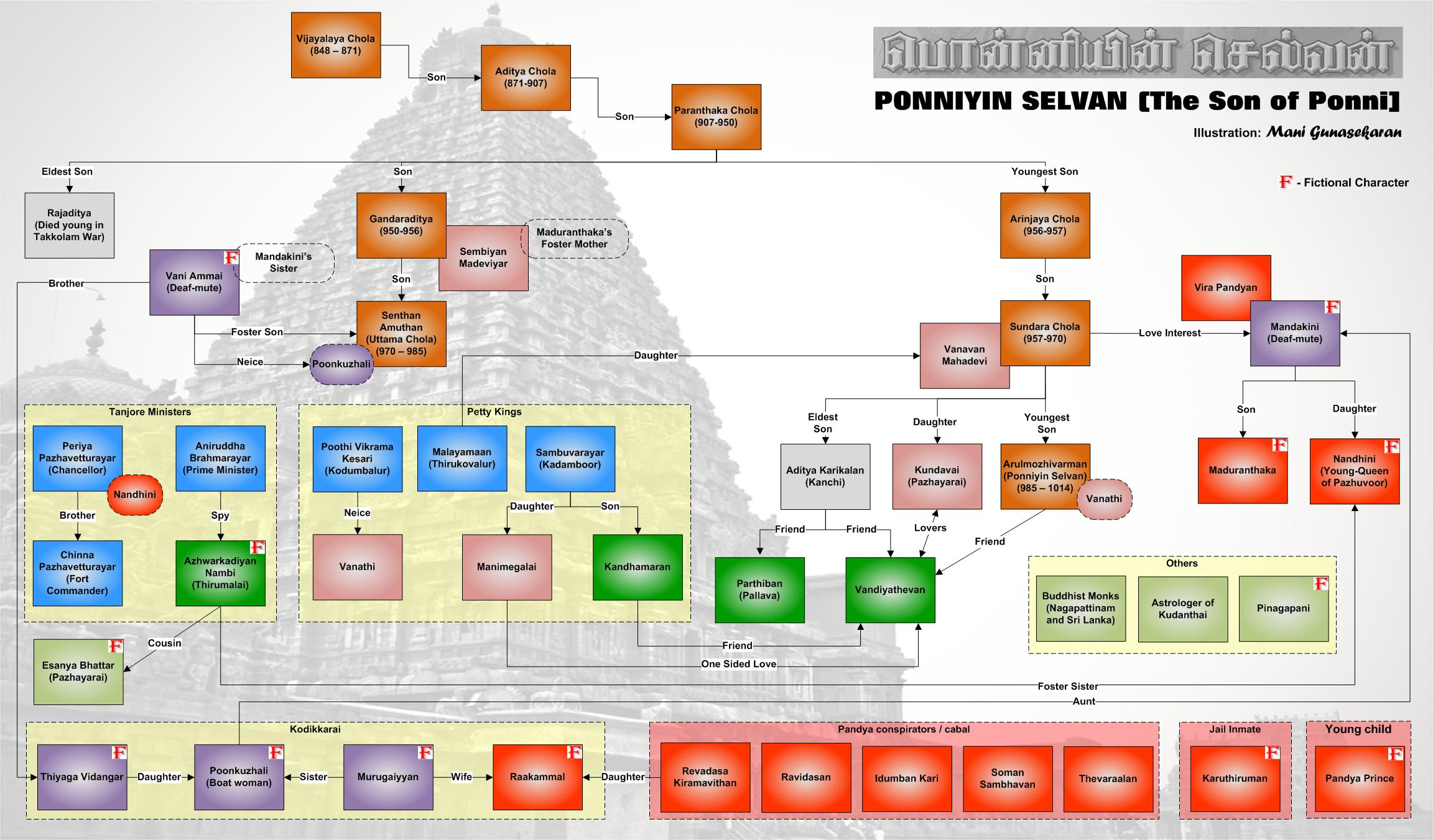
Chart of characters involved in Ponniyin Selvan

The story thread of Ponniyin Selvan spans years and more than 50 characters, with 15 principal roles. The older version of Ratnam's film adaptation had Vijay playing Vallavaraiyan Vandiyadevan one of the two protagonists and Mahesh Babu playing the other protagonist role of Arulmozhivarman alias Rajaraja I alias Ponniyin Selvan, after whom the novel is named. After the project was revived, the roles went to Karthi and Jayam Ravi respectively. It was later reported that Rai will play dual roles in the film, as Nandini, the main antagonist of the novel, and her mute mother, queen Mandakini Devi. For his role as Azhwarkadiyan Nambi, Jayaram sported a bald look in the film. Trisha would play the role of Kundavai alias Illaiya Piratti. For the role of Poonguzhali, Aishwarya Lekshmi learnt rowing, as the character Poonguzhali is a boat woman in the novel. Post shooting being suspended due to lockdown, Trisha trained in horse-riding at the Madras School of Equitation during October–November 2020. Both Jayam Ravi and Karthi, confirmed their characters playing in the film.

== Filming ==
=== Budget ===
Ponniyin Selvan was originally planned as a single film with a budget of ₹500 crore (US$52 million). Later, it was split into two parts that were to be shot back-to-back, with some sources reporting that ₹500 crore budget was spread across two parts.

=== Principal photography ===
Principal photography began on 11 December 2019 at Krabi, Kanchanaburi and other places in Thailand, where the crew planned its shooting schedule for 40 days. After completing the first schedule in January 2020, the team planned to shoot the second schedule in Chennai, but later moved to Puducherry. The second schedule of shooting took place on 3 February in Puducherry, and completed within six days. The team then moved to Hyderabad for the next schedule, on 10 February, where the entire team planned to shoot at Ramoji Film City. The second schedule was wrapped up on 26 February. It was reported that, Karthi faced an accident while he was shooting in Hyderabad, where he was thrown up in the air, while riding a horse, however he faced only minor injuries. As of March 2020, the makers shot the major portion of the film for 90 days before shooting being interrupted due to the COVID-19 pandemic. In January 2020, it was reported that the film would be split into two parts, which was confirmed by Mani Ratnam in April 2020.

In September 2020, Ratnam eventually planned to resume the shooting at Sri Lanka, but due to restrictions on international travel, it was difficult for the team to get permission from the officials to resume filming, and therefore decided to shoot major portions of the film in India. Ratnam wanted to shoot major portions in Hyderabad, Jaisalmer, Jaipur, Madhya Pradesh and many prominent locations across India. Although the team eventually planned for filming in mid-November, he decided against doing so, lamenting that despite government permitting film shootings, it was advised that the film's shooting must have minimal crew members, with not more than 75 people working on the film. Ratnam stated that since 500 people will be featured in the film's shoot, it is difficult for shooting in mid-2020. On 10 December, a minor schedule of the film took place in Pollachi, featuring the lead actors. The team stated that the major schedule of the film will take place in January 2021, and was touted to be the biggest schedule, which will be wrapped up in a single stretch. Vikram was reported to be present in the schedule, after completing the shoot for Cobra (2022). After a nine-month long hiatus, the shooting for the film resumed on 6 January 2021 at Ramoji Film City, Hyderabad. The major schedule featured the attendance of Sarathkumar, Rai, Trisha, Rahman, Prakash Raj, Parthiban and Mohan Raman.

On 3 February 2021, the makers shot for a special number featuring Trisha and 250 other artists at a huge set constructed at Ramoji Film City. The art direction team, supervised by Thotta Tharani, had constructed five huge sets in the shooting location. According to the executive producer Siva Ananth, the lead cast members began shooting for the portions in Hyderabad, excluding Vikram, who earlier shot for the portions in January, and was reported to join the sets in between a brief break during the schedule. After filming for a schedule ended in March, the next schedule was to start in May; by 23 April, it was delayed to June due to a spike in COVID-19 cases. Plans to shoot in North Indian states during that time was changed to instead shoot in Chennai and Hyderabad. In mid-June 2021, it was announced that shooting would only resume once there were fewer COVID-19 cases.

Filming resumed in July 2021 at Puducherry. In August, the team went to Madhya Pradesh for location scouting, so that they can shoot the pending portions, and later resumed the shoot in Orchha and Gwalior. By late-August, Jayam Ravi and Vikram had completed their portions for both the parts in the film. The team then moved to Maheshwar for another schedule which majorly focuses on Karthi and Trisha. On 4 September, Rahman confirmed that he completed his portions. The team had begun shooting in Pollachi for a song sequence, in the middle of the month. The team moved to Pollachi and then to Mysore to shoot some sequences. It was reported that Karthi joined shooting in Pollachi and Ashwin Kakamanu joined shooting in Mysore. Karthi finished shooting for his portions on 16 September 2021. On 18 September, Ratnam confirmed that the entire shooting of the first part has been wrapped, except for few sequences in the second part. In March 2022, Jayam Ravi and Karthi shot a small patchwork in Mumbai. The remaining patchwork of the second part was shot in January 2023.

== Post-production ==
=== Dubbing ===
Dubbing works started on 27 September 2021. Vikram dubbed for himself for five languages, in Tamil, Hindi, Telugu, Malayalam and Kannada, but only in the trailer. Both Jayam Ravi and Karthi dubbed for the Tamil and the Telugu versions of the film, with the latter also dubbing in Hindi.

=== Editing ===
Scenes removed from the film during the editing stage included the "Sol" song featuring Trisha and Sobhita Dhulipala, as well as sequences featuring Vijay Yesudas and Kathadi Ramamurthy, who portrayed Kudandai Josiyar.

=== Music ===
The film score and soundtrack for both films were composed by Mani Ratnam's regular collaborator A. R. Rahman. The audio rights of the film were purchased by Tips.

== Lawsuits ==
In September 2021, the Animal Welfare Board of India (AWBI) filed a lawsuit against Mani Ratnam in connection with the death of a horse allegedly during the film's shooting in Hyderabad in August 2021. An official from the People for the Ethical Treatment of Animals (PETA) India, complained to the local officials against Ratnam, his production house Madras Talkies and the owner of the horse under the Prevention of Cruelty to Animals (PCA) Act and Indian Penal Code (IPC), saying that several horses were continuously used for hours at the film set due to which the animals were tired and dehydrated. Khushboo Gupta, the Indian Chief Advocatory Officer from PETA raised objections against Mani Ratnam saying that "In the age of computer-generated imagery (CGI), production companies have no excuse for forcing exhausted horses to play at war until one of them drops dead" and felt that "Compassionate, forward-thinking filmmakers would never dream of hauling sensitive animals to a chaotic movie set and forcing them to 'act'".

== See also ==
- Back-to-back film production
