= Vallavaraiyan Vandiyadevan =

Commander of the Chola Empire

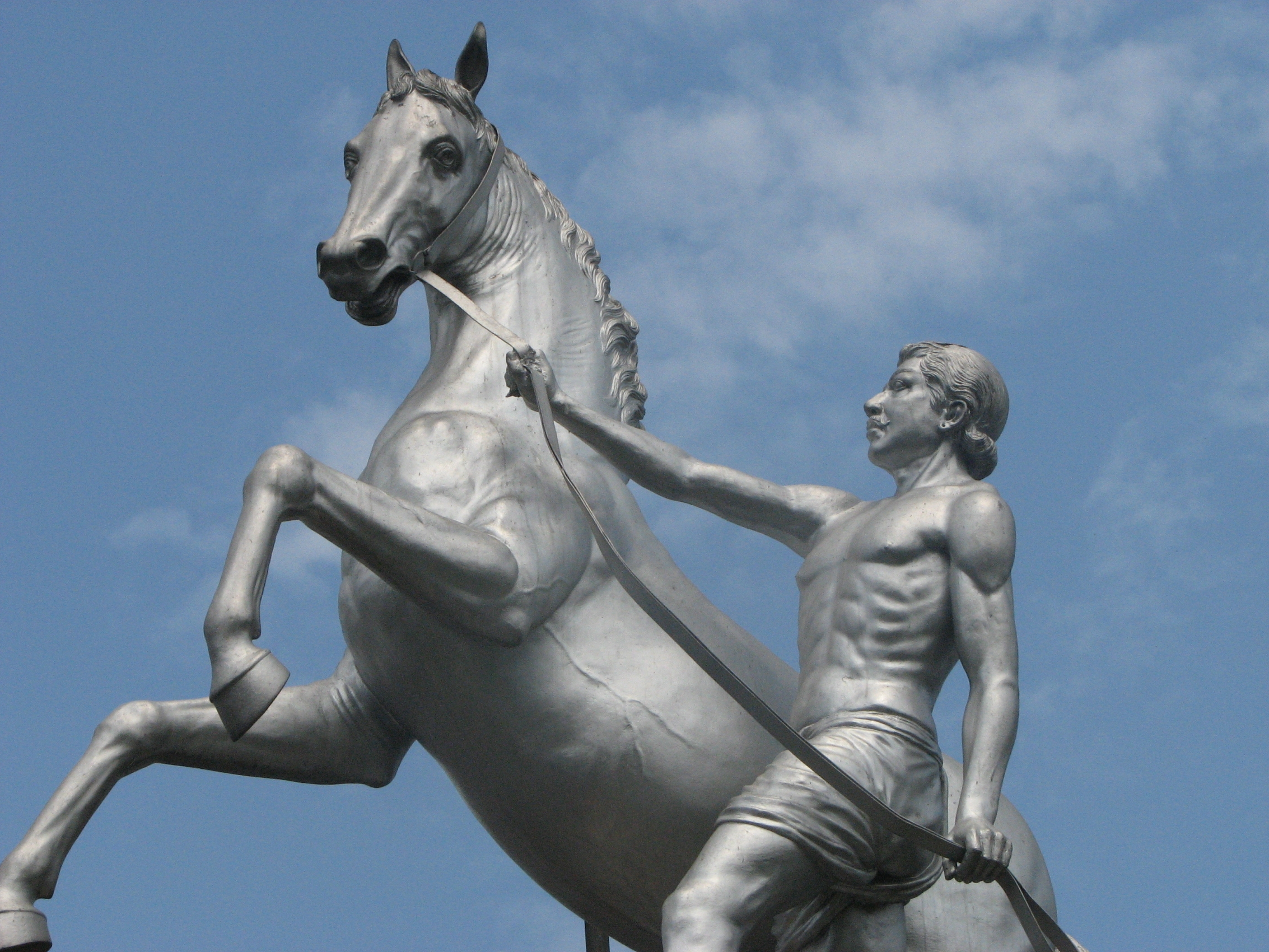
- Equestrian statue of Vallavaraiyan Vandiyadevan in Chennai.

Chola Chieftain of the Samanthas
- Emperor: Rajaraja I Rajendra I

Chola Chieftain of Brahmadesam
- Emperor: Rajaraja I Rajendra I
- Born: Thiruvallam / Vallam, Chola Empire (modern day Thiruvalam, Tamil Nadu, India)
- Died: Thanjavur, Chola Empire (modern day Tamil Nadu, India)
- Spouse: Kundavai Pirāttiyār
- Dynasty: Bana dynasty
- Military career
- Service: Chola Army
- Rank: Senathipathi
- Commands: Eelam; Southern troops
- Religion: Hinduism

Vallavaraiyan Vandiyadevan was a general of the Chola Army. He was one among the famous chieftains of the Chola emperors Rajaraja I and Rajendra I and chief of the Samanthas of Chittoor and also the husband of Rajaraja's elder sister Kunthavai Pirattiyar. He was also the chieftain of the Sri Lanka Front Army of Rajaraja l and Rajendra I. Territory under his authority was known as Vallavaraiyanadu. He ruled Brahmadesam. Vandiyathevan is idealized in Kalki Krishnamurthy's (Kalki) famous novel Ponniyin Selvan and also in many other novels like Vandiyadevan Vaal, Vandiyadevan Senai Thalaivan Vengai in Maidan.

== Origins ==
His origins and clan are subjects of great debate. Kalki Krishnamurthy strongly believed his clan is Vaanar Kulam (Bana kingdom / Magadai Mandalam) and depicted the same in his famous novel Ponniyin Selvan.

== Evidences ==
He is referred to in the Rajarajeshwaram Temple inscription in which he is referred to as the husband of Kundavai Pirāttiyār.

== In popular culture ==
Vandhiyadevan is one of the key characters of the novel Ponniyin Selvan. The author Kalki Krishnamurthy depicts him as a brave, adventurous and sarcastic warrior/prince, who later becomes the Commander for Southern Troops under the reign of Uttama Chola. He was a bodyguard and close friend of Aditha Karikalan in Kanchi who sends him as a messenger to Parantaka II in Thanjavur to invite him to the newly built golden palace in Kanchi and also as a trustful guard for Kundavai in Pazhayarai. His unplanned and hasteful acts put himself and others in danger but comes out of them by trickery and luck. He is the lover of Princess Kundavai. He is loved one-sidedly by Manimekalai, the sister of Kandamaran. The author introduces most of the characters to the audience through him.

A life sized statue depicting Vallavaraiyan controlling a horse was erected in Chennai during the first tenure of Mr. Karunanidhi as Chief Minister, near Gemini Flyover in Mount Road as an honour to Vallavaraiyan. Interestingly, this also coincided with the banning of horse races by the government of Tamil Nadu.

Karthi portrayed a fictionalised version of Vandiyathevan in the 2022 Tamil film Ponniyin Selvan I and subsequent sequel Ponniyin Selvan II, a 2-part adaptation of Kalki's novel of the same name.

== See also ==
- Ponniyin Selvan
- Ponniyin Selvan: I
