= Tirunallam Umamaheswarar Temple =

Hindu Temple

Coordinates: 11.0069°N 79.5808°E

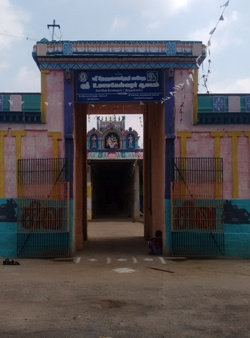
Main entrance

Tirunallam Umamaheswarar Temple is a Hindu temple located in Konerirajapuram, in the Mayiladuthurai district of Tamil Nadu, India. The presiding deity is Shiva, known here as Umamaheswarar. His consort is Degasoundari.

== History ==
The temple was rebuilt in stone during the 10th century CE under the patronage of Queen Sembiyan Mahadevi, the widow of Chola king Gandaraditya and mother of Uttama Chola. Sembiyan Mahadevi is renowned for her extensive role in reconstructing brick temples into durable granite structures and promoting Shaiva devotion across the Chola domain. Inscriptions at the site indicate endowments by her and her descendants. The temple is also notable for housing one of the largest Chola bronze sculptures of Nataraja, reflecting the artistic and religious revival of the period.

== Significance ==
It is one of the 275 Paadal Petra Sthalams—Shiva Sthalams—glorified in the early medieval Tevaram poems by Tamil Saivite Nayanar saints Tirunavukkarasar and Thirugnana Sambandar.

== Architecture ==
The temple follows the typical Dravidian architectural layout. The main entrance (rajagopuram) leads to a mandapa with a flagpost (dwajasthambam), balipeeta, and Nandi mandapa. On either side of the entrance are shrines dedicated to Ganesha and Murugan. The sanctum sanctorum houses the lingam representing Umamaheswarar, flanked by Dvarapalas (guardian deities). The goddess shrine, facing east, is located to the right of the main shrine. The koshta (outer wall niches) contains finely carved miniature sculptures, and the temple ceiling features murals depicting episodes from temple lore and festival scenes.

== Iconography ==
The temple is particularly famed for its colossal bronze image of Nataraja (Shiva as the cosmic dancer), considered one of the largest and finest Chola bronzes still in existence. The bronze reflects the iconographic precision and spiritual energy characteristic of Chola metal sculpture. Numerous other metal and stone icons, dating to the same period, are preserved in the temple.

== Worship and Festivals ==
The temple follows the Shaiva Agama tradition, with regular daily rituals and annual festivals. Major celebrations include Maha Shivaratri and temple processions of the bronze Nataraja icon. The temple remains an active center of worship and is managed by the Tamil Nadu Hindu Religious and Charitable Endowments Department.
