= Kundavai Pirāttiyār =

10th century Indian princess

Kundavai
- Princess of Tanjore
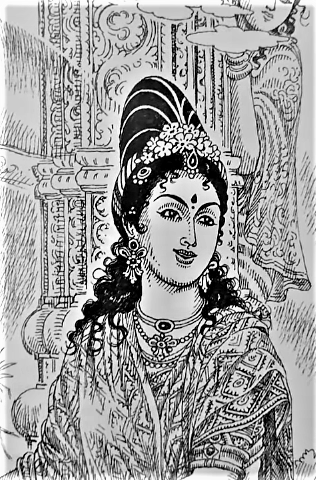
- Kundavai as portrayed in Kalki's Ponniyin Selvan.
- Born: Ālvār Sri Parāntakan Sri Kundavai Nachiyar; 945 CE; Tirukoilur, Chola Empire (modern-day Tamil Nadu, India)
- Died: Pazhaiyarai, Chola Empire (modern-day Tamil Nadu, India)
- Spouse: Vallavaraiyan Vandiyadevan
- Dynasty: Chola (by birth); Bana (by marriage)
- Father: Parantaka II
- Mother: Vanavan Mahadevi
- Religion: Hinduism (Shaivism sect)

Kundavai Pirattiyar, commonly known mononymously as Kundavai, was a Chola Indian princess who lived in the tenth century in South India. She was the daughter of Parantaka II and Vanavan Mahadevi. She was born in Tirukoilur and was the elder sister of Chola emperor Rajaraja I. She had title as Ilaiyapirātti Kundavai Nachiyar.

However, when her husband Vallavaraiyan Vandiyadevan was crowned king in his hometown Bana kingdom, she did not accept the offer to become queen of the kingdom and remained as the princess of Tanjore.

== Life ==
Kundavai (also transliterated as Kundhavai or Kunthavai) was born in 945 CE. She was the only daughter of the Chola king Parantaka II and queen Vanavan Mahadevi. She had an elder brother – Aditha Chola II, and a younger brother – Raja Raja Chola I.

Kundavai married Vallavaraiyan Vandiyadevan, a member of the Bana dynasty, a feudatory of the Cholas mentioned in the Tanjore inscriptions. He was also the commander of the Chola infantry that fought in Sri Lanka in the days of Rajaraja l. The territory under his authority was known as 'Vallavaraiyanadu', and occasionally 'Brahmadesam'.

Along with her great-aunt Sembiyan Mahadevi, Kundavai brought up her nephew, Rajendra I, who was the son of Rajaraja I and Thiripuvana Madeviyar, princess of Kodumbalur. Rajendra I spent most of his childhood in Pazhaiyarai with Kundavai and Sembiyan Mahadevi.

== Life and works ==
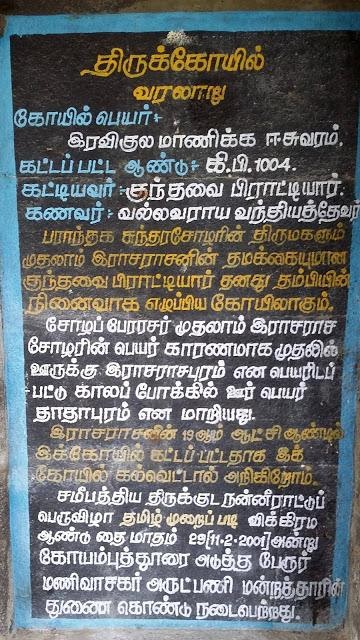
The temple that Kundavai built in memorial of The Great Rajaraja I at Rajarajapuram (Dhadhapuram)

Kundavai commissioned many temples for Tirthankars, Vishnu and Siva. She revered many Jain Monks and Vedantic seers . She features in Chola inscriptions.

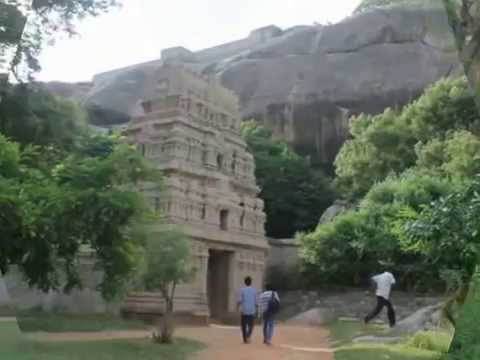
A Jain temple commissioned by Kundavai at Tirumalai (Jain complex) in Tiruvannamalai.

..vessels and ornaments made of gold, silver and pearl and presented to the temples of Kundavai-Vinnagar-Alvar, Iravikulamanikka-Iswara and Kundavai Jinalaya, built by the princess Parantakan Kundavai Pirattiyar, daughter of Ponmaligaittunjiyadevar(Parantaka Sundara Chola).

She is believed to have built many Jain temples but at least two Jain temples have inscriptions that records to have been built by her, one at Rajarajeswaram later known as Darasuram and the other at Tirumalai. She built a hospital after her father named Vinnagar athura salai at Thanjavur and donated extensive lands for its maintenance. She made lavish donations to the Brihadeeswarar Temple at Thanjavur during the reign of her younger brother Rajaraja Chola I and her nephew Rajendra Chola I.

One of the inscriptions reads:

Records gift of sheep for lamps to the temple of Kundavai-Vinnagar-Alvar by princess Pirantakan-Kundavai-Pirattiyar. Also mentioned is the senapati, Mummudi-Chola Brahmamarayar who was in charge of the management of the temple

Some of the images or idols set up by princess Kundavai include:

Here is an excerpt from the 29th year of Rajaraja that lists some of her gifts to Brihadeeswarar Temple:

Hail! Prosperity! Until the twenty-ninth year (of the reign) of Ko-Rajakesarivarman alias Sri-Rajarajadeva who..-
Arvar Parantakan Kundavaiyar, (who was) the venerable elder sister of the lord Sri-Rajarajadeva and the great queen of Vallavaraiyar Vandyadevar
..gave three thousand five hundred karanju of gold, which was a quarter superior in fineness to the (gold standard called) dandavani, and one thousand five hundred karanju of gold, which was one (degree) inferior in fineness to the dandavani, – altogether, five thousand karanju of gold.

Hail ! Prosperity! Until the third year (of the reign) of Ko-Parakesarivarman, alias the lord Sri-Rajendra-Soradeva,-
Arvar Parantakan Kundavaiyar, (who was) the venerable elder sister of the lord Sri-Rajarajadeva (and) the great queen of Vallavaraiyar Vandyadevar gave-

..One sacred girdle (tiruppattigai), (containing) ninety-seven karanju and a half, four manjadi and nine-tenths of gold. Six hundred and sixty-seven large and small diamonds with smooth edges, set (into it), – including such as had spots, cracks, red dots, black dots, and marks as of burning, – weighed two karanju and a quarter and six-tenths (of a manjadi). Eighty-three large and small rubies, viz., twenty-two halahalam of superior quality, twenty halahalam, twenty smooth rubies, nine bluish rubies, two sattam and ten unpolished rubies, – including such as had cavities, cuts, holes, white specks, flaws, and such as still adhered to the ore, – weighed ten karanju and three-quarters, three manjadi and two-tenths. Two hundred and twelve pearls, strung or sewn on, – including round pearls, roundish pearls, polished pearls, small pearls, nimbolam, ambumudu, (pearls) of brilliant water and of red water, such as had been polished while still adhering to the shall, (and pearls with) lines, stains, red dots, white specks and wrinkles, – weighed eighteen karanju and two manjadi. Altogether, (the girdle) weighed one hundred and twenty-nine karanju and seven-tenths (of a manadi), corresponding to a value of four thousand and five hundred kasu..

One ring for the foot of the goddess, (containing) seventy-one karanju and a half and two manjadi of gold. Four hundred and fifty-nine diamonds, set (into it), viz., four hundred and fifty diamonds with smooth edges, and nine small square diamonds with smooth edges, including such as had spots, cracks, red dots, black dots, and marks as of burning, – weighed (one) karanju and a half, three manjadi and nine-tenths. Thirty-nine large and small rubies, viz., ten halahalam of superior quality, eight halahalam, nine smooth rubies, three bluish rubies and nine unpolished rubies, – including such as had cavities, cuts, holes, white speeks, flaws, and such as still adhered to the ore, – weighed three karanju and three-quarters, three manjadi and six-tenths. Altogether, (the ring) weighed seventy-seventy-seven karanju, four manjadi and (one) kunri, corresponding to a value of a five hundred kasu.

Kundavai spent the last days of her life with her nephew Rajendra I at the palace in Pazhaiyarai.

..run-tiru-amudu sëd-arulavaum ăga nellu padin kalam-āga ōrādaikku nellu nūrru irubadin kalamum udaiyār sri-Rājarājadēvarkku mun pirand-arulina sri ālvār sri-Kundavai Pirāttiyār pirand-arulina avitta-tirunālāl tingal oru nāl tiru-vilā elund-arulavu.

== Influence ==
Kundavai is celebrated as mentor to Rajaraja I. Her influence continued into the next generation as she helped rear Rajendra Chola. Uniquely for her era, where royal women were used to forge alliances, Kundavai's father allowed her to exercise her free will, whereupon the princess resolved to stay in the Chola kingdom all her life. Esteemed throughout the Chola realm for her taste and learning, Kundavai was requested to look after the daughters of other royal clans, tutoring them in art, music, and literature.

== In popular culture ==
- Ponniyin Selvan a 1955 historical fiction novel by Kalki Krishnamurthy revolves around the early days of Rajaraja, the mysteries surrounding the assassination of Aditha Karikalan and the subsequent accession of Uttama to the Chola throne.
- S. Varalakshmi portrayed Kundavai Pirattiyar in the 1973 movie Rajaraja Cholan that had Sivaji Ganesan portray the role of Raja Raja Chola.
- Trisha Krishnan portrayed Kundavai Pirattiyar in the movies Ponniyin Selvan: I and Ponniyin Selvan: II.

== See also ==
- Ponniyin Selvan
- Raja Raja Cholan
- Ponniyin Selvan I
- Ponniyin Selvan II
