= Battle of Mudugur =

- Part of Pandyan northern campaign
Date	c. 1257 - 1263 CE
Location	Mudugur, near Nellore (present-day Andhra Pradesh, India)
Result	Pandyan victory: The Pandyas captured Nellore and incorporated it into the Pandyan Empire

Belligerents
Pandyan Empire	Kakatiya-led alliance Seunas (Yadavas); Bana kingdom Telugu Cholas

Commanders and leaders
Jatavarman Sundara Pandyan I	Ganapati-deva; Manumasiddhi II

Strength
Unknown	Unknown

Casualties and losses
Unknown	mid to high

The Battle of Mudugurwas a mid-13th century conflict fought between the forces of the Pandyan Empire under Jatavarman Sundara Pandyan I and a coalition associated with the Kakatiya ruler Ganapati Deva, along with his allies including the Seuna (Yadava) and Bana chiefs. The battle formed part of the Pandyan northern campaign in the Telugu region during c. 1257–1263 CE.

== Background ==
In the mid-13th century, the Pandyan Empire expanded northward under Jatavarman Sundara Pandyan I. As part of this expansion, he subdued several regional powers, including Rajendra Chola III, Vijayagandagopala, and Kopperunchinga II, who subsequently acknowledged Pandyan authority.The campaign then shifted toward the Telugu Chola kingdom of Nellore ruled by Manumasiddhi II. Facing pressure, Manumasiddhi sought support from the Kakatiyas under Ganapati Deva, as well as the Seunas (Yadavas) and Bana chiefs. Inscriptions from regions such as Tripurantakam indicate that the conflict extended into Kakatiya territory and involved multiple allied forces.

=== Invasion ===
The Pandyan advance into the Telugu region formed part of a wider offensive aimed at consolidating control over Kanchipuram and Nellore. Pandyan forces attacked key allies of Manumasiddhi II, including Vijayagandagopala and Kopperunchinga II, both of whom are recorded to have submitted and later cooperated with the Pandyas. Meanwhile, attempts were made by opposing forces to coordinate resistance. Kopperunchinga advanced northward into Kakatiya territory, possibly to establish links with Kalinga. However, he was defeated by Ganapati Deva, who is also recorded to have honoured him, possibly for political reasons.

=== Battle ===
The Battle of Mudugur took place during the Pandyan campaign in the Nellore region. According to Pandyan records and later historical interpretations, the Pandyan army inflicted a significant defeat on the opposing coalition forces, including contingents associated with the Kakatiyas, Seunas, and Banas. The conflict is described as part of a broader series of engagements in which the Pandyan forces advanced northward, reportedly pushing their opponents as far as the banks of the Krishna River (identified in some records as Peraru). The battle weakened the resistance of Manumasiddhi II and his allies.

=== Aftermath ===
The Pandyan campaign resulted in the weakening of the allied forces opposing them, including those associated with Ganapati Deva, the Seunas (Yadavas), and the Bana chiefs. Pandyan records describe the scale of the conflict in emphatic terms, stating that casualties among the opposing forces were widespread and extended up to the banks of the Peraru (generally identified with the Krishna River), while the Bana chiefs are said to have retreated into forested regions.Following these successes, Jatavarman Sundara Pandyan I consolidated his authority over Nellore and Kanchipuram. He is recorded to have performed a virabhisheka (ceremonial anointment celebrating victory) to mark the conclusion of the campaign. Numismatic evidence attributed to this period includes coins that feature the varaha (boar), associated with the Kakatiyas, on one side, and the traditional Pandyan emblem of twin fish on the other, which has been interpreted by historians as reflecting the political assertions of Pandyan supremacy in the region.
