= Ponniyin Selvan =

Indian epic historical fiction novel

- Author: Kalki Krishnamurthy
- Translator: Pavithra Srinivasan; Indra Neelameggham (1993); C.V. Karthik Narayanan (1999); Rajalakshmi Srinivasan - Sanskrit (2015); Sajith M. S - Malayalam (2022)
- Cover artist: Maniam
- Language: Tamil
- Genre: Historical, romance, espionage, thriller, fiction
- Published: Serialised: 29 October 1950 – 16 May 1954; Book form: 1955 (Mangala Noolagam)
- Publication date: 30 September 2022
- Publication place: India
- English publication date: 1993 (Project Madurai); 1999 (Macmillan India)
- Media type: Print (Serial)
- ISBN: 9789672811275 (Kavitha Publication ed.)
- OCLC: 84057533
- Preceded by: Parthiban Kanavu

Ponniyin Selvan (transl. The Son of Ponni) is a Tamil language historical fiction novel by Indian author Kalki Krishnamurthy. It was first serialised in the weekly editions of Kalki, a Tamil magazine, from 29 October 1950 to 16 May 1954 and later integrated into five volumes in 1955. In about 2,210 pages, it tells the story of the early days of Chola prince Arunmozhivarman. Kalki thrice visited Sri Lanka for inspiration and to gather information.

Ponniyin Selvan is regarded as one of the greatest novels of Tamil literature. Publication of the series in "Kalki" magazine increased the publication's circulation to 75,000 subscribers, which was a significant number in post-independence India and a reflection of the work's popularity. The novel continued to be admired in the modern era, developing a cult following and fanbase among people of all generations. Ponniyin Selvan has garnered critical acclaim for its tightly woven plot, vivid narration, witty dialogue, and portrayal of the intrigues and power struggle of the Chola empire in the 10th-century.

The novels were adapted into two films by Mani Ratnam by condensing the first two volumes into Ponniyin Selvan: I, and volumes 3 to 5 into Ponniyin Selvan: II, which were released on 30 September 2022 and 28 April 2023 respectively.

The first publication of the Ponniyin Selvan series outside of Tamil Nadu was released in 2022, published in Malaysia by Jaya Bakti.

== Book volumes ==
=== Overview ===
Volume	Title	Chapters	Note
1	Pudhu Vellam (transl. New Floods)	57	The story unfolds with the journey of the protagonist Vandhiyadhevan to the capital Thanjavur. After discovering a conspiracy, Vandhiyadhevan makes enemies with the royalty.
2	Suzharkaatru (transl. Whirlwind)	53	The events take place in Sri Lanka where Ponniyin Selvan (Raja Raja Cholan) is stationed for "Eezhathu Por" (Battle of Lanka), introduces the tragic stories from the past of the characters' lives.
3	Kolai Vaal (transl. Sword of Slaughter)	46	The revenge set up by the suicide squad of Veera Pandiyan (Aabathuthavigal) against Aditya Karikalan and Chola Empire, tables the plot devised by Nandhini.
4	Manimagudam (transl. The Crown)	46	The struggle for the crown among the members of the Chola dynasty. The inside conspiracy is being revealed eventually among the patriots.
5	Thiyaaga Sigaram (transl. The Pinnacle of Sacrifice)	91	The Climax is set. The conspiracy is broken due to a lack of motivation and the head of the conspiracy comes to senses. Loose ends are tied. The rulers are reunited to avert the danger. The rightful prince offers the throne to his uncle out of magnanimity. The tragic deaths of the main characters also add sorrow to the fact that the story ends.

== Characters ==
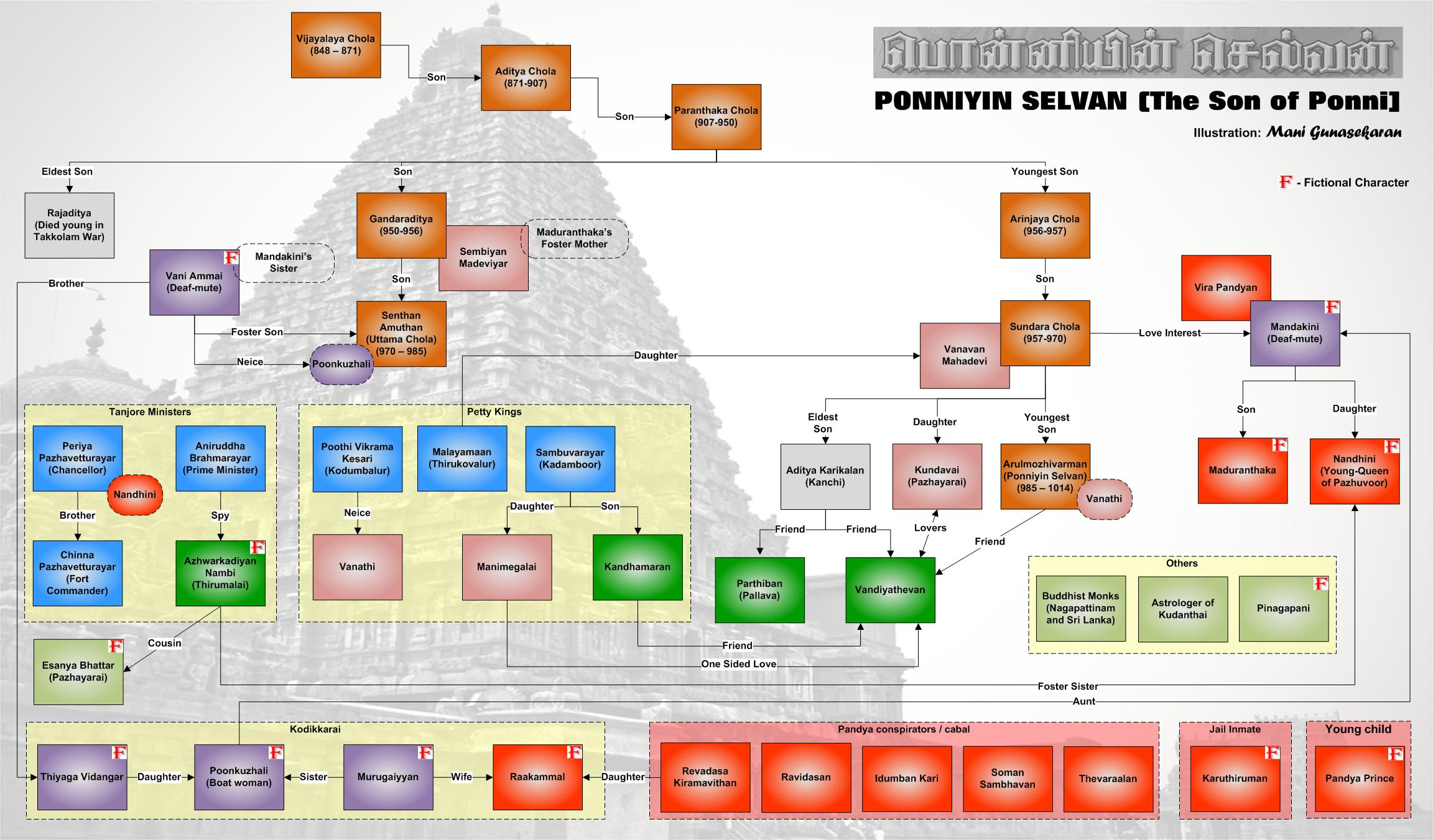
Chart of characters involved in Ponniyin Selvan.

- Vallavaraiyan Vandiyathevan: The brave, adventurous warrior prince with a sense of humour and sarcasm from the Vaanar clan, who later becomes the Commander for Southern Troops under the reign of Utthama Chola. He is the bodyguard and a close friend of Karikalan, who sends him as a messenger to Sundara Chola in Thanjavur to invite him to the newly built golden palace in Kanchi. His impulsive actions put himself and others in danger but he comes out of them with trickery and luck. He is the lover of Princess Kundavai. Manimekalai, the sister of Kandanmaran, is in a one-sided love with him.
- Nandhini: Pazhuvoor Queen (Ilaya Rani) and wife of Periya Pazhuvettaraiyar whose birth and origin was kept doubtful in the beginning, the main antagonist of the story. She was born in Madurai and grew up in a priest family along with royal children in Pazhayarai until her youth. She is the foster-sister of Azhwarkadiyan Nambi. She is described as the most beautiful women in the entire novel. She hated Kundavai as Kundavai was jealous of Nandhini's beauty. Nandhini and Prince Aditya Karikalan developed a liking for each other in their childhood which nobody in the royalty liked. She was forced to flee Pazhaiyarai and live in Madurai. After Aditya Karikalan beheaded the injured Veerapandiyan, Nandhini joined Pandya conspirators and vowed to avenge Veerapandiyan's death by killing Karikalan and destroying the Chola dynasty. By marrying Periya Pazhuvettaraiyar who had lusted for her and by using him, she continued to help the Pandya conspirators from powerful position. She had a deep hatred towards the Chola royals for their ill-treatment she once received and also had a desire for the throne. She had a terrible childhood that affected her badly and wanted to be with her mother Mandakini. Parthibendra Pallava and Kandanmaran fell for her beauty and she exploited them to her use/ plot. It is also to mention that Mandakini Devi went to Thanjavur (while she was pregnant), Sembiyan Maadevi was pregnant too, so she took care of Mandakini during her pregnancy. During child birth Sembiyan Maadevi gave birth to a still born son but Mandakini gave birth to twins - a boy (Madhurantaka) and a girl (Nandhini). Sembiyan Maadevi swapped her still born son with Mandakini's son. She asked Vaani Ammal (a maid in the place at that time) to bury her still born son and gave the daughter to Azhwarkadiyan's parents. After leaving the palace, Vaani Ammal notices that Sembiyan Maadevi's son (Senthan Amuthan) is alive. She fosters him and raises him as her own son.
- Azhwarkadiyan Nambi alias Thirumalaiappan: A Veera Vaishnavite spy who works for the Prime Minister Aniruddha Brahmarayar and Queen Mother Sembiyan Mahadevi. He is the foster-brother of Nandhini and also a close friend of Vandiyathevan. He works closely with Vandiyathevan and saves him from many dangers. He was a loyal, trustful servant to the Chola royal government. He often engages in verbal battles with Veera Shaivites and Advaitis.
- Periya Pazhuvettaraiyar: The chancellor and treasurer of the Chola kingdom from the Pazhuvettaraiyar clan who was respected for his valor, as demonstrated by his 64 battle scars. The second most powerful man in the empire. Enamoured by her beauty, he marries a much younger Nandini, and gets manipulated and exploited by her. He was also the leader of the conspirators who tried to make Madhurantakan the next emperor.
- Kundavai alias Ilaya Pirattiyar: The Chola princess. Second child and only daughter of Sundara Chola. Lover of Vandiyathevan. She was respected much by her father and the people for her intelligence, wit and political prudence. Unlike other princesses of those times, she had ambitions of expanding the Chola empire and enhancing its glory and took a vow to never leave her motherland. She used her brother Arunmozhivarman and his son to achieve her ambition. She raised and taught Arunmozhivarman to be an intelligent prince and wished to make him the Chola emperor. She was jealous of Nandini's beautiful appearance and intelligence and hated her. She sent Vandiyathevan to bring back Arunmozhivarman from Sri Lanka to guard him.
- Vaanathi: The shy but playful princess of Kodumbalur. She was raised by her uncle Periya Velar Boothi Vikramakesari because both her father, Siriya Velar and mother are killed. She was sent to Pazhayarai to be one of Kundavai Devi's many friends/ helpers. She tends to faint in stressful situations due to which Ilaya Piratti takes special care of her, making the other princesses envious. She receives a prophecy from Kudanthai Jothidar stating she will bear an extraordinary warrior son who will conquer all 7 seas. She has an immense devotion for Ponniyin Selvan and wishes to marry him but due to Poonguzhali's accusation that her motive to marry Arunmozhi is for the throne, she vows to never sit on the throne if she marries him.
- Arunmozhivarman/ Ponniyin Selvan later known as Rajaraja I: The titular protagonist. The youngest son of Sundara Chola. He was raised in Pazhayarai by Periya Piratti and Ilaya Piratti. He was taught well by his sister and was sent to Sri Lanka at the age of 19 for battle. He was said to be saved by Mother Kaveri herself from drowning in the river when he was 5, earning him the title "Ponniyin Selvan" ("Son of Kaveri").
- Aditha Karikalan: Eldest son of Sundara Chola, the crown prince and the commander of Northern troops during Sundara Chola's reign. He was a distinguished warrior who began fighting at the age of 12. He was known all over the empire for his valiant acts. His haste and irascibility alienated many, and resulted in a conspiracy against him. Aditha Karikalan and Nandhini were also childhood lovers who were separated by the then Chola royals for their relationship.
- Poonguzhali: A boat woman, she was born and raised in Kodaikkarai. She was adventurous and fearless. She deeply distrusted and disliked men and civilisation. She holds great affection for her aunt Mandakini Devi. She also has an intense love for Ponniyin Selvan and yearns to be Queen because she believes her Aunt should have been the rightful Queen. She saves Arunmozhivarman when he drowns in the ocean and secretly takes him to Nagapattinam to recuperate. She was named "Samudrakumari" (The Maiden of the Ocean) by Prince Arunmozhivarman himself. She marries Senthan Amuthan/ Madhuranthakan and attains her desire of being Queen.
- Madhurantaka Uttama Chozhan alias Senthan Amudhan: He is the son of Sembian Madevi who was given to the flower seller Vaani Ammal, assuming to be a still born baby. . He is a close friend of Vandiyathevan, and helped the latter many times in his missions when he was still known as the son of Vaani Ammal and a calm, humble and honest Shaivite devotee.
- Vaani Ammai: The deaf and mute foster mother of Senthan Amuthan, sister of Mandakini and Thiyaaga Vidankar. Aunt of Poonguzhali. She was skilled in traditional medicine remedies.
- Chinna Pazhuvettaraiyar: alias Kaalandhakandar: The chief in-charge of Thanjavur fort. Younger brother of Periya Pazhuvettaraiyar to whom he had huge respect and love. He is the father-in-law of Mathuranthakar. Both Pazhuvettaraiyar brothers hated Vandiyathevan at first. Chinna Pazhuvettaraiyar constantly warns his brother about Nandini and her conspiracy, but his cautionary words fall on deaf ears.
- Sundara Chola alias Parantaka II: The emperor of Chola empire. He was known for his facial beauty which gave him his name 'Sundara'. When his legs became paralysed and his health began rapidly deteriorating, the Pazhuvettaraiyar brothers moved the emperor from Pazhayarai to Thanjavur so they could better protect him. This sparked the debate for the next rightful heir. His wish was to appoint his uncle's son as his successor. There was a widespread rumor that the emperor was kept as a prisoner by the Pazhuvettaraiyar brothers.
- Vanavan Madevi alias Idaya Pirattiyar: Empress of the Chola empire. Chief queen, wife and caretaker of Sundara Chola. Mother of all his children. Daughter of Thirukovalur Malaiyamaan.
- Sembiyan Madevi alias Periya Pirattiyar: Wife of Gandaraditya Chola and mother of Utthama Chola. A Shaivite devotee who donates a lot of resources to build temples for Lord Shiva across the Chola empire. She was steadfast in not making her son the emperor, which was also the dying wish of her husband. [Mandakini Devi went to Thanjavur (while she was pregnant), Sembiyan Maadevi was pregnant too, so she took care of Mandakini during her pregnancy. During child birth Sembiyan Maadevi gave birth to a still born son but Mandakini gave birth to twins – a boy (Madhurantaka) and a girl (Nandhini). Sembiyan Maadevi swapped her still born son with Mandakini's son. She asked Vaani Ammal (she was a maid in the place at that time) to bury her still born son and gave the daughter to Azhwarkadiyan's parents. Vaani Ammal after leaving the palace notices that Sembiyan Maadevi's son (Senthan Amuthan) is alive, she fosters him and raises him as her own son.]
- Pinaagapani: Son of the traditional healer in Pazhayarai. He was narrow-minded and ambitious and always considered Vandiyathevan his enemy but gets beaten by him all throughout the story. Pinaagapani was sent by Kundavai with Vandiyathevan to lead the way from Pazhaiyarai to Kodikkarai where the former lusts over Poonkuzhali but fails to attract her. His desire to gain high positions in the empire make him prey to Nandini's plans. Killed by Kandhanmaaran
- Thirukovalur Malaiyaman alias Milaadudaiyar: Father-in-law of Sundara Chola and maternal grandfather to his children. He was a well-wisher and advisor for Karikalan and lived with him in Kanchi. He was a rival of the Kadamboor ruler.
- Parthibendra Pallavan: Friend of Karikalan, who comes from the lineage of Pallavas. He fought along with him in battles. He lusts Nandhini and hates Vandiyathevan from the beginning.
- Thiyaaga Vidankar: Father of Poonguzhali and in-charge of the light house at Kodikkarai. He is the younger brother of Mandakini Devi and Vaani Ammal.
- Rakkammaal: Sister-in-law of Poonguzhali. She joined the Pandiyan conspirators due to her greed for money. Revadasa Kiramavithan was her father.
- Anbil Aniruddha Brahmarayar: The Prime Minister of emperor Sundara Chola's Court and a close friend and confidante to the emperor. He was highly respected by the people for his wit and intelligence. On Sundara Chola's request, he became the minister and assisted Sundara Chola in matters of administration in addition to being a teacher. He was the keeper of many of the emperor's personal and royal secrets. His network of spies across the Chola empire ensured that almost nothing could happen without his knowledge. One of the best of them is Azhwarkadiyan Nambi.
- Boothi Vikramakesari alias Kodumbalur Periya Velar: Irunkovel chieftain and uncle of Vaanathi. The Commander of the southern troops during Sundara Chola's reign. He fights alongside Arunmozhivarman against Mahindan's troops in Sri Lanka. He had a desire for Vaanathi to marry Arunmozhivarman and thus become the Queen. He and Thirukovalur Malaiyaman opposed the proposition of making Mathuranthakar the heir to the throne. The Kodumbalur Velars and Pazhuvettaraiyars were rivals though they were both loyal to the Cholas.
- Theveraalan (alias Parameswaran), Idumbankkari, Ravidasan, Soman Sambavan, Revadasa Kiramavithan: Antagonists of the novel. Bodyguards of the late Veerapandiyan. They conspire to kill the members of the Chola royal family. Ravidasan and Parameswaran were once ministers in Chola court. Ravidasan and Revadasa Kiramavithan were acting as wizards. Idumbankkari was acting as a guard in Kadambur palace.
- Amarabhujanga Nedunchezhiyan/ former Madhurantakan: Foster Son of Sembiyan Maadevi who was raised as a Shaivite. He was raised a calm and humble Shaivite and taught not to desire the throne. He was brainwashed by his twin sister Nandini to develop a greed for the throne. Kundavai and others thought that he was untalented and lacked the basic characteristics and skills to be an emperor. The people of the Chola kingdom did not want him to become the ruler either. He fled once he discovered he was the son of Veera Pandiyan and the crown prince of Pandya Kingdom, turning into a warrior.
- Mandakini alias Oomai Rani/ Singala Nachiyar: The deaf and mute mother of twins, Nandini and Amarabhujangan. Love interest of Sundara Chola. She had great affection towards his children and her niece, Poonguzhali. She is always around Arunmozhivarman and saves him from many dangers. [Mandakini Devi went to Thanjavur (while she was pregnant), Sembiyan Maadevi was pregnant too, so she took care of Mandakini during her pregnancy. During child birth Sembiyan Maadevi gave birth to a still born son but Mandakini gave birth twins to a boy (Madhurantaka) and a girl (Nandhini). Sembiyan Maadevi swapped her still born son with Mandakini's son. She asked Vaani Ammal (she was a maid in the place at that time) to bury her still born son and gave the daughter to Azhvarkadiyan's parents. Vaani Ammal after leaving the palace notices that Sembiyan Maadevi's son (Senthan Amuthan) is alive, she fosters him and raises him as her own son.]
- Sambuvaraiyar: The petty ruler of Kadamboor from the Sambuvaraya family.
- Chinna Sambuvaraiyar alias Kandhanmaran: Prince of Kadamboor. Son of Sambuvaraiyar and close friend of Vandiyathevan. He is the one who arranges for the petty rulers to gather in Kadamboor and hold a meeting to conspire to make Madhurantakan the next Chola emperor. He then assumes that Vandiyathevan tried to kill him and begins to think of him as his worst enemy.
- Murugaiyan: Elder brother of Poonguzhali. Husband of Rakkammaal. He rowed the Pandiyan conspirators to Sri Lanka from Kodikkarai. But later compensated for his unknowing wrongdoing by helping Arunmozhivarman reach Thanjavur.
- Manimekalai: Innocent and shy princess of Kadamboor. Younger sister of Kandanmaaran and daughter of Sambuvaraiyar. She had deep, immense love for Vandiyathevan that he did not reciprocate.
- Karuthiruman aka Paithiyakaran (The Madman): An assistant of Veerapandian and prisoner in the dungeons of Thanjavur. Claims to know the location of the Pandyan crown and sceptre hidden in Sri Lanka.
- Kudanthai Jothidar: The astrologer in the town of Kudanthai (present-day Kumbakonam) who predicts that Arunmozhivarman will become a great emperor. He also predicts that Vanathi will marry Arunmozhi and bear a great king who will take the Chola dynasty to its glory. He later moves to Thiruvaiyaru since his house was destroyed in the Kaveri floods.
- Kalyani: Mother of Sundara Chola. Wife of Arinjaya Chola.
- Parangusan Nedunchezhiyan: Pandian Prince. The 5-year-old son of Veerapandiyan and his Queen, raised by Nandini and the Aabathudhavigal (Pandyan conspirators) who declared him the successor of Veerapandiyan at Thirupurambiyam Pallipadai.
- Eesaana Sivabattar: The priest of the Shiva temple in Pazhayarai. Elder brother of Azhwarkadiyan and foster brother of Nandini. He helps Vandiyathevan secretly meet Kundavai in Pazhayarai when the Pazhuvettaraiyar brothers were searching for him there.
- Aacharya Bhikshu: The head monk of Chudamani Vihara in Nagapattinam who saves Arunmozhivarman when he was affected by Kulir Suram.
- Chandramathi: Maid and companion of Manimekalai in Kadambur palace who is literate and helps her read the final letter written by Aditha Karikalan.
- Veera Pandian: Pandian King. Father of Nandhini, Amarbhujangan and Parangusan. Husband of Mandakini. Killed by Aditha Karikalan when he was hiding in Nandhini's hut.

== Plot summary ==
=== Book 1: Pudhu Vellam (The Fresh Floods) ===
The story is set during the reign of Sundara Chola (Parantaka Chola II), now old and bedridden in Thanjavur Fort unaware of the looming internal conspiracies threatening the stability and future of his vast empire. It begins with Vallavaraiyan Vandiyathevan, a brave warrior from the Vaanar clan, sent by Prince Aditya Karikalan to deliver crucial messages to the emperor and Princess Kundavai. As he travels through Chola Nadu, he makes acquaintance with Azhwarkadiyan Nambi, a Vaishnavite spy working for Aniruddha Brahmarayar (Sundara Chola's chief minister). Nambi reveals that there is a conspiracy to overthrow the present Chola rule. Vandiyathevan arrives at Kadambur Palace, where the Pazhuvettaraiyar brothers and several nobles have assembled secretly. Periya Pazhuvettaraiyar, the powerful chancellor of the empire, and his younger brother Chinna Pazhuvettaraiyar, backs up Madhurantaka Chola's claim to the throne instead of Aditya Karikalan or Arunmozhivarman (Ponniyin Selvan) after Sundar Chola. Vandiyathevan overhears the secret meeting and realises the danger to the Chola princes. He also catches a glimpse of Azhwarkadiyan Nambi eavesdropping the same meeting.

In Thanjavur, Nandini, the young and beautiful wife of Periya Pazhuvettaraiyar, is revealed to be a key conspirator: her hatred toward the Chola royal family is hinted at. It is also learnt that she secretly works for the Pandya rebels, who want revenge for the killing of Veerapandiyan, the last Pandya king, by the hand of Aditya Karikalan. Vandiyathevan meets Nandini, who tries to use him for her own plans, but he cleverly evades her.

Vandiyathevan continues his travel to Thanjavur fort and manages to deliver the message from Aditya Karikalan to Sundara Chola in Thanjavur Fort and also apprises him of the recent developments in Kadambur palace. Periya Pazhuvettaraiyar starts suspecting Vandiyathevan and orders his men to watch him. Realizing the danger, Vandiyathevan escapes from Thanjavur. He also meets Sendhan Amudhan, a humble flower-seller and poet who helps him avoid getting caught. Vandiyathevan travels to Pazhayarai to meet Kundavai.

Meanwhile, Arunmozhivarman (Ponniyin Selvan) is in Sri Lanka, fighting battles and expanding the Chola Empire.

=== Book 2: Suzharkaatru (Whirlwind) ===
Vandiyathevan proceeds on his journey to Pazhayarai and meets Princess Kundavai, Aditya Karikalan's sister. Kundavai, a highly intelligent and politically astute princess, immediately understands the gravity of the conspiracy against her family. She entrusts Vandiyathevan with the task to travel to Sri Lanka and bring Arunmozhivarman back to Chola Nadu.

In the meantime, Nandini continues her skilful manipulation, drawing powerful figures into her web to utilise them in her own conspiracy: she fuels resentments in Pazhuvettaraiyars in their plans against the Chola princes and placing Madurantaka on the throne. Her connection to Veerapandiyan, the Pandya rebel, is hinted at.

Whilst in Sri Lanka Arunmozhivarman fights against and defeats Mahinda, the Sinhalese king. He also tries to restore peace among the people and visits an ancient Buddhist monastery, where he meets a mysterious woman who resembles Nandini (later revealed to be Mandakini Devi, Nandini's mother). Arunmozhivarman helps rebuild the Anuradhapura Buddhist monastery, gaining the love and respect of the Lankan people. He also learns about his mysterious connection to the river Ponni (Kaveri) and how he was saved as a child.

Vandiyathevan, disguised as a monk, travels to Lanka but gets caught by Periya Pazhuvettaraiyar's spies. He is taken as a prisoner but later escapes with the help of Poonguzhali, a dauntless and independent boatwoman. He also learns that Pandya loyalists are plotting against Arunmozhivarman.

Vandiyathevan finally meets Arunmozhivarman and informs him about the conspiracy in Chola Nadu. It is also learnt that a Chola ship has arrived to take Arunmozhivarman back on king's order. As they begin their return journey fraught with ambush and adversity, their ship is caught in a violent storm. Arunmozhivarman is presumed dead, and news of his death spreads across the Chola kingdom.

=== Book 3: Kolai Vaal (The Sword of Slaughter) ===
Arunmozhivarman is again rescued by his apparent guardian angel, Oomai Rani (Mute Queen) Mandakini Devi, who has saved him multiple times in the past. Poonguzhali, along with Sendhan Amudhan, helps hide Arunmozhivarman in Choodamani Viharam (a Buddhist monastery in Nagapattinam). He remains in hiding, recovering from the upshot of the preceding event. There, the prince meets monks and scholars who warn him about the dangers awaiting him in the Chola kingdom. Meanwhile, Azhwarkadiyan Nambi and Sendhan Amudhan keep watch over him and prevent enemies from locating him.

On the other hand, Vandiyathevan is captured by Periya Pazhuvettaraiyar's men and accused and interrogated in his involvement in the political turmoil and the prince's disappearance. He is imprisoned for treason but is later freed through Kundavai's intervention.

Pandya rebels, in collusion with Nandini and led by Ravidasan, plan to assassinate Aditya Karikalan. Nandini reveals that she will invite Aditya Karikalan to Kadambur Palace to make way for the confrontation there.

=== Book 4: Mani Magudam (The Jeweled Crown) ===
Aditya Karikalan, despite warnings from his sister Kundavai and friend Parthibendran, travels to Kadambur Palace for a private meeting with Nandini. He believes he can confront Nandhini and resolve the differences between them. However, the Pandya conspirators and Nandhini have arranged for his assassination.

The Pazhuvettarayars officially declare Madhurantakan as the rightful heir to the throne, hoping to overthrow Sundara Chola's rule. However, Sembiyan Madevi refuse to support him while the Chola ministers and generals remain divided.

In the meantime, Vandiyathevan and Arunmozhivarman return to Chola Nadu in disguise, foiling some attempts on the life of the latter.

The mute woman, Mandakini Devi, continues to appear at critical moments. She enters the palace and meets Sundara Chola, leaving him shocked and emotional. It is revealed that she once saved Sundar Chola in Lanka and was in love with him and is deeply connected to the royal family's past. At that moment, the assassins throw a spear at the Emperor, however, Mandakini takes it for him, later dying from her wounds.

The book ends on a suspenseful note, with the murder of Aditya Karikalan at Kadambur Palace. Vandiyathevan who was trying to intervene and save the prince is falsely accused and arrested. It is not revealed who killed him.

=== Book 5: Thyaga Sigaram (The Zenith of Sacrifice) ===
The assassination of Aditha Karikalan sends shockwaves through the Chola Empire. Sundara Chola is devastated, and the empire is thrown into turmoil over succession.

The real conspirators, the Pandya assassins led by Ravidasan, are caught and Nandini's role is exposed in the entire affair.

Periya Pazhuvettarayar realizes he was used by Nandhini; he becomes heartbroken and realises the gravity of his deed. He decides to redeem himself by protecting the Chola dynasty.

Vandiyathevan, wrongly accused and sentenced to death is saved by intervention of Kundavai and Arunmozhivarman. With the help of Azhwarkadiyan Nambi, he escapes prison and joins Arunmozhivarman.

Mandakini sacrifices her life to save Sundar Chola and Arunmozhivarman fulfilling her lifelong duty to safeguarding them.

Nandini realizes that she has lost everything, her revenge, her power, and even Periya Pazhuvettarayar's trust. Overcome with despair, Nandhini mounts a horse, bids farewell and disappears into the country alone, there is no further information about her.

Vandiyathevan is officially pardoned after proving his innocence. He marries Kundavai while Poonguzhali marries Sendhan Amudhan becomes a guardian of the Chola dynasty's history.

With Karikalan dead, the question of succession arises. Sundara Chola wants Arunmozhivarman to take the throne, but the prince refuses out of respect for his father. Instead, Madhurantakan (Uttama Chola) is crowned as king, restoring stability to the empire.

Madhurantaka briefly takes the throne but realizes he has been used and steps down. In a big revelation, it is learnt that when the actual baby Madhurantakan (the rightful Chola prince) was born to Queen Sembiyan Mahadevi and Gandaradithya Chola, the queen secretly exchanged him with another newborn—Sendhan Amudhan, the son of a temple servant, Vaani Ammal. Thus the claim of the person known as Madhurantakan, the son of Vaani Ammal, was brought up in the royal family as Madhurantakan, without knowing his true origins was in fact invalid.

Arunmozhivarman Becomes Rajaraja Chola I. Sundara Chola, before his death, names Arunmozhivarman as his successor. Arunmozhivarman focuses on his naval campaigns and administration. With Rajaraja Chola I's coronation, the Chola Empire ushers in its golden era.

== Publication ==
2015 Sanskrit Translation of Ponniyin Selvan by Rajalakshmi Srinivasan and published by Central Sanskrit University, Delhi, India.

The novel was first serialised in the weekly editions of Kalki during the period from 29 October 1950 to 16 May 1954 resulting the total period of development of work be 3 years, 6 months, and 18 days. The following year, Managala Noolagam released the novel in book form.

== Adaptations ==
=== Film and television ===
There have been several attempts to create film adaptations of Ponniyin Selvan, beginning with an attempt in 1958 by M. G. Ramachandran. He bought the film rights to the novel for ₹10,000 (equivalent to ₹1.0 million or US$11,000 in 2026), and announced that he would produce, direct and star in the adaptation which would feature an ensemble cast including Gemini Ganesan, Vyjayanthimala Bali, Savitri, Padmini and B Saroja Devi. Ramachandran chosen Mahendran to write screenplay for the film. Before shooting could begin, Ramachandran met with an accident, and the wound took six months to heal, Ramachandran was unable to continue with the film despite renewing the rights four years later.

In the late 1980s, actor Kamal Haasan and Mani Ratnam worked together on adapting the novel into a film. Ratnam revealed that he worked on a first draft of the film alongside Kamal Haasan, who had bought the rights of the novel from Ramachandran, but the pair shelved their plan as the project did not make financial sense at the time. Ramachandran also requested Bharathiraja to make the film. Kamal Haasan then attempted to make the story into a forty-part television series during the early 1990s, and worked with writer Ra. Ki. Rangarajan on the screenplay, but the project was later stalled.

In the 2000s, there were further attempts to make the book into television series by Makkal TV and by Kalaignar TV, through a project directed by Naga. A 32-hour animation film was planned by Rewinda Movie Toons, a Chennai-based animation studio, in 2008 and took seven years to complete. The film was set to be released by April 2015, but remains unreleased as of October 2022. In late 2010, Ratnam renewed his interest in his film project and worked alongside writer Jeyamohan to finalise the script for the film adaptation of Ponniyin Selvan. The film was later shelved before the start of the filming stage, as the expected cost of production escalated. Jeyamohan stated that the film did not materialise as the team struggled to find available locations to shoot the film. He revealed that temple officials in Tamil Nadu refused to allow the team to film scenes on the premises and that the expensive cost of producing replica sets meant that it would not be a viable solution.

In 2016, Eros International engaged Jeyamohan and Soundarya Rajinikanth, as a creative producer, to make the book into a web-series but the project did not develop into production. In early 2019, Soundarya Rajinikanth associated with another production house, May 6 Entertainment, and director Sooriyaprathap to make a web-series of the novel for MX Player. After years of little promotion, Soundarya announced that the project was still under the planning phase during September 2021. In January 2021, a further adapted web series produced by Eternitee Motion Krafte and directed by Ajay Pratheeb titled Chiranjeevi Ponniyin Selvan was announced. The makers announced that the series would have 125 episodes, with technicians such as Ilaiyaraaja and Sabu Cyril joining the team.

==== 2022 & 2023 Mani Ratnam film adaptation ====
In early 2019, Mani Ratnam officially restarted production on his film project. His two-film adaptation featured an ensemble cast consisting of Vikram, Aishwarya Rai Bachchan, Jayam Ravi, Karthi and Trisha. In September 2021, the filming for both parts got completed. The films were released on 30 September 2022 and 28 April 2023, in five Indian languages.

=== Stage play ===
Avvai Shanmugam was the first to organise a conference on Tamil drama in Erode, and the first to organise a drama contest, in 1945. One of the prize winning scripts was 'Raja Raja Chozhan,’ which was staged in 1955 with Shanmugam as prince Rajendra. 'Raja Raja Chozhan' was also presented at the Motilal Nehru Centenary celebrations in Delhi in 1961, earning compliments from Nehru for the splendid acting. In Singapore, 'Raja Raja Chozhan' was also enacted 90 times. Overall it was staged 2,146 times.

Avvai Shanmugam played the role of Maamallan in Kalki's 'Sivakamiyin Sabatham' and the sets were grand, befitting the story. For the scene in which Paranjothi tames an elephant that runs amok, two men inside a specially made elephant, operated levers as they walked in unison.

In 1999 the book was adapted into a stage play by E. Kumaravel and was staged by Magic Lantern Theater in Buck's Theatre inside YMCA Nandanam, Chennai. The script's length was originally over nine hours long, but was shortened into a performance time of four hours and 20 minutes and featured 72 actors on a multi-level setting.

Again, the book was adapted into a stage play in a very grand scale by SS International Live along with Magic Lantern theatre group in Chennai, in June 2014. The crew includes Kumaravel, who penned the screenplay & dialogues, Thotta Tharani as art director, Preethi Athreya as costume designer and Bhanu leading the make-up and hair styling department. Pravin directed the play.

Chicago Tamil Sangam staged the play in May 2013 with over 40 volunteers in cast and crew.

=== Novels and Comic books ===
The Tiger Throne by Preetha Rajah Kannan is an English retelling of this vast 5 volume epic in one complete novel.

In 2017, Nila comics started releasing series of comic books where every comic book is an adaptation of two chapters from the novel. It is available in Tamil and English. As of January 2019, There have been 18 comic books released in Tamil and 10 in English.

== Digital Availability ==
The original serialized version of Ponniyin Selvan, as published in Kalki magazine, has been fully digitized by Raja Illam Media, including the authentic illustrations by artist Vinu. This edition preserves the original chapter formatting and visual interpretations of the Chola period, providing readers with an experience faithful to the initial publication.

The complete digitized version of Ponniyin Selvan is freely accessible online here.

== English and other translations ==
There are at least six different translations of Ponniyin Selvan available in English by Preetha Rajah Kannan, Indra Neelamegam, Pavithra Srinivasan, CV Karthik Narayanan, Varalotti Rengasamy and Sumeetha Manikandan. On 21 February 2015, a Sanskrit translation by Rajalakshmi Srinivasan was released at a public function in Chennai.

=== English translations ===
Translator	Title	Pages	Publication date	Publisher(s)	Ref(s)
Pavithra Srinivasan	Ponniyin Selvan Book 1: Fresh Floods	454	1 December 2019	Zero Degree Publishing	
Pavithra Srinivasan	Ponniyin Selvan Book 2: Whirlwinds	482	1 December 2019	Zero Degree Publishing	
Pavithra Srinivasan	Ponniyin Selvan Book 3: Sword of Slaughter	424	1 October 2020	Zero Degree Publishing	
Pavithra Srinivasan	Ponniyin Selvan Book 4: The Jewelled Crown	426	2 April 2021	Zero Degree Publishing	
Pavithra Srinivasan	Ponniyin Selvan Book 5: The Zenith of Sacrifice	866	1 January 2022	Zero Degree Publishing	
C. V. Karthik Narayanan	Ponniyin Selvan Part 1 : The First Floods	404		Macmillan Publishers, Laxmi Publications, Trinity Press, Pustaka Digital Media	
C. V. Karthik Narayanan	Ponniyin Selvan Part 2 : The Cyclone	370		Macmillan Publishers, Laxmi Publications, Trinity Press, Pustaka Digital Media	
C. V. Karthik Narayanan	Ponniyin Selvan Part 3 : The Killer Sword	288		Macmillan Publishers, Laxmi Publications, Trinity Press, Pustaka Digital Media	
C. V. Karthik Narayanan	Ponniyin Selvan Part 4 : The Crown	274		Macmillan Publishers, Laxmi Publications, Trinity Press, Pustaka Digital Media	
C. V. Karthik Narayanan	Ponniyin Selvan Part 5 : The Pinnacle of Sacrifice – Volume 1	300		Macmillan Publishers, Laxmi Publications, Trinity Press, Pustaka Digital Media	
C. V. Karthik Narayanan	Ponniyin Selvan Part 5 : The Pinnacle of Sacrifice – Volume 2	387		Macmillan Publishers, Laxmi Publications, Trinity Press, Pustaka Digital Media	
C. V. Karthik Narayanan	Ponniyin Selvan – All Volumes	2831		Macmillan Publishers, Laxmi Publications, Trinity Press, Pustaka Digital Media	
Indra Neelamegam	Ponni's Beloved: Part 1– New Floods	264	1993, updated 2022	Free on Project Madurai ePub available at Smashwords, Barnes and Noble	
Indra Neelamegam	Ponni's Beloved: Part 2 -- Whirlwind	254	1995, updated 2022	Free on Project Madurai ePub available at Smashwords, Barnes and Noble	
Indra Neelamegam	Ponni's Beloved: Part 3 -- A Killing Sword	252	Updated 2022	Free on Project Madurai ePub available at Smashwords, Barnes and Noble	
Indra Neelamegam	Ponni's Beloved: Part 4 -- Jeweled Crown	280	2022	Free on Project Madurai ePub available at Smashwords, Barnes and Noble	
Varalotti Rengasamy	Kalki's Ponniyin Selvan Part-1 to Part-5 Set	2128	2016	Kavitha Publication	
Sumeetha Manikandan	Ponni's Beloved Volume 1: New Floods	341	2019	Kavitha Publication	
Sumeetha Manikandan	Ponni's Beloved Volume 2: The Storm	389	2019	Kavitha Publication	
Sumeetha Manikandan	Ponni's Beloved Volume 3: The Sword	386	2020	Kavitha Publication	
Sumeetha Manikandan	Ponni's Beloved Volume 4: The Crown	314	2020	Kavitha Publication	
H. Subhalakshmi Narayanan	Ponniyin Selvan, Book 1: New Waters	2150	2016	Ailum Books	
H. Subhalakshmi Narayanan	Ponniyin Selvan, Book 2: Whirling Cyclone			Ailum Books	
H. Subhalakshmi Narayanan	Ponniyin Selvan, Book 3:The Killer Sword			Ailum Books	
H. Subhalakshmi Narayanan	Ponniyin selvan, Book 4: The Crown			Ailum Books	
H. Subhalakshmi Narayanan	Ponniyin Selvan, Book 5 & 6:The Epitome of sacrifice			Ailum Books	

=== Malayalam translations ===
Translator	Title	Pages	Publication date	Publisher(s)	Ref(s)
G.Subramanian	Ponniyin Selvan	1200	2022	DC Books	
Sajith M. S	Ponniyin Selvan (പൊന്നിയിൻ സെൽവൻ )		2022	Pratilipi Malayalam Free Reading	Also Available in Pratilipi FM

== See also ==
- Sivagamiyin Sapatham
- Parthiban Kanavu
- Romance of the Three Kingdoms

== Bibliography ==
- Krishnamurthy, Kalki (1955). Ponniyin Selvan பொன்னியின் செல்வன் (in Tamil). Madras: Mangala Noolagam. OCLC 84057533.
  - Krishnamurthy, Kalki. Puthu Vellam புது வெள்ளம் (in Tamil). Vol. 1.
  - Krishnamurthy, Kalki. Chuzharkaattru சுழற்காற்று (in Tamil). Vol. 2.
  - Krishnamurthy, Kalki. Kolaivaal கொலை வாள் (in Tamil). Vol. 3.
  - Krishnamurthy, Kalki. Manimakudam மணிமகுடம் (in Tamil). Vol. 4.
  - Krishnamurthy, Kalki. Thyaaga Sigaram தியாகச் சிகரம் (in Tamil). Vol. 5.
- Neelameggham, Indra (1993). Ponniyin Selvan of Kalki Krishnamurthy.
  - Neelameggham, Indra. Neelameggham, R; Ramadorai, Elizabeth (eds.). Part 1A New Floods. Online: Project Madurai.
  - Neelameggham, Indra. Neelameggham, R; Ramadorai, Elizabeth (eds.). Part 1B New Floods. Online: Project Madurai.
  - Neelameggham, Indra. Neelameggham, R (ed.). Part 2A Whirwind. Online: Project Madurai.
  - Neelameggham, Indra. Neelameggham, R (ed.). Part 2B Whirwind. Online: Project Madurai.
  - Neelameggham, Indra. Neelameggham, R (ed.). Part 3A A Killing Sword. Online: Project Madurai.
- Krishnan, Mini, ed. (1999). Kalki R. Krishnamurthy's Ponniyin Selvan. New Delhi: Macmillan India. OCLC 263145239.
  - Narayanan, C.V. Karthik (1999). The First Floods. Macmillan India Limited. ISBN 978-0-333-93309-1.
  - Narayanan, C.V. Karthik (2018) [1999]. The First Floods. New Delhi: Pustaka Digital Media. ISBN 978-9352859542.
  - Narayanan, C.V. Karthik (1999). The Cyclone. Macmillan India Limited. ISBN 978-0-333-93300-8.
  - Narayanan, C.V. Karthik (1999). The Killer Sword. Macmillan India Limited. ISBN 978-0-333-93301-5.
  - Narayanan, C.V. Karthik (1999). The Crown. Macmillan India Limited. ISBN 978-0-333-93307-7.
  - Narayanan, C.V. Karthik (1999). The Pinnacle of Sacrifice. Macmillan India Limited. ISBN 978-0-333-93551-4.
