= Parantaka =

Parantaka was a name adopted by a number of South Indian kings. It may refer to:

- Parantaka I (907–950), Chola king
- Parantaka II (957–970), Chola king
- Jatila Parantaka Nedunjadayan (765–815), Pandyan king
- Parantaka Viranarayanan (880–905), Pandyan king

== See also ==
- Prant, a former administrative division of India
