= Pratilipi =

Indian self-publishing portal

- Website type: Online self publishing; Digital storytelling
- Available in: Hindi; Gujarati; Bengali; Marathi; Malayalam; Punjabi; Odia; Kannada; Telugu; English; Urdu
- Founded: September 2014; 12 years ago
- Headquarters: Bengaluru, Karnataka, India
- Creators: Ranjeet Pratap Singh; Prashant Gupta; Rahul Ranjan; Sahradayi Modi; Sankaranarayanan Devarajan
- Subsidiaries: Pratilipi Comics; Pratilipi FM
- Website: pratilipi.com
- Commercial: Yes
- Registration: Optional
- Users: 2 crore (20 million)
- Current status: Active

Pratilipi is an Indian online self-publishing and audiobook portal headquartered in Bangalore. Founded in 2014, the company allows users to publish and read original works such as stories, poetry, essays, and articles in twelve languages: Hindi, Urdu, English, Gujarati, Bengali, Marathi, Malayalam, Tamil, Kannada, Telugu, Punjabi and Odia. The company also launched two other storytelling platforms - Pratilipi Comics & Pratilipi FM, and has also forayed into different formats such as web series, motion series, podcasts, and films.

== History ==
Pratilipi is a Sanskrit word meaning "copy". It allows users to publish and read original works such as stories, poetry, essays, and articles. It also allows readers to rate content others post, subscribe to authors, and interact with their followers through messaging.

It was launched in September 2014 by Ranjeet Pratap Singh, Prashant Gupta, Rahul Ranjan, Sahradayi Modi, and Sankaranarayanan Devarajan to promote Indian languages. In its initial stage, it was a self-funded platform that allowed users to publish and read original works such as stories, poetry, essays, and articles in two languages- Hindi and Gujarati and had the first one million reads on the platform in 386 days. Later, the creators raised funding of ₹30 lakh from TLabs (Times Internet Accelerator) in March 2015 and raised another USD $1 million from investors led by Nexus Venture Partners in 2016.

At its launch, the platform featured content in only two languages: Hindi and Gujarati. It later expanded to six more languages; Bengali, Marathi, Kannada, Tamil, Telugu and Malayalam. It also raised US$4.3 million from Series A round led by Omidyar Network in February 2018, and in 2020 secured ₹76 crore in the funding round of Series C led by Tencent.

In early 2018, the company raised Series A to expand and strengthen its product, technology, and data science teams. By this time, Pratilipi had over 80 million content pieces that had been read on the platform with over 150,000 content pieces published by more than 22,000 authors.

By 2020, Pratilipi expanded its language portfolio to the 12 most spoken languages across the country. The company marked 10 Mn MAUs mark in January 2020 and grew to 20 million in a span of five months. In the year 2020, Pratilipi launched two storytelling platforms, Pratilipi Comics and Pratilipi FM to experiment with newer formats such as audio and graphics and entered into various partnerships to explore formats such as motion graphics, web series, physical books. In late 2020, Pratilipi acquired IVM Podcasts, India's premier podcast network to tap into the growing podcast industry. The company launched monetization features in 2021 and currently, most of the top-earning authors are women.

In 2022, Flipkart collaborated with Pratilipi to provide e-books on its platform.

In 2023, Audible (owned by Amazon) and Pratilipi entered into a deal to transform literary works into audiobooks and audio shows.

Pratilipi reported operating revenue of ₹7.88 crore in FY22.

== Founding team ==
Pratilipi's parent company, Nasadiya Technologies Private Limited was launched in September 2014 and officially incorporated in March 2015 by Ranjeet Pratap Singh, Prashant Gupta, Rahul Ranjan, Sahradayi Modi, and Sankaranarayanan Devarajan to promote storytelling in Indian languages.

== Funding ==
In its initial stage, it was a self-funded platform. Later the creators raised funding of ₹30 lakhs from TLabs (Times Internet Accelerator) in March 2015, and raised another US$1 million from investors led by Nexus Venture Partners in 2016. It also raised US$4.3 million from Series A round led by Omidyar Network in February 2018, and in 2020 secured ₹76 crores in the funding round of Series C led by Tencent. In July 2021, in the Series D round, it raised $48mn led by Krafton Inc along with existing investors Omidyar Network and a few start-up founders.

== Products ==
- Pratilipi
- Pratilipi FM
- Pratilipi Comics
- The Write Order
- IVM Podcast
- Westland Books

== Award and recognitions ==
- Pratilipi was awarded Eureka Award for Best Business Idea by IIT Bombay and StartUp Launchpad Award for best startup.
- Tashree, a comic book by Pratilipi Comics was awarded 'Best Digital Comic' Award at Comic Books and More Summit & Awards 2021 by Animation Xpress.
- Pratilipi was showcased at the first-ever Indian Language Digital festival, Bhasha, on 11 March in New Delhi, supported by the Ministry of Culture, Government of India, and exclusive language partner Reverie Language Technologies.
- ASK Private Wealth Hurun India future unicorn Index 2022 has listed Pratilipi under "Cheetah Start Ups" (Hurun Report defines Cheetah as a startup founded after 2000 and has the potential to go Unicorn in the next 4 years.
- Pratilipi was one of the five global finalists in the ‘Best Retention Campaign’ at Mobile Growth Awards presented by Branch.
- Flipkart collaborates with Pratilipi to create the biggest library of fiction and nonfiction e-books in 12 Indian languages across multiple genres like romance, horror, self-help, and motivation.
- The Viral Fever (TVF), acquires the rights to Seema Jain's Hindi short story from Pratilipi, an online literature platform.
- Pratilipi Comics acquired the rights for the highly acclaimed graphic novel “Atharva: The Origin”, featuring ace cricketer MS Dhoni as the titular character.
