= Mazhavaraayas =

Surname of Tamil Nadu

Mazhavaraayas or Mazhavars is a Tamil language name.

== Sangam literature ==
In the Sangam age this region was ruled by Mazhavar King Kolli Mazhavan. Sangam poet Avvaiyar had cordial relations with the Mazhavar chieftains, including Athiyamān Nedumān Añci of Thagadoor and Valvil Ori of Kollimalai. Mazhanadu was divided into two major parts, Mel-Mazhanadu (Western Mazhanadu) and Keezh-Mazhanadu (Eastern-Mazhanadu). The Malavas also occupied the territory on the northern and western border of the Tamil land. Their chiefs took the Tamil title Malavaraiyan which has become Malavarayan which is still a common name in the Tamil country of Kallar families.

== Polygars of Ariyalur ==
Oppilla Mazhavaraayas were the Polygars of Ariyalur. They were different from the Mazhavaraya clan who were kin of Chozhas. Their original title was Nayanar. Their leader was awarded the title of Ranavijaya Oppilla Mazhavaraya by a ruler of Vijayanagara Kingdom, under whom they served, for defeating certain Prathaparudran. Ramanayanar is recorded to be the first of these polygars. A Village 15 miles south-east of Valikandapuram. The Zamindar of Ariyalur belong to Palli or Vanniyar Caste.

== Polygars of Punavasal ==
Punavasal Zamin is located in Peravurani taluk in Thanjavur district of Tamil Nadu. It was a zamin ruled by a Kallar caste with the title of Malavaraya Pandarathar. In 1879, the zamin, which had an area of 2527 acres, was paid to the Government at 350 rupees 15 annas 7 paise.

== See also ==
- Palaiyakkarar
