= Magadai =

Magadai or Magadai Mandalam was a Tamil kingdom that flourished during the 13th and 14th centuries near the modern-day Aragalur. Aragalurudaiya Ponparappinan Rajarajadevan, alias Magadesan, was the Bana chief who ruled this region around 1197. There were three important chieftains in this region:

- Kadava with capitol at Kudalur near Cuddalore and Sendamangalam
- Malaiyamaan with capitol at Tirukkoyilur and Killiyur
- Magadai mandalam with its chief
  - Rajarajan
  - ponparappina-perumal (Rajarajan's son)
  - vira Magadan Rajarajadevan pon parappinan Magadaipprumal (second chief of Rajarajan)

Another chief family near Aragalur were the Vanakkovaraiyars with headquarters at Thedavur.

The Magadai Mandalam was at the height of their power during the transition of Chola dynasty to Pandyan and Hoysala. There are a large number of inscriptions about the Magadai chiefs in North (Tiruvannamalai & Vellore) and South Arcots (Cuddalore and Villupuram), Chingleput and Thanjavur districts.

There are Buddha idols in the fields and a 6-foot-tall (1.8 m) Buddha statue in the temple in Thiyaganur village near Aragalur. There is a possibility that descendants of the Magadhan Empire could have settled in this area on their way south to Sri Lanka.
