= Aniruddha Brahmarayar =

Chola dynasty minister

Aniruddha Brahmarayar was a leading minister in the court of the Chola emperor Parantaka II. The "Anbil plates" of Parantaka II are the primary source of information about him

== Family and ancestry ==
Aniruddha was born in a Vaishnava Brahmin family of the village of Anbil. He belonged to Harita gotra. Aniruddha's father was a teacher of the Vedas.

== Lineage ==
It is believed that many of the descendants of the Rayar dynasty moved to a small town Swamimalai situated in the present day Thanjavur district. The wards of Rayar blended with the local community to avoid persecution by the Mughals and later by the British Empire.

== Position ==
In the Anbil plates of Parantaka II, Aniruddha is mentioned as manya sachiva. He was given the title Brahmarayar or Brahmadhiraja meaning "Brahmin king", usually reserved for high-ranking Brahmin bureaucrats in the Chola Empire. Aniruddha's family was also given a generous grant of several velis by the monarch.

== In popular culture ==
Aniruddha Brahmarayar is one of the central characters in Kalki Krishnamurthy's semi-historical novel Ponniyin Selvan. This character, in Mani Ratnam's film adaptation of the novel (Ponniyin Selvan: I and Ponniyin Selvan: II), was played by Mohan Raman.
