= Bana kingdom =

South Indian dynasty

The Bana or Vana was a dynasty based in South India, who claimed descent from king Mahabali. The dynasty takes its name from Bana, the son of Mahabali. The Banas faced opposition from several neighbouring dynasties and served some major dynasties such as the Chalukyas, Cholas and Pandyas as feudatories, sometimes after they were subjugated by them. They also served as Samantas to some dynasties. The Banas had their capital at various places at different times, including Kolar and Gudimallam. The Banas were a native Kannada ruling dynasty.

== History ==
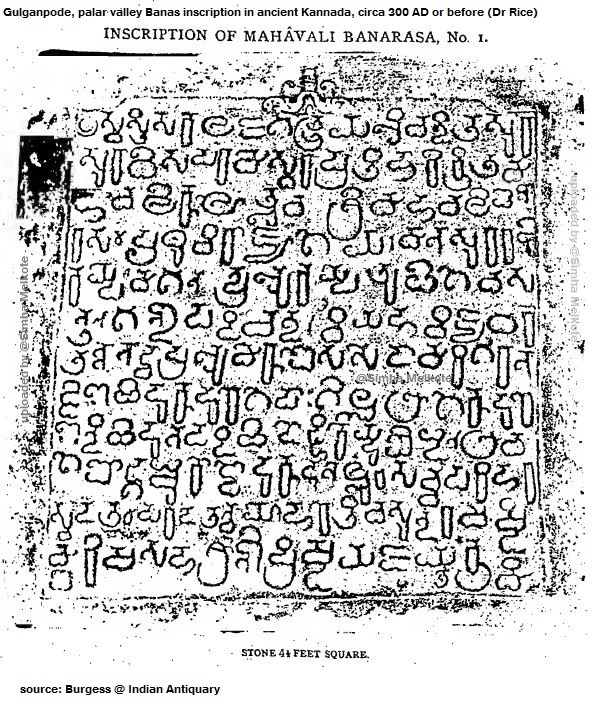
Mahabali Banarasa Old kannada inscription dated 300 AD or much earlier at Gulgan Pode, Palar valley

The earliest mention of the Banas in authentic historical records is in the middle of the fourth century AD, and as the feudatories of the Satavahana and early Pallavas.

But from the actual literature history (Mysore State Gazetteer 1968), The Mahavalis or Brihadbanas who ruled the present Kolar and Chikkaballapur districts of Karnataka are the descendants of King Banasura or King Bana, son of King Mahabali. King Brihadbana was the grandson of Mahabali. Last known ruling king of this generation was King Sambayya. They were in constant conflicts with Nolambas and Western Gangas of the Kolar region. They had Vaidumbas as their allies. They had the present day Avani region (a village in Kolar District) as their capital.

The Bana dynasty had a distinctive emblem, featuring a black flag and a bull crest. An inscription discovered in Mulbagal Taluk dating back to the year 339 AD, written in Sanskrit, begins by praising Shiva, whose throne is said to be on the mountain peak called Nandi. This peak is believed to be the present-day Nandidurga, which is considered to personify Nandi, the bull of Shiva. The inscription documents the grant of the village of Mudiyanur (also known as Chudagrama, a Sanskritized form of Mudiyanur) to 25 Brahmins by Vadhuvallabha-Malladeva-Nandivarma, the son of Vijayaditya Deva and grandson of Nandivarma, a notable figure from Mahabali's dynasty. The king, who was in the town of Avanya (Avani), is credited with bringing prosperity to the Bana dynasty and has been compared to Bodhisattva.

The Banas seem to have been a strong power almost until the decline at the end of the 9th century. In the battle of Soremati about 874, Banas they, together with the Vaidumbas, are said to have defeated the Gangas and the Nolambas. Further, their inscriptions of 898, 905 and 909 A.D. mention no overlord. But all the same, the Banas had adversaries on all sides, and their power was continually being undermined since the close of the 9th century. They ultimately appear to have lost their independence by the first half of the 1Oth century at the latest. If the Nolamba king Mahendra (c. 870-897) is described as the cunning king who has ended the Mahabali family, the Chola king Viranarayana or Parantaka claims in 921 to have uprooted by force two Bana kings and conferred the title of Banadhiraja on the Ganga prince Prithvipathi II, who helped him in this task. In 961, which is the date of the latest Bana inscription in this district, we find one King Sambayya ruling a small district under the Pallava king Iriva or Dilipa. But the Banas did not disappear altogether from the political history, as is evident from the references to them in some later literary works and inscriptions. Stray Bana records have been found outside this district, particularly in the south, as late as the first quarter of the 16th century AD. The history of the Banas, who, during a period of more than a thousand years, moved from district to district, from the Andhra-desha in the north to the Pandya country in the far south where they were governors of Madurai under the Pandya kings, is particularly interesting in that it illustrates the long survival of a dynasty by migrations.

== Boundaries ==
The Bana kingdom was made up of various regions at different points in time and was known by the following names:

- Perumbanappadi (the great Bana country), of the Sangam period. It is the Tamil equivalent of the 'Country of Brihad-Bana' or 'country of the Brihad (great) Bana'. Perumbanappadi was a large tract of land which lay to the west of Andhrapatha. It had Punganur, Kolar and Srisailam in the west, Kalahasti and Sholingur in the east, while the river Palar formed its Southern boundary. Its capital was Thiruvallam also known as Vanapuram. Perumbanappadi formed a part of the province of Jayakonda Sola Mandalam and also represented the north-western portions of Thondai-Mandalam.
- Balikula Nadu (kingdom of the Banas). It was made up of parts of modern Chittor, Ananthapur and Cuddapah districts. A portion of Balikula Nadu later included parts of Nellore. The Banas were located in the said regions as early as the 7th century AD and were affiliated with the Tamil Cholas.
- Andhrapatha (aka Andhra-desa or Province of the Andhras) traditionally between the Godavari and Krishna rivers. This Bana kingdom, known as Andhrapatha, originally extended as far as Kalahasti in the west and covered the whole of present-day North Arcot district. It also included present day Guntur and flourished under the Satavahanas. Andhrapatha was known to the Tamils as Vadugavalli, Vadugavalli Merku or Vadugavalli 12,000. Andhrapatha was developed into Andhramandala by a grant given by the Bana king, Vadhuvallaba Malladeva Nandivarman in AD 338. Andhrapatha was ruled by Ikshvaku kings, such as Virapurshadatta.

== In Medieval South India ==
The Western Ganga dynasty king, Prithivipati II was conferred the title "lord of the Banas" by Parantaka I Chola after he defeated the Banas. After the Chola King, Parantaka I deprived the Banas of their Andhrapatha kingdom between 909 and 916 AD, the Banas were subsequently found ruling various parts, such as Nellore, Guntur and Anantapur, as chieftains in medieval Andhra.

=== In Nellore ===
An inscription discovered in Sannamur revealed the existence of a Bana dynasty that ruled the northern part of Nellore district in the 11th century AD. The Bana king at that time was named Aggaparaju (also known as Aggraparaju alias Aggappa), who claimed his descent from Mahabali and asserted lordship over Paravipura and Nandagiri. While nothing is known about his predecessors, it is believed that Aggappa may have ruled as a vassal of the Chalukya prince, Vimaladitya.

=== In Konidena ===
Churrabali I or Churaballiraja I of the Banas was ruling in Konidena in the 12th century AD. Churaballi II alias Churabbiraju II, served as a Mahamandaleshwara and bore a long prasasti and titles similar to that of Aggapparaju. Hence it is suggested that he was a descendant of Aggappa Raju. Churabbiraju's only record from Konidena dated 1151 AD mentions him as "Mahamandalesvara Berbaha Churraballi Raju". His epithets mention he belonged to Vashista gotra. He claimed lordship over Paravipura and Nandagiri and ruled in a part of Kammanadu.

=== Other Banas ===
- Chittarasa, figuring in a record of 1122 AD record of Anantapur, was perhaps of Bana lineage.
- In the time of Prataparudra of the Kakatiya Dynasty, some Banas are heard of in the Telugu country. They have been mentioned in the work 'Prataparudra Yashobhushana' written by Vidyanatha.
- Trivikramadeva claimed a Bana descent and flourished in the 15th century. He wrote Trivikrama Vritti, a work on Prakrit grammar.
- The last date for the Vijayanagar Viceroys (Nayaks) of Madurai claiming a Bana descent is 1546 AD.

== Brihatphala ==
Based on the copper plates of Jayavarman Brihat-Phalayana, it has been suggested that Brihat-Phala means the same as Brihad-Bana, where 'phala' and 'bana' both have the same meaning as 'arrowhead'. The Brihat-phalayanas ruled in regions around Masulipatnam around the 3rd century AD. Additionally, the Saka Mahakshatrapas of Ujjain claimed Brihatphala (Bahaphala) gotra and were linked with the Ikshvakus. A record of the Ikshvakus of the Guntur-Krishna region mentions that a queen named Varma Bhatarika, the wife of Maharaja Ehuvula Chantamula, and daughter-in-law of Maharaja Chantamula, is said to have belonged to Bahapala (that is, Brihat-phala or Brihatphalayana) gotra and is said to have been the daughter of a Mahakshatrapa. It may therefore be surmised that Brihatphala was possibly used as a gotra name to indicate descent from Brihad-Bana.

== Bana kings ==
Some Bana kings mentioned in various historical sources are:

- Jayanandivarman
- Vijayaditya I, son of Jayanandivarman
- Malladeva, son of Vijayaditya I
- Bana Vidhyadhara, son of Malladeva (Married a granddaughter of the Ganga King Siva Maharaja, who reigned between 1000 and 1016 AD)
- Prabhumerudeva, son of Banavidhyadhara
- Vikramaditya I, son of Prabhumerudeva
- Vikramaditya II or Pugalvippavar-Ganda, son of Vikramaditya I
- Vijayabahu Vikramaditya II, son of Vikramaditya II
- Aragalur Udaiya Ponparappinan Rajarajadevan alias Magadesan (Magadai Mandalam chief) of Aragalur
- Vallavaraiyan Vandiyadevan

== In Sangam literature ==
An ancient Tamil poem of the Sangam period, describes a scene in front of a Vanar Palace thus:

Poets are leaving the palace with plenty of gifts from the King, while the arrested rulers of smaller regions of the kingdom, who have failed to pay tribute to the King and waiting for the King's pardon happen to see the poets leaving with expensive gifts which are actually things seized by the King from them. One of them, seeing the gifts, says that it is his horse that one the poet takes away, while another one points out to his elephant, similarly and so on goes the poem, capturing the might of ancient Vanars. This poem explains the wealth and power of Southern Vanars. Kalki, in his historic novel Ponniyin Selvan, describes a scene in which the protagonist, Vallavaraiyan Vandiyadevan, who he claims to be of Vanar descent, broods over the fall of his clan, singing this poem.

== Titles ==
The Bana Chieftains held various titles in different regions and at different times, including Vanar, Vanara, Vanavarayar, Vanakovarayar, Ponparappinan, and some claimed titles such as "Vaana-Kulothoman," "Ganga-kula-uthaman," and "Kaangeyar," among others.

== See also ==
- Perumpāṇāṟṟuppaṭai
