= Aditha Karikalan =

Chola prince (942–971)

- Virapandiyan Thalai Konda Koparakesari Varman Karikalan
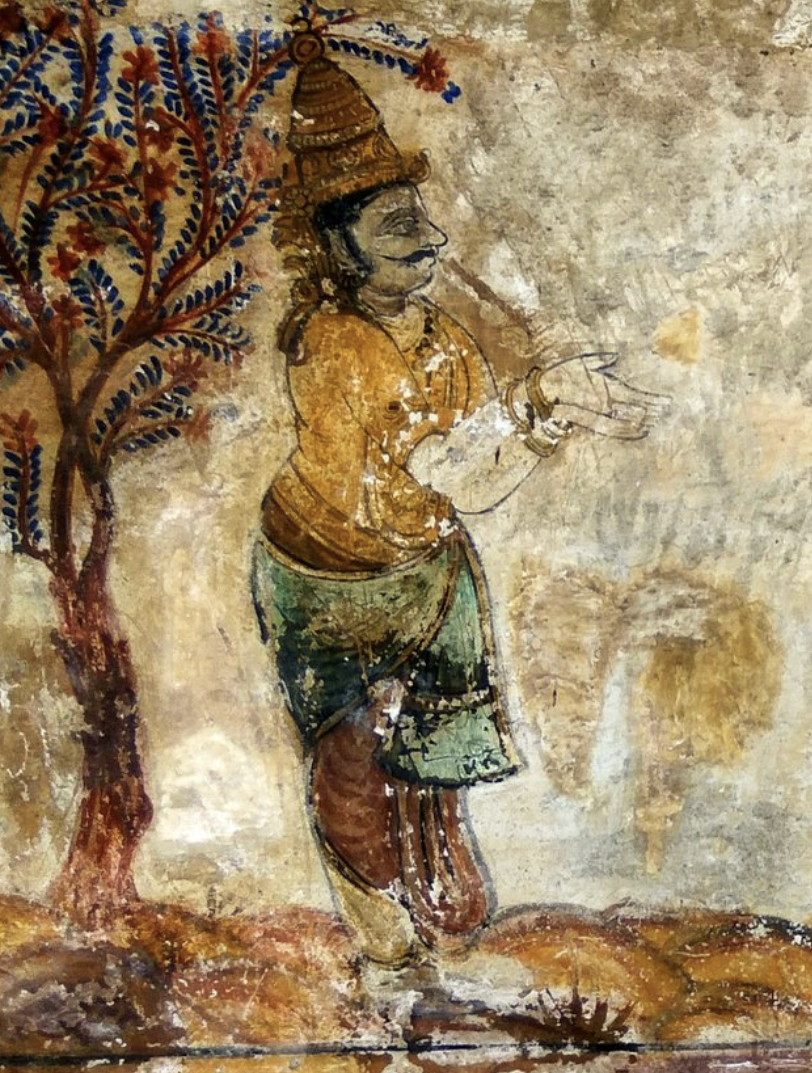
- Mural of Prince Aditha Karikalan at Brihadisvara Temple

Co-Regent of the Chola Empire
- Reign: 966–971
- Emperor: Parantaka II
- Predecessor: Parantaka II
- Successor: Uttama Chola
- Born: Aditha Karikalan; 942; Tirukoilur, Chola Empire (modern day Tamil Nadu, India)
- Died: 971 (aged 28–29); Melakadambur, Chola Empire
- Spouse: Ilaada Madeviyar
- Issue: Karikala Kannan, aka Karikala Karnan
- Dynasty: Chola
- Father: Parantaka II
- Mother: Vanavan Mahadevi
- Religion: Hinduism

Aditya II (942–971), also known as Aditha Karikalan, was a Chola prince who lived in the 10th century in India. He was born in Tirukoilur and was the eldest son of Parantaka Chola II. He was the elder brother of Rajaraja Chola I and Kundavai. He was called Virapandiyan Thalai Konda Koparakesari Varman Karikalan. Archaeologists also posit that he might have been known as Parthivendra Pallavan in the Northern parts of the kingdom.

== Early life ==
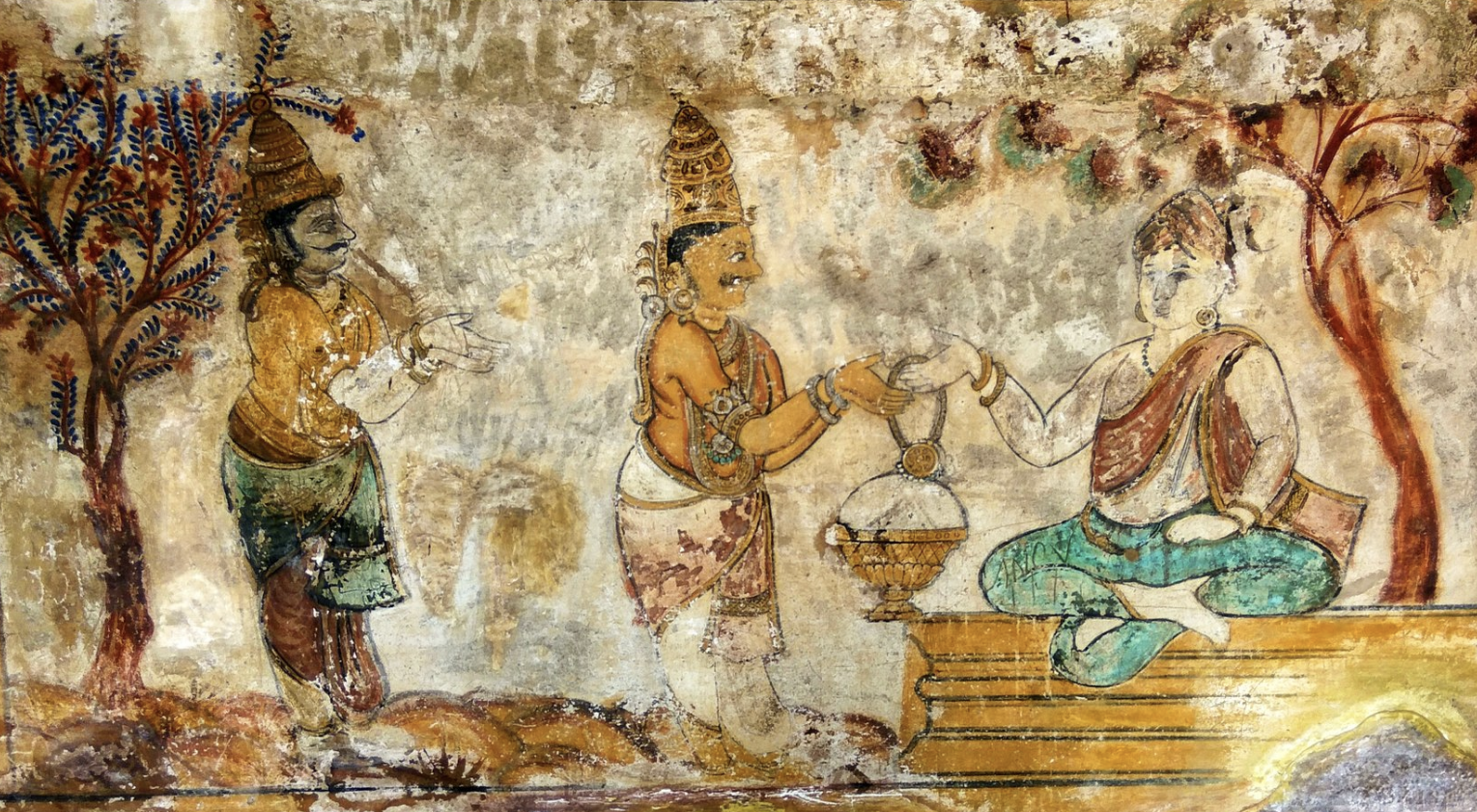
Karikalan and his brother Rajaraja Chola I meeting their guru.

Aditha Karikalan was the elder son of the Chola king Parantaka II (alias Sundara) and queen Vanavan Mahadevi. He was the elder brother of Rajaraja Chola and Kundavai.

He led the Chola expedition against the Pandyas and defeated the Pandya king Veerapandyan at the Battle of Chevur. He killed Veerapandiyan after chasing him on the banks of Vaigai River. According to the Esalam bronze and copper plates discovered in Esalam village in Tamil Nadu, Aditha Karikalan conquered the Pandya ruler in battle and beheaded him. Aditha was made the co-regent and heir apparent to the Chola throne even though Uttama Chola, the son of Gandaradita Chola, had a stronger claim to the throne. Aditha Karikalan was assassinated and was succeeded by Uttama Chola, it is unknown how he passed away.

The Udaiyarkudi stone inscriptions in Anandheeswarar temple at present day Udaiyarkudi in Tamil Nadu names the killers - Soman Sambavan, Ravidasan alias Panchavan Brammadhirajan, Parameswaran alias Irumudichozha Brammadhirajan and Malaiyanooran. The inscription also mentions the decree of Raja Raja confiscating the lands of the murderers. As per epigraphs, the inquiry into the death was completed in the second year of Rajaraja Chola I's reign and the lands of certain officials were confiscated for their complicity in the murder of "Karikala Chola who took the head of the Pandya".

Historians are divided as to whether the inscription says that the confiscation was a direct royal order of Rajaraja or that the decree was giving permission for selling the land confiscated earlier from the killers.

According to archaeologist Kudavayil Balasubramanian, "Dr K T Tirunavukkarasu in his collection of historical essays titled "Arunmozhi Aiyvu Thogudi", comprehensively ruled out Madurantaka Uttama's role in Aaditha Karikala's murder. In the said article, basing his view on a number of historical data points, Dr Tirunavukkarasu has gone on to explain that there was a delay in apprehending the perpetrators immediately thereafter and it was only during Rajaraja I's second regnal year that the culprits were brought to book . Suspicions were pointed to Uttama Chola, but confiscations of land belonging to culprits started before Raja Raja's period, suggesting that Uttama Chola did not spare the plotters. Among the punished were Ravidasan, Soman and Parameshwaran who were all government officials.

== In popular culture ==
- Ponniyin Selvan, a Tamil language historical fiction novel by Indian author Kalki Krishnamurthy, tells the story of the early days of Chola prince Arulmozhi Varman and features Aditha Karikalan as an important character.
- PS-1 and PS-2, movie adaptations by Indian director Mani Ratnam of the 1955 Ponniyin Selvan novel, feature Vikram as Aditha Karikalan.
