= Sembiyan Mahadevi =

Empress of the Chola Empire, r. 949–957

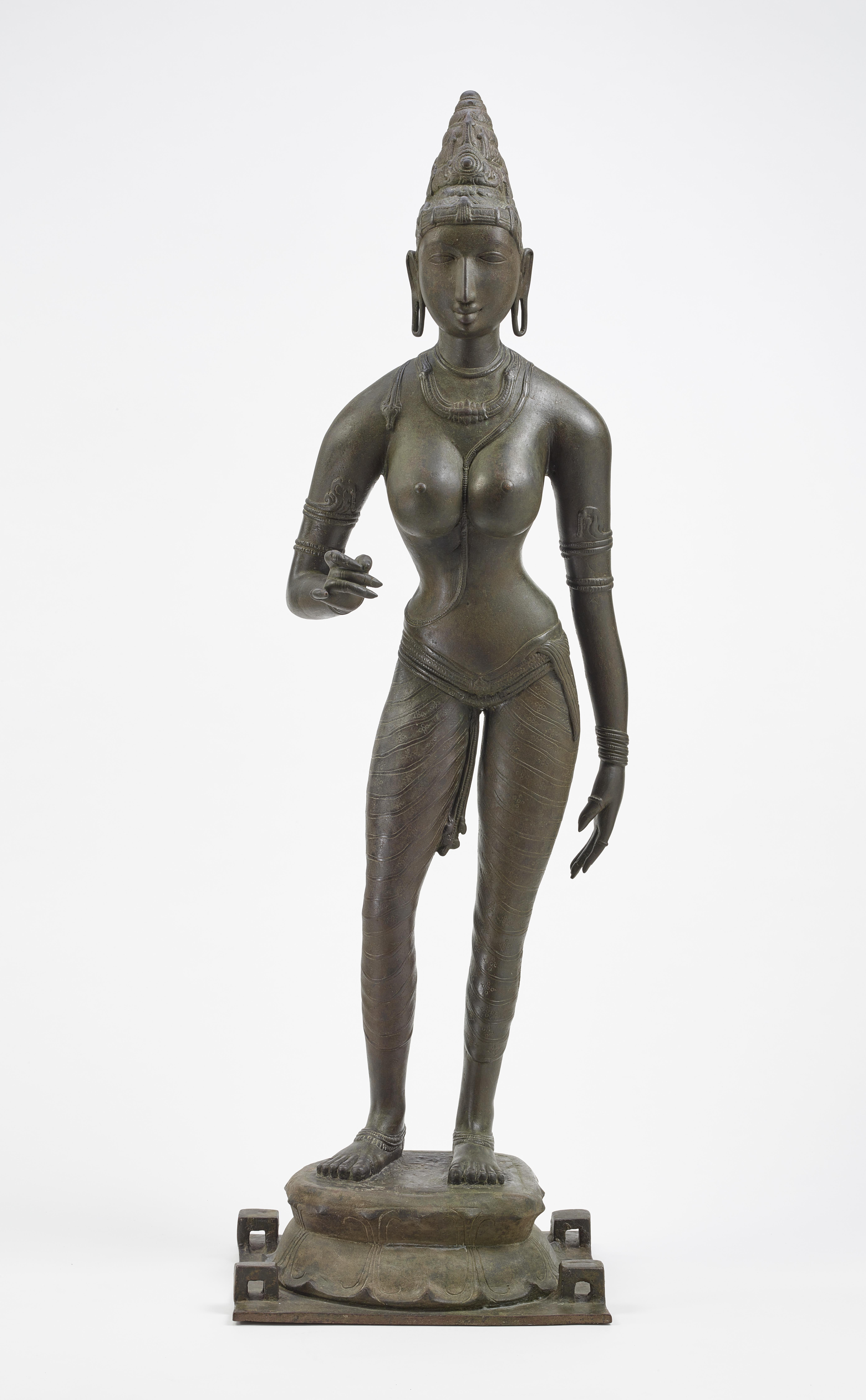
- Sembiyan Mahadevi as Queen with her crown

Queen Consort of the Thanjavur and Empress Consort of Chola Empire
- Reign: 949 CE – 957 CE
- Predecessor: KoIravi Nili Solamadeviyar
- Successor: Viranarayaniyar

Queen dowager of Thanjavur
- Reign: 957 CE – till death (After a queen's husband dies, she becomes the widow of the empire)
- Born: Sembiyan Selvi; Thanjavur, Chola Empire (modern day Tamil Nadu, India)
- Died: Thanjavur, Chola Empire (modern-day Tamil Nadu, India)
- Spouse: Gandaraditya Chola
- Issue: Uttama Chola
- Dynasty: Chola (by marriage)
- Religion: Hinduism

Sembiyan Mahadevi was Queen consort and empress of the Chola Empire from 949 CE – 957 CE as the wife of Gandaraditya Chola. She is the mother of Uttama Chola. She was one of the most powerful empresses of the Chola empire who over a period of sixty years constructed numerous temples and gave generous gifts to many temples in South India. She figures as early as, if not before, Saka 901 during the reign of her son. According to an inscription dated 941, Sembiyan Mahadevi is said to have made an endowment so that a lamp may be kept permanently lit in front of the Shiva deity (perhaps not long after the crystallization of the Chidambaram Nataraja (Natarāja) cult).

After her husband Gandaraditya Chola's death, she immediately lost her title as Queen and Empress and was later known as the Queen dowager of Thanjavur (Queen Dowager and mother of the king). She lost all of her power as queen and empress and only wore white which was known as the grief color, setting her self into mourning for the rest of her life.

== The mother of Madhurantaka Uttama Chola ==
She was the queen of Gandaraditya Chola (Sri-Gandaraditta Devatam Pirattiyar) and is always referred to as the mother of Uttama Chola, Uttama Chola Devarai Tiru-vayiru-vaiykka-udaiya Pirattiyar Sri Sembiyan Mādeyiar (the queen who had the fortune to bear Uttama Chola Deva), also known as the Great Queen of the Sembiyan. This distinction is made in the inscriptions to differentiate her from the other queens who held the title both before and after her. Various inscriptions indicate that she was the daughter of a Mazhavarayar chieftain. In the beginning, she consistently identifies herself as the daughter of Sri Sembiyan Mādeyiar.

== Patron of Art and Architecture ==
She was very pious and was an avid temple builder and has built numerous temples some of which are at Kutralam, Virudhachalam, Aduthurai, Vakkarai, Anangur, etc. She has made some of the most lavish endowments of the Chola empire. Tiru-Ara-neri-Alvar temple was one of the earliest temples built by her. She bestowed several gifts of bronzes and jewellery to the Kalyanasundaresar temple of Thirunallur or Nallur Agraharam in 967-968 CE, including the bronze idol of the goddess of Nallur temple worshipped today (known as Uma Paramesvari), whose style is typical of Sembiyan bronzes.

== Honored ==
From an inscription of Parakesarivarman Uttama Chola, we know that a regular śribali ceremony has been arranged at the UmaMahesvarasvamin temple at Konerirajapuram every month on the day of jyeshta, the natal star of the queen:

As many as 4,151 kalam of paddy and lands, whose measurements are given in great detail, were provided for, in order to maintain the regular service in the temple, such as..the śribali-ceremony held on the natal star jyeshtha of queen Sembiyan-Madeviyar, feed brahmanas,..

== Sacred ==
Sembiyan Mahadevi was a consummate temple builder and a highly respected patron of the arts. During her lifetime, special celebrations marked her birthday in the Shiva(Śiva) temple in the town of Sembiyan Mahadevi, named after her, and a metal portrait of the beloved queen was presented to the temple in her honor, possibly commissioned by her son. As such, it would have been recognized as Sembiyan Mahadevi by its use in processions celebrating her birthday. This highly stylized bronze image is an instance of the blurring of lines between royal and divine portraiture in ancient Indian art. The pose is reminiscent of the goddess Parvati. Indian artists often portray Hindu deities with great attention to arm/hand details to emphasize their omnipresence and omnipotence. A variety of hand gestures, known as mudras, are used to express the mood and meaning of the images of the gods. For instance, when the palm is raised to face the worshiper, it is the gesture of protection (abhaya), while a lowered hand with the fingers pointing downward signifies a promise to grant the devotee's wishes (varada). The contrapposto pose, known in India as tribhanga, or triple-bent, was a popular stance; it produced a sense of swaying movement, and most images, whether human or divine, are thus poised.

== Visual metaphor ==
A metaphor in literature juxtaposes two seemingly unrelated things to highlight certain important aspects of one of them. The same is possible in visual art. With all exaggerated features, Sembiyan Mahadevi bronze is not meant to be taken literally. Sembiyan Mahadevi is a visual metaphor yet the most elusive from neuronal and aesthetic perspective. According to Ramachandran the exaggerated features of Sembiyan Mahadevi are meant to symbolize specific divine attributes.

== See also ==
- History of Tamil Nadu
