= Parantaka II =

Chola emperor from 958 to 973

Parantaka II Chola
- Rajakesari Varman; Maduraikonda Rajakesari Varman; Pon Maaligai Thunjiya Thevar

Chola Emperor
- Reign: 958–973
- Predecessor: Gandaraditya Chola
- Successor: Uttama Chola

Co-Regent of the Chola Empire
- Reign: 957 (few months)
- Emperor: Arinjaya Chola
- Predecessor: Gandaraditya Chola
- Reign: 955–958
- Emperor: Gandaraditya Chola
- Successor: Aditya II
- Born: Thanjavur, Chola Empire (modern day Tamil Nadu, India)
- Died: 980; Kanchipuram, Chola Empire (Modern day Tamil Nadu, India)
- Empress: Vanavan Madevi
- Issue: Aditya II; Kundavai; Rajaraja I
- Dynasty: Chola
- Father: Arinjaya
- Mother: Kalyani (princess of Vaidumba family)
- Religion: Hinduism

Parantaka II (r. 958–973) was the Chola emperor from 958 to 973. He is also known as Sundara Chola (lit. 'Beautiful Chola') as he was considered an epitome of male beauty. He was the son of Arinjaya Chola and queen Kalyani, a princess of Vaidumba family. Parantaka II ascended the Chola throne despite the fact that his cousin Madurantaka Uttama Chola, the son of Gandaraditya Chola (the elder brother of Arinjaya Chola) was alive and he had equal if not more claim to the Chola throne. During his reign, Parantaka Sundara Chola defeated the Pandyas, Ceylon and then recaptured the Tondaimandalam from Rashtrakutas.

When Parantaka II became king, the Chola kingdom had shrunk to the size of a small principality. The Pandyas in the south had revived their fortunes and had defeated the Chola armies and occupied their ancestral lands.

During Parantaka II's reign, the foundations were laid for the success of the Chola Empire a generation later. A few territories in the north were recovered. The Pandyan ruler Vira Pandya was defeated and Madurai was taken. An expedition was made to gain control of Sri Lanka but it was not successful and resulted in a friendly treaty. Parantaka II waged war against Rashtrakutas and successfully regained Tondaimandalam.

== Early life ==
According to the Anbil plates Arinjaya was succeeded by his son. After coming to power Sundara Chola aka Parantaka II first directed his attention to the south against Vira Pandya, who had repulsed Gandaraditya's attempt to restore Chola supremacy in the Pandya country.

== Pandyan War ==
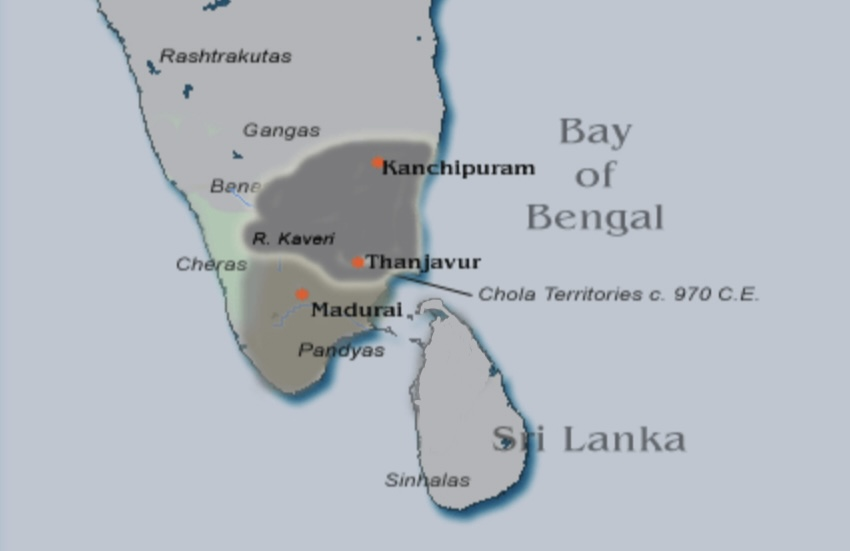
Territories under Parantaka II

Immediately after becoming king, Parantaka II's attention was directed towards the growing strength of the Pandyas in the south. Vira Pandya, having repulsed Gandaraditya's attempts to restore Chola supremacy in the Pandyan kingdom, was ruling as an independent potentate. The invading Chola army met the Pandyas at Chevur.

The Leyden copperplate inscriptions tell us in that war, "Parantaka II caused rivers of blood to flow". Other inscriptions mention that Parantaka and his young son, Aditya Karikalan (also referred to as Aditya II) defeated Vira Pandya and made him flee to the hills surrounding the battlefield. The young son Aditya, who took to the battlefield at the age of "twelve" and who was a "veera abhimanyu" in valour, is profusely praised for having conducted himself in battlefield with as much ease as he was at "military training sessions".

It is also possible that Aditya Karikalan killed Vira Pandya in that battle. Aditya's inscriptions use the epithet "Vira Pandyan Thalai Konda Aditya Karikalan" - "...took the head of Vira Pandya". After the Battle of Chevur, Parantaka II's armies continued their thrust into the Pandya country.The especially wicked nature of this coalition is noted by chola panegyrists to be "wicked force of age of kali, that were duly uprooted by the king.". As a procedure for de-recognizing the rogue kingdoms Parantaka II also seized the royal insignia of pandyans like fish emblem, throne, gem studded crown and ancient pearl necklace.

Sundara Chola called himself Maduraikonda Rajakesari, that is the Royal Lion who took Madurai and Madhurantaka (destroyer of Madurai) in order to commemorate his victories over the Pandyas.

Although the Chola armies won the battle, the war was still not won. Parantaka II did not succeed in re-establishing the Chola power over the Pandya lands.

== Success against Rashtrakutas (Recovery of Tondaimandalam) ==
Parantaka II next concentrated in his war against Rashtrakutas. Some documents provide an interesting account of military acumen and gallantry exhibited during the war by a certain chola commander belonging to one of the 98 divisions of troop velaikkaras. The commander who is praised to be a devotee at feet of lord at thillai and who was "a very murugan at war", is credited to have on two occasions unexpectedly defeated large enemy battalions. According to some sources, this commander gave up his uniform at the direction of the divine at tirruvottriyur, taking the name ottriyur atikalar and turning to doing good works on saiva siddantam.

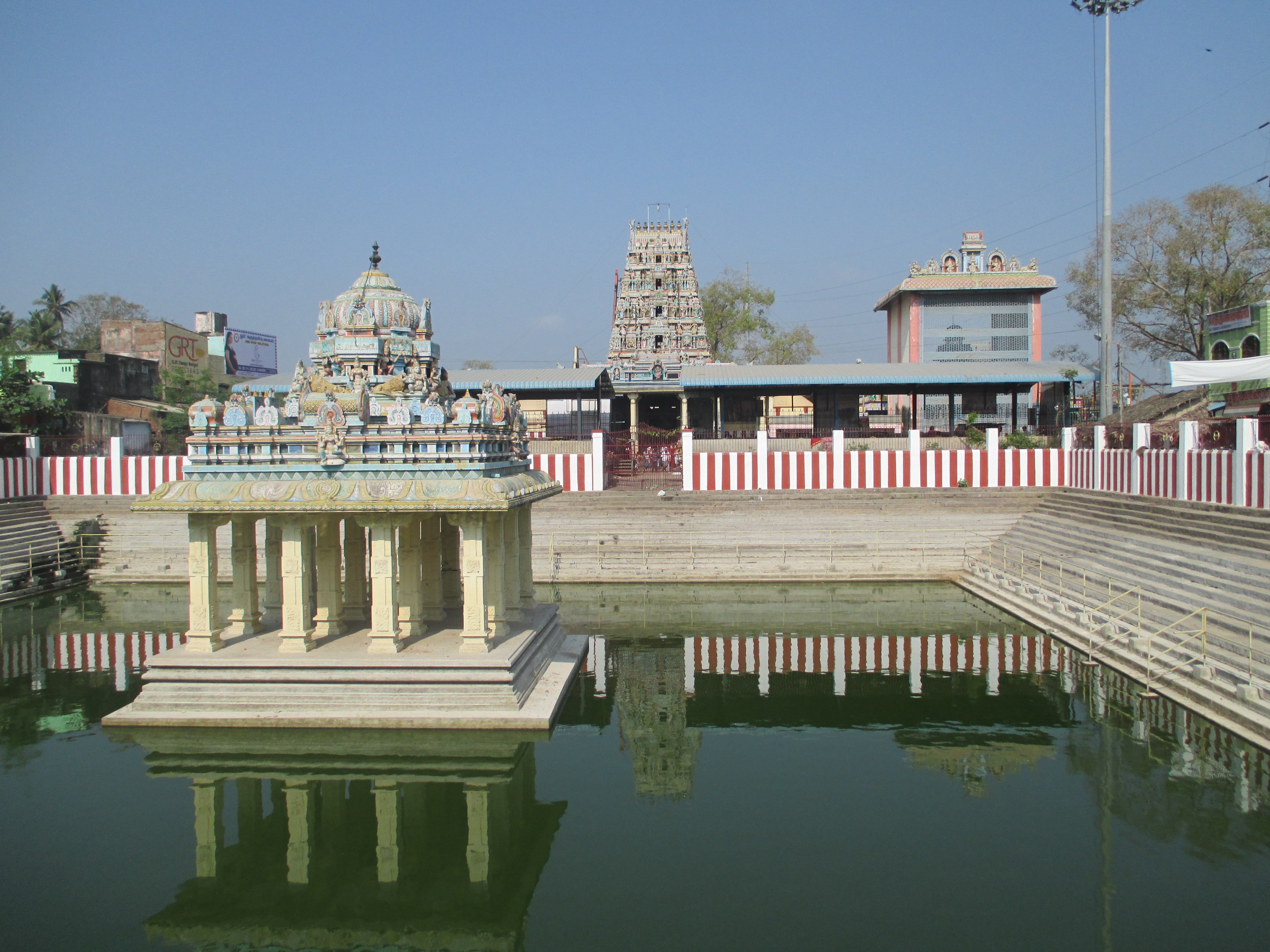
Central shrine at Vedapureeswarar temple

== Expedition against Pandyan and Sri lankan Alliance ==
After the battle of Chévür in which Vīra Pandya sustained a bad defeat, the Chola forces led, among others, by Parāntakan Siriyavēļār of Kodumbālür, continued the campaign into the Pandya country, and forced Vīra Pandya to seek refuge in the forests. According to the Chola account the Pandya sovereign was on this occasion also supported by Ceylonese troops in his endeavour to resist the Chola aggression, thus Mahinda IV sent his troops to support the Pandyas. But in the end both the troops were defeated and routed by the Cholas. This battle is skipped in the Sri Lankan chronicles but it is supported by some historians while being unmentioned, though not rejected by some other historians .

== Sri Lankan Expedition ==
Sundara Chola Parantaka also waged war against the Sinhala ruler in Sri Lanka. The expedition was led by many of his generals and his relative the Irukkuvel chief and Parantaka Siriyavelar the general of Chola there he fell fighting before the ninth year of Sundara Cõļa, A.D. 965 and they made a friendly treaty with the ruler of Lanka.

== Aditya II’s (Karikala's) Assassination ==
Parantaka II's last days appear to have been clouded by a personal tragedy, as his son and parakesi Aditya II was assassinated by a group of conspirators. The Udayarkudi inscription, made by one Bharathan alias Vyazha Gajamallan, names Soman, Ravidasan alias Panchavan Brahmadirajan and Paramesvaran alias Irumudi Chola Brahmadirajan as the conspirators/traitors responsible for the assassination.

There is also a conjecture by one R.V. Srinivasan made in 1971 that Rajaraja I and his sister Kundavai were the underlying forces instrumental in liquidating of Aditya II. However, no physical evidence to support this claim has been found to date. Several historians and archaeologists, including Ka. Tha. Tirunavukarasu, K. K. Pillai, M. Rasamanikanar and A. Krishnaswami, rejected the attribution of Aditya II’s assassination to Rajaraja I or Uttama Chola.

== Uttama’s ascension ==
After the assassination of Aditya II, it seems that Uttama forced Parantaka II to make him the heir-apparent. Arulmozhivarman (or Rajaraja I), Parantaka II's second son did not protest, anxious to avoid a civil war. It was apparently part of the compromise that Uttama was to succeed the throne only if he accepted to be succeeded, not by his own children but by Arulmozhivarman. The Thiruvalangadu copperplate inscription states that Madhurantaka Uttama Chola made Arulmozhi the heir-apparent.

== Parantaka II's death and legacy ==
Parantaka II, heart broken by the personal tragedy died in Kanchipuram at his golden palace (c. 980 CE). He was thereafter known as "Pon maligai thunjina thevar" – "the king who died in the golden palace". Parantaka II continued the chola legacy of absolutely professional and democratic management. This is seen from many inscriptions of his and his illustrious son Aditya II, which describe reforms carried out professionally at universities, councils, military and navy. Parantaka was well supported by his management councillors. Thus we know from an inscription of his how a certain Aniruddha Brahmarayan who was a follower of jaiminiya sutra of samaveda (jaiminiya sutrattu aniruddha bhramarayar) and who was a "servitor at the feet of lord of river girt arankam (srirangam), i.e lord vishnu", who belonged to royal council being felicitated for selfless service.

One of his queens, Vanavanmahadevi, a princess from the clan of Malaiyaman, committed suicide by jumping into the fire, in spite for several oppositions by the noble men at the king's death and her image was perhaps installed at the Thanjavur temple by her daughter Kundavai. Another queen, a Chera princess survived him until 1001 CE.

During Parantaka II's reign, literature Tamil received encouragement. The Buddhist work on Tamil grammar, Virasoliyam eulogises him as a patron of letters and of Buddhism. The eulogy furnishes evidence for the friendly relationship between the Chola monarchs and the Buddhists.

== Inscriptions ==
The following is an inscription of Parantaka II from the Sivayoginathar Temple in Thiruvisanallur,

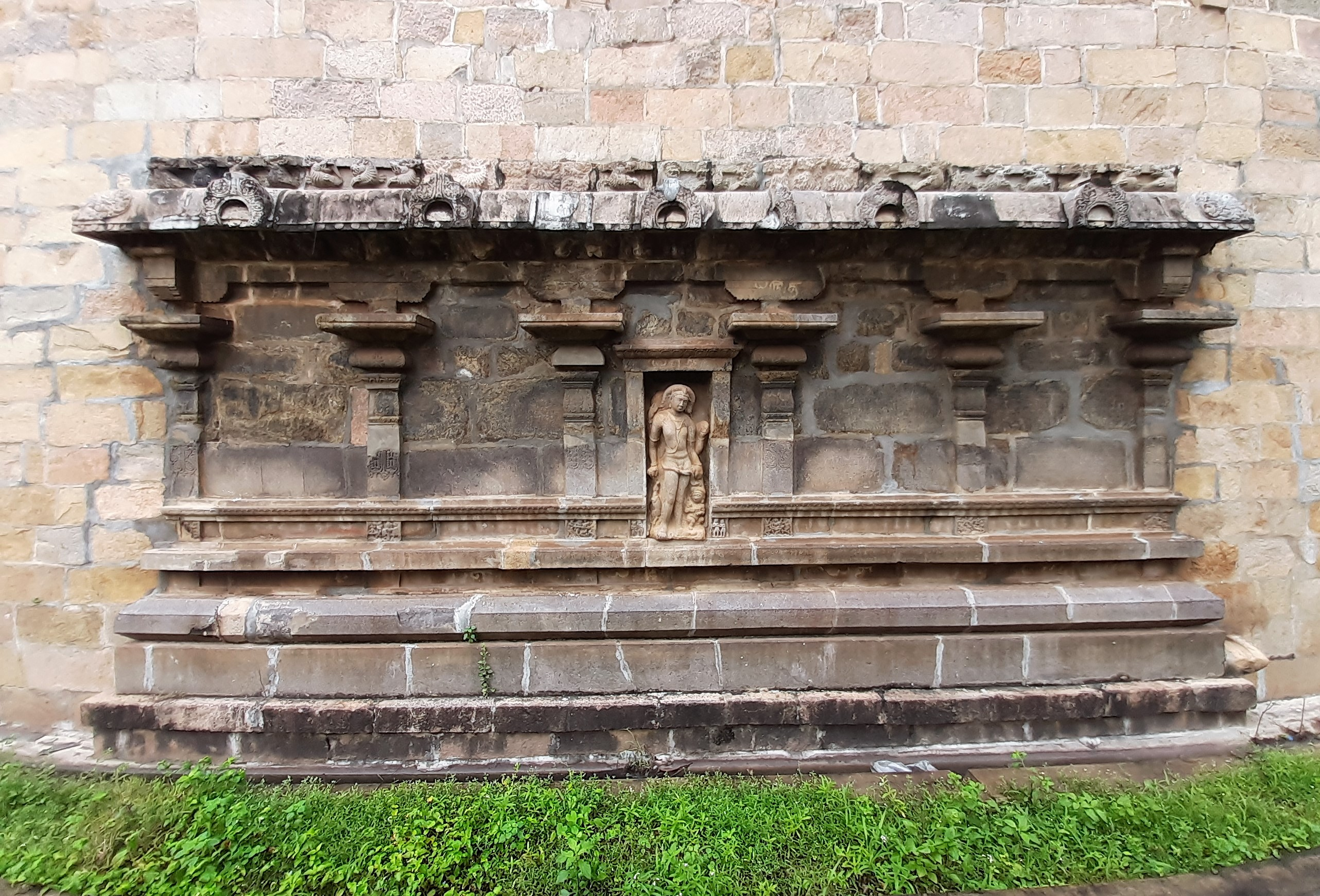
Sculptures at Sivayoginathar Temple

(Verse 2) ..The King named Siruvela who was the light of the Irungola race and foremost(member) in the family of the daughter of the (king) Pirantaka gave with delight a lamp to Hara(Siva) whose abode was at Srivisalura.

(Verse 3) May the Maheswaras protect the lamp presented with delight in the prosperous fifth year of(reign of) the best of kings, the illustrious Sundara Chola, by him who bore the name Siruvela, to Isa(Siva) who was pleased to dwell in the abode (temple) of Srivisalura(situated) in the virtuous village named Nimbagrhara on the northern bank of the (river) Kaveri.

The term foremost in the family of the king Pirantaka's daughter indicates the alliance between the Chola and Irukkuvel families and the chief Siriyavela might have been the King's son-in-law or his daughter's father-in-law.

Here is another inscription of Parantaka II from the Vedapureeswarar temple in Tiruverkadu (north wall of the central shrine),

A record in the seventh year of the Perumal Sundara Choladeva, who drove the Pandya into the forest.

Records gift of lands for offerings to the temple of Srikudittittai-Udaiyar in Vadagarai-vembarrur by the king's general (senapati) Pirantakan Siriyavelar alias Tirukkarrali Pichchan.

== In popular culture ==
- Sundara Chola, forms a main character in Kalki Krishnamurthy’s 1955 historical fiction novel Ponniyin Selvan. In his story, Kalki imagines Parantaka II to be a powerless ruler - handicapped by a debilitating illness. He is caught between opposing forces of his love for his children and his dependence on powerful courtiers.
- Actor Prakash Raj plays his role in Ponniyin Selvan: I, Ponniyin Selvan: II which was directed by Mani Ratnam which is based on Kalki's novel.

== See also ==
- Thiruvilandur Copper Plate - a royal land-grant charter, issued during the reigns of Rajadhiraja Chola I and Rajendra Chola II.

== Notes ==
Preceded by Gandaraditya	Chola; 957–970 CE	Succeeded by Uttama Chola
