= Uttama (Chola dynasty) =

Chola emperor from 973 to 985

- Parakesari Varman
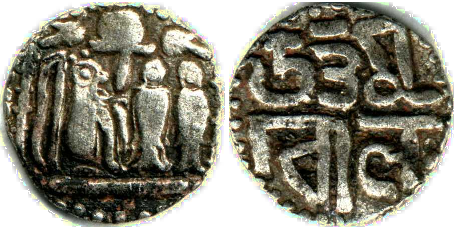

Chola Emperor
- Reign: 973–985
- Predecessor: Parantaka II
- Successor: Rajaraja I

Co-Regent of the Chola Empire
- Reign: 971–980
- Emperor: Parantaka II
- Predecessor: Aditya II
- Born: Madurantaka; Chola Empire (modern day Ariyalur, Tamil Nadu, India)
- Died: 985; Thanjavur, Chola Empire (modern day Tamil Nadu, India)
- Empress: Sorabbaiyar Tribhuvana Mahadevi, Kaduvettigal Nandippottairaiyar; Siddhavadavan Suttiyar
- Issue: Madhuranthaga Gandaradithan
- Dynasty: Chola
- Father: Gandaraditya
- Mother: Sembiyan Mahadevi
- Religion: Hinduism

Uttama, also known as Madhurantaka, was a Chola Emperor who ruled from 971 to 985 in present-day Tamil Nadu, India. According to Tiruvalangadu plates of Rajendra Chola, Madhurantaka Uttama's reign is placed after Aditya II. The latter may have been a co-regent of Parantaka II and seems to have died before he could formally ascend the throne. Uttama was the cousin of Parantaka II and was the son of Sembiyan Mahadevi and Gandaraditya.

== Controversial ascension ==
The circumstances in which Uttama ascended the Chola throne is surrounded by controversy and mystery. At the time of Gandaraditya's death, Uttama must have been a very young child. Due to his young age, his rights to the Chola throne were probably set aside and Gandaraditya's younger brother Arinjaya was crowned king.

Arinjaya ruled for a very short time – possibly for less than a year and on his death, his son Parantaka II (Sundara Chola) succeeded him. By this time, Uttama was old enough to claim the crown. Sundara Chola had two sons – Aditha Karikalan (who beheaded Vira Pandyan I in battle) and Arulmozhi Varman.

During the reign of Parantaka Chola II, his son Aditha Karikalan was appointed co-regent and heir apparent to the Chola throne, despite Uttama having a stronger claim. Aditha Karikalan was assassinated in 971 under mysterious circumstances.

The Tiruvalangadu plates of Rajendra Chola I reveal that following Aditha Karikalan’s death, questions arose regarding succession. Although the people favoured Arulmozhi Varman, he chose to step aside in favour of his paternal uncle, Uttama.

== Role in Aditya II’s Assassination ==
An inscription from the reign of Rajaraja I reveals that the properties of certain individuals were confiscated after they were convicted of treason. The inscription also indicates that these individuals were involved in the conspiracy to assassinate Aditya II. Dated to the second regnal year of Rajaraja Chola, the Udaiyargudi inscription records that the government seized the lands of several people and their relatives, including Soman, Ravidasan (alias Panchavan Brahmadhirajan), Parameswaran (alias Irumudichola Brahmadhirajan), and Malaiyanur Revadasa Kramavittan, along with the property of Kramavittan’s son and mother. This action was taken in response to their role in the murder of Karikala chola who took the head of the Pandya. Notably, Ravidasan and Parameswaran held government positions.

Despite Aditya II’s assassination in 971, no action appears to have been taken by Uttama Chola during his reign to bring the perpetrators to justice. In his authoritative work The Cholas, historian K.A.N. Sastry submitted that circumstantial evidence—based on an inscription at the Udayarkudi temple—implicates Uttama in the conspiracy.

However, subsequent research has challenged Sastry’s interpretation, suggesting he may have misread the inscriptions. It seems reasonable to conclude that if any credible evidence had existed against Uttama, Rajaraja’s son, Rajendra Chola, would not have adopted the coronation title of Madhurantaka II.

All indications point to Uttama being a devout and upright ruler. An ardent devotee of Shiva, inscriptions from Konnerirajapuram (also known as Thirunallam) and Kanchipuram reflect his piety. Under the guidance of his mother, Uttama played a significant role in codifying temple patterns, epigraphy, art, sculpture, and administrative record-keeping.

== Chola army and campaigns ==
Not much is known about the military conquests of Uttama, but by his time most of Thondaimandalam had been recovered from the Rashtrakuta. His dominions included Kanchi and Tiruvannamalai to the north. Many of his inscriptions are found in around Chengalpattu and North Arcot districts. The Chola army seems to have been in continued battles with the Pandyas and their ally the Sinhalas in Eelam or Sri Lanka. Several Chola coins of Uttama have been found in the Pandya country and in Eelam as proof of Uttama's activities there. We have a copper-plate inscription of him, now at the Government Museum Chennai. It bears the symbol of a seated tiger with two fish beside it and bears the line This is the matchless edict of the King who taught justice to all the Kings in his realm. But the genealogical section of the plates was lost. However, we do have the appendix portion at the end.

There are indications he upgraded the army, not just in troop levels but also in quality and organization. It is known through inscriptions that, at least from Uttama's time, warriors were provided with waistcoats of armour.

An important general during his reign was Paluvettaraiyar Maravan Kandanar, who also served under Sundara Chola. His son Kumaran Maravan also served Uttama.

== Personal life ==
Uttama was the son of Gandaraditya Chola and Sembiyan Mahadevi, who was the daughter of a Malavarayar chieftain. Uttama had several queens, some of whose names are known. His chief queen was Orattanan (Urattayana) Sorabbaiyar Tribhuvana-Mahadeviyar. Other queens included Kaduvettigal Nandippottairaiyar, likely a Pallava princess, and Siddhavadavan Suttiyar, who was related to Vikramasola-Miladudaiyar, a prominent feudal king ruling over Miladu (part of present-day South Arcot District).

Uttama was named Gandan Madhurantakan, also known as Uttama, by his father after his paternal uncles. Unlike some other Chola kings, Uttama took after his mother and was known for his piety. His devout nature and support allowed Sembiyan Mahadevi to continue her temple restoration work. Uttama is remembered for his compassion, even towards his enemies.

As with most ancient Indian kings, Uttama was religiously tolerant. Although a Shaivite (worshipper of Shiva), he also donated to temples dedicated to Vishnu, especially to the Ullagaladar temple. He also granted large degrees of autonomy to his districts. He brought in the best talent from other kingdoms. Kachipeedu (modern Kanchipuram) is also mentioned as one of his prominent cities. He is known to have contributed money, cattle, sheep to temples in modern Kumbakonam, Thirunallam (modern Konnerirajapuram), Thiruvallarai, Thirupatturai, Thirunedugalam, Thiruvisalur, Thirunaraiyur, Thiruvalangadu, Thirukkodika, etc.

Uttama's mother pioneered the process of kalpani—converting brick, mortar, and wooden structures into granite, and there is inscriptional evidence to show that he actively funded his mother in this work. She made a conscious effort to copy the older inscriptions before she re-built the temple, for example in a temple in Aavatuturai which was sung by the Moovar, that is the Saivite saints, Appar, Sundarar and Sambandhar there is an older inscription from the time before the temple was rebuilt. At other places like the Choleeswara temple at Kurralam which was sung by Appar and Sundarar, there is an inscription that says it was built by Sembiyan Mahadevi She survived this king and lived on for another 16 years into the reign of Rajaraja I.

Two sculptures of Uttama (Madhuranthaka Devar) and his mother can be found in the Southern wall of the inner Prakara of the Konnerirajapuram (a.k.a. Thirunallam) temple near Kumbakonam. The inscription under the sculpture identifying Sembiyan Mahadevi identifies her, and the Archaeological Survey of India interprets the bearded man behind her as Gandaraditya Chola.

== Death and succession ==
Uttama died in 985. Although he had at least one son (Madhurantaka Gandaraditya), the line of succession passed back to Parantaka II's family. Rajaraja Chola I succeeded as the Chola Emperor. Madhurantaka served as an official in Rajaraja's court.

== Inscriptions ==
The following is an inscription of Uttama from the Umamaheswaraswami temple in Konerirajapuram,

A record of the Chola king Madhurantakadeva alias Uttama Chola.

Records that the temple of Tirunallamudaiyar was built of stone by Madevadigalar alias Sembiyan Madeviyar queen of Gandaradittadeva and mother of the king

Yet another inscription of him from the Masilamanisvara temple in Tirumullaivayil,

Dated in the reign of the Chola king Parakesarivarman alias Uttama Chola deva;

records in his fourteenth year, gift of land by Sembiyan Madeviyar, queen of Gandaraditta Perumal and daughter of Malavarayar. The lands were purchased from the villagers in Ambattur in Ambattur-nadu, a district of Pular kottam

Preceded by Sundara Chola	Chola; 970–985 CE	Succeeded by Rajaraja Chola I
