= Rajendra I =

Chola emperor from 1014 to 1044

- Parakesari Varman, Yuddhamalla, Mummudi Cholan, Gangai Kondan, Kadaram Konda, Jayasimha Kula Kaalan, Chalukya Chudaamani, Mannaikonda chola, Thelagaramari (Telungu Kula Kaalan), Rattapadi Konda Chola
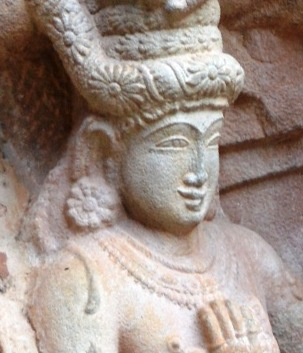
- Sculpture of Rajendra I represented as Lord Chandikeswara (Gangaikonda Cholapuram)

Chola Emperor
- Reign: 1014–1044
- Predecessor: Rajaraja I
- Successor: Rajadhiraja I

Co-Regent of the Chola Empire
- Reign: 30 May 1012 – 1014
- Emperor: Rajaraja I
- Successor: Rajadhiraja I

King of Dakkinadesa King of Ruhuna
- Reign: 1017–1044
- Predecessor: Kassapa VI
- Successor: Rajadhiraja I
- Born: Madhurantaka Chola; 26 July 971; Thanjavur, Chola Empire (modern day Tamil Nadu, India)
- Died: 1044 (aged 72–73); Brahmadesam, Chola Empire (modern day Tiruvannamalai, Tamil Nadu, India)
- Burial: End of 1044; Brahmadesam, Tamil Nadu, India
- Spouse: Tribhuvana (Vanavan Mahadevi); Puteri Onangki; Mukkokilan; Panchavan Mahadevi; Viramahadevi
- Issue: Rajarajan; Rajadhiraja I; Manukula Kesari; Sanga Varman; Rajendra II; Rajamahendran; Virarajendra; Arulmoli Nangaiyar Piranar; Ammangadevi
- Dynasty: Chola
- Military career
- Service: Chola Army; Chola Navy
- Service years: 992–1044
- Rank: Senathipathi (992–1014); Chakravarti (1014–1044)
- Battles / wars: Chola–Chalukya wars; Siege of Unkal; Battle of Donur; Battle of Tavareyaghatta; Battle of Chebrolu; Conquest of Banavasi; Conquest of Ededore; Conquest of Kulpak; Battle of Maski; Battle of the Godavari river; Reconquest of Vengi; Battle of Rohana (1017 CE); Annexation of Kalinga and Bengal, 1019–1024; South-East Asia campaign of Rajendra I; Invasion of Srivijaya, 1025; Chola invasion of Kedah; (see Rajendra's conquest chronology for a full list of battles and conquest)
- Father: Rajaraja I
- Mother: Vanavan Mahadevi alias Tribhuvana Mahadevi
- Religion: Hinduism
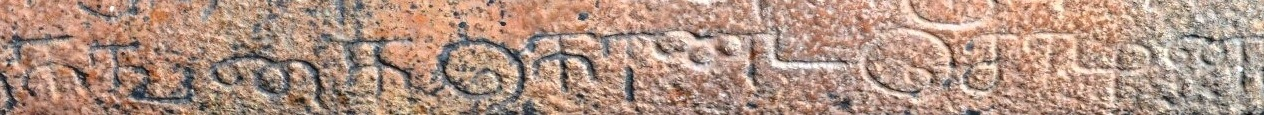
- Signature

Rajendra I (Note: (/rɑːdʒeɪndrə/; Middle Tamil: Rājēntira Cōḻaṉ; Classical Sanskrit: Rājēndradēva Śōla; Old Malay: Raja Chulan) (26 July 971 – 1044), often referred to as Rajendra the Great, (Note: Also known as Gangaikonda Cholan (Middle Tamil: Kaṅkaikoṇṭa Cōḻaṉ; lit. 'Bringer of the Ganges'), and Kadaram Kondan (Middle Tamil: Kaṭāram Koṇṭāṉ; lit. 'Conqueror of Kedah').) was a Chola Emperor who reigned from 1014 to 1044. He was born in Thanjavur to Rajaraja I. His queen was Vanavan Mahadevi and he assumed royal power as co-regent with his father in 1012 until his father died in 1014, when Rajendra ascended to the Chola throne.

During his reign, the Chola Empire reached its zenith in the Indian subcontinent; it extended its reach via trade and conquest across the Indian Ocean, making Rajendra one of only a few Indian monarchs who conquered territory beyond South Asia.

In his early years, Rajendra was involved in the Chola Army, with which he fought in several campaigns against the Western Chalukyas and the rulers of Anuradhapura, earning him his first victories. He quelled rebellions in the Chera and Pandiya vassal states, and in Sri Lanka. As Emperor, Rajendra completed the conquest of Ruhuna and brought an entire portion of Sri Lanka under imperial rule. Rajendra recovered the Pandya royal insignia, which had been kept in Ceylon by Rajasimha II and had not been recovered by his predecessor Parantaka I. Rajendra expanded Chola rule by defeating the kingdoms of Kalinga and Vengai, and subduing the islands of Laccadives and the Maldives, which he renamed Munnir Palantivu Pannirayiram ("Twelve Thousand Islands and the Ocean Where Three Waters Meet"). These islands were later used as strategic naval bases. During his South-East Asia campaign, he annexed Srivijaya, Kedah, Tambralinga and Pegu, achieving imperial dominance in the region and strengthening Indian influence in Southeast Asia.

Rajendra conducted a war against the Pala dynasty and captured a great deal of wealth, which he used to build the city of Gangaikondacholapuram, the capital of the Chola Empire, and one of the centers of trade and commerce in the empire for several centuries. The city was remarkable for its artificial lake, extensive fortifications, moats surrounding the imperial palace, and the Brihadisvara Temple. Rajendra was a follower of Shaivism but welcomed Buddhism and built several stupas across South-East Asia and South India.

New forms of trade emerged during Rajendra's reign such as the commercial system called "emporia," this was after the Chola's had gained control of Strait of Malacca and several other coastal areas. Emporia refers to exporting goods according to their demand, arose, making trade within the Empire profitable and helped maintain the Chola military. The Khmer Empire was a major ally and trading partner, and helped the Cholas expand their networks as far as Song China. This link allowed Rajendra to incorporate Chinese vessels into the Chola Military. These networks also extended west; the Cholas engaged in the spice trade with Arabia, North Africa, Anatolia and Turkic peoples.

Rajendra Chola I was succeeded by his son Rajadhiraja I, who ruled from 1044 to 1054.

== Early life and ascension ==
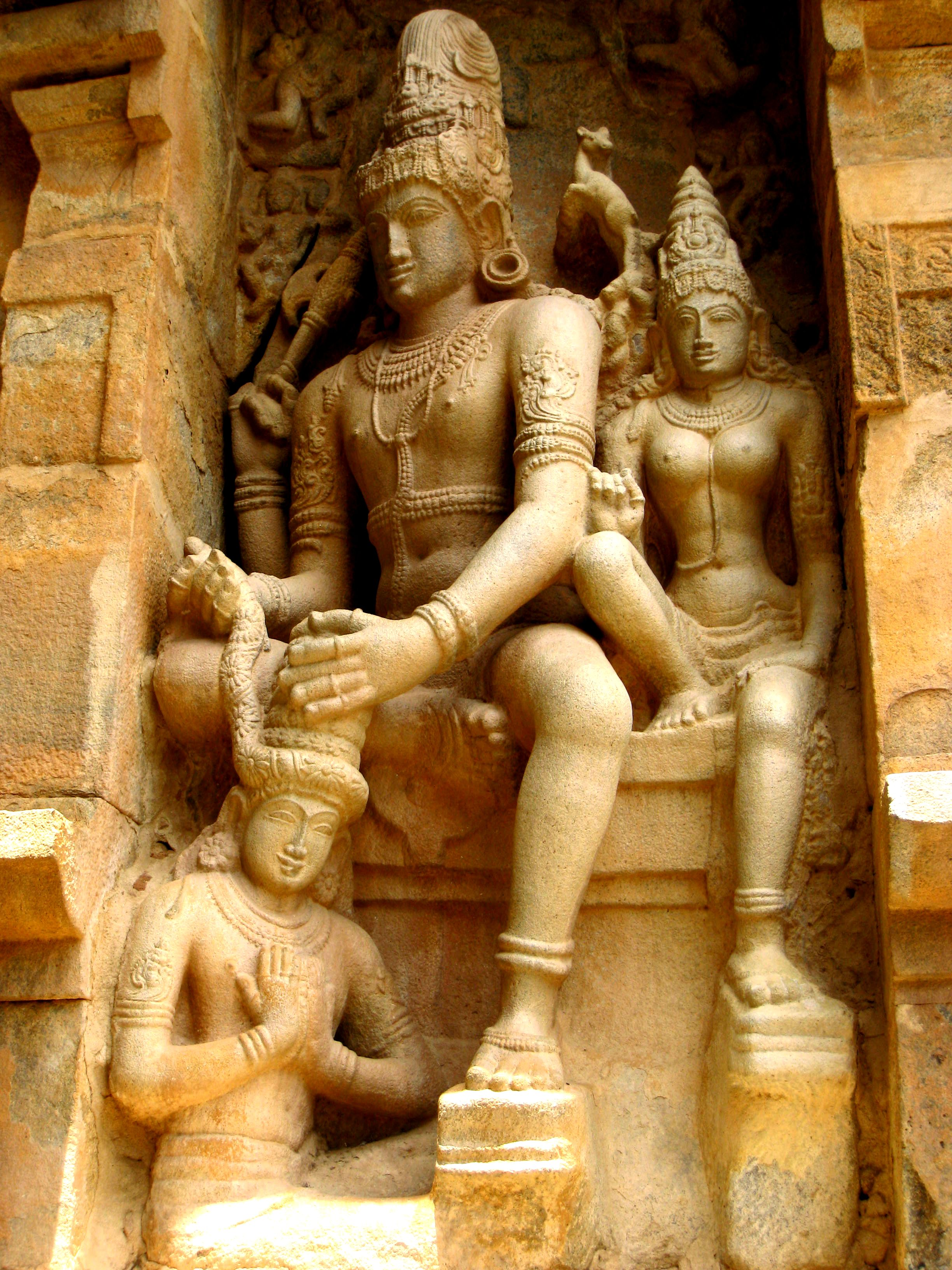
Depiction of Shiva and Parvati crowning Lord Chandikeswara

The exact birth date of Rajendra I is unknown; it is speculated he was born around 971 CE. He was the son of Rajaraja I and queen Vanathi, who is also called Thiripuvāna Mādēviyār. Rajendra had a younger brother named Araiyan Rajarajan, who became a commanding general of a Chola army, and at least three sisters; the younger sister was Kundavai (not to be confused with Kundavai Pirattiyar), the queen of Chalukya-Vimaladitya; and a daughter called Mahadevi. Other significant members of the royal household include queen mother Dantisakti Vitanki—alias Lokamahadevi. The nakshatra of Rajendra's birth was Thiruvathirai (Ardra).

Rajendra was declared heir apparent and formally associated with his father in the administration of the Chola Empire in the final years of his father's reign (1012–1014). In 1018, Rajendra appointed his son Rajadhiraja as heir apparent or co-regent to the Chola throne, which Rajadhiraja occupied from 1018 to 1044.

== Military conquests ==
The Chola Empire at its greatest extent c. 1030, under Rajendra I

On his father's behalf Rajaraja I, Rajendra I started his wars on the Indian mainland when he was a co-regent for his father in an expedition in 1012 with the capture Iditurai-nadu, (Ededore 2000), (was a stretch of country between the rivers Krishna on the north and Tungabhadra on the south, comprising a large part of the present Raichur doab) and Banavasi (in western Mysore in Karnataka). He then directed his attention to Kollipaakkai(Kulpak), about 45 miles northeast of Hyderabad in Telangana and captured it in 1013.

In about 1014 - 1015 CE, Rajendra led a war against the Rattapadi in northern Karnataka and southern Maharashtra. Rajendra was successful in striking at the heart of the Chalukyan Empire and sacking and destroying capital Manyakheta. He also captured Malkheda on behalf of his father, which met this reversal after its initial capture by Rajaraja Cholan in 1006. With the death of Rajaraja Cholan I in 1014 CE and the ascension of Rajendra to the Chola throne in the same year. After a lapse of two years, in 1016, Rajendra sent a naval force to Sri Lanka and brought the Ruhuna Kingdom under his control.

Following an expedition to eastern Kerala in 1017, Rajendra captured Kudamalai Nadu.

In 1018, Rajendra's forces captured the Maldives and Lakshadweep islands, and the same year captured Sandimaaththivu, the Kavaratti island west of Kerala.

In 1019, Rajendra sent another expedition against the Rattapadi, northern Karnataka and southern Maharashtra. With its new capital at Kalyan in northernmost Karnataka, which the Cholas lost again but recaptured after Battle of Maski in eastern Karnataka. After a two-year lapse, Rajendra, with his capture of many regions of the Indian mainland, became more ambitious in conquering the northern and north-western parts of India.

He commenced his war expedition in this direction in 1021, capturing Sakkarakkoattam in the south of Chhattisgarh. Then, he sent part of his forces to the Ganges river in the north and the other in a north-westerly direction. At the same time, he stationed himself at Sakkarakkoattam until the two expeditions were complete.

The second expedition went to Uttarapatha and Gangetic region countries towards the Ganges river in the north from Sakkarakkoattam; they captured the regions of Odda Vishayam and Thandabuththi in Odisha, Kosala Naadu in northern Chhattisgarh, Thakkana Laadam and Uttara Laadam in Jharkhand, and Vangala Desam in modern-day Bangladesh, and reached the Ganges.

The Chola Indian Mainland expedition ended in 1022, and details of the countries conquered by his forces in the expedition were included in his Meikeerthi's from 1023. With the return of Rajendra Chola's forces to the Chola capital in 1022, the Royal Guru of Rajendra, Isaana Pandithar, built Gangaikonda Cholaeswarer temple at Kulampandel, Tamil Nadu. With his return, Rajendra claimed a new title, "Gangaikondaan", and gave the title "Gangaikonda Cholan" (the Chola who captured Gangai) to his younger brother, who led the Gangetic expedition. Rajendra commenced the construction of a new city named "Gangaikonda Cholapuram", with a new Siva temple named "Gangaikonda Cholaeswarem" and a large temple water tank called "Chola Gangam", where the holy water brought from the Ganges river was mixed. The Essalam Copper Plates of Rajendra state with the conquest of the Gangetic region, Rajendra constructed the new city of the Gangaikonda Cholapuram, the great Gangaikonda Choleswarer temple, and the sacred Cholagangam Tank at the Udaiyar Palaiyam region of Ariyalur district. In the temple "Gangaikonda Cholaeswarem" he built, the presiding deity of the Karuvarai (Sanctum Sanctorum) called the "Gangaikonda Cholaeswarer" also known as "Peruvudaiyar" – the God Siva in the form of Lingam, the biggest Lingam among the Siva Temples in the world over, having a height of 13 feet (4.0 m) and a circumference of 20 ft (6.1 m). The praśasti mentions Rajendra's conquests:

On the third Regnal year of Rajendra Chola – the conqueror of the East country, Ganges and Kadaram; this stone inscription was made to record the tax exemption grant given by Rajendra, the one who surrendered to Shiva.

The Vijayamkonda Cholaeswarem Siva temple of Erumbur in Cuddalore district – the present-day Kadambavanesvara temple near Erumbur – was built to commemorate the victory of Rajendra's forces over Sri Vijaya and many regions of Sumatra. The Kadaremkonda Cholaeswarem Siva temple in Kudimallur in Vellore district – present-day Bhimeswara temple near Kalavai – was built to commemorate Rajendra's victory over Kadarem and many regions of present-day Malaysia.

Rajendra I's overseas war expedition commenced in 1023; a large fleet of ships with Chola warriors was sent to Sri Vijaya, Palembang in southern Sumatra, which was captured. After that, the fleet captured the adjacent settlement Malaiyur. From there, the fleet sailed to the nearby island Bangha and captured Mevilibangham. The fleet then sailed to Pannai, on the eastern Sumatran mainland, followed by Ilamuridesam in northern Sumatra. The forces next sailed to Malaysia and captured Vallaipandur in modern-day north-east Malaysia and Kadarem in north-west Malaysia. From here, Rajendra's forces sailed north and captured the adjacent settlement Ilankasokam in south-east Thailand, followed by Mathamalingam, eastern Thailand and Thalaitakkolam in south-west Thailand. From here, the fleet departed to India, en route capturing Manakkavaarem in the Andaman and Nicobar Islands, the southern Myanmar (Burma) seaport city Magpapaalam, and returned to Chola country. The Chola south-east Asian expedition ended in 1024, and details of the lands conquered by his forces in this expedition were included in his Meikeerthan early silver kasu of 1025. With Rajendra's victory over Sri Vijaya(m) of Sumatra in 1023, he built a Siva Temple at Erumbur, Tamil Nadu, and named it Vijayamkonda Cholaeswarem.

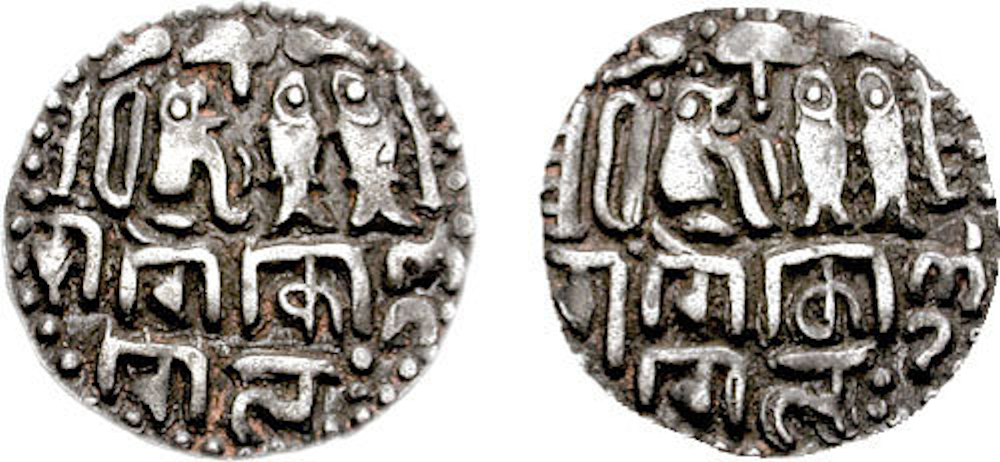
Coin of Rajendra containing Devanagari script

With his triumph over the Kadaram, Rajendra assumed the new title "Kadaremkondaan", and one of his grandsons who led the Kadaram expedition was given the title "Kadaremkonda Cholan" (the Chola who captured Kadarem). A region of the present-day Kudimallur, Tamil Nadu, was named "Kadarekonda Cholapuram". Some villages in present-day Tamil Nadu still bear the names Kidarankondan in Thiruvaarur and Ariyalur regions (present Gedaramkondan in Ariyalur) and Kadaramkonda Cholapuram (present Narasingpuram). With Rajendra's victories over Kadaram, Malaysia, in 1023, he built a Siva temple in northern Tamil Nadu and named it Kadaremkonda Cholaeswarem.

Following Rajendra's victories in the wars on the Indian mainland and near-overseas, he built two "magnificent & gigantic temples completely out of Granite stone" as living monuments of his forces' great valour and superior status in this region, which are included in the UNESCO World Heritage Series. The two granite temples were built to commemorate their triumphs far overseas and as monuments of the Chola's achievements in South-East Asia and the high status of the Medieval Chola Empire in the world history of that period (1025 CE).

=== Rajendra's conquest chronology ===
Timeline	Conquests	Result
992–1040 CE	Chalukya–Chola wars	Chola victory: Cholas annexed several territories of the western Chalukyas
1007 CE	Siege of Unkallu	Chola victory: Rajendra Chola I captured the fort of Unkallu (modern Unkal). After subduing Banavasi and Kadambalige, the Cholas defeated the defending commander Lenka Keta and secured control over western Chalukya territories.
1007 CE	Battle of Donur	Chola victory: Cholas successfully raided Banavasi, Donur (in the Bijapur region), unkal (near modern Hubli), Kudala sangama and parts of the Raichur Doab and secured Gangavadi and Nolambavadi.
993–1017 CE	Conquest of Anuradhapura	Chola victory: Cholas annexed the entirety of Sri Lanka, Anuradhapura Kingdom king Kassapa VI becomes his puppet ruler
1018–1019 CE	Conquest of the Chera Kingdom and Pandya Kingdom	Chola victory: Cholas annexed the Cheras and Pandyas
1018 CE	Conquest of the Maldives, Kavaratti and Lakshadweep islands	Chola victory: Cholas annexed the Maldives, Kavaratti and Lakshadweep islands
1020 CE	Battle of Maski	Chola victory: Cholas raid and sacked Malkheda, then annexed the Raichur district from the Western Chalukya Empire.
1021 CE	Recovery of Vengi	Chola victory: The Cholas defeated Vijayaditya who was supported by Jayasimha II, and Rajaraja Narendra was installed on the Vengi throne.; Coronation of Rajaraja Narendra in Vengi
1021 CE	Conquest of the Kalinga	Chola victory: Cholas annexed region of Kalinga
1019 - 1021 CE	Conquest of the Ganges	Chola victory: Cholas annexed Vangadesam (Bengal) and Odda (Odisha)
1021 CE	Chola conquest of Chandra dynasty	Chola victory: Chandra dynasty conquered by the Cholas
1023-1025 CE	Chola conquest of the Nicobar island	Chola victory: Chola colonization of the Nicobar islands; Nicobar island becomes a base of the Cholas to launch deeper expeditions into Southeast Asia from.
1023–1025 CE	Conquest of Pegu	Chola victory: Cholas annexed the city of Pegu (Myanmar)
1025 CE	Conquest of the Srivijaya Empire	Chola victory: Srivijaya (Parts of Indonesia and Singapore) and other surrounding tribal kingdoms colonized by the Cholas.
1025 CE	Chola conquest of the Langkasuka kingdom	Chola victory: The kingdom is occupied by the Cholas.
1028 CE	Chola invasion of Kedah	Chola victory: Entire Malay Peninsula sacked and conquered by the Cholas
1035 CE	Reconquest of Vengi	Chola victory: The Cholas defeated the Western Chalukya armies and drove them out of the Telugu country.; Rajaraja Narendra was reinstated to the Vengi throne.

== Battles in southern India ==
=== Early campaigns ===
Rajendra led campaigns from 1002 CE; these include the conquest of the Rashtrakutas and the campaigns against the Western

Life-size bronze statue of Rajendra Chola I

Chalukyas. He conquered the Chalukyan territories of Yedatore – a large part of Raichur district between the Krishna and the Tungabhadra rivers – Banavasi in north-western Mysore and the capital Manyakheta. Rajendra erected a Siva temple at Bhatkal. He also conquered Kollipakkai, located north of Hyderabad in present-day Telangana. An excerpt from an inscription in Tamil from Kolar states:

In the eighth year of the reign of Kopparakesarivanmar sri Rajendra Sola Deva, who, while the goddess of Fortune, having become constant, increased, and while the goddess of the great Earth, the goddess of victory in battle and the matchless goddess of Fame, having become his great queens, rejoiced-that in his extended lifetime, conquered with his great war-like army Idaiturai-nadu, Vanavasi(i.e., Banavasi) shut in by a fence of continuous forests; Kollipakkai, whose walls were surrounded by sulli trees; Mannaikkadakkam(i.e., Manyakheta) whose fortification was unapproachable.

In 1018 and 1019 CE, Rajendra invaded and conquered the Pandya and Chera Perumal kingdoms. He appointed one of his sons as viceroy with the title Jatavarman Sundara Chola-Pandya with Madurai as the headquarters in charge of both Pandya and Chera/Kerala. As per inscriptions on a memorial stone, Rajendra took the highway Rajakesari Peruvazhi to reach the Chera Nadu from Chola Nadu.

=== Chola–Chalukya wars ===
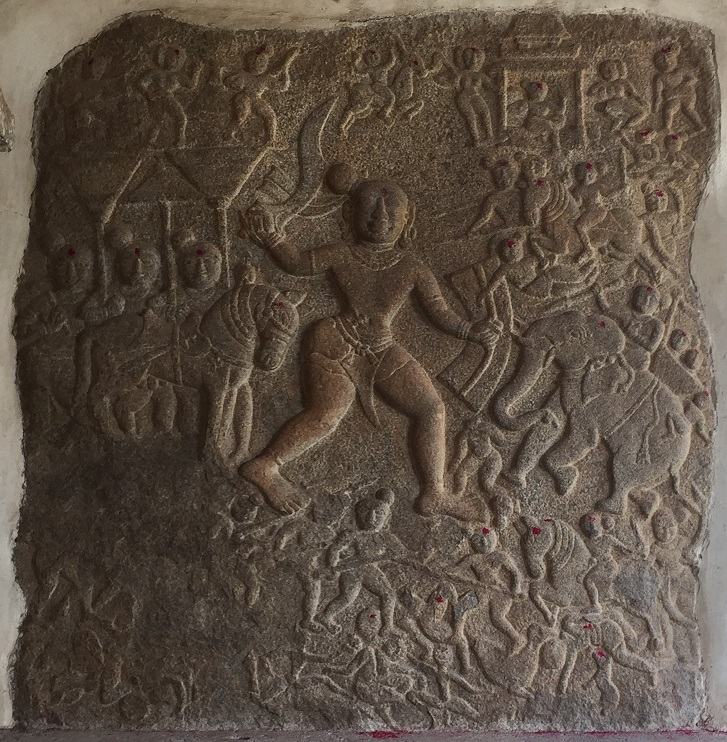
Rajendra in Battle, Kolaramma Temple, Kolar

Rajendra Chola I fought several battles with Western Chalukyas. From 992 CE to 1008 CE, during the reign of Rajaraja I, Rajendra raided and annexed several towns, such as Rattapadi, Banavasi and Donur (Bijapur District).

Tailapa II and his son Satyashraya, who were opponents of Raja Raja Chola I and Rajendra Chola I, ended up being defeated at Annigeri and at Kogali respectively.Jayasimha II was defeated in Kadambalige.Raja Raja Chola I invaded the Chalukya territory in 1003 - 1004 AD, and Achieve victory in many battles. Raja Raja Chola I Defeated Satyashraya in pitched some battles and from cut of the treasures that he captured from him the temple at Thanjavur was enriched.Tiruvalangadu plates of Rajendra Chola, state that Raja raja defeated Satyashraya who "fled to avoid misery from the attack of his (i. e. Arunmolivarman’s) ocean-like army, (still) misery found a (permanent) abode in him. In this Battle Satyashraya brother prince Dasavarman seems to have killed and Chalukya general dandanayaka Kesava was taken prisoner.

=== Siege of Unkal ===
Raja Raja Chola diverted attention from Vengi affairs to the Satyashraya to counteroffensive and sent an army under Crown Prince Rajendra Chola in Chalukya Country. Rajendra marched with a 900,000-strong army and Captured Santalige, Kadambalige, Banavasi, Kogali and besieged the fort of Unkallu in the modern Unkal district located in the Dharwad district. In this ensuing battle, the Cholas defeated the Chalukyas, and the Chalukya commander, Lenka Keta, was killed. After Rajendra Chola successfully captured Unkallu Fort and then encamped at Donur.

=== Battle of Donur ===
Following the Siege of Unkallu Fort, Rajendra battled against Satyashraya, who was opposing him in Donur. Kulpak and Malkhed became the objects of attack. In the Battle of Donur Rajendra defeated Satyashraya and successfully raided Banavasi, Donur (in the Bijapur region), unkal (near modern Hubli), Kudala sangama and parts of the Raichur Doab (called Iditurainadu) and secured Gangavadi and Nolambavadi. A mandapa at Tiruvottiyur called Mannaikonda Chola was among the mementos of the Rajendra Chola campaign. Mannaikonda-Chola is described in inscriptions as a surname assumed in commemoration of his conquest of Manyakheta.

Hottur inscription attributed to Irivabedanga Satyashraya from Dharwad acknowledges his allegiance to the Western Chalukyas and highlights the Chola incursion. He accuses Rajendra Chola of leading a massive force of 955,000 soldiers and causing havoc in Donuwara(Donur in Bijapur district), blurring the ethical boundaries of warfare prescribed by the Dharmaśāstras.

=== Rattapadi Campaign ===
Kanyakumari Inscriptions State that, Madhurantaka alias Rajendra-Chola :

(Conquered Kuntala, made Manyakheta a playground for his armies; had the kings of Kuluta and Utkala slain and the chiefs of Kalinga and Vimsa destroyed; burnt Kataha).

In about 1014 - 1015 CE, Rajendra led a war against the Rattapadi in northern Karnataka and southern Maharashtra. Rajendra was successful in striking at the heart of the Chalukyan Empire and sacking and destroying capital Manyakheta. He also captured Malkheda on behalf of his father, which met this reversal after its initial capture by Rajaraja Cholan in 1007.The Kanyakumari Inscriptions, while recording the achievements of Rajendra Chola, state that the latter made Manyakheta the playground of his army.later, as Manyakheta’s loot was paraded in Thanjavur, Rajendra Chola declared that he had captured the ‘spotless fame’ of the Chalukyas, becoming a resplendent conqueror in his own right; he also proclaimed that he had fulfilled his father’s vow.

=== Vengi affairs ===
In 1015, Jayasimha II became the king of Western Chalukyas. He tried to recover the losses suffered by his predecessor Satyashraya, who fled his capital and was later restored to the throne by Raja Raja I as a tribute-paying subordinate. Initially, Jayasimha II was successful because Rajendra was busy with his campaigns in Sri Lanka. In 1021, after the demise of the Eastern Chalukyan king Vimaladitya of Vengi, Jayasimha supported Vijayaditya VII's claim to the throne against the claims of Rajaraja Narendra, the son of Vimaladitya and Chola princess Kundavai. Rajendra helped his nephew Rajaraja Narendra defeat Vijayaditya who was supported by Jayasimha II. On the Eastern front, Rajendra's general, Arayan Rajarajan, defeated Vijayaditya, who was supported by Jayasimha II. And Rajaraja Narendra was installed on the Vengi throne. Vengi was later the site of the coronation of Rajendra's nephew following his victories in the Chola expedition to North India.

=== Battle of Maski ===
Western front Rajendra led a 900,000-strong army and defeated Jayasimha II at the Battle of Maski in 1020 AD.Following battle rajendra recapture Gangavadi and annexed Raichur from Western Chalukyas. Rajendra fought Jayasimha II in the Battle of Maski.

Rajendra chola Tiruvalangadu copper plates states,

“( He captured) the seven and a half lakhs of Rattapadi(which was) strong by nature, and vast quantities of treasure, together with the inestimable reputation of Jayasimha II, who out of fear and to his great disrepute, turned his back at Musangi (i.e., Maski) and hide himself. ”

That lord of Rattarashtra (i.e., Jayasimha II) in order to escape from the fire of the terrible rage of the ornament of the Solar race (i.e., Rajendra Chola) took to his heels with fear, abandoning all (his) family riches and reputation.

"It may be no wonder that the fire of his anger burst into a flame as it came into contact with the descendant of Tailapa II . This, however, is strange that, having crossed the waters of all the oceans, it (the fire of his anger) consumed the enemy fuel"(dvisadindhana.)

(conquest of the quarters with a powerful army; invasion of the South, the Pandya country and the flight of the Pandya king to the Malaya hill; hia son Chola-Pandya left in charge of the kingdom; invasion of the Western region, crossing the Sahya and flghting with and defeating the lord of Kerala and leaving Chola-Pandya in charge of the west also; entry into Kanchi and conquest of Jayasimha II).

— Thiruvalangadu copper plates

While in this consequent Rajendra Chola I, he captured the whole of Rattapadi. In the battle at Musangi (Maski), as it is spelt in the inscriptions, and the description of this campaign states that Rajendra Chola started from Kanchipuram on his march against Chalukya Country; there was a fierce battle between the forces of Rajendra and Jayasimha II, Jayasimha turned back and fled to the forests, and Rajendra returned to his capital with much booty.

The Thiruvilandur Copper Plate of Rajadhiraja Chola I and Rajendra Chola II records,

Madhurantaka also known as Rajendra I, fought highly terrible war of mighty elephants with the king Vallabha (the Western Chalukya king Jayasimha). Unable to bear the heat of the fire of might of the Chola, and his formidable army, the Chalukya king Jayasimha flew away from war-front and turned fugitive .

— Thiruvilandur Copper Plate

=== Reconquest of Vengi ===
Rajendra Chola's nephew, Rajaraja Narendra Eight years after his coronation, the sovereignty of Vengi was changed. Rajaraja was driven out of the kingdom by his half-brother Vijayaditya in 1031 AD. Vijayaditya could not have overcome his brother and seized Vengi, and the only power that could have helped him in the enterprise was the Western Chalukya monarch Jayasimha II. The Western Chalukya general invaded Vengi and captured the city of Bezwada(Vijayawada). So Rajaraja Narendra sought help in the Chola court. Soon Rajendra Chola sent an army under his general, the Brahman general Rajaraja Brahma Maharaja, together with two other officers. The Chola army marched on Vengi and attacked the western Chalukyas in the village of Kalindindi. The battle ended indecisively, as both side generals who were engaged in the fight on either side, perished on the battlefield, neither side could claim victory. but the Cholas failed to secure Rajaraja Narendra to the Vengi Throne. Therefore, in 1035 CE, Rajendra Chola sent another expedition to Vengi under his son and co-regent, Rajadhiraja I. Rajadhiraja Succeeding and defeating the Western Chalukya armies and driving them out of the Telugu country. Once again Rajaraja Narendra was installed on the Vengi throne.

== Conquest of Anuradhapura ==
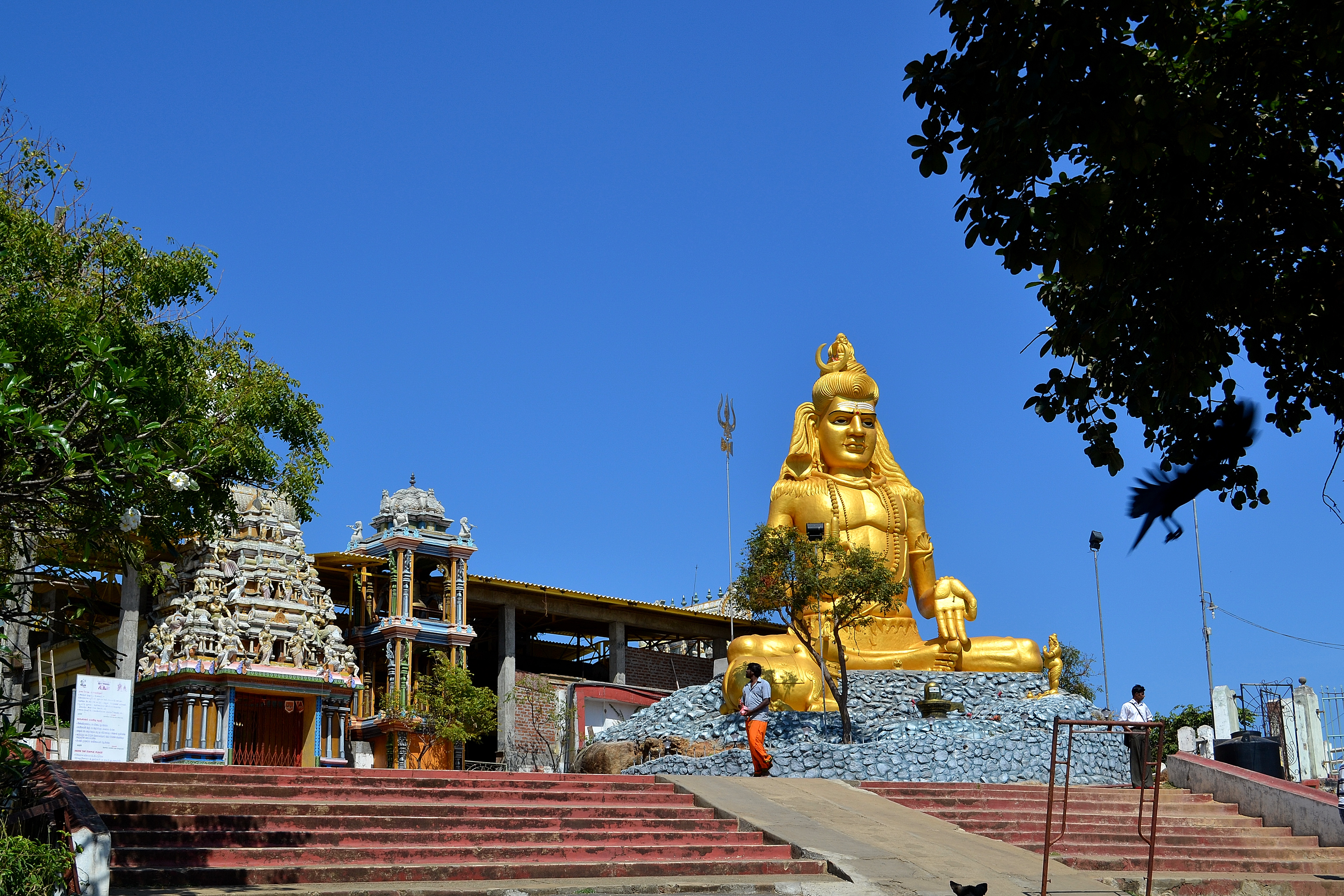
The Koneswaram temple in Trincomalee was expanded by Rajendra.

Under his father Rajaraja I, Rajendra Chola I's commander Vallavaraiyan Vandiyadevan commanded an army that invaded Sri Lanka and sacked the capital city Anuradhapura. The new Chola capital was at Polonnaruwa, which was renamed "Jananathamangalam", a title of Rajaraja. Chola official Tali Kumaran erected a Siva temple called Rajarajeshvara ("Lord of Rajaraja") in the town Mahatittha – modern Mantota, Mannar – which was renamed Rajaraja-pura. Chola-occupied territories on the island were named Mummudicholamandalam after Mummudi Chola or Rajaraja I, Rajendra's father.

During his reign, Rajendra's father Rajaraja I annexed the Kingdom of Anuradhapura in northern Sri Lanka. Rajendra invaded the Kingdom of Polonnaruwa in the south in 1017. Chola raids were launched southwards from Rajarata into Rohana. By his fifth year, Rajendra claimed to have completely conquered the island. The whole of Anuradhapura, including the south-eastern province Rohana, was incorporated into the Chola Empire. According to the Sinhalese chronicle Mahavamsa, the conquest of Anuradhapura was completed in the 36th year of the reign of the Sinhalese monarch Mahinda V – about 1017 to 1018. But the Cholas never consolidated their control over the south of the island, which lacked large, prosperous settlements to tempt long-term Chola occupation. Under Rajendra, the Chola's predatory expansion in Sri Lanka approached a point of diminishing returns. According to the Culavamsa and Karandai plates, Rajendra led a large army into Ruhuna kingdom and Ruhuna was incorporated into the Chola Empire and captured Mahinda's crown, queen and daughter, a vast amount of wealth and the king himself, whom Rajendra took to India as a prisoner to India, where he died in exile in 1029.

The Thiruvilandur Copper Plate records,

Taking recourse to the intricate śabdālaṅkāras, i.e. figures of speech based on words and sounds, such as alliteration of words (chekānuprāsa), indirect speech (chekokti), double entendre (śleṣa), etc., the poet tells us this (v. 35). Having conquered the Simhala country (Sri Lanka), that is protected by the oceanic trench all around, he (Rajendra I) seized the crown of Rāma (Rājasimha, the Pāṇḍya king) that had come to be deposited here in Sri Lanka. He did this feat as if he seized the might and splendour from the enemy of all kings (i.e. the Simhala king and the demon Rāvaṇa)—the splendour and the crown that had remained unseized by Rāma, i.e. Saṅgrāma Rāghava, Parāntaka I (and by Rāma, the hero in the Rāmāyaṇa).

— Thiruvilandur Copper Plate

=== Aftermath ===
11–12 years after the Chola conquest of Rohana, Prince Kassapa, son of Mahinda, hid in Rohana, where Chola forces unsuccessfully searched for him. Soon after the death of Mahinda, Kassapa assumed the Sinhalese monarchy as Kassapa VI – also known as Vikramabahu – and reigned in Rohana from 1029 to 1040 while attempting to organise a campaign of liberation and unification. He became the king of Rohana after the 11–12 years of Chola rule in Rohana. Taking advantage of uprisings in the Pandya and Chera kingdoms, which seems to have no effect in this conflict, 2 Sinhala dandanayakas by the names of Budha and Kiththi defeated the Chola garrisons (on behalf of Kassapa IV) in a 6 month long battle at Palatupana in Rohana. The soldiers of the 95,000-strong Chola army withdrawn to Pulatthinagara across dhakkina principality. Prince Kassapa IV launched an unsuccessful raid into Pulattinagara but died because of a disease before he could consolidate his power to a second raid into Pulattinagara. A series of non-sinhalese ephemeral aspirants to the throne subsequently appeared and disappeared in Rohana without dislodging the Cholas from the north. Kassapa VI's mysterious death in 1040, however, brought an end to the war until the rise of Vijayabahu. His successor Mahalana-Kitti (1040–1042) tried to lead a revolt against the Cholas but failed.

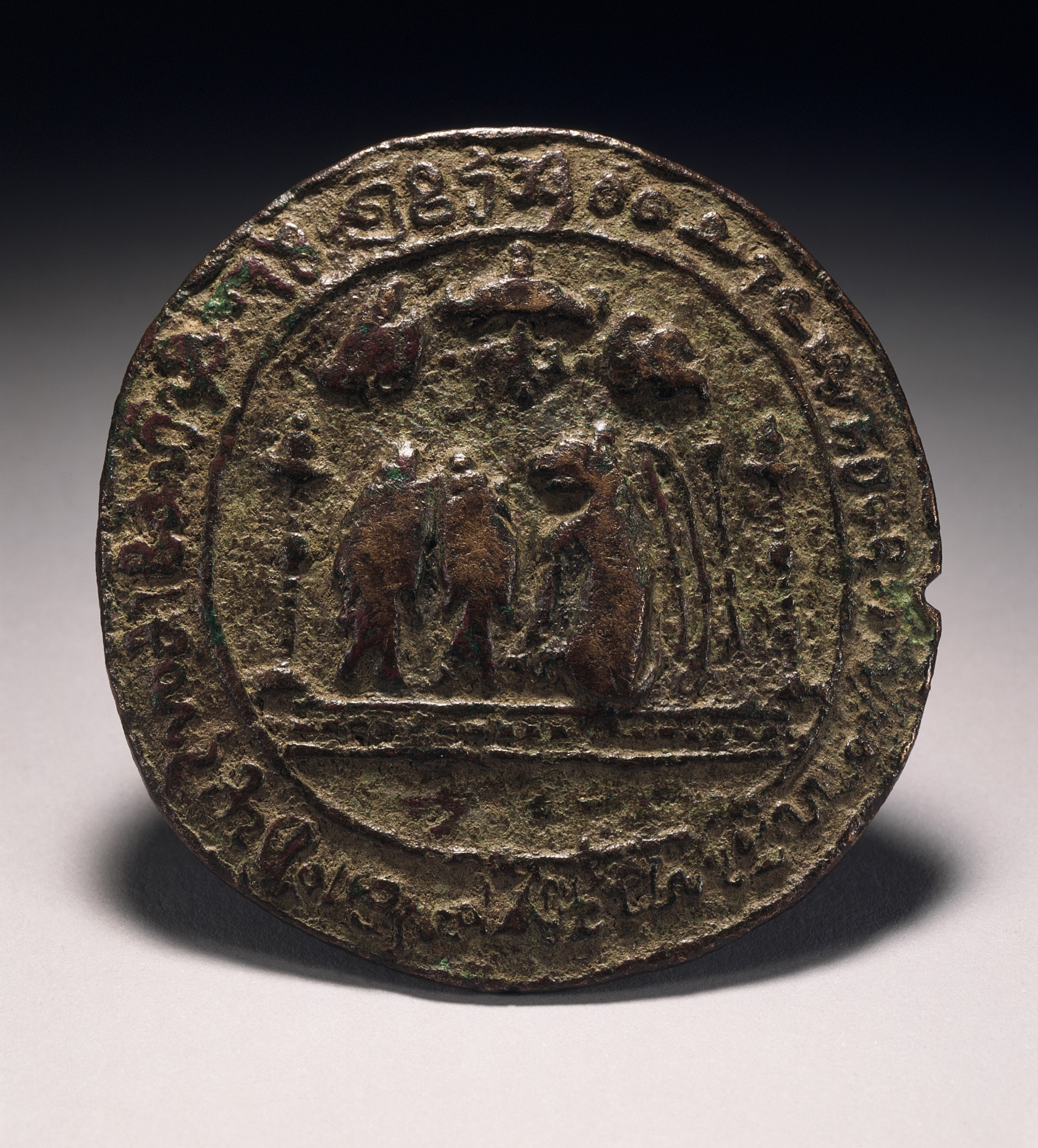
Seal of the Rajendra I

Vijayabahu I of Polonnaruwa I (1055–1110) descended from or claimed to be descended from the Sinhalese royal house, the House of Lambakanna II. By the age of seventeen, he had defeated his most-potent rivals in Rohana and was anxious to take on the Cholas. The crisis in the country left a few scattered, turbulent chiefs and intractable rebels whose allegiance, if any, was at best opportunistic, which proved a problem to both sides in the conflict, frustrating both the Sinhalese kings and the Cholas. Vijayabahu, from his base in Rohana, faced a similar difficulty; he had to contend with the hostility of local chiefs who regarded him as a more-significant threat than the Cholas to their independence. For that reason, the Cholas recruited nominal support from rebel chiefs in Rohana. Vijayabahu needed help consolidating a firm territorial base from which to launch a decisive campaign against the Cholas. On another front, the Cholas needed to eliminate similar opposition in the north. Gradually the wider conflict developed into a prolonged, back-and-forth struggle of raids and counter-raids; the forces of Vijayabahu advanced upon Polonnaruva, and then fell back to fortresses in Dakkhinadesa and Rohana to withstand retaliatory Chola attacks and sieges. The Chola reign over Sri Lanka persisted until 1070, the occupation ended in Chola withdrawal after a further series of indecisive clashes.

== Conquest of the Ganges ==
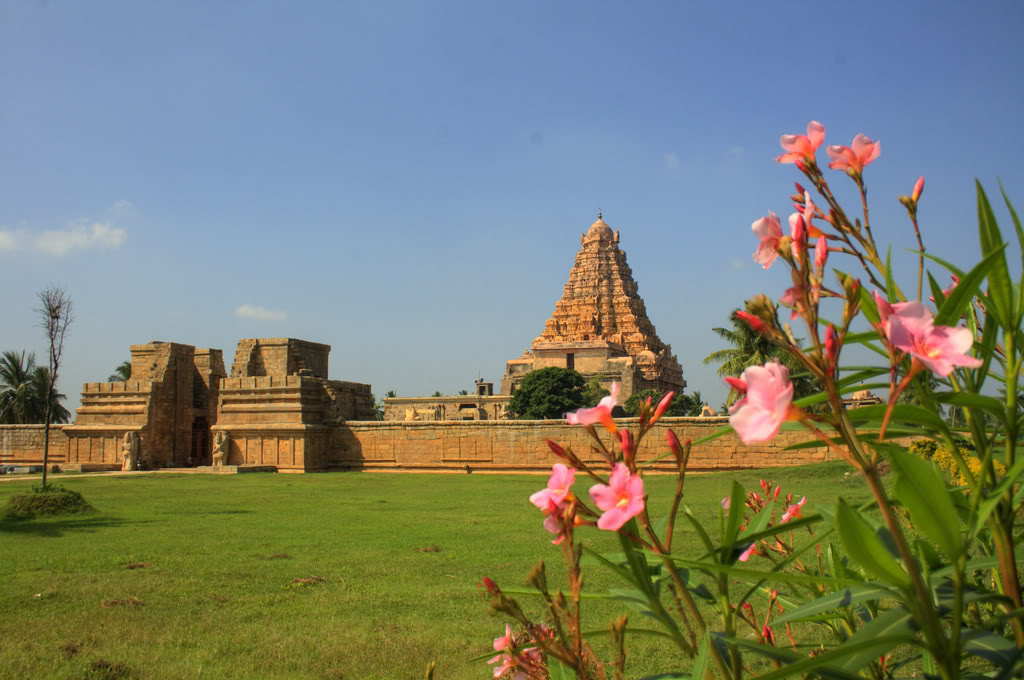
Gangaikonda Cholapuram was built by Rajendra to celebrate his success in the Ganges Expedition

=== Conflict with the Palas ===
In 1019 CE, Rajendra's forces marched through Kalinga towards the Ganges river. In Kalinga, the Chola forces defeated Indraratha, ruler of the Somavamsi dynasty. Rajendra accepted the help of the Paramaras and the Kalachuris, with whom Indraratha had a bitter enmity, and Rajendra took advantage of this situation. The combined armies defeated Indraprastha, who was probably killed. The Chola army eventually reached the Pala kingdom of Bengal, where they defeated Mahipala. The Chola army also defeated the last ruler of the Kamboja Pala dynasty, Dharmapala of Dandabhukti. The Chola army went on to raid eastern Bengal – modern-day Bangladesh – defeated Govindachandra of the Chandra dynasty, and invaded the Bastar region.

The Thiruvilandur Copper Plate of Rajadhiraja Chola I and Rajendra Chola II records,

Thereafter (Note: After the War with the Chalukya) the colossal powerful army of Rajéndra marched northward along the road towards the river Ganga, by crossing, with no difficulty, many rivers and mountains that were on the way. And this military march was witnessed and praised even by gods. Finally he and his army reached that river (v.33). There he got hundreds of golden pots filled with the water of the Ganga. Many kings, under the orders of Madhurantaka(Rajéndra), took upon their heads those golden pots of the Ganga waters and marched back towards his capital. Because in this manner they were made to bear the Ganga water on their heads, those kings became comparable, for a short period, to Lord Siva, the eminent Bearer-of -Ganga, i.e. Gangadhara Siva.

— Thiruvilandur Copper Plate

The Tamil praśasti of Rajendra I reads:

(He seized) Śakkarakkōţţam, whose warriors were brave; Madura-maṇḍalam destroyed in a trice, the prosperous city of Nāmaṇaik-kōṇam with its dense groves. Pañcap-paḷḷi whose warriors (bore) cruel bows, Māśunideśa with its green fields; a large heap of family-treasures with many (other) treasures (which he carried away), after having conquered Indraratha of the ancient race of the moon, together with (his) family, in a fight which took place at Ādinagar, (a city) whose fame knew no decline; Oḍḍa-viṣaya which was difficult of approach on account of its dense forest defence; the good Kōśalai-nāḍu where Brahmins assembled; Taṇḍabutti in whose gardens bees abounded, (land which he acquired) after having destroyed Dharmapāla (in) a hot battle; Takkaṇalāḍam, whose fame reached (all) directions, (and which he occupied) after having forcibly attacked Raṇaśura; Vangāḷa-deśā, where the rain water never stopped, (and from which) Gōvindacandra fled, having descended (from his) male elephant; elephants of rare strength, women and treasure, (which he seized) after having been pleased to put to flight in a hot battlefield the strong Mahipāla by the sound of a conch from the deep sea; Uttiralāḍam (on the shore of) the expansive ocean (producing) pearls; and the Gangā whose waters bearing flagrant flowers dashed against the bathing places (tirtha)

=== Gangaikondacholapuram ===
To celebrate his victory in the Ganges, Rajendra constructed a new capital at Gangaikondacholapuram and built Gangaikonda Choleeswarar Temple, which is similar to the Brihadeeswarar Temple at Thanjavur. There has been general disagreement among historians on the nature of the expedition. The copper-plate inscription of Rajadhiraja I and Rajendra II records that Rajendra I obtained hundreds of golden vessels filled with water from the Ganga. It states that, under the orders of Madhurantaka, many kings carried the vessels on their heads and returned to his capital. Early scholars such as V. Venkayya interpreted Rajendra's campaign to "bring the waters of the Ganges into Chola territory" as a pilgrimage to the Ganges river. This theory has been refuted by later historians, the most notable being K. A. Nilakanta Sastri. The military nature of the campaign is suggested by the last line of the Thiruvalangadu plates, which state the king erected the Cholaganga tank as a Ganga-jalamayam jayasthambham ("liquid pillar of victory).

The Chola expedition to the Ganges had a long-lasting influence. According to R. D. Banerji, a Kannadiga chief who accompanied Araiyan Rajarajan on his campaign settled in Bengal and founded the Sena Dynasty. It is believed the Karnata people of Mithila might have descended from soldiers of the Chola army. According to the Siddhantasaravali of Trilocana Sivacharya, many Shaivite Brahmins from Bengal were taken to Chola country, where Rajendra granted them lands. They eventually settled in Kanchipuram and the Cauvery Delta, forming the Sivacharya community.

The Thiruvilandur Copper Plate records,

This great king Rājendra established the city Gangaikonda Cholapuram, the most auspicious spot in the entire earth. He beautified this city with many lofty mansions, on the tops of which beautiful ladies of the houses were dancing in company with the god-ladies (amarāṅganās) joyfully (v. 36).

— Thiruvilandur Copper Plate

== Campaigns in South-East Asia ==
King Rajendra I Chola Charter issued by Rajendra I that declared the collection of revenue to build a Buddhist Vihara in Sriwijaya.

=== Invasion of Srivijaya ===
Srivijaya was a kingdom centred in Palembang, Sumatra, and was ruled by the Sailendra dynasty. During the reign of Mara Vijayatungavarman, Srivijaya had cordial relations with the Chola Empire during the reign of Rajaraja Chola I, leading to Mara Vijayatungavarman building the Chudamani Vihara in Nagapattinam. Sangrama Vijayatunggavarman succeeded Mara.

Khmer Emperor Suryavarman I started a war against the kingdom of Tambralinga on the Malay Peninsula, and requested aid from Rajendra. After learning of Suryavarman's alliance with Rajendra, Tambralinga requested aid from Srivijaya, which Sangrama granted. This led to the Chola invasion of the Srivijiya Empire. This belligerence were partly influenced by religion; the Chola and Khmer Empire were Hindu Shaivites, while Tambralinga and Srivijaya Empires were Mahayana Buddhists.

The Cholas are known to have benefitted from both piracy and foreign trade. Sometimes, Chola naval expeditions led to plunder and conquest as far as South-east Asia. While Srivijaya controlled two major naval choke points the Malacca and Sunda Straits, the Malacca Strait's north-west opening was controlled from Kedah on the Malay Peninsula side and from Pannai on the Sumatran side.

=== Other campaigns in South-East Asia ===
In 1025 CE, Rajendra's Chola forces crossed the Indian Ocean and invaded Srivijaya, attacking several places in modern-day Malaysia and Indonesia. The Cholas sacked the capital Kadaram and Pannai on Sumatra, and Malaiyur on the Malay Peninsula. Rajendra also invaded Tambralinga and the Gangga Nagara Kingdom in modern-day Malaysia and southern Thailand. Chola forces captured the last ruler of the Sailendra Dynasty Sangrama Vijayatunggavarman. The Chola invasion was the end of Srivijaya. Srivijaya's maritime power declined under the Chola attack. Chola forces conquered large portions of Srivijaya, including its ports Ligor, Kedah and Tumasik (now Singapore). The Chola invasion furthered the expansion of Tamil merchant associations such as the Manigramam, Ayyavole and Ainnurruvar into South-East Asia, and for the next century, Tamil trading companies from southern India dominated the region. Rajendra's expedition is mentioned in corrupted form as Raja Chulan in the medieval Malay chronicle Sejarah Melaya, and Malay princes have names ending with Cholan or Chulan, such as Raja Chulan of Perak. One record of Rajendra describes him as the King of Lamuri in north Sumatra. The Chola invasion led to the fall of the Sailendra Dynasty of Srivijaya also coincided with the return voyage of the Buddhist scholar Atiśa from Sumatra to India in 1025.

Despite the devastation, the Srivijaya mandala survived because the Chola attack was short and only meant to plunder so the invasion failed to install direct administration over Srivijaya. This invasion severely weakened the Srivijayan hegemony, and enabled the formation of regional kingdoms like Kahuripan and its successor Kediri, in Java, which were based on agriculture rather than coastal and long-distance trade. Sri Deva was enthroned as the new king and trading activities resumed. Deva sent an embassy to the court of China in 1028. The invasion was not followed by direct Cholan occupation, and the region was unchanged geo-politically, trade had considerable consequences. Tamil traders encroached on the Srivijayan realm that was traditionally controlled by Malay traders, and the Tamil guilds' influence increased on the Malay Peninsula and the north coast of Sumatra.

The Thiruvilandur Copper Plate records,

By massacring mercilessly the fourfold army of Kataha and overpowering the powerful master of that place, Rajéndra forcibly took possession of the enormous gold that had been amassed there (v. 37).

— Thiruvilandur Copper Plate

=== Aftermath ===
With the growing presence of Tamil guilds in the region, relations between Srivijaya and the Cholas improved. Chola nobles were accepted in the Srivijaya court, and in 1067, a Chola prince named Divakara or Devakala was sent as a Srivijayan ambassador to the Imperial Court of China. The prince, who was the nephew of Rajendra Chola, was enthroned in 1070 as Kulothunga Chola I. During the Kedah rebellion, Srivijaya asked the Cholas for help. In 1068, Virarajendra Chola launched a naval raid to help Srivijaya reclaim Kedah. Virarajendra reinstated the Kedah king at the request of the Srivijayan Maharaja, and Kedah accepted Srivijayan sovereignty.

== Death ==
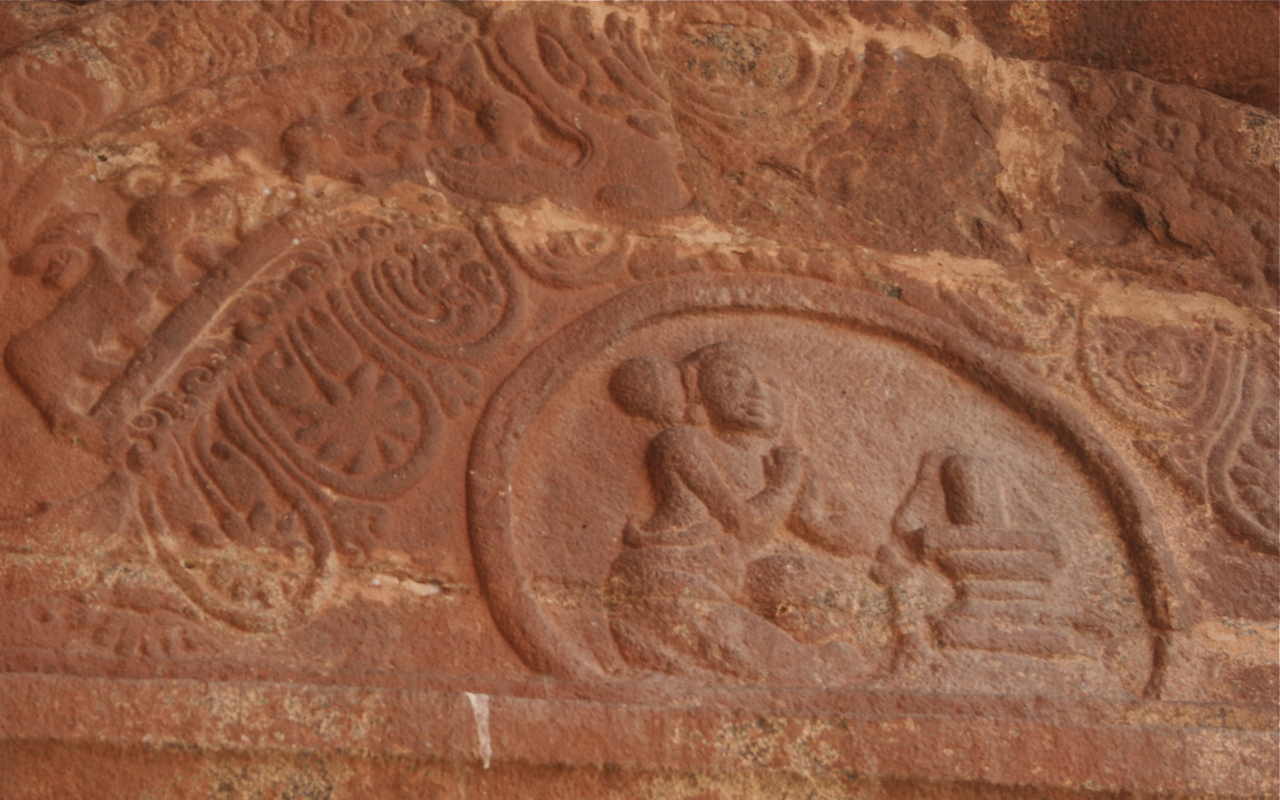
Rajendra Praying to a Shiva Lingam

Rajendra I died in 1044 in Brahmadesam, present-day Tiruvannamalai district, Tamil Nadu. Rajendra's son Rajadhiraja I recorded this information in an inscription, which states Rajendra's queen Viramahadevi committed sati upon her husband's death. Her remains were interred in the same tomb at Brahmadesam. It adds the queen's brother Madhuranthaka Parakesari Velan, who was a general in Rajendra's army, constructed a watershed at the same place in memory of his sister.

== Personal life and family ==
Sculpture of Rajendra with Middle Tamil Inscriptions

According to the Siddanta Saravali of Trilochana Sivacharya, Rajendra Chola I was a poet who composed hymns to praise the god Siva. A commentary on the same work says Rajendra brought several Saivas from the banks of the Ganges river and settled them in Kanchi and across the Chola Empire.

=== Titles ===
After his successful campaign for the Ganges river in North India, Rajendra gained the title Gangaikonda Chola (The Chola who took the Ganges river). After his successful South-East Asian campaign, he gained the title "Kadaram Kondan" (He who took Kedah).

He inherited the title Mummudi Cholan (Chola with three crowns) from his father Mummudi, a title used by Tamil kings who ruled the three kingdoms of Cholas, Pandyas and Cheras. Rajendra assumed other titles to commemorate his conquests, such as Mudigonda Cholan and Irattapadikonda Cholan.

Rajendra I bore the title Chalukya-Chudamani (Crest Jewel of the Chalukyas).

=== Family ===
Rajendra I had many queens; Tribhuvana or Vanavan Mahadeviyar, Mukkokkilan, Pahcavan Madeviyar and Viramahadevi, the last of whom committed sati upon Rajendra's death. He had seven sons; Rajarajan, Rajadhiraja, Manukula Kesari, Sanga Varman, Rajendra II, Rajamahendran and Virarajendra. Rajarajan was the eldest of the seven but died before reaching thirteen. Manukula Kesari died in 1021 during the war with the Western Chalukyas. Arulmoli Nangaiyar Piranar and Ammangadevi (queen of eastern Chalukya Rajaraja Narendra and the mother of Kulottunga I) are the known daughters of Rajendra.

The Thiruvilandur Copper Plate record that,

Rajendra Chola I's queen was Suddhamalli, (Note: The Thiruvilandur charter is the first known source to record that Rajendra had a queen named Suddhamalli and four sons by her.) meaning “pure jasmine”. Her parentage is not stated in the inscription. The couple had four sons: Rajaraja, Jayankonda Chola (Rajadhiraja I), Dabhrasabhaidhipa(Rajendra II), and Vira Chola, who are described as possessing virtues and characteristics equal to those of their father. Of the four, the eldest, Rajaraja, died at a young age. The king made his son Rajadhiraja I, the second son, the husband of Lakshmi, a princess of the Pandya dynasty, described as resplendent and adorned with large, pure ornaments. He also appointed Jayankonda, later known as Rajadhiraja I, as the lord of the Pandya dynasty's extensive fortune, indicating his appointment as Chola viceroy of the Pandya country (vv. 42–43).

— Thiruvilandur Copper Plate

== Issue ==
Name	Mother	Birth Date	Death Date	Notes
Rajarajan	Mukkokilan Adigal	988 C.E.	Unknown	Died at a young age
Rajadhiraja I	Mukkokilan Adigal	994 C.E.	1052 C.E. (aged 58)	Chola Emperor from 1044 C.E. to 1052 C.E.; Died in the Battle of Koppam against the western Chalukyas
Manukula Kesari	Tiribhuvana( Vanavan Mahadevi)	994 C.E	1021 C.E. (aged 27)	Chola Governor of the Cheras from 1018 C.E. to 1021 C.E.
Sanga Varman	Panchavan Mahadevi	995 C.E	1059 C.E. (aged 64)	Chola Governor of the Mummudichola Mandalam (Polonnaruwa) from 1024 C.E. to 1059 C.E.
Rajendra II	Mukkokilan Adigal	997 C.E	1064 C.E. (aged 67)	Chola Emperor, from 1052 C.E. to 1064 C.E., Retains his father's possessions and brother of Rajadhiraja I
Rajamahendra	Unknown	1000 C.E.	1060 C.E (Aged 60)	Co-Regent of the Chola Empire under his brother Rajendra II from 1056 C.E. to 1060 C.E.
Virarajendra	Mukkokilan Adigal	1002 C.E	1070 C.E. (aged 68)	Chola Emperor from 1065 C.E. to 1070 C.E. and King of Kadaram(Kedah) from 1067 C.E. to 1070 C.E.; Put down several rebellions in Kadaram and Sri Lanka but lost over Srivijaya.
Arulmoli Nangaiyar Piranar	Unknown	Unknown	Unknown	Queen of Kodumbalur King Elangovel Thrichirapalli
Ammangadevi	Unknown	Unknown	Unknown	Queen Consort of eastern Chalukya King Rajaraja Narendra; Mother of Chola Emperor Kulottunga I.

== Work and legacy ==
=== Temples ===
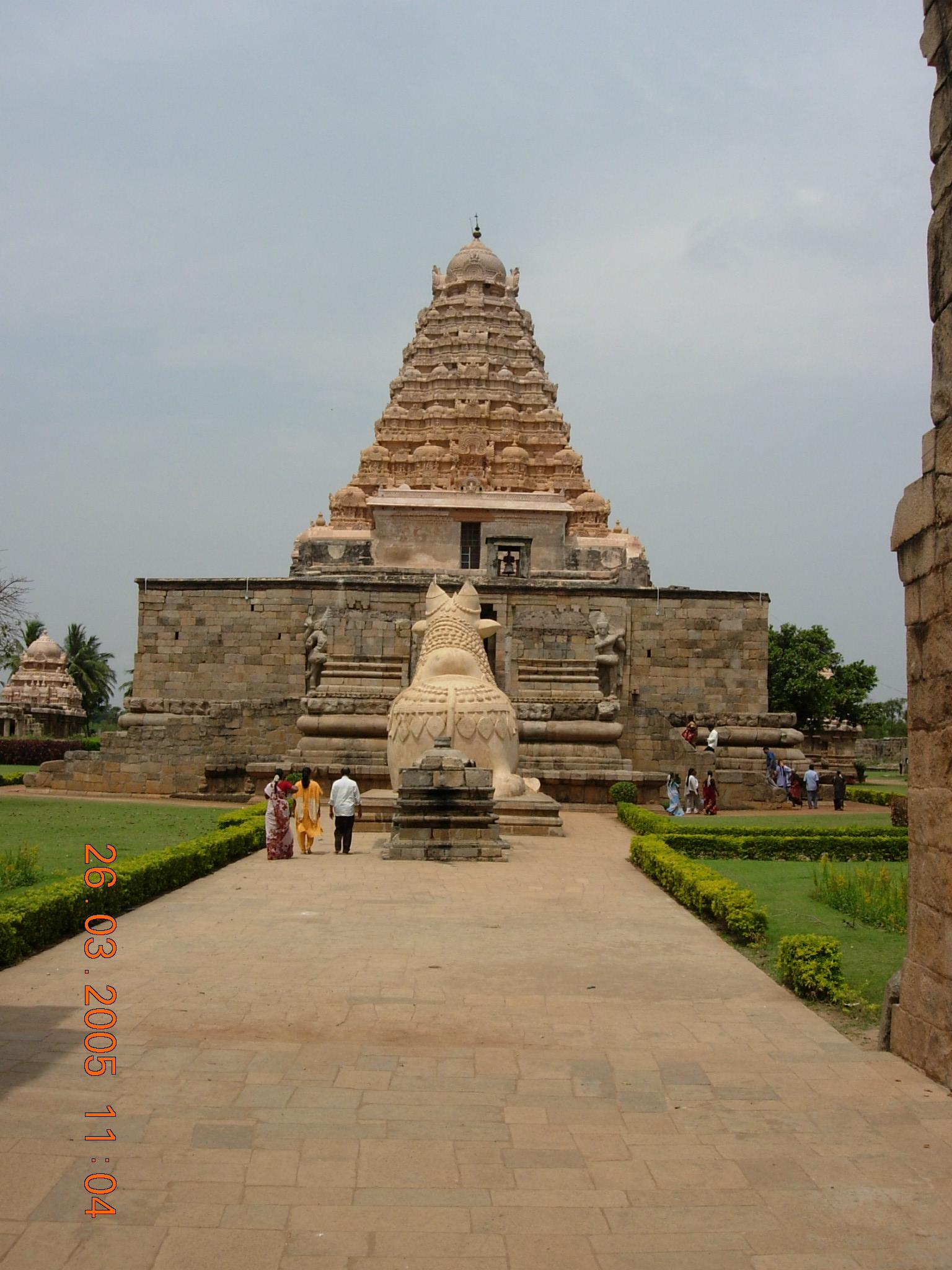
Brihadisvara Temple at Gangaikonda Cholapuram was modeled after the Brihadisvara Temple in Thanjavur.

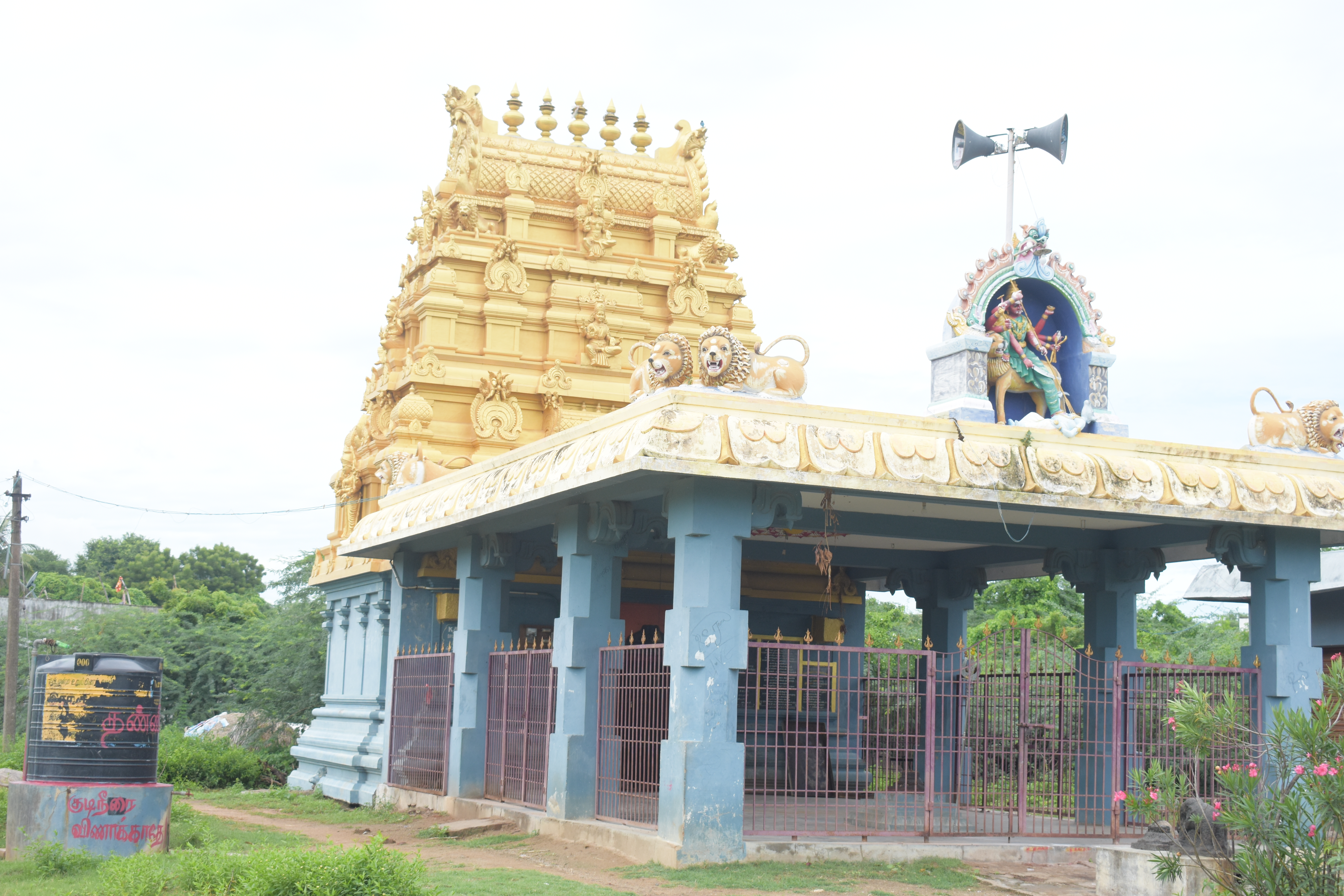
Pathirakali Amman Temple

Rajendra Chola I built several sites. Rajendra built Gangaikondacholapuram to commemorate his victory over the Pala Dynasty. The name of the city Gangaikonda Cholapuram means "The City of the Conqueror of Ganga River" or "the town of the one who defeated the kings near the Ganga". The city has an artificial lake, which is filled with water from the Kollidam and Vellar rivers. The outer fortification in the city is wider than the inner one. The remains of the outer fortification consists of a mound encircling the palace.

Rajendra established Gangaikonda Cholapuram as his capital from the mediaeval Chola capital Thanjavur, which became the capital for the next 250 years. Rajendra I built several temples using plans and infrastructure recommended in Tamil Vastu and Agama sastra texts. These included a Dharma Sasta, Vishnu and other temples. These temples were destroyed in the late 13th and 14th centuries, except the Brihadishvara temple. The other Chola landmarks are evidenced by soil-covered mounds and excavated, broken pillar stumps and brick walls found over several kilometres from the surviving temple.

Rajendra states Dehejia must have involved the same artisans used by his father and transferred them from Thanjavur. Most or all of the Chola kings from Rajendra I had their coronations at Gangaikonda Cholapuram. Archaeological excavations have revealed fort walls and palace remains a few kilometres from this temple.

Rajendra also built a royal palace of burnt brick. The ceilings were covered with small, flat tiles laid in several courses in a fine lime mortar. The pillars were probably made of polished wood and were supported on granite bases; a few pillar bases have survived. Iron nails and clamps have been recovered from this palace site. A tunnel links the palace and the temple's inner first prakaara to the north.

Rajendra also developed Koneswaram temple in Trincomalee. The temple to Bhadrakali, which is located further along the complex inland along Konesar Road, benefitted from Rajendra. The Kali temple is mentioned in the book Birds of Prey (1997) by Wilbur Smith, which is set in the 1660s. The Thirukonasala Mahatyam, describing the origins of the world, Lanka and Koneswaram based on puranic legends, is lost. The historical literature Mattakallappu Manmiyam (Batticaloa Manmiyam) chronicles the Tamil settlement in Batticaloa; it follows the Dakshina Kailasa Puranam and Dakshina Kailasa Manmiam in its description of Koneswaram as one of the nine most-important and sacred sites in the world for Hindus.

Rajendra also expanded the Pathirakali Amman Temple in Trincomalee. It attracted many pilgrims during his reign.

Rajendra developed an efficient water management system from the village level upwards. The increase in royal patronage, and the number of devadana and bramadeya lands increased the role of the temples and village assemblies. Committees like (tank committee) and totta-variam (garden committees) were active, and the temples had vast resources in land, men and money.

Rajendra built a large tank named Cholagangam in his capital city Gangaikonda Cholapuram, and it was described as the liquid pillar of victory.

Ottakoothar's Vikrama Cholan Ula mentions Rajendra's conquests:

The king Rajendra Chola, generous as Karpaga tree that gives whatever one wants, went with his army, conquered and ruled and protected the land, where Ganges flows and Kadaram. He belongs to the lineage of Vikrama

— Ottakoothar, Vikrama Cholan Ula, verse 18

The Malay-language Hikayat Iskandar Zulkarnain was written about Alexander the Great as Dhul-Qarnayn, and from it, the ancestry of several South-East Asian royal families is traced to Iskandar Zulkarnain (Alexander the Great). through Rajendra (Raja Chulan, Raja Cholan) in the Malay Annals such as the Sumatran Minangkabau royalty.

=== Inscriptions ===
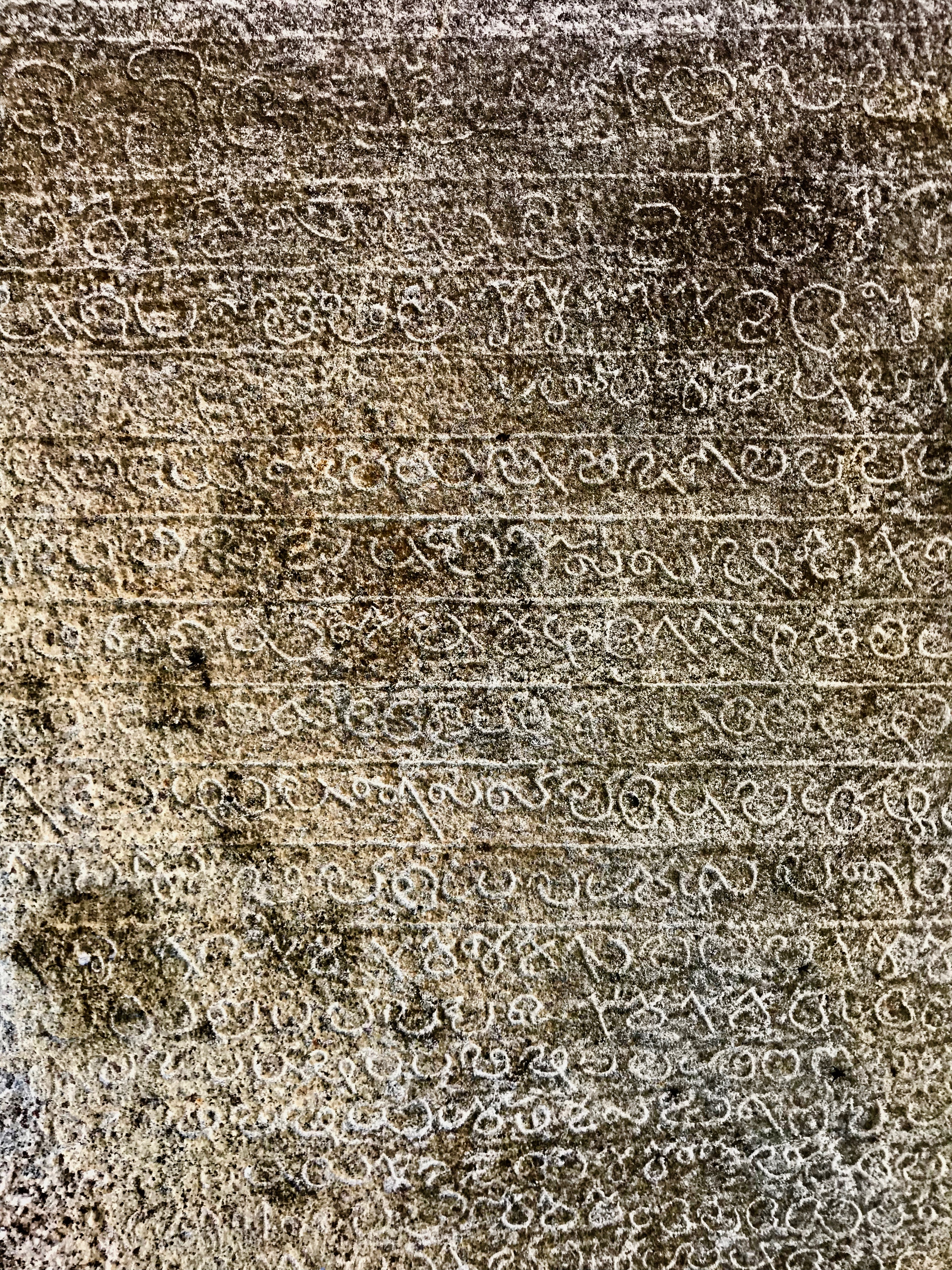
Inscriptions dating to Rajendra's 18th regional year (c.1032 CE). Kanyakumari, Tamil Nadu, India

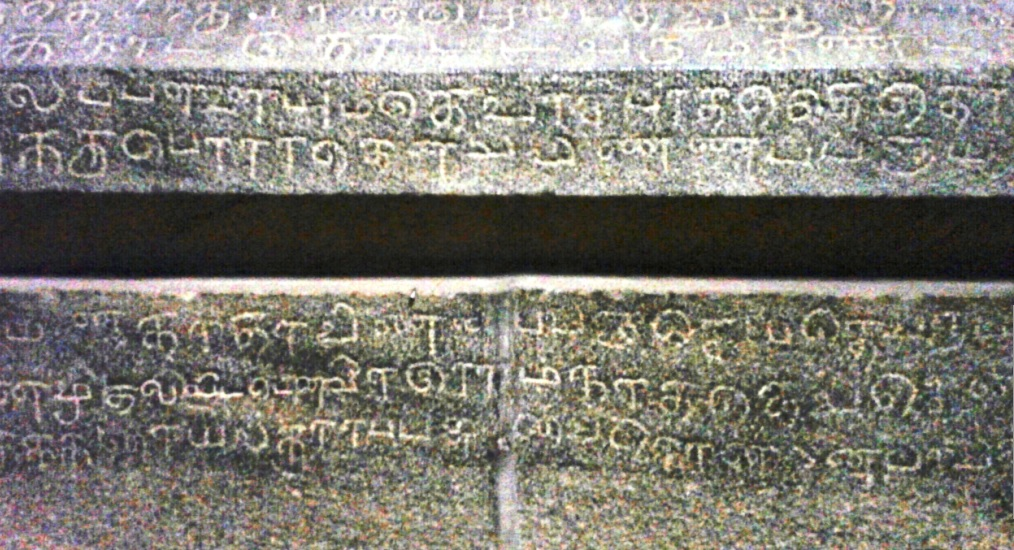
Tamil Inscription at Chokkanathaswamy temple Bangalore, Karnataka, India

Several inscriptions of Rajendra commemorating his reign and conquests have been found. An inscription at Adhipuriswara temple in Chengalpattu district gives his natal star as Tiruvadarai. Donations were made to the temple to celebrate the king's birthday in Maargali. An inscription at Umamahesvara temple in Konerirajapuram, Thanjavur district, refers to donations by Alvar Parantakan Kundavai-Pirattiyar during the third year of Rajendra's reign.

The walls of Rajarajeswaramudaiya Mahadevar Temple, built by his father and later developed by Rajendra, include inscriptions describing many donations to the temple made by Rajendra.

=== Officials ===
Rajendra appointed his son Rajadhiraja as heir apparent to the Chola throne in 1018. Large military expeditions, like the Pandya and Chalukya wars, were carried out by Rajadhiraja. The prominent officials of the time were:

- Vallavaraiyar Vandyadevar
- Yadava Bhima "Uttama Chola" Miladudaiyar
- Gangaikonda Chola Miladudaiyar
- Dandanayakan Narakkan Krishnan Raman
- Marayan Arumoli "Uttama Chola" Brahmamarayan
- Talaigrama Indaladeva

== Popular culture ==
- He is portrayed by Sivakumar in the Tamil-language film Rajaraja Cholan (1973).
- India's merchant navy training ship TS Rajendra was named in his honour.
- The state government of Maharashtra proposed to dedicate Rajendra's portrait to Mazgaon Docks.
- The video game Age of Empires II: Definitive Edition: Dynasties of India contains a five-chapter campaign titled Rajendra.

=== Literature ===
- Vengayin Maindhan by Akilan covers the life and achievements of Rajendra
- Gangapuri Kavalan by Vembu Vikiraman in which Rajendra's the protagonist
- Mannan Magal by Sandilyan set in the period of Rajendra
- Gangai Konda Cholan by Balakumaran
- Ulagam Vendra Cholan by Bharathika which covers the war history and lifetime achievements

== Gallery ==
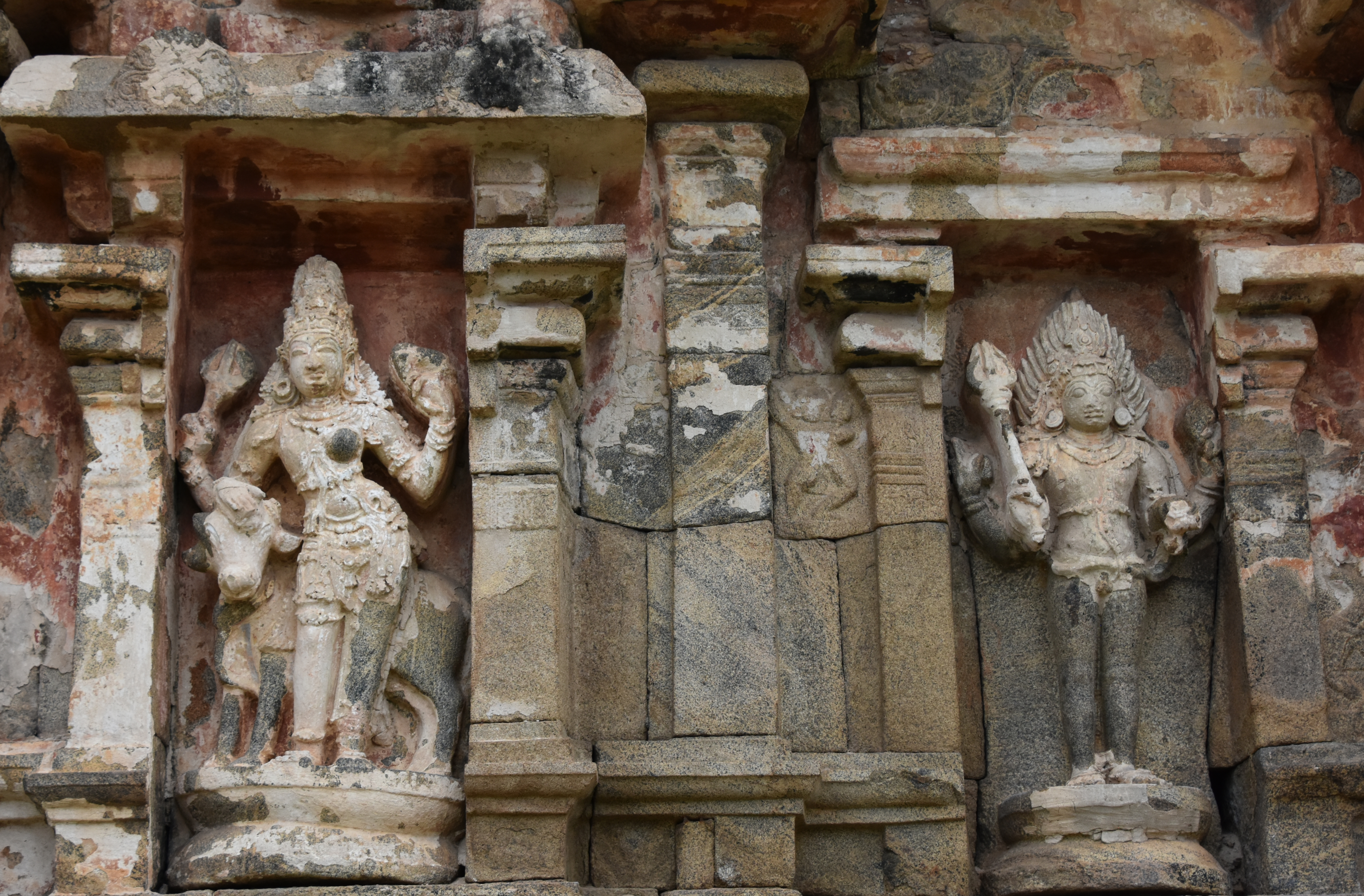
Sculptures of Shiva and Parvati at Gangaikonda Cholapuram

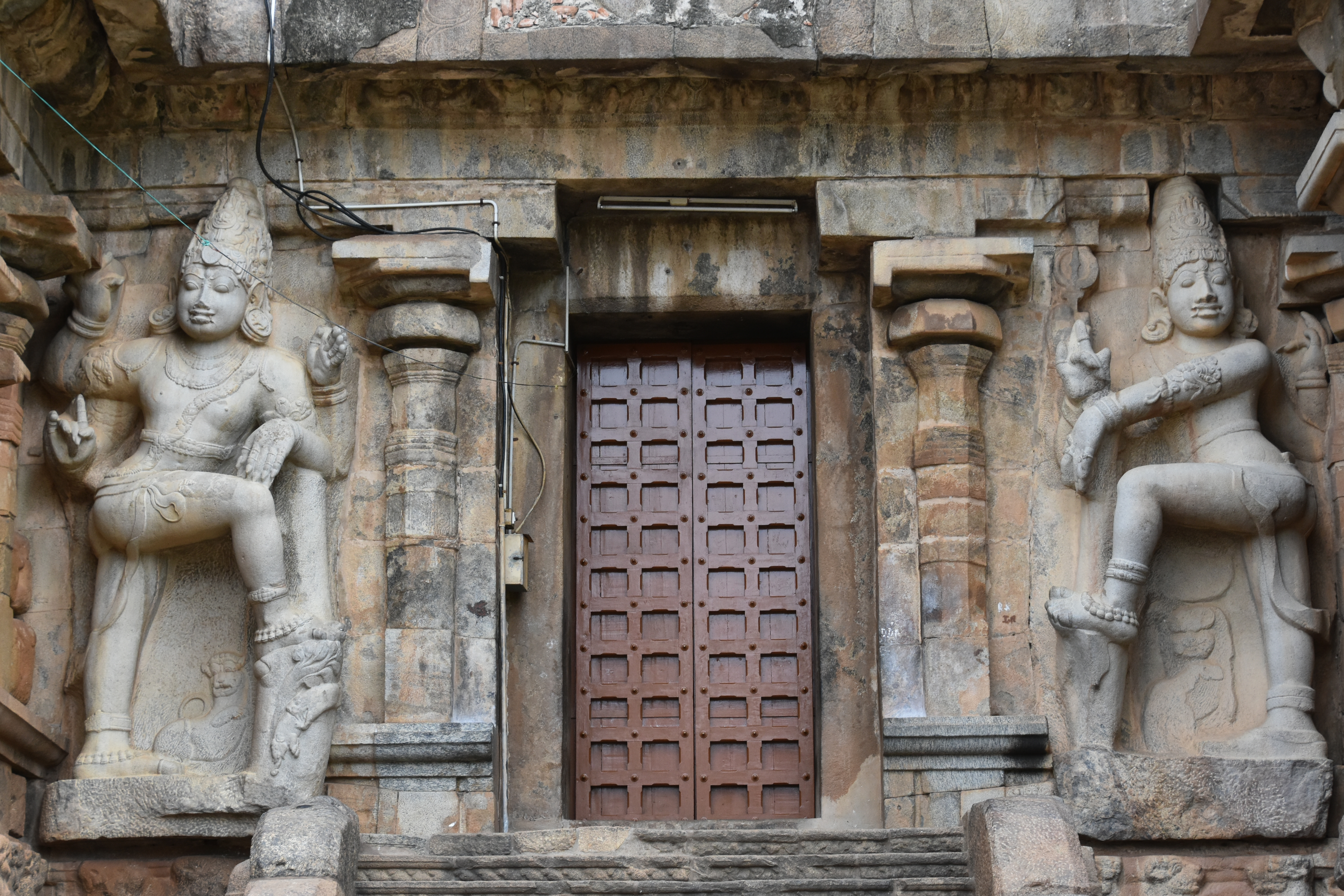
Entrance of Gangaikonda Cholapuram Temple

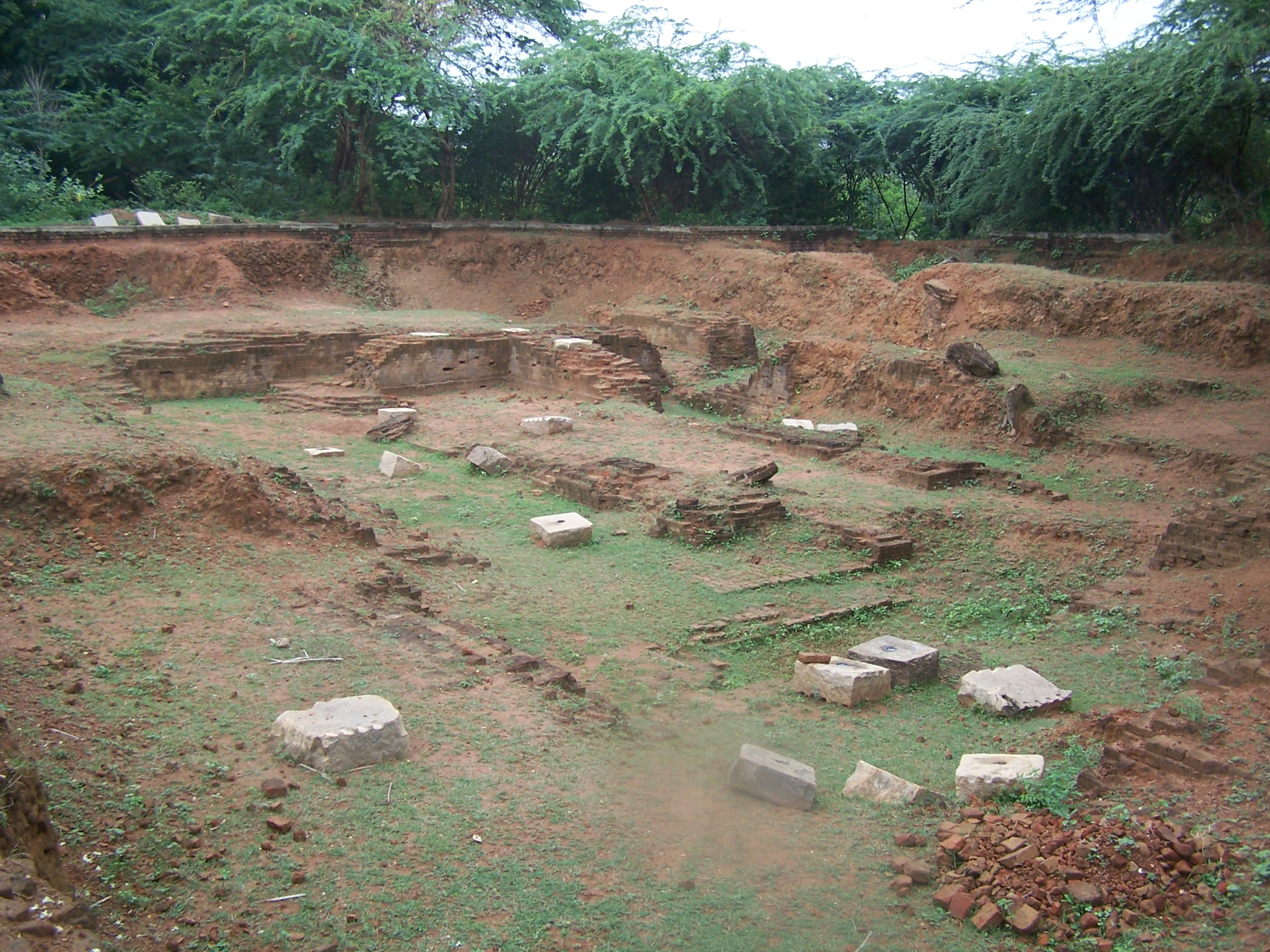
Ruins of Rajendra's Palace

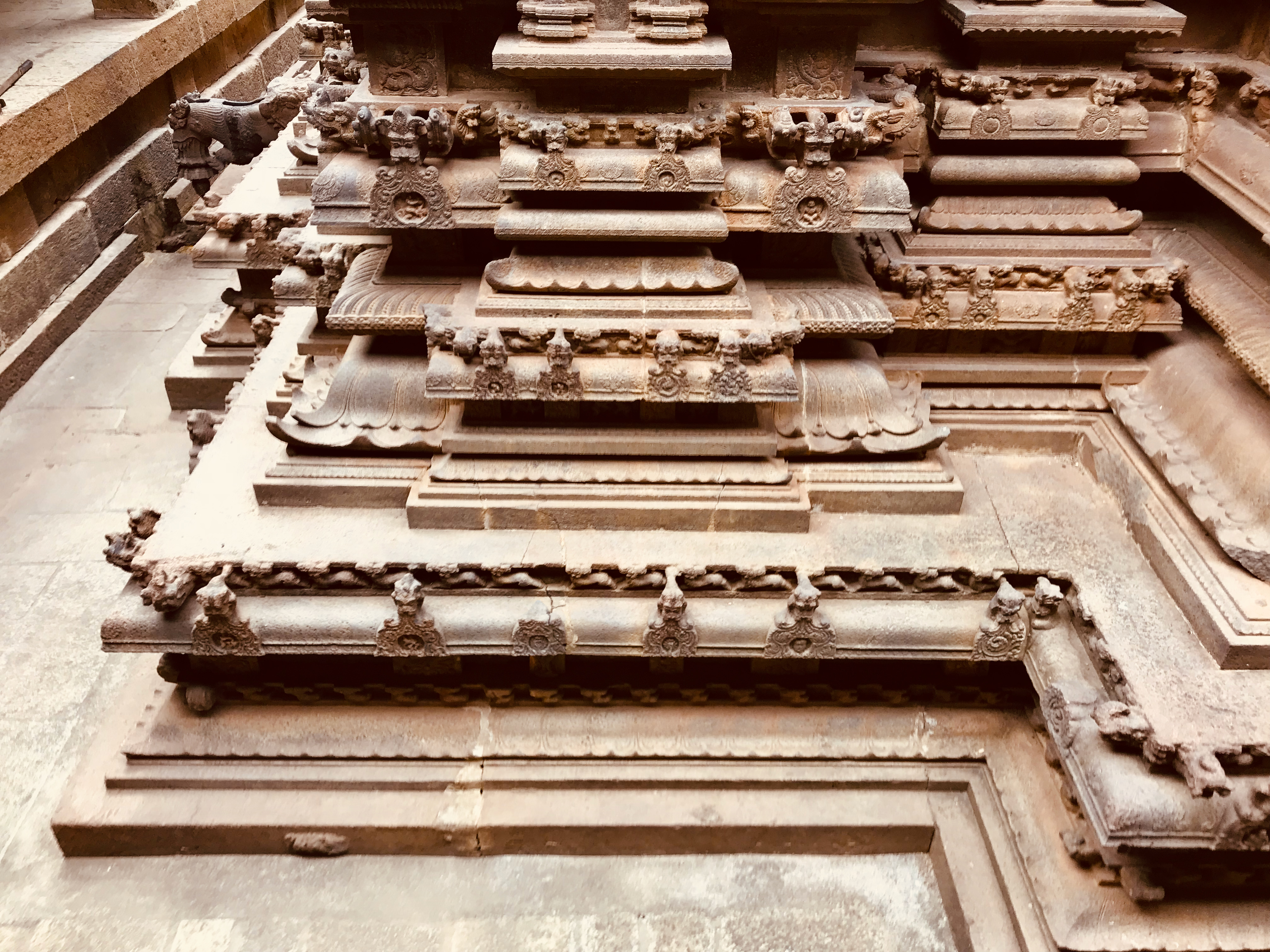
Bhaktavatsala Temple

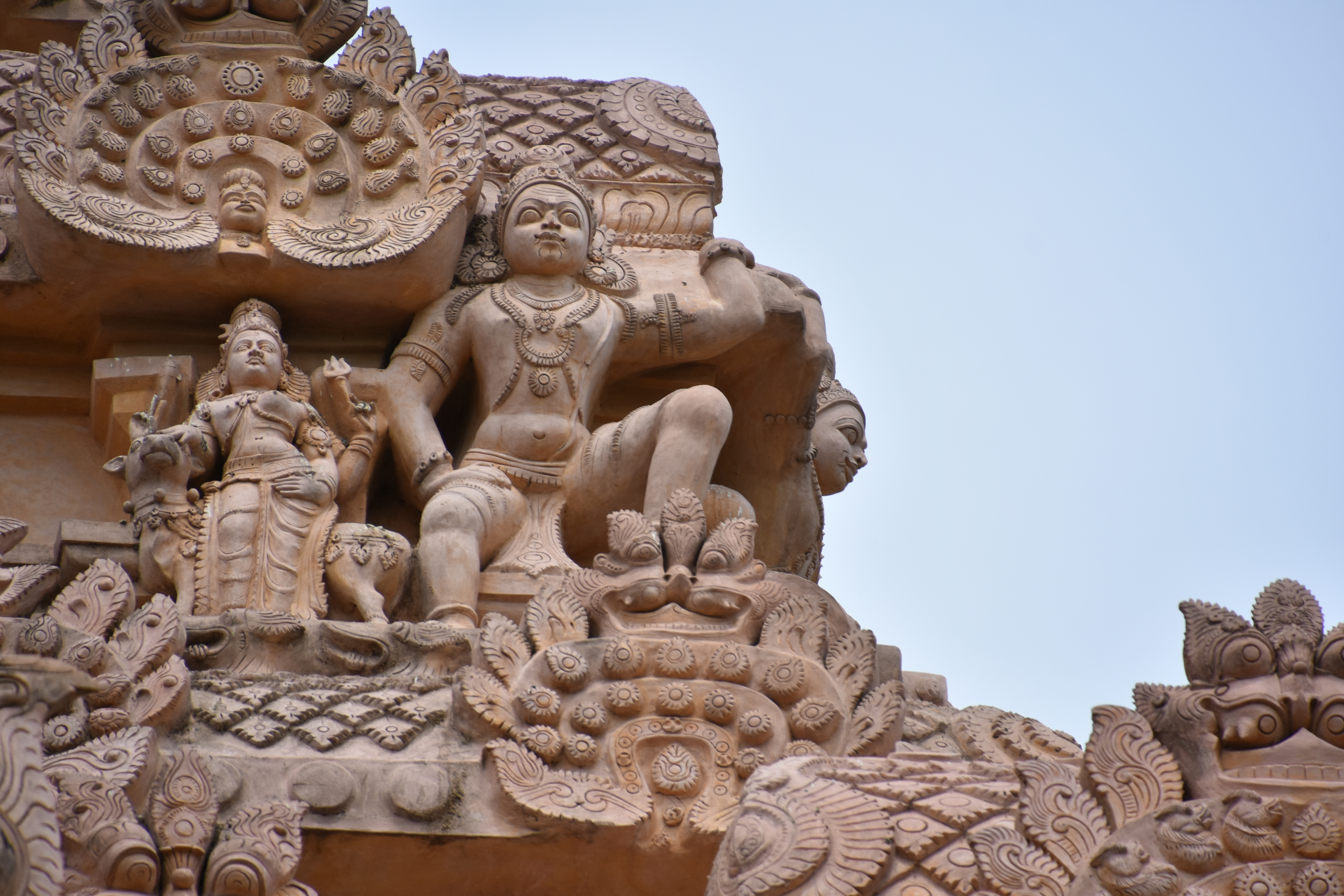
Sculptures at Gangaikonda Cholapuram

== See also ==
- Chola Empire
- Chola Military
- Chola Navy
- List of Indian monarchs
- History of south India
- List of Tamil monarchs

== Bibliography ==
- Karashima, Noboru (2014). A Concise History of South India: Issues and Interpretations. New Delhi: Oxford University Press. ISBN 978-0-19-809977-2.
- K. A. Nilakanta Sastri (1955) [1935]. The Colas (2nd revised ed.). University of Madras.
- K. A. N. Sastri (1992). "The Cōḷas". In R. S. Sharma; K. M. Shrimali (eds.). A Comprehensive history of India: A.D. 985-1206. People's Publishing House. ISBN 978-81-7007-121-1.
- S.R. Balasubrahmanyam (1975). Middle Chola Temples. Thomson Press. ISBN 978-9060236079.
- M. G. S. Narayanan (2013) [1972]. Perumals of Kerala: Brahmin Oligarchy and Ritual Monarchy. Kerala: CosmoBooks. ISBN 978-81-88765-07-2.
- Vasudevan, Geeta (2003). Royal Temple of Rajaraja: An Instrument of Imperial Chola Power. Abhinav Publications. ISBN 0-00-638784-5.
- T. S, Sridhar (2011). Thiruvindalur Copper Plate [திருவிந்தளூர்ச்‌ செப்பேடு] (in English and Tamil) (First ed.). Chennai: Tamil Nadu State Department of Archaeology. pp. 20, 21.

Preceded by Rajaraja Chola I	Chola dynasty 1012–1044 CE	Succeeded by Rajadhiraja Chola
