= Battle of Donur =

Battle in India in 1007

- Part of Chalukya-Chola Wars
Date	1007 CE
Location	Donur
Result	Chola victory

Belligerents
Western Chalukyas	Chola Empire

Commanders and leaders
Satyashraya	Raja Raja Chola I Rajendra Chola I

Strength
Unknown	900,000

Casualties and losses
Unknown	Unknown

Battle of Donur was fought between the Cholas, during the reign of Raja Raja Chola I, and the Western Chalukya king Satyashraya at the town of Donur in Bijapur district, Karnataka, in southern India, in 1007 CE. The Cholas were led by crown-prince Rajendra Chola I.

== Causes ==
The Cholas had defeated the Gangas, weakened by the independence war waged against them by the Western Chalukyas, and conquered Gangapadi and Nolambapadi (Southern Karnataka and Andhra Pradesh).

== Events ==
An inscription of the third year of Rajendra Chola states that, Rajendra defeated Satyashraya and successfully raided Banavasi, Donur (in the Bijapur region), unkal (near modern Hubli), Kudala sangama and parts of the Raichur Doab (called Iditurainadu) and secured Gangavadi and Nolambavadi. According to an inscription of Satyasraya from Dharwad, Rajaraja Nittavinoda Rajendra Vidyadhara, ornament of the Chola race, Nurmudi-Chola (one-hundred-crown Chola) invaded the Western Chalukya Empire in 1007 AD with an army of 900,000 soldiers, carrying fire and sword throughout the region. The invading troops advanced as far as Donur in Bijapur district on their way to the Chalukya capital Manyakheta, where they were met by the Chalukya army under Satyashraya. The Tanjore big temple inscriptions state that Rajendra Chola I destroyed the Western Chalukya capital.

== Bibliography ==
- Sastri, K. A. Nilakanta (2000) [1935]. The Cōlas. Madras: University of Madras. pp. 176–177.
