= Chola invasion of Kedah =

Invasion in 1068

- Part of Southeast Asian campaign of Rajendra I
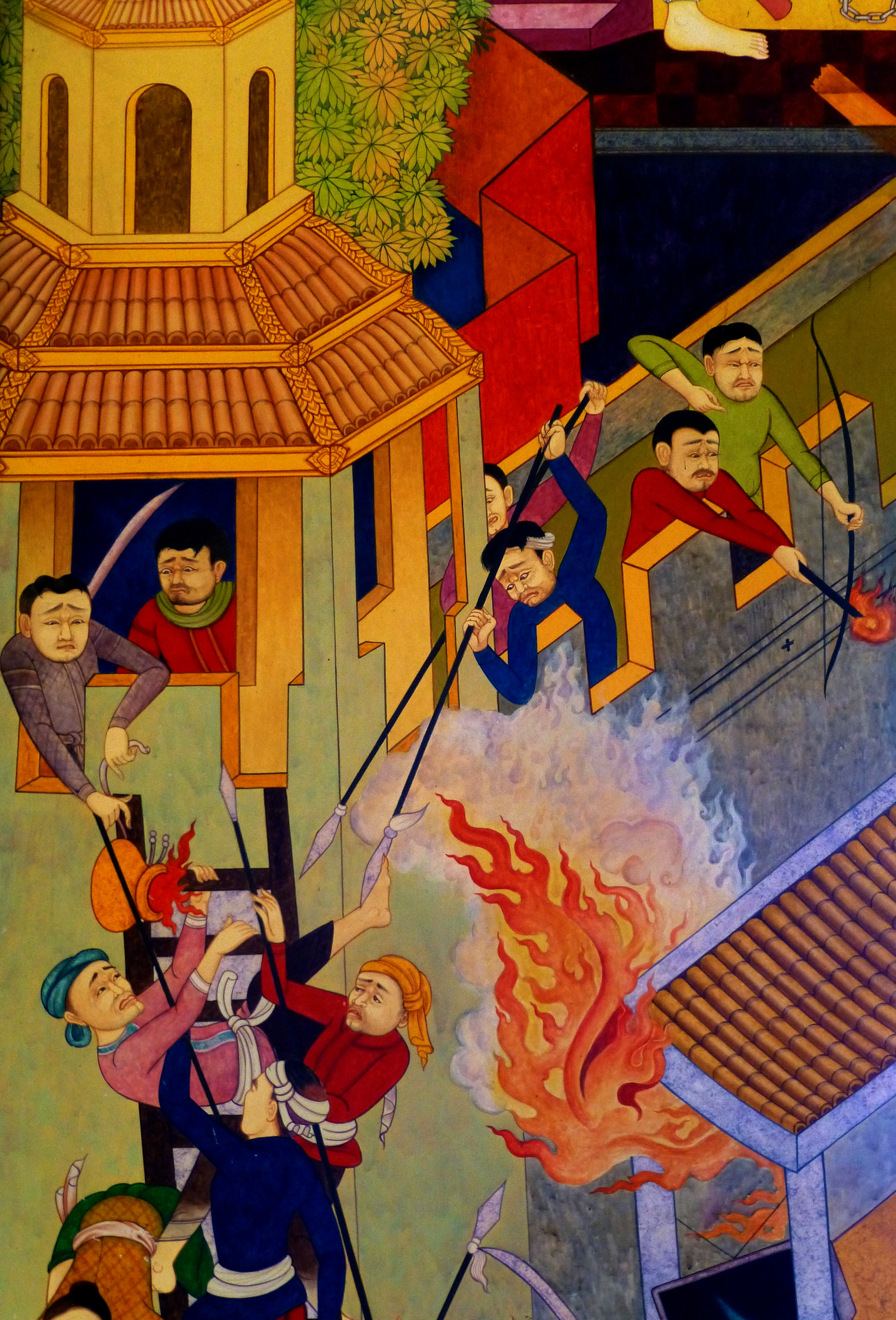
- Painting from Wat Thai, Penang, Malaysia, depicting of the Chola raid in Kedah
| Date | 1025–1068 CE |
| Location | Known as Kadaram by Chola (now modern-day Kedah) |
| Result | Chola victory |

The Tamil prasaśti of Virarajendra Chola records about a naval invasion of the early Ancient Kedah called "Kadaram" (now modern-day Kedah in Malaysia) named by the medievals and ancient Tamils, and also the Cholas in 1068. Sources assert that the expedition was undertaken to help a Kadaram prince who had approached Virarajendra Chola for assistance in procuring the throne. The kingdom of Kadaram is believed to be the same as the Srivijaya empire although some scholars disagree.

== Sources ==
The most detailed source of information on the campaign is the Tamil stele of Rajendra Chola I. The stele states:

(Who) having despatched many ships in the midst of the rolling sea and having caught Sangrāma-vijayōttunga-varman, the king of Kadāram, together with the elephants in his glorious army, (took) the large heap of treasures, which (that king) had rightfully accumulated; (captured) with noise the (arch called) Vidhyādharatorana at the "war gate" of his extensive city, Śrī Vijaya with the "jewelled wicket-gate" adorned with great splendour and the "gate of large jewels"; Paṇṇai with water in its bathing ghats; the ancient Malaiyūr with the strong mountain for its rampart; Māyuriḍingam, surrounded by the deep sea (as) by a moat; Ilangāśōka (i.e. Lankāśōka) undaunted in fierce battles; Māpappālam having abundant (deep) water as defence; Mēviḷimbangam having fine walls as defence; Vaḷaippandūru having Viḷappandūru (?); Talaittakkōlam praised by great men (versed in) the sciences; Mādamālingam, firm in great and fierce battles; Ilāmuridēśam, whose fierce strength rose in war; Mānakkavāram, in whose extensive flower gardens honey was collecting; and Kadāram, of fierce strength, which was protected by the deep sea

The Thiruvalangadu plates, from the fourteenth year of Rajendra Chola I, mentions his conquest of Kadaram but does not go into the details. The first attempt by someone from outside India to identify the places associated with the campaign was made by epigraphist E. Hultzsch, who had published the stele in 1891. Hultzsch identified the principalities mentioned in the inscription with places ruled by the Pandyan Dynasty. In 1903, he rescinded his theory and stated that the stele described Rajendra Chola I's conquest of Bago in Burma. George Coedès' Le Royaume de Sri Vijaya published in 1918 after several years of research, rejected both the theories and provided the first convincing description of Rajendra Chola I's conquest of Southeast Asia.

== Background ==
The reasons of this naval expedition are unclear, the historian Nilakanta Sastri suggested that the attack was probably caused by Srivijayan attempts to throw obstacles in the way of the Chola trade with the East (especially China), or more probably, a simple desire on the part of Rajendra to extend his digvijaya to the countries across the sea so well known to his subject at home, and therefore add luster to his crown. Another theory suggests that the reasons for the invasion was probably motivated by geopolitics and diplomatic relations. King Suryavarman I of the Khmer Empire requested aid from Rajendra Chola I of the Chola dynasty against Tambralinga kingdom. After learning of Suryavarman's alliance with Rajendra Chola, the Tambralinga kingdom requested aid from the Srivijaya king Sangrama Vijayatunggavarman.

== Invasion ==
Malaiyur in Malaysia, with "its strong mountain", has been identified with Malayu in today Jambi province in Batanghari river valley, where a strong principality flourished at that time. Other suggestion is the southern part of the Malay Peninsula gets raided by the cholas. Mayirudingam is believed to be the same as Ji-lo-ting listed by the Chinese writer Chau Ju-Kua among the dependencies of Sri Vijaya and is identified with the city of Chaiya in the centre of the Malay Peninsula. The land of Ilangasoka (Langkasuka) mentioned in the inscriptions has been located on the east coast of the Malay Peninsula and is believed to be the same as the province of Ling-ya-sseu-kia mentioned in Chau Ju-Kua's list.Talaittakkolam is believed to be the same as Takkola mentioned by Ptolemy as a trading emporion on the Golden Chersonese, and identified with Trang or the modern-day city of Takuapa in the Isthmus of Kra. and at last Kadaram, All these cities were raided and sacked by the Chola Empire.

The Thiruvilandur Copper Plate records,

By massacring mercilessly the fourfold army of Kataha and overpowering the powerful master of that place, Rajéndra forcibly took possession of the enormous gold that had been amassed there (v. 37).

— Thiruvilandur Copper Plate

Aftermath

This dominance started to decline when Srivijaya were invaded by Chola Empire, a dominant maritime power of Indian subcontinent, in 1025. The invasion reshaped power and trade in the region, resulted in the rise of new regional powers such as the Khmer Empire and Kahuripan. Continued commercial contacts with the Chinese Empire enabled the Cholas to influence the local cultures. As Srivijaya influence in the region declined, The Khmer Empire experienced a golden age during the 11th to 13th century CE. The empire's capital Angkor hosts majestic monuments—such as Angkor Wat and Bayon. However, the Chola raids on ports within the Srivijaya network around 1025 CE were short-term naval expeditions primarily aimed at capturing tribute and asserting Chola naval power. In Kedah, which was ruled by the local House of Merong, and in the Srivijaya Empire, whose rulers were considered god-kings, the raids caused temporary disruption but did not result in permanent Chola control. Following the decline of Chola influence in the 12th century due to internal conflicts and the resurgence of the Pandya dynasty, these regions gradually regained autonomy and continued under their respective local dynasties

== Bibliography ==
- Sastri, K. A. Nilakanta (2000) [1935]. The Cōlas. Madras: University of Madras.
