= Vikramaditya V =

Western Chalukya Emperor from 1008 to 1015

Western Chalukya King
- Reign: 1008–1015
- Predecessor: Satyashraya
- Successor: Jayasimha II
- House: Chalukya dynasty
- Father: Dashavarman

Vikaramaditya V (r. 1008–1015) succeeded Satyashraya on the Western Chalukya throne. Vikramaditya was born to Dashavarman (alias Yashovarman), the younger son of the dynasty's founder Tailapa II, and his wife Bhagyavati. He was Satyashraya's nephew and had a very uneventful short reign.

Vikramaditya V was followed on the throne by his brother Jayasimha II in 1015.
