= Battle of Maski =

Chola–Chalukya wars

- Part of Chalukya-Chola Wars
Date	1019 - 1020 CE
Location	Maski, Karnataka, India
Result	Chola Victory

Belligerents
Chola dynasty	Western Chalukyas

Commanders and leaders
Rajendra Chola	Jayasimha II

Units involved
9,00,000	

Strength
unknown	unknown

The Battle of Maski was a historical conflict fought at Maski (in present-day Karnataka, India). The battle is mentioned in inscriptional and literary sources relating to the Chola–Western Chalukya wars of the early 11th century. It involved the forces of the Chola Empire under Rajendra Chola I and the Western Chalukyas under Jayasimha II.

== Source ==
Rajendra's war against Jayasimha is described in his Tamil prasasti in the following terms:

"He captured the seven and a half lakhs of Raṭṭapāḍi, which was strong by nature, and vast quantities of treasure, together with the inestimable reputation of Jayasimha, who, out of fear and to his great disrepute, turned his back at Muśangi and hid himself."

== Background ==
The conflict at Maski (identified with Musangi in inscriptions) formed part of the wider struggle between the Chola Empire under Rajendra Chola I and the Western Chalukyas under Jayasimha II in the early 11th century. The campaign is associated with Chola expansion into the Deccan, particularly the Raichur Doab and Gangavadi regions. According to inscriptional and literary sources, Rajendra Chola I advanced from Kanchipuram on a northern campaign against the Western Chalukyas, following earlier Chola involvement in the affairs of Vengi and southern India.

== Battle ==
The inscriptions describe a pitched battle at Musangi (identified with Maski) around c. 1020–1021 CE. Chola records, including the Tiruvalangadu copper plates, state that Rajendra Chola I marched through Gangavadi and engaged the forces of Jayasimha II. These records portray the Chola army as victorious, claiming that Jayasimha II retreated from the battlefield and that the Cholas captured territories such as Rattapadi, along with considerable wealth.

The Chola success is further reflected in inscriptions attributed to their campaign, which commemorate their achievements in the region. Jayasimha II, however, appears to have recovered the lost territories after the battle, and by c. 1024 CE he retained control up to the Tungabhadra River. The Tungabhadra subsequently emerged as a stable boundary between the Chola and Western Chalukya spheres of influence.

== Aftermath ==
Following the battle, the Cholas appear to have temporarily annexed parts of the Raichur Doab and surrounding areas, as suggested by their inscriptions. Nevertheless, evidence from later records indicates that Jayasimha II retained authority up to the Tungabhadra region and subsequently reasserted control over contested territories. The conflict at Maski thus formed part of the prolonged and fluctuating Chola–Chalukya wars, without leading to a permanent settlement in the region.
