= Chola–Chalukya Wars =

Hundred Year War between the Chalukya and Chola Empires

The Chola-chalukya Wars were a series of battles that were fought from 992 CE to 1120 CE between the Chola Empire and the Western Chalukya Empire in what is now South India. Conflicts eventually exhausted as both empires, straining their manpower and material, were left vulnerable to other enemies. More than 1,000,000 people were killed due to direct or indirect consequences of the war.

== Campaigns ==
The battles were fought on two fronts: the Western Front in which the capture of Manyakheta and Kalyani were the objectives of the Cholas, and the Eastern Front which centered around Vengi which was strategic for both sides. The west saw the heaviest fighting with Rajendra Chola I leading an army of 900,000 and defeating Jayasimha II at the Battle of Maski (1019 CE – 1020 CE). On the Eastern Front, Rajendra Chola led Rajaraja Chola I's army in Vengi and expelled the rulers in battle. Vengi was later the site of the coronation of Rajendra Chola's nephew following his victories in the Chola expedition to North India. Rajendra II was killed in the battle at the city of Kakkargond on the banks of Thungabhadra by Someshvara I. Ahavamalla Someshwara I suffered defeats many a time at the hands of Rajadhiraja Chola, and lost his brother Jayasimha III in battle with Rajendra Chola II.

After Rajadhiraja Chola I and Rajendra Chola II, their brother Virarajendra Chola defeated Ahavamalla Someshwara I on not less than five occasions. Virarajendra Chola also put to flight the latter's two sons, Vikramaditya VI and Jayasimha, multiple times in the battles of Kudala sangama. Virarajendra Chola also defeated the eldest son of Ahavamalla Someshwara I, and crown-prince Someshwara II in the Battle of Kampili, and spoiled his coronation ceremony.

The Western Chalukyas mounted several unsuccessful attempts to engage the Chola emperors in war, and except for a brief occupation of the Vengi territories between 1118 and 1126, allied with Prince Vikramaditya VI. After Vikramaditya's death in 1126, the Cholas began a slow process of encroachment over Vengi. By 1133 Vikrama Chola defeated Someshvara III in the Battle of Godavari with the help of Gonga II. Then Vikrama Chola Able to capture Vengi and recover Kolar and some other parts of Gangavadi from Someshvara III.

== List of decisive battles in the Chalukya–Chola Wars ==
- Battle of Donur (1007 CE)
- Battle of Tavareyaghatta (1007 CE)
- Battle of Chebrolu (1008 CE)
- Battle of Maski (1019 – 1020 CE)
- Battle of the Godavari 1028 AD
- Battle of Dannada (1042 - 1044 CE)
- Battle of Pundur (1046 CE)
- Battle of Kampili (1044 - 1046 CE)
- Battle of Koppam (1054 CE)
- Battle of Mudakkaru (1060 CE)
- First Battle of Kudal-Sangamam (1062 CE)
- Second Battle of Kudal-Sangamam (1067 CE)
- Battle of Vijayawada (1068 CE)
- Battle of Kampili (1068 CE)
- Battle of Nangili (1076 CE)
- Battle of Godavari (1133 CE)
