= Battle of Vijayawada =

Battle in India in 1068

- Part of Chalukya–Chola wars
Date	1068
Location	Vijayawada
Result	Chola victory; Coronation of Vijayaditya VII as Eastern Chalukya ruler

Belligerents
Western Chalukyas	Chola Empire

Commanders and leaders
Vikramaditya VI, Jananatha, Rajamayan	Virarajendra Chola

Strength
Unknown	Unknown

The Battle of Vijayawada was fought in 1068 between the Chola army under Virarajendra Chola and the Western Chalukya army commanded by Vikramaditya VI near the present-day city of Vijayawada in Andhra Pradesh, India. The war resulted in the recovery of Vengi Andhra by the Cholas and coronation of Vijayaditya VII as Eastern Chalukya ruler by Virarajendra Chola.

== Causes ==
In 1066, during the reign of the Western Chalukya king Someshvara I, Vikramaditya VI had invaded the Chola Empire penetrating as far as the capital Gangaikonda Cholapuram and threatening the city before being repulsed. The Chola Emperor Virarajendra Chola reacted by leading a huge force into the Western Chalukya kingdom. Virarajendra proposed a showdown at Kudal-Sangamam at the junction of the Krishna and the Tungabhadra, but when Someshvara I failed to turn up, Virarajendra ravaged the country and defeated the Nolamba, Kadava and Vaidumba feudatories of Someshvara I and besieged the city of Vengi which the Cholas had earlier lost to the Western Chalukyas.

== Events ==
The Western Chalukya garrison led by Jananatha and Rajamayan fought a decisive battle with the Cholas but facing the prospect of imminent defeat, fled into the jungles of the north with the Chola army in hot pursuit. Virarajendra pursued the fleeing Western Chalukya forces beyond the Godavari River. After conquering Kalinga and Sakkarakkottam, Virarajendra crowned Vijayaditya VII as the king of Vengi and returned home.

== Bibliography ==
- Sastri, K. A. Nilakanta (2000) [1935]. The Cōlas. Madras: University of Madras.
