= Rajarajeswaramudaiya Mahadevar Temple =

Shiva temple in Tamil Nadu, India

- இராஜராஜேஸ்வரமுடைய மகாதேவர் கோவில்
- Location in Tamil Nadu

Religion
- Affiliation: Hinduism
- District: Kanchipuram
- Deity: Rajarajeswaramudaiya Mahadevar (Shiva), Theerthapaleeswarar
- Governing body: Tamil Nadu State Department of Archaeology

Location
- Location: Sivapuram
- State: Tamil Nadu
- Country: India
- Interactive map of Rajarajeswaramudaiya Mahadevar Temple
- Coordinates: 13.0215°N 79.7934°E

Architecture
- Founder: Rajaraja Cholan
- Established: 10th century
- Inscriptions: Tamil

Rajarajeswaramudaiya Mahadevar Temple (Tamil: இராஜராஜேஸ்வரமுடைய மகாதேவர் கோவில், Sivapuram Sivan Temple is a Shiva temple located in Sivapuram in Kanchipuram District of Tamil Nadu, India.

== History ==
This temple was initially built by Rajaraja Cholan during the 10th century C.E. and later developed by his son Rajendra Chola I.

== Deities ==
The main deity in the temple is called "Rajarajeswaramudaiya Mahadevar" and also as Theerthapaleeswarar. His consort is Kamakshi Amman.

== Rock inscriptions ==
The temple walls are full of inscriptions from top to bottom. These inscriptions are of both Rajaraja Chola I and Rajendra Chola I period.

One of the inscriptions gives the various titles of Rajendra Chola I. It also gives the information that he donated 180 goats to the temple for the upkeep of two Nanda lights (lanterns)

This temple is a treasure house for students who wish to research on Tamil inscriptions of the 10th and 11th centuries.

== Management ==
The temple is managed by the Tamil Nadu State Department of Archaeology. The temple is maintained in good condition and further development works are being carried out.

== Location ==
Rajarajeswaramudaiya Mahadevar Temple is located 100 meters from the Sivapuram Bus-Halt on the highway connecting Thiruvallur and Thakkolam.

== Bibliography ==
- Rajarajeswaramudaiya Mahadevar Temple

== Additional information ==
- Sivapuram Rajarajeswaram (in Tamil-language)
- Sivapuram Sivan Kovil (in Tamil-language)
