= Satyashraya =

Western Chalukya Emperor from 997 to 1008

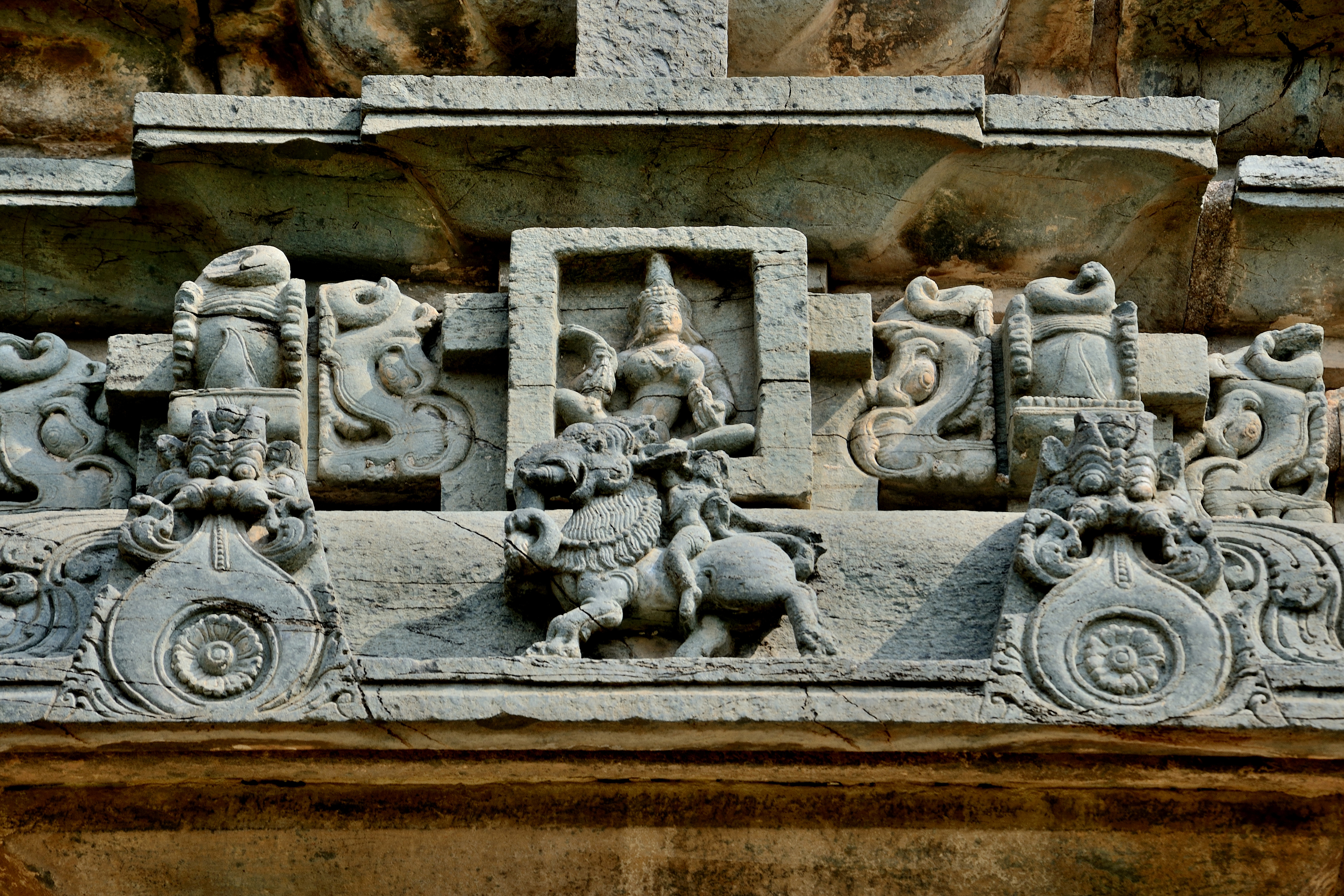
- Carving details of the outer wall of the Brahma Jinalaya (Jain Basadi), commissioned by Satyashraya and his general Nagadeva.

Western Chalukya King
- Reign: 997–1008
- Predecessor: Tailapa II
- Successor: Vikramaditya V
- Died: 1008
- House: Chalukya dynasty
- Father: Tailapa II
- Religion: Jainism

Satyashraya (IAST: Satyāśraya; died 1008), also known as Sattiga or Irivabedanga, was a king of the Western Chalukya Empire. During a time of consolidation of the empire in the early 11th century, Satyashraya was involved in several battles with the Chola dynasty of Thanjavur, the Paramara dynasty and Chedi Kingdom of central India, and the Chaulukyas of Gujarat. The results of these wars were mixed, with victories and defeats. Even as a prince, during the rule of his father Tailapa II, Satyashraya had established himself as an ambitious warrior. Satyashraya patronised the great Kannada poet Ranna (one among the "three gems" or ratnatraya of classical Kannada literature) who compared his patron favourably to the Pandava prince Bhima (of the epic Mahabharatha) for his strength and valor in his epic poem Sahasabhimavijaya (lit, "Daring Bhima", the epic also known as Gadayuddha). Satyashraya held such titles as Akalavarsha, Akalankacharita and Sahasabhima.

== Battles in the North ==
During the reign of Satyashraya, the Paramaras and Chedi rulers of central India (also known as the Kalachuris of Tripuri) appear to have regained control over territories they had lost to the Satyashraya's father Tailapa II (on account of his victories over Munja in c. 996). Satyashraya however subdued the Shilahara King Aparajita of the northern Konkan and made him a vassal. There was rebellion against the Lata Chalukya chief Barapa in the Gujarat province of the Western Chalukya empire. Barapa had been ousted by Mularaja from the Chaulukya family. Satyashraya led an expedition to Gujarat, defeated Mularaja and reinstated Goggiraja, son of Barapa. Thus, he consolidated his control over that region.

== Wars with the Cholas ==
During the early 11th century, the Chola dynasty of Thanjavur were on the ascendant. The Chola influence in the eastern Deccan ruled by the Chalukyas of Vengi (the Eastern Chalukyas) was on the rise. With the help of the Cholas, Saktivarman had defeated Jata-Choda Bhima and gained control of the Vengi kingdom. The rise of Chola influence in the east was unacceptable to the Western Chalukyas. Around c.1006 - 1007, a general of Satyashraya named Bayalnambi burnt the forts at Dhanyakataka (or Dharanikota) and Yanamandala. With these victories, Satyashraya was able to establish himself temporarily at Chebrolu in the modern Guntur district.

But these early victories were temporary. The Chola King Rajaraja I mounted a two pronged counter-attack. A large Chola army led by prince Rajendra Chola invaded and captured Donur in the Bijapur region, Banavasi, parts of the Raichur Doab (called Iditurainnadu), Unkal near modern Hubli, and Kudalasangama in modern Bagalkot district. However, Satyashraya at last reconquered these territories after defeating Rajendra Chola according to Hottur inscriptions which have also been noted by historians Suryanath Kamath and R.C. Mujamdar. Emperor Satyashraya defeated Rajendra Chola in Chebrolu and captured it.

An inscription dated 1005 AD found at Yelesirur (Dharwad district) says that Satyashraya was in Shriparvata (Srisailam in Kurnool) in connection with the campaign against the Cholas and had enlisted the help of Eastern Chalukyas of Vengi in his wars against the Cholas. Satyashraya fought against Raja Raja Chola in the latter's third campaign. Satyashraya retaliated by invading the Vengi country in 1006 AD and placed Saktivarman on the throne of Vengi. In 1007 AD, he defeated Rajendra Chola in the Battle of Tavareyaghatta. Satyashraya annexed Andhra province from Cholas after raids of Rajendra Chola into the Chalukya territories and Satyashraya repulsed Rajendra Chola and reconquered Andhra Province.

Meanwhile, the Vengi kingdom was under the rule of Jata Choda Bhima, a member of the Telugu Cholas branch. However, Rajaraja emerged victorious in battle against Bhima, and Saktivarman, an Eastern Chalukya prince, was appointed as a viceroy under the Chola Dynasty. Despite a brief period of Bhima's recapture of Kanchi in 1001, Rajaraja swiftly restored Saktivarman to power. Notably, Rajaraja cemented an alliance between the Chola Dynasty and the Eastern Chalukya kingdom by arranging the marriage of his daughter, Kundavai, to the next viceroy of Vengi, Vimaladitya. This strategic union ensured the future succession of Rajaraja's descendants to the throne of the eastern Chalukya kingdom.Satyashraya retaliated by invading the Vengi country in 1006 A.D. and placed Saktivaiman on the Vengi Throne. Raja Raja Chola diverted the Chalukyas to send a big army under Prince Rajendra Chola in Chalukya country. So Satyashraya, without having reinforcement to deal with the Chola army, called back his general Bayal Nambi, who advanced up to Chebrollu. Satyastraya did not permanently recapture Vengi. He made attempts, but the Cholas successfully defended their vengi territory.

According to the historians Sastri and Sen, Satyashraya thereafter invested a great deal of effort in successfully freeing his kingdom from the Chola hold. According to historian Kamath, that Satyashraya was able to free his kingdom from the Cholas entirely, though at the cost of the life of his brother prince Dasavarman, is testified to by the Hottur inscription.

However, according to historian Balakrishnan Raja Gopal, the statement in the Chola records regarding their conquest of Rattapadi is an exaggeration. Further, the inscription of the Western Chalukyas in Guntur dated S. 928 (Paraabhava - V.R.ii. Guntur 84: 145 of 1897) sufficiently disposes off the Chola claim to having conquered the whole Rattapadi 7 1/2 lakh territory with Raja Raja Chola failing in his attempt in spite of a bold bid for conquest.

== Culture ==
Satyashraya continued the royal support of Jainism followed the precedent of his father, Tailapa II. During his reign, several Jain texts were composed, and Jain temples and basadis were constructed. He and his general, Nagadeva, commissioned numerous basadis, and Attimabbe also contributed significantly, commissioning many basadis. The "Brahma Jinalaya" was completed during his time. Inscriptions indicate that Attimabbe was responsible for building 1,501 Jain basadis in the region, and in recognition of her patronage, Satyashraya conferred upon her the title "Danachinatamani". He patronized Jain writers such as Ranna, who composed the "Ajitha Purana" and "Gadhayuddha". Historical evidence suggests that Jainism remained a prominent religion in the court, with Digambara Jainism holding significant influence. Many Jain monks flourished during this period, and the Mula Sangha, Darvila Sangha, and Yapaniya Sangha were active in the region. These sources suggest that the ruling dynasty were likely adherents of the Jain faith.

== See also ==
Chola–Chalukya Wars
