= Kogali =

Coordinates: 14°56′N 76°10′E

- village
- Interactive map of Kogali
- Country: India
- State: Karnataka
- District: Vijayanagara district

Government
  - Body: Gram panchayat

Languages
  - Official: Kannada
- Time zone: UTC+5:30 (IST)
- ISO 3166 code: IN-KA
- Nearest city: Hospet

Kogali is a village in the southern state of Karnataka, India. This village is located in Hagaribommanahalli Tehsil of Bellary district in Karnataka, India. It is situated 22 km away from sub-district headquarter Hagari bommanahalli and 122 km away from district headquarter Bellary.

== Historical background ==
In 944–945 C.E., Kogali was governed by a Chalukya feudatory of the Rashtrakuta of the King Krishna II, and in 956–957 C.E. by one of the chiefs of that dynasty.

Two stone inscriptions from this village demonstrates Jaina leanings of the Chalukya king Somesvara I.

== See also ==
- Bellary
- Districts of Karnataka
