= Imperial Chola Army =

Ancient and medieval Tamil armed forces

Chola military
- சோழர் படை
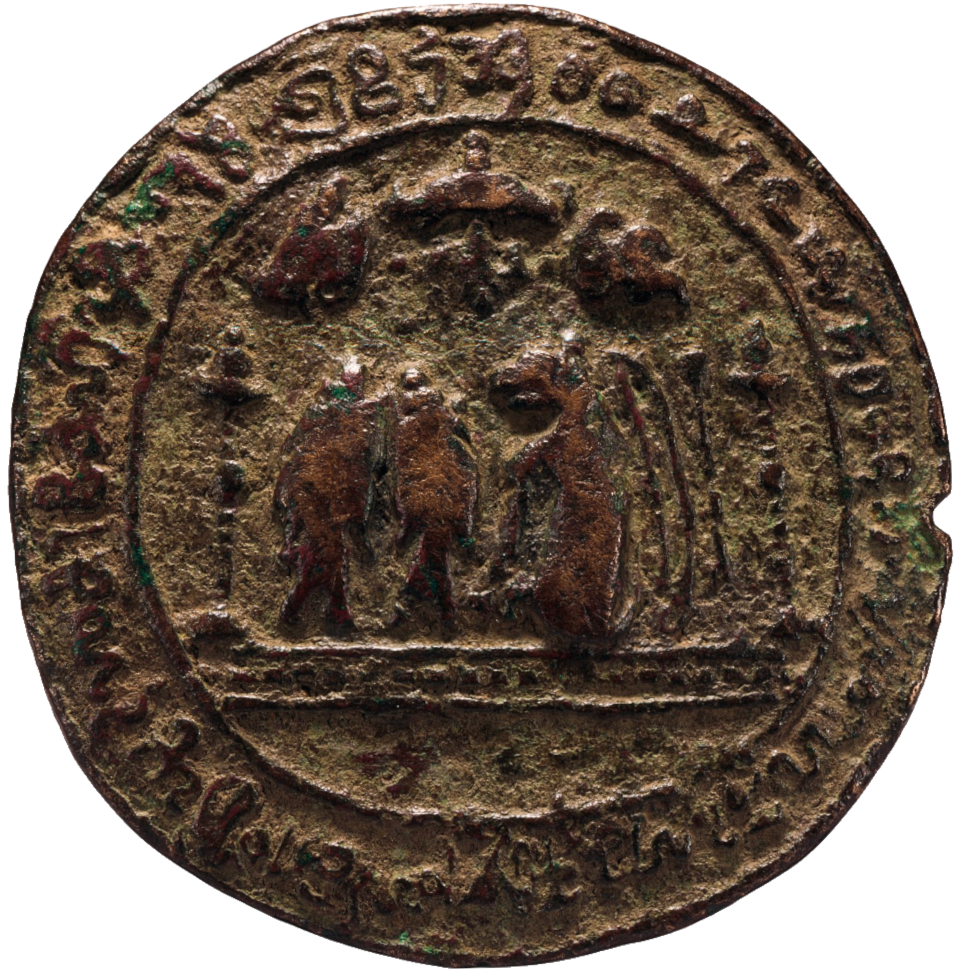
- Seal of Rajendra I.
- Founded: 300 BC
- Disbanded: 1280 CE
- Headquarters: Thanjavur, Chola Empire; Gangaikonda Cholapuram, Chola Empire

Related articles
- History: Wars: Pallava-Pandya wars; Pallava–Chalukya Conflict; Govinda III's Southern Campaign; Chola - Pandya wars; Annexation of Kalinga and Bengal, 1019–1024; Chola–Chalukya wars; Chola - chera wars (1070 - 1124AD); Pandyan Civil War (1169–1177); Invasions: Early Chola invasion of Anuradhapura (205 BC); Karikala Chola Invasion of Srilanka; Conquest of Anuradhapura, 993; Conquest of the Chera Kingdom and Pandya Kingdom 1018–1019 CE; Conquest of the Maldives, Kavaratti and Lakshadweep islands; Conquest of the Kalinga; Conquest of the Ganges; Chola conquest of Chandra dynasty; Conquest of Pegu, 1023-1025; Chola conquest of the Nicobar island, 1023-1025; Invasion of Srivijaya, 1025; Chola conquest of the Langkasuka kingdom; Chola invasion of Malaysia, 1028; Invasion of Kadaram, 1068; Invasion of Kalinga, 1097; Invasion of Kalinga, 1110; Battles: Battle of Kalumalam; Battle of Kariyaru; Battle of Vijuthapura(161 or 162 BC); Battle of Venni (130 CE); Battle of Vahaipparandalai (2nd century CE); Battle of Nerivayil (2nd century CE); Battle of Talaiyalanganam ( 3rd century CE); Battle of Thirupurambiyam (879 CE); Battle of Vellur (910 CE); Battle of Vallala (911 CE); Battle of Kodumbai (10th century CE); Battle of Takkolam (949 CE); Battle of Chevur (959 CE); Battle of Kandalur Salai (988 CE); Battle of Panasoge (1000 CE); Battle of Udagai (1003 CE); Battle of Kalavur (1006 CE); Battle of Donur (1007 CE); Battle of Rohana(1017 CE); Battle of Maski (1019 – 1020 CE); Battle of Pundur; Battle of Dannada; Battle of Koppam (1054 CE); Battle of Mudakkaru (1060 CE); First Battle of Kudal-Sangamam (1062 CE); Second Battle of Kudal-Sangamam (1067 CE); Battle of Vijayawada (1068); Battle of Kampili (1068 CE); Battle of Nangili (1076 CE); Battle of Godavari (1133 CE); Battle of Nettur (1188 CE)

The Imperial Chola Army (Tamil: சோழர் படை) refers to the army of the Chola Empire. The Chola military fought dozens of wars, and it also underwent numerous changes in structure, organization, equipment and tactics, while conserving a core of lasting Tamil traditions.

== Pre-Imperial Sangam period (300 BC – 300 AD) ==
It has not been possible to assemble an internal chronology of the Sangam works and pinpoint when and how the early Chola military was formed.

The Chola state maintained a well-equipped standing army of professional soldiers. Military commanders were honored with the title of ēnāti, conferred in a formal investiture ceremony by the king.

"You, when you see a fight, you rush to the front, divide your enemy’s forces, stand before them, and get your body scarred by the deep cuts of their swords; thus are you (your fame is) pleasant to the ear, not so your body to the eye. As for them (your enemies), when they see you, they turn their backs, and with bodies whole and unscarred, they are pleasant to the eye, not so (their infamy) to the ear. Hence, you are pleasant in one way, they in another; what is there else in which they do not equal you? Yet, what wonder is it, tell us, noble one! that this world cherishes you, O Killi, of the fleet steed and of the victorious anklet-adorned foot."

=== Karikala Chola ===
Karikala Chola stands pre-eminent amongst all those mentioned in Pattinappaalai. 'Karikala' means 'elephant feller' or 'charred leg', which is assumed to be a reference to an accident by fire that befell the prince early in his life. Pattinappaalai describes this accident and the enterprising way in which the prince escaped and established himself on the Chola throne. Pattinappalai is a poem on the then Chola capital Kaveripattinam and describes the numerous battles Karikala fought against the Cheras and Pandyas, including the famous Battle of Venni where the Chola army defeated a confederacy of (about) a dozen rulers headed by Chera and Pandya kings. Following the battle, the Chera king was disgraced (received a wound on his back) and committed suicide. Karikala thus broke the confederacy that was formed against him, conquered the Chera and Pandya kingdoms, and established Chola hegemony over Tamilakam. After the Battle of Venni, Karikala defeated the confederacy of nine minor chieftains in the Battle of Vakaipparandalai. He also invaded Sri Lanka and took away, among other things, 12,000 Sinhalese men to work as slaves in the construction of the Kallanai Dam.

The poet Kovur Kilar mentions a protracted civil war between two Chola chieftains Nalankilli and Nedunkilli. Nedunkilli isolated himself in a fort in Avur, which was being besieged by Mavalattan, Nalankilli's younger brother. The poet chided Nedunkilli to come out and fight like a man instead of causing untold misery to the people of the city. In another poem, the poet begs both the princes to give up the civil war as whoever wins, the loser will be a Chola.

Kalavali by Poygayar mentions the Chola King Kocengannan and his battle with the Chera king Kanaikkal Irumporai. The Chera was taken prisoner and Poygayar, who was a friend of the Chera, sang a poem praising the Chola King Kochchenganan in 40 stanzas. The Chola king, pleased with the work, released the Chera. Kalavali describes the battle fought at Kalumalam, near the Chera capital. Kocengannan is one of the 63 nayanars. Kocengannan became the subject of many instances in later times and is portrayed as a pious Siva devotee who built many fine temples for Siva along the banks of the river Kaveri.

== Imperial Chola army ==
The Chola dynasty faded into darkness after c. 300 CE. During this period, the Cholas lost their sovereignty in Tamilakam and held on to their old capital city of Urayur by serving as a vassal state under the Kalabhra and Pallava dynasties and by making use of the opportunity during a war between the Pandyas and Pallavas, Vijayalaya Chola rose out of obscurity and captured Thanjavur and re-established the Chola dynasty. In 852 CE, Vijayalaya Chola declared war on the Pandyas and defeated them and at the same time, the Cholas became so powerful that the Pallavas were also wiped out from the Thanjavur region at a later stage. The Medieval Chola Empire traced their ancestry to the ancient Tamil King, Karikala, making him the dynasty's ancestral father.

== Organization and administration ==
Cholas recruited military personnel of four types: soldiers of hereditary military families, soldiers raised from various tribes, personnel provided by various tradesmen and merchants, and mercenaries.

In addition to the divisions, there were the Nadapu—the commissariat and Payanam—the admiralty and logistics. The addition to these, bureaucratic reforms revolutionized the Chola Army, resulting in victories on a massive scale.

=== Famous generals ===
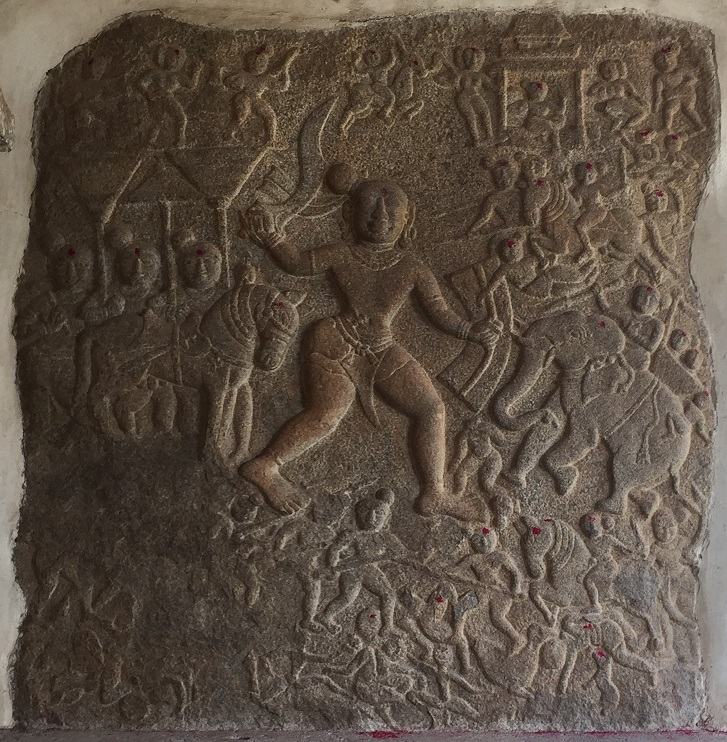
Rajendra I at battle in Karnataka.

There were hundreds of generals in the Medieval Chola Army, some notable commanders include:

- Senathipathi Araiyan Rajarajan (11th century)
  - Younger brother of Rajendra Chola I and highest ranking general of the Chola Army during their victories against the Western Chalukya dynasty, Somavamsi dynasty, the Pala Kingdom, and the Kamboja Pala dynasty
- Senathipathi Abrameya Pallavan, was the commander-in-chief of Rajaraja Chola.
  - He was the commander in kandalur salai battle 988CE and also in the Kudamalai battle in 994 CE where Prince Rajendra led the forces.
- Senathipathi Aditha Karikalan (10th Century)
  - Commander of Northern Troops, He led the army against Pandyas and defeated the Pandya king Veerapandyan at the Battle of Chevur.
- Senathipathi Vallavaraiyan Vandiyadevan (10th–11th century)
  - Commander of the Sri Lanka Front Army of Rajaraja l and Rajendra I during the Chola conquest of Anuradhapura
- Senathipathi Karunakara Tondaiman (Late 11th century)
  - Famous general during the reign of Kulottunga Chola I who defeated the Kalinga armies of King Anantavarman and went on to plunder Lanka
  - The Karunakara Pillaiyar temple in the Jaffna peninsula was built after him. The village, Thondaimanaru, in Ceylon, was also named after him
- Senathipathi Naralokaviran (Late 11th century)
  - General during the reign of Kulottunga Chola I and his successor Vikrama Chola who led many Chola campaigns in the deep south and distinguished himself in the Pandya Wars
- Senathipathi Paluvettaraiyar Maravan Kandanar (Late 10th century)
  - An important general during the reign of Parantaka Chola II who strengthened the Pazhuvettaraiyar regiment that was actively deployed during the Chola conquest of Anuradhapura
- Thalapathi Thiruchitrambalamudaiyan Perumanambi (Late 12th century)
  - Defeated Polonnaruwa Army generals Lankapura Dandanatha and Jagad Vijaya in battle and successfully re-conquered the Pandyan Kingdom on behalf of Rajadhiraja Chola II during the Pandyan Civil War (1169–1177)
- Anipathi Annan Pallavarayan (Late 12th century)
  - Invaded Polonnaruwa and destroyed parakramabahu's preparations for the invasion of Chola Nadu and provided support for Sinhalese Prince Sri Vallabha, nephew of Parakramabahu and a rival claimant to the Polonnaruwa throne

== Regiments ==
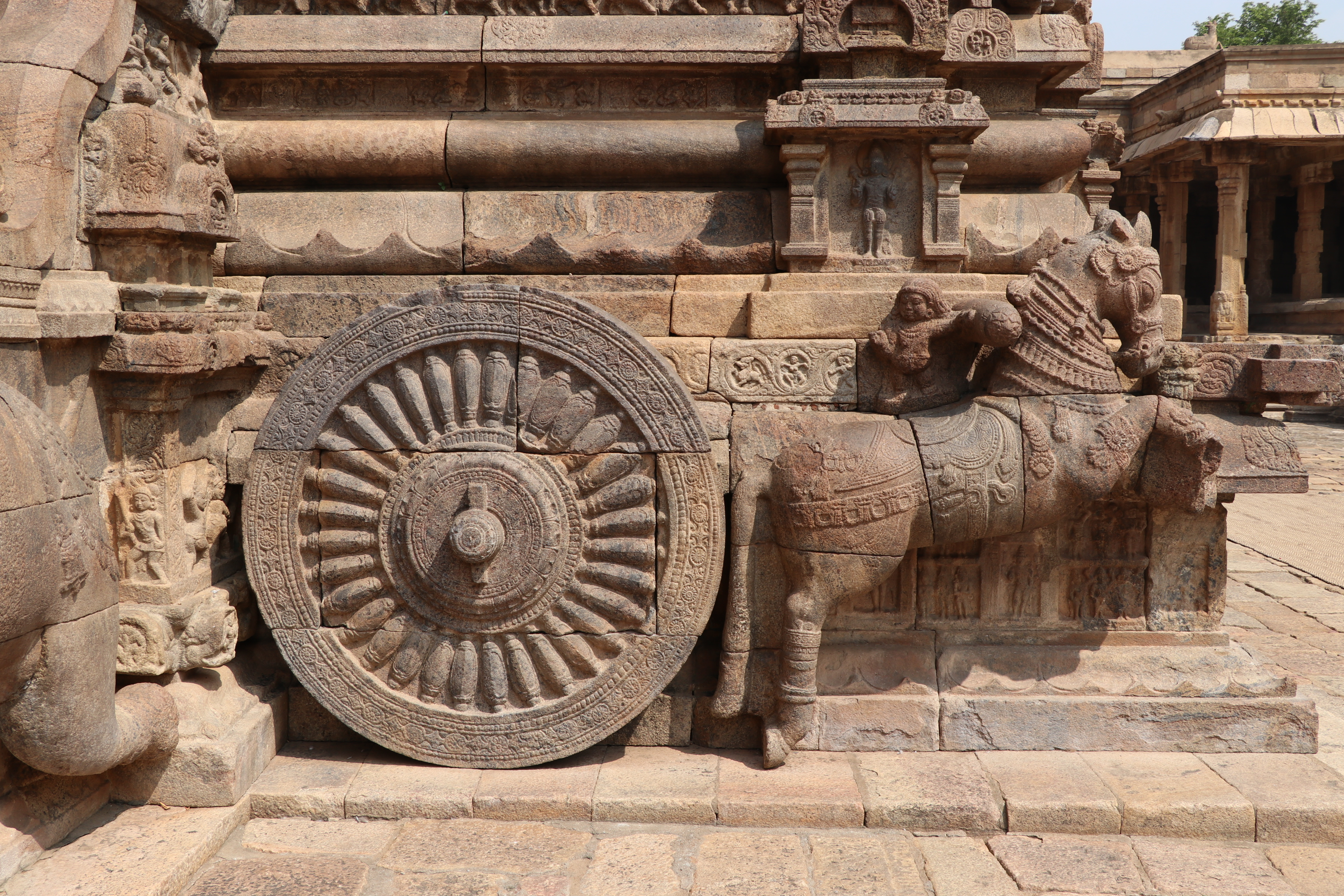
Horse-drawn chariots used by the Chola Army

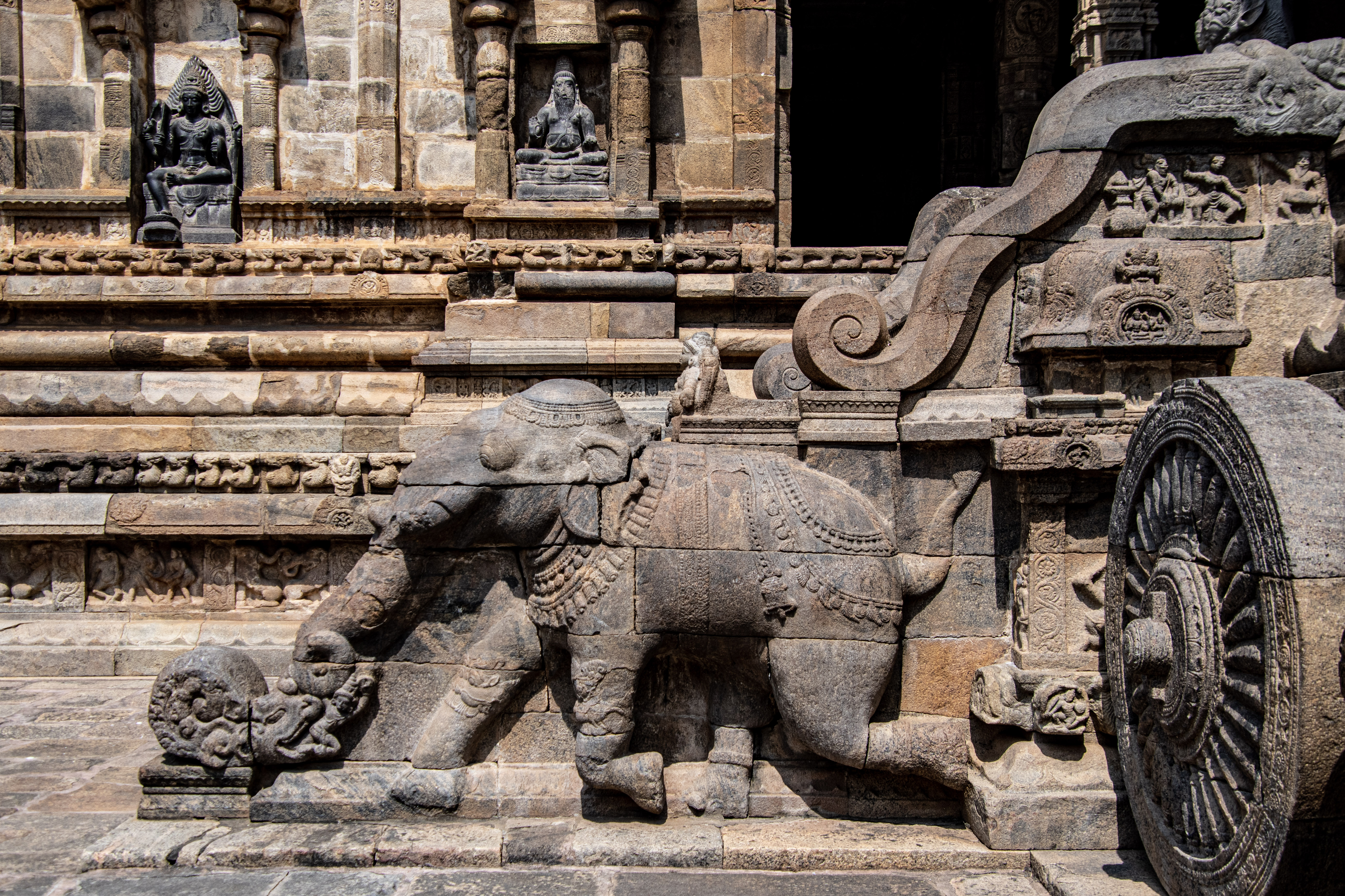
Elephants used in battle

Chola inscriptions mention numerous regiments by specific names. Rajaraja Chola I created a powerful standing army and a considerable navy, which achieved even greater success under his son Rajendra Chola I. The prominence given to the army from the conquest of the Pandyas down to the last year of the king's reign is significant and shows the spirit with which the king treated his soldiers. Rajaraja gave his army its due share in the glory derived from his extensive conquests. The army was composed chiefly of Kaikolars (Weavers), which were royal troops receiving regular payments from the treasury (e.g. Arul mozhideva-terinda-kaikola padai; in this, arulmozhideva is the king's name, terinda means well known, and padai means regime). Kaikolars were also a part-time weavers who formed battalions during wartime.

Some of the well-known Kaikola battalions were:

- Singalantaka-terinda-Kaikkolar
- Virachozha-terinja-Kaikkolar
- Kodandarama-terinja-Kaikkolar
- Danatonga-terinja-Kaikkolar
- Parantaka-terinja-Kaikkolar
- Muthuvalpetra-Kaikkolar
- Samarakesarit-terinja-Kaikkolar
- Vikramasingat-terinja-Kaikkolar
- Adityapanma-terinda-Kaikkolar
- Karikala-chozha-terinja-Kaikkolar
- Arulmozhideva-terinja-Kaikkolar
- Parttivasekarat-terinja-Kaikkolar
- Gandaraditta-terinja-Kaikkolar
- Madurantaka-terinja-Kaikkolar

Kodandarama-terinja-Kaikkolar is named after Aditya Chola I who had another name Kodandarama. Smarakesarit-terinja-Kaikkolar and Vikramasingat-terinja-Kaikkolar derived their names from possible titles of Parantaka Chola I. Gandaraditta-terinja-Kaikkolar must have been the name of a regiment named after king Gandaraditya Chola, the father of Uttama Chola. Singalantaka-terinda-Kaikkolar, a regiment named after Singalantaka i.e. Parantaka Chola I. Danatunga-terinja-Kaikkolar (regiment or group). The early writing of the record and the surname Danatunga of Parantaka I suggest its assignment to his reign. Muthuvalpetra, meaning the “recipient of the pearl ornamented sword” in Tamil seems to indicate some special honour or rank conferred on the regiment by the king. Arulmozhideva-terinja-Kaikkolar is named after Raja Raja Chola I.

The following regiments are mentioned in the Tanjavur inscriptions:

- Uttama- Chola-terinda-Andalagattalar
- Perundanattu Anaiyatkal — Elephant corps.
- Pandita-Chola-Terinda-villigal — Archers
- Nigarili- Chola terinda-Udanilai-Kudiraichchevagar — Cavalry
- Mummadi- Chola-terinda-Anaippagar — Elephant corps
- Vira- Chola-Anukkar
- Parantaka-Kongavalar — Light Infantry
- Mummadi- Chola-terinda-parivarattar
- Keralantaka-terinda-parivarattar
- Mulaparivara-vitteru alias Jananatha-terinda-parivarattar
- Singalantaka-terinda-parivarattar
- Sirudanattu Vadugakkalavar
- Valangai-Parambadaigalilar
- Sirudanattu-Valangai -Velaikkarappadaigal
- Aragiya- Chola-terinda-Valangai-Velaikkarar
- Aridurgalanghana-terinda-Valangai-Velaikkarar
- Chandaparakrama-terinda-Valangai-Velaikkarar
- Ilaiya-Rajaraja-terinda-Valangai-Velaikkarar
- Kshatriyasikhamani-terinda-Valangai-Velaikkarar
- Murtavikramabharana-terinda-Valangai-Velaikkarar
- Rajakanthirava-terinda-Valangai-Velaikkarar
- Rajaraja-terinda-Valangai-Velaikkarar
- Rajavinoda-terinda-Valangai-Velaikkarar
- Ranamukha-Bhima-terinda-Valangai-Velaikkarar
- Vikramabharana-terinda-Valangai-Velaikkarar
- Keralantaka-vasal-tirumeykappar
- Anukka-vasal-tirumeykappar — Personal bodyguards
- Parivarameykappargal — Personal bodyguards
- Palavagai-Parampadaigalilar
- Perundanattu-Valangai-Velaikkarappadaigal

Velaikkarappadaigal or Velaikkarar is the equivalent of "Guards regiment" or "King's Regiment"—a royal suffix given in honour of their loyalty and bravery. Historian Burton Stein equates the Valangai military forces (Perumpadai Valangai Mahasenai) and the Velaikkara troops of the Cholas with the Vellalars and notes that the contents of the two identical Tamil inscriptions from Avani and Uttanur in Mulbagal Taluk, dated in the 3rd year of Kulottunga I, confirm this identification. Some historians also propose that they were drawn from the civilian population during wartime, suggesting they were more like the National Guard. They are mentioned in the Mahavamsa; according to that account, the Sinhalese kingdom tried to use them as mercenaries against the Chola empire. They were later silenced and decommissioned when they refused and rebelled.

There are almost seventy such regiments that have been found in these inscriptions. In most of the foregoing names, the first portion appears to be the surnames or titles of the king himself or that of his son. That these regiments were called after the king or his son shows the attachment that the Chola king bore towards his army.

It may not be unreasonable to suppose that these royal names were prefixed to the designations of these regiments after they had distinguished themselves in some engagement or other. It is worthy of note that there are elephant troops, cavalry and foot soldiers among these regiments.

Top officers took various titles after the different kings such as Rajaraja Chola Brahmarajan, Rajarajakesari Muvendavelar, Jayamkondachola Villuparaiyar, Uttamachola Muvendavelar, Manukula Muvendavelar, Nittavinotha Muvendavelar, Atirajendra Muvendavelar, Mummudi chola pallavaraiyar, and Viranarayanan Muvendavelan. Among these, Brahmarāyar were given to Brahmins, Mūvēndavēḷār were bestowed upon Vellalars, and Pallavarāyar was given to Vellalars or other non-Brahmins.

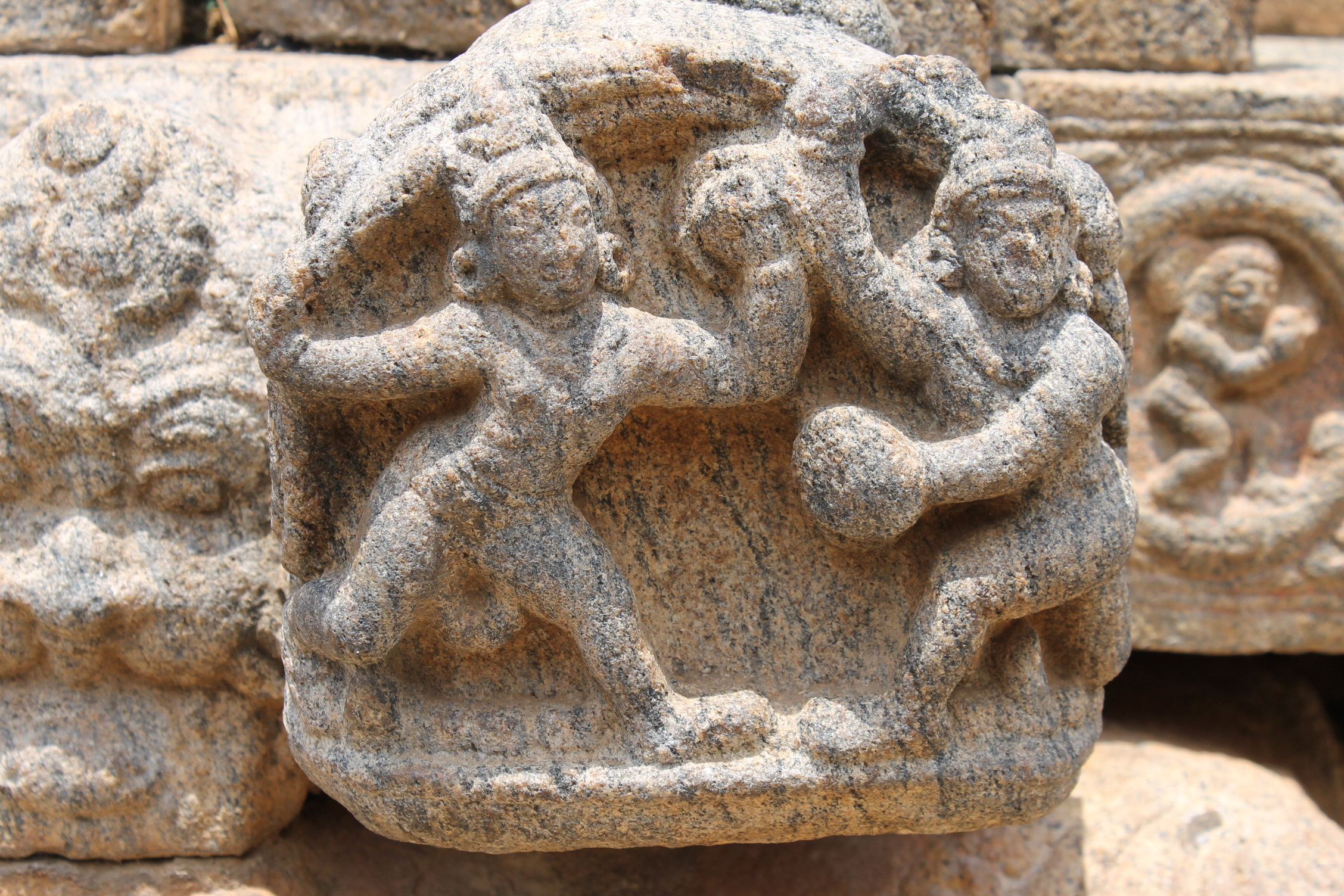
Chola troops in battle

== Garrisons ==
The military administration system of the Chola dynasty in ancient India was a meticulously planned and executed strategy to ensure the security and stability of their vast empire. The army was stationed throughout the country in the form of local garrisons and cantonments, commonly known as "Kadagams." These garrisons were established in strategic locations to provide immediate security to the surrounding regions. They also served as administrative centres for the collection of taxes, maintenance of law and order, and the dispensation of justice.

The Cholas' military administration system extended beyond their borders, with garrisons stationed in the territories they had conquered. These garrisons were responsible for the collection of taxes and the maintenance of law and order in these regions. They also acted as a deterrent against any rebellion or uprising, thereby ensuring the continued subjugation of the conquered territories.

The Cholas' military administration system was not limited to the establishment of garrisons and cantonments. They also maintained a well-trained and well-equipped army that was ready to respond to any threat to the empire's security. The Cholas also had a navy that patrolled the seas around their empire, protecting their trade routes and preventing piracy.

Overall, the Cholas' military administration system was a testament to their foresight and strategic planning. It provided security and stability to their empire, ensuring its continued prosperity and longevity. Following the Chola conquest of Anuradhapura, Senathipathi of the Sri Lanka Front Army of Rajaraja l and Rajendra I, Vallavaraiyan Vandiyadevan, garrisoned the city of Polonnaruwa to administer control over the island and deter any attempt of reconquest by the Sinhalese armies. After the troubles in the Pandya country, Kulothunga Chola I stationed his army in several military colonies along the main route to Pandya from Chola lands. One such colony was found at Kottaru and another at Madavilagam near South Arcot district in Tamil Nadu.

== Navy ==
The maritime force of the Chola dynasty was established with ships primarily utilized for trade and transportation. Notably, the dynasty lacked a dedicated ship for naval combat. Instead, these ships were repurposed to transport the land army overseas. The Chola maritime force consisted of several types of ships, such as the Kalamukha, Manthai, and Sandhani ships. The Kalamukha was a warship equipped with a battering ram, while the Manthai was a cargo ship with a capacity of up to 500 passengers. The Sandhani was designed specifically to transport horses and elephants overseas. Despite the lack of a ship designed for naval battles, the Chola dynasty maintained a formidable maritime force through the strategic utilization of their ships for both trade and transportation purposes.
