= Chola Expedition of the Ganges =

Chola expedition into Ganges (1019-1021)

Date	1019–1021 AD
Location	Odisha, Chhattisgarh, Uttar Pradesh, Madhya Pradesh, Jharkhand, Bihar, West Bengal, Bangladesh
Result	Chola victory
Territorial changes	Telangana, Andhra Pradesh, Chhattisgarh, Kalinga, Jharkhand,(Bengal temporarily) annexed as vassal states of the Chola dynasty

Belligerents
Chola dynasty	Somavamsi dynasty (Kalinga); Odda dynasty; Pala Empire; Kamboja Pala dynasty; Chandra dynasty

Commanders and leaders
Emperor: Rajendra Chola; Commander-in-Chief: Araiyan Rajarajan; Commanders: Pallavarayan; Miladudaiyar	Kings: Indraratha (Kalinga); Odda king (Odda); Dharmapala (Dandabhukti); Ranasura (Radhepura); Govindachandra (Bengal); Mahipala (Pala Empire)

Units involved
Chola Army	Pala Army; Somavamsi Army; Odda Army; Radhepura Army; Kamboja Pala Army; Chandra Army

Strength
1,000,000+	100,000

Casualties and losses
Few	Many

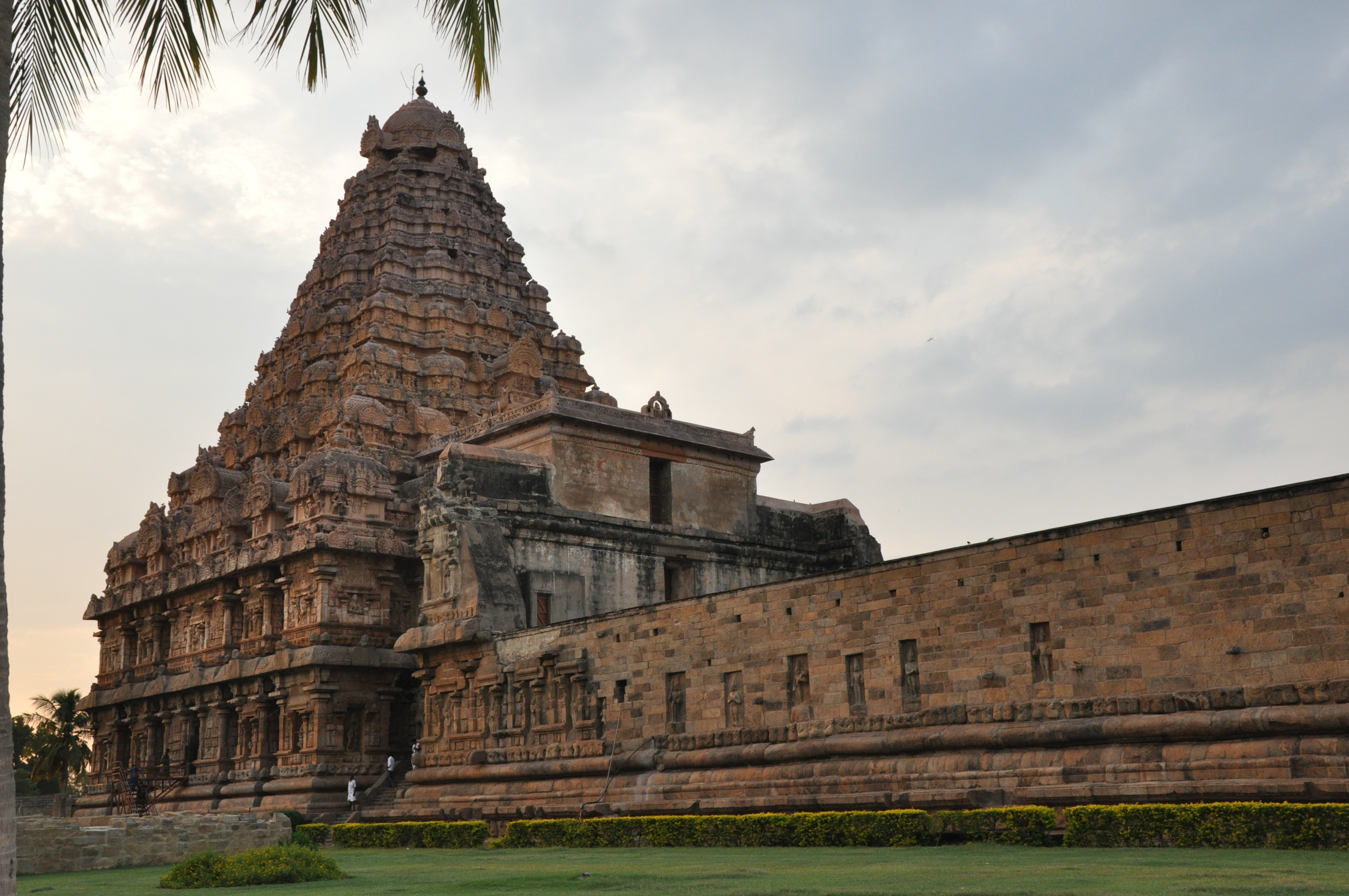
Gangaikonda Cholapuram was built by Rajendra Chola to celebrate his success in the Ganges Expedition

The Medieval Chola emperor Rajendra Chola I led an Chola Expedition of the Ganges between 1019 and 1021. The expedition traversed the states of Vengi, Kalinga, Madhya Pradesh, Jharkhand, Odisha, Bengal, Bihar and Uttar Pradesh culminating with their arrival at the Ganges river. The Chola victory over the Pala king Mahipala I is considered to be the climax of the expedition. In 1019 CE, Rajendra's forces marched through Kalinga towards the river Ganga. In Kalinga the Chola forces defeated Indraratha the ruler of the Somavamsi dynasty. The Chola army eventually reached the Pala kingdom of Bengal where they defeated Mahipala. The Chola army also defeated the last ruler of the Kamboja Pala dynasty Dharmapala of Dandabhukti. The Chola army went on to raid East Bengal and defeated Govindachandra of the Chandra dynasty and invaded Bastar region.

== Causes ==
The expedition is believed to have been necessitated by a succession dispute in the Eastern Chalukya kingdom where the claims of Rajaraja Narendra, the son of Vimaladitya, the previous king, and his queen Kundavai, were contested by Vishnuvardana Vijayaditya VII, a son of Vimaladitya through another wife. Vishnuvardhana Vijayaditya VII was supported by the Western Chalukya king Jayasimha II and the kings of Kalinga and Odda and posed a serious threat to Rajaraja Narendra. Rajaraja Narendra appealed for help from his maternal uncle, the Chola emperor, Rajendra Chola I who sent a large force under his general, Araiyan Rajarajan, a veteran of the Chalukya-Chola Wars. Araiyan Rajarajan defeated Vijayaditya and after driving of it him out, firmly established Rajaraja Narendra on the Eastern Chalukya throne.

Following this victory, Rajendra Chola I led an expedition northwards supported by an advance guard led by Araiyan Rajarajan, to punish the kings of Kalinga and Odda who had sided with Vijayaditya in the succession dispute.

== Events ==
The Thiruvalangadu plates state:

The light of the Chola race (Rajendra Chola I), mocking Bhagiratha who by the force of his austerities caused the descent of the Ganga, set out to sanctify his own land with the waters of that stream brought (thither) by the strength of his arm

Rajendra Chola I defeated the kings of Kalinga and Odda (by seeking assistance of Paramaras and Kalachuris, with whom Indraratha was in a big conflict and Rajendra Chola exploited this situation) and marched up to the Godavari River, from where Araiyan Rajarajan led an army into Bengal. The details of the campaign are given in the Tamil praśasti of Rajendra Chola I.

(He seized) Śakkarakkōţţam, whose warriors were brave; Madura-maṇḍalam destroyed in a trice, the prosperous city of Nāmaṇaik-kōṇam with its dense groves. Pañcap-paḷḷi whose warriors (bore) cruel bows, Māśunideśa with its green fields; a large heap of family-treasures with many (other) treasures (which he carried away), after having conquered Indraratha of the ancient race of the moon, together with (his) family, in a fight which took place at Ādinagar, (a city) whose fame knew no decline; Oḍḍa-viṣaya which was difficult of approach on account of its dense forest defence; the good Kōśalai-nāḍu where Brahmins assembled; Taṇḍabutti in whose gardens bees abounded, (land which he acquired) after having destroyed Dharmapāla (in) a hot battle; Takkaṇalāḍam, whose fame reached (all) directions, (and which he occupied) after having forcibly attacked Raṇaśura; Vangāḷa-deśā, where the rain water never stopped, (and from which) Gōvindacandra fled, having descended (from his) male elephant; elephants of rare strength, women and treasure, (which he seized) after having been pleased to put to flight in a hot battlefield the strong Mahipāla by the sound of a conch from the deep sea; Uttiralāḍam (on the shore of) the expansive ocean (producing) pearls; and the Gangā whose waters bearing flagrant flowers dashed against the bathing places (tirtha)

Sakkarakottam, the place from where Araiyan Rajarajan led the campaign into Bengal is identified with the town of Chakrakotya or Chitrakoot, in present-day Madhya Pradesh. Masunidesam, Maduraimandalam, Namanaikkonam and Pancapalli, too, are believed to be located to the north-west of Vengi. Following the conquest of these places in present-day Telangana, Madhya Pradesh and Chhattisgarh, Araiyan Rajarajan invaded Odda (present-day Orissa) and conquered it after defeating its ruler Indraratha. His next success was against Dharmapala, who ruled the kingdom of Dandabhukti located in the marshland between Orissa and Bengal. Rajarajan, then, defeated Ranasura, the ruler of Lada or Radha, identified as the part of West Bengal west of the Ganges River and Govindachandra of Vangala, located further to the east before confronting the Pala ruler Mahipala I. After defeating Mahipala in a pitched battle, Araiyan Rajarajan reached the Ganges and took some water with him on his journey back. He was met by Rajendra I on the banks of the Godavari and the combined armies returned home after conducting Rajaraja Narendra's coronation as the king of the Eastern Chalukyas.

== Nature of the expedition ==
There has been general disagreement among historians on the nature of the expedition. Early scholars such as V. Venkayya interpreted Rajendra Chola's campaign to "bring the waters of the Ganges into Chola territory" as a pilgrimage to the Ganges River. However, this theory has been refuted by some historians, most notable among them being K. A. Nilakanta Sastri. That the campaign was military in nature is suggested by the last line of the Thiruvalangadu plates which state that the king erected a Ganga-jalamayam jayasthambham or a "liquid pillar of victory" in the form of the Cholaganga tank.

== Effects ==
The Chola expedition to the Ganges had a long-lasting influence. According to R. D. Banerji, a Kannadiga chief who accompanied Araiyan Rajarajan on his campaign settled down in Bengal and founded the Sena dynasty. It is believed that the Karnata people of Mithila, too, might have descended from soldiers in the Chola army. The Siddhantasaravali of Trilocana Sivacharya claims that a large number of Saivite Brahmins from Bengal were taken to the Chola country where they were granted lands by Rajendra Chola I. They, eventually, settled down in Kanchipuram and the Cauvery Delta forming the Sivacharya community.
