= Rajaraja I =

Chola emperor from 985 to 1014

- Rājakēsari Varman,, Mum'muṭi Coḻa, Sivapathasekaran, Thirumurai Kanda Chola, Taila Kula Kaalan, Telungu kula kaalan, Pandiya Kula Sani, Keralandhagan, Sinhalandhagan, Kṣatriya Śikhāmaṇi
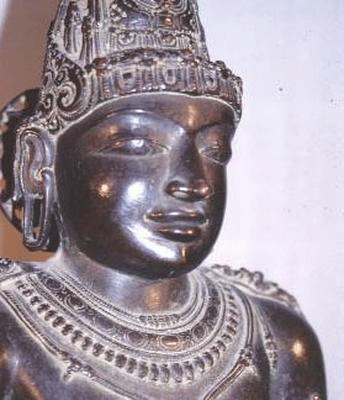
- Bronze portrait of Rajaraja Chola, 11th century, Brihadisvara Temple.

Chola Emperor
- Reign: June/July 985–January or February 1014
- Predecessor: Uttama
- Successor: Rajendra I

King of Anuradhapura
- Reign: c. 992 – c. January/February 1014
- Predecessor: Mahinda V
- Successor: Rajendra I
- Born: Arul Mozhi Varman; 3 November 947; Thanjavur, Chola Empire (modern-day Tamil Nadu, India)
- Died: January 1014 (aged 66); Thanjavur, Chola Empire
- Spouse: Thiripuvana Madeviyar; Lokamahadevi; Cholamahadevi; Tirilokyamahadevi; Panchavanmahadevi; Abhimanavallimahadevi; Latamahadevi; Prithivimahadevi; Ulagamahadevi; Meenavanmahadevi; Thiruponamahadevi; Villavanmahadevi; Veeranarayanimahadevi; NathanthillaiAlagiMahadevi; Kaadanthongimahadevi; Ponpichimahadevi; Thailamahadevi
- Issue: Rajendra I; Araiyan Rajarajan; Arulmozhi Chandramalli alias Gangamadevi; Mathevadigal
Regnal name
- Rāja Rāja Cola (or) Rāja Rāja I
- Dynasty: Chola
- Father: Parantaka II
- Mother: Vanavan Mahadevi
- Religion: Hinduism; See details

Rājarāja I (Middle Tamil: Rājarāja Colan; Rājarāja Śōḷa; 3 November 947 – January/February 1014), also known as Rajaraja the Great, was a Chola emperor who reigned from 985 to 1014. He was known for his conquests of southern India and the Anuradhapura kingdom of Sri Lanka, as well as increasing Chola influence across the Indian Ocean. Rajaraja's birth name is Arulmozhi Varman.

Rajaraja's empire encompassed vast territories, including regions of the Pandya country, the Chera country, and northern Sri Lanka. He also extended his influence over strategic islands such as Lakshadweep, Thiladhunmathi atoll, and parts of the Maldives in the Indian Ocean. His conquests were not limited to the south; he also launched successful campaigns against the Western Gangas and the Western Chalukyas, extending Chola authority as far as the Tungabhadra River. In the east, Rajaraja faced fierce opposition from the Telugu Chola king Jata Choda Bhima over control of Vengi. This region held significant strategic importance due to its access to resources and trade routes. The conflict between the two rulers intensified as they vied for dominance in the region, resulting in significant battles and shifting allegiances.

Rajaraja I commissioned the construction of the Rajarajeshwaram Temple in the Chola capital of Thanjavur, revered as one of the most prominent examples of the medieval South Indian architectural style. Additionally, during his reign, important Tamil literary works by poets such as Appar, Sambandar, and Sundarar were gathered and compiled into a single collection known as the Thirumurai. This earned him the title of 'Thirumurai Kanda Cholar' (lit. 'The One Who Found Thirumurai'). He initiated a project of land survey and assessment in 1000 which led to the reorganisation of Tamil country into individual units known as valanadus. Rajaraja died in 1014, and was succeeded by his son Rajendra Chola I.

== Early life ==
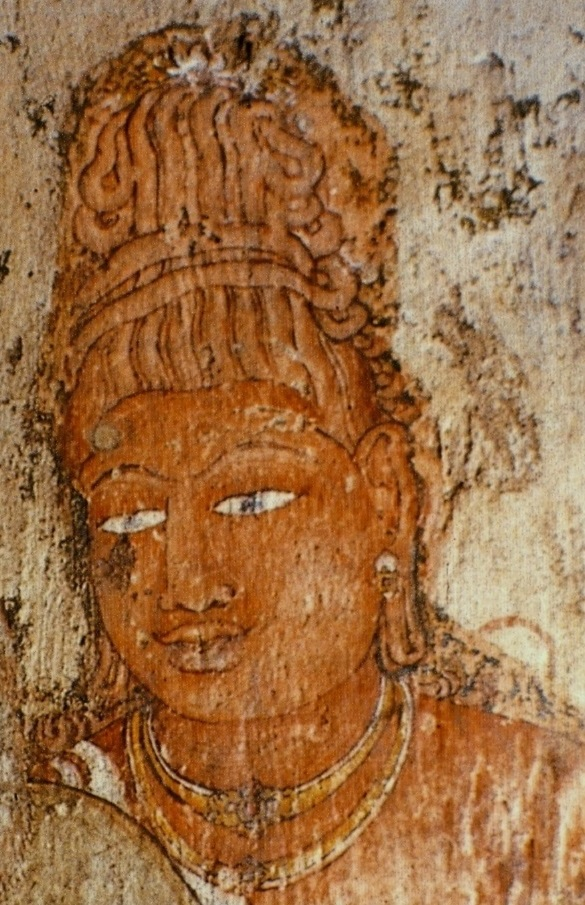
Mural of Rajaraja

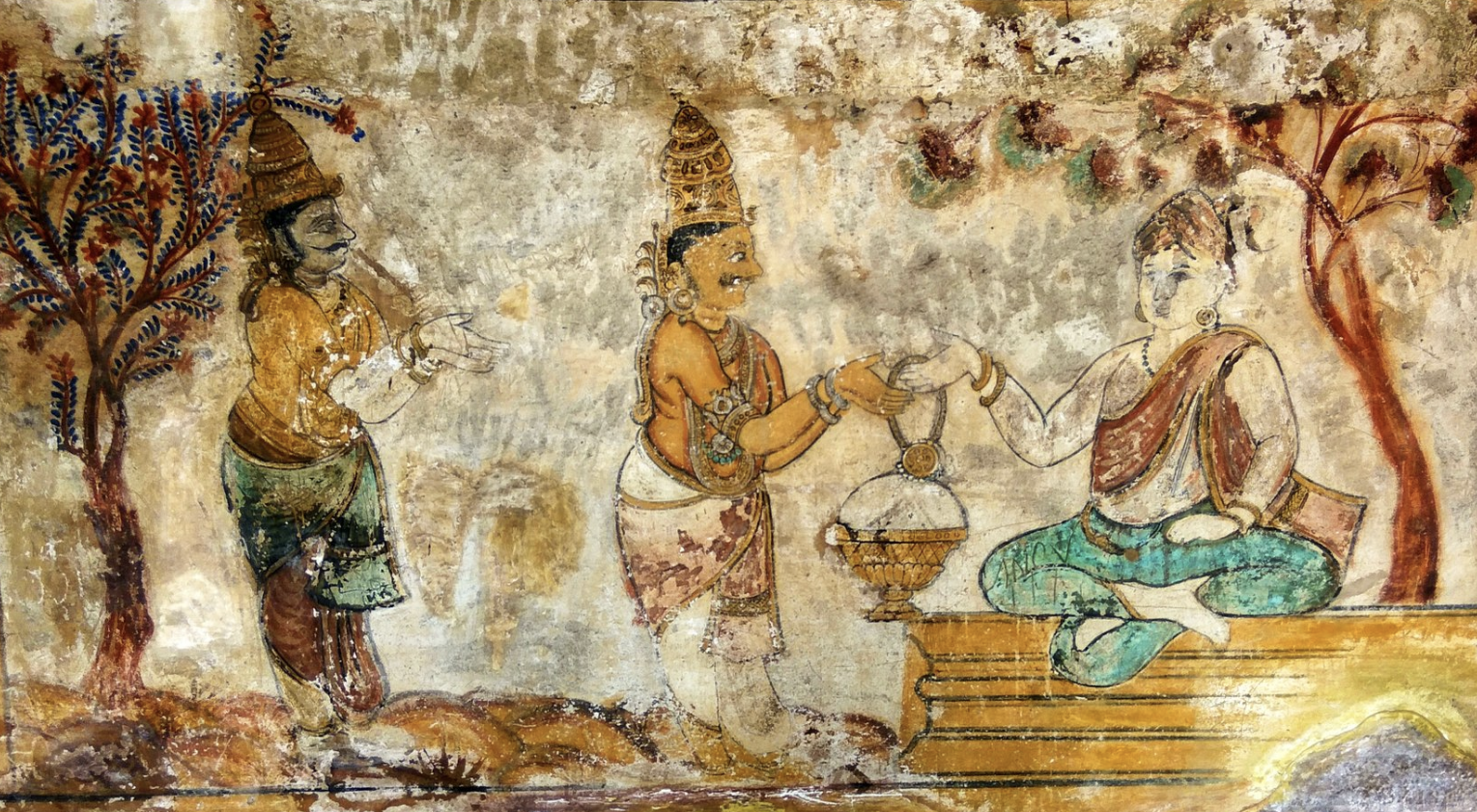
Rajaraja and his brother Aditha Karikalan meeting their guru

Rajaraja was the son of the Imperial Chola king Parantaka II, also known as Sundara Chola, and his wife Vanavan Mahadevi of the Malaiyaman family . As recorded in the Thiruvalangadu copper-plate inscription, his birth name was Arunmozhi Varman, meaning "The Word of Sun Clan". According to Thiruvilandur Copper Plate inscription, his birth name was recorded as Arulmoli. He was born around 947 during the Tamil month of Aippasi, under the Sadhayam star. The Government of Tamil Nadu recognises his birthdate as 3 November 947. Rajaraja had an elder brother, Prince Aditha II, and an elder sister, Princess Kundavai.

Rajaraja's accession marked the end of a period of competing claims to the Chola throne, following the reign of his great-grandfather Parantaka I. After Parantaka I, his elder son Gandaraditya became king. However, upon Gandaraditya's death, his son Madhurantakan was still a minor, so the throne passed to Parantaka I's younger son, Arinjaya. Arinjaya soon died, and his son Parantaka II (Sundara Chola) succeeded him. It was decided that Sundara Chola would be succeeded by Madhurantakan, likely due to Sundara's preference. However, according to the Thiruvalangadu and Thiruvilandur inscription of Rajaraja's son, Rajendra I, the succession plan may have been made by Rajaraja himself. The Thiruvilandur Copper Plate records that Rajaraja observed Madhurantaka earning the respect of the people from a young age. It also states that he was well versed in the Vedas and Sastras and trained in horse, elephant and chariot riding and the use of weapons.

Aditha II died under mysterious circumstances, with inscriptions suggesting he may have been assassinated. Shortly afterwards, Sundara Chola also died, enabling Madhurantakan to assume the throne with the title Uttama Chola. Following Uttama Chola's death, Arul Moli Varman ascended the throne in mid-985 and adopted the regnal name Rajaraja, meaning "King among Kings and the Lord of Wealth."

== Military conquests ==
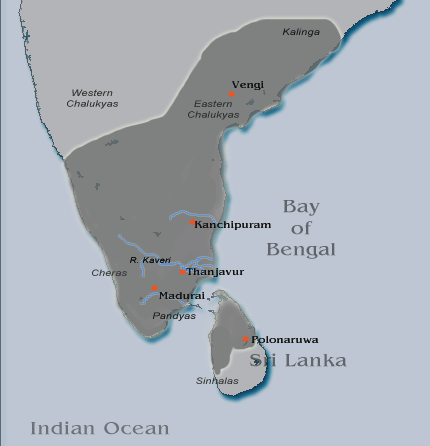
Chola empire during the reign of Rajaraja I

When Rajaraja came to power, he inherited a small kingdom centered around the Thanjavur–Tiruchirappalli region, the heart of traditional Chola territory. He transformed this kingdom from one that was recovering from attacks by the Rashtrakuta Empire into one that was a well-organised Empire with a powerful army and navy. Under his rule, the northern kingdom of Vengi became closely allied with the Cholas, and their influence expanded along the eastern coast all the way up to Kalinga in the north.

“When the Ko-Viraja Raja-Kesarivarma Rajaraja,

marched across, the bee at his lotus feet Panchamaharaya, having obtained the rank of Mahadandanayaka, for Bengimandala and Ganga

mandala displayed .......... He seized Tuluva and Konkana, pursued Maleya, pushed aside and passed over Chera, Tuluga and Rattiga, as if in sport "

—

Rajaraja Chola Thiruvalangadu plates states that, Arulmolivarman :

(performed tulabhara captured the town Vilinda; conquered the Pandya Amarabujanga and burnt the lord of Lanka; defeated Satyashraya; killed Andhra Bhima; conquered the country of Parasurama(i.e.,Chera) and subdued the kings of Ganga, Kalinga, Vengi, Magatha, Aratta, odda, Surashtra and Chalukya).

Rajadhiraja Chola I and Rajendra Chola II, Thiruvilandur Copper Plate states that Arulmoli:

During this king rule, the entire earth was extremely happy. He led a huge army of mighty rutting elephants and invaded the land of the Western Coast, where there are great rivers flowing westward. And, eliminating all the rival kings and their armies, he conquered the Kerala king, who fled away from the battlefield.

The Larger Leiden plates States that Rajaraja,

"conquered the Pandya, Tulu, Kerala, Simhalendra and Satyashraya; destroyed ships at Kandalur-Salai, captured Vengainadu(Vengi), Gangapadi, Nulambapadi, Tadigaipadi, Kudamalainadu, Kollam, Kalingam, and Ilam(Sri Lanka ); and removed the splendour of the Seliyas(i.e.,Pandyas)."

=== Against Kandalur Salai ===
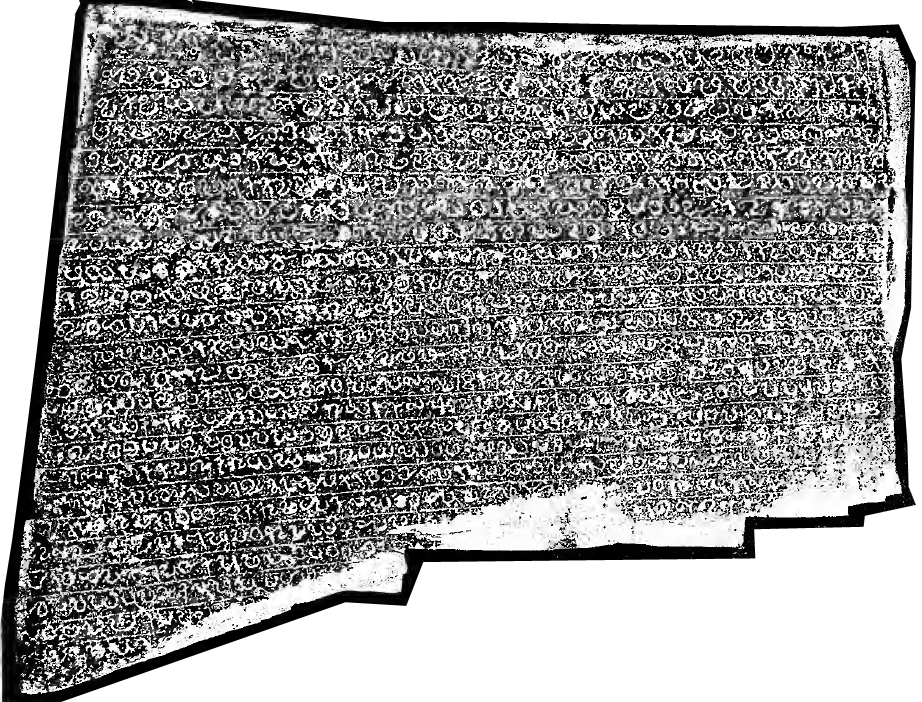
Inscription of Rajaraja in Suchindram, near Kanyakumari

Rajaraja's earliest inscriptions commemorate a significant triumph at Kandalur Salai, located in present-day Kerala, around 988. He is acclaimed as 'Kāndalūr śālai Kalam-arutta', which translates to 'the one who destroyed Kandalur Salai'.

Originally, this area was under the control of the Ay Princes, who served as a vassal to the Pandya king of Madurai. However, it remains uncertain whether warriors from the Chera or Pandya dynasties were involved in this conflict. The Thiruvalangadu inscription suggests that Rajaraja's general captured Vizhinjam (Viḷinam), which could have been part of the Kandalur Salai campaign. It appears that this engagement involved the Chola navy, or possibly a joint operation involving both the navy and the army. Some of the Ay velir fled north merging into the Malayāman dynasty of Tirukoilur, notably the family of Vanavan Mahadevi.

=== Conquest of Kerala and the Pandyas ===
Rajaraja's inscriptions begin to appear in Kanyakumari district in the 990s and in Thiruvananthapuram district in the early 1000s. The Chola subjugation of Kerala can be dated to the early years of the 11th century. The Senur inscription, dated to 1005 and attributed to Rajaraja, records his military achievements. It mentions the destruction of the Pandya capital, Madurai, as well as the conquest of several regions. These include defeating the formidable rulers of Kollam (Venad), Kolla-desham (Mushika), and Kodungallur (the Chera Perumals of Makotai). Some triumphs in the region of Malainadu were possibly achieved by Rajaraja's son, Rajendra Chola.

Following his victory over the Pandyas, Rajaraja assumed the title of Pandya Kulashani, which translates to 'Thunderbolt to the Race of the Pandyas'. As a result of his conquest, the territory of the Pandyas became recognised as "Rajaraja Mandalam" or "Rajaraja Pandinadu". When recounting Rajaraja's military expedition in Trisanku Kastha (the southern region), the Thiruvalangadu Grant of Rajendra I mentions the capture of a certain royal figure named Amarabhujanga. However, the specific identity of this individual—whether he was a prince of the Pandya dynasty, a general serving the Pandya king, or a prince of the Kongu Chera dynasty—remains a matter of debate. According to the Kongu Desa Rajakkal, a historical record of the Kongu Nadu region, it is suggested that this general eventually changed his loyalty to Rajaraja. He is said to have participated in the ritual of kanakabhisheka, where gold is poured over the Chola king, symbolising an act of royal anointment or coronation.

Once Rajaraja had consolidated his authority in the southern regions, he took on the title of Mummudi Chola. This title, which means "Three Crowned", symbolised his power over three important Tamil kingdoms: the Cholas, the Pandyas, and the Cheras.

=== Conquest of northern Sri Lanka ===
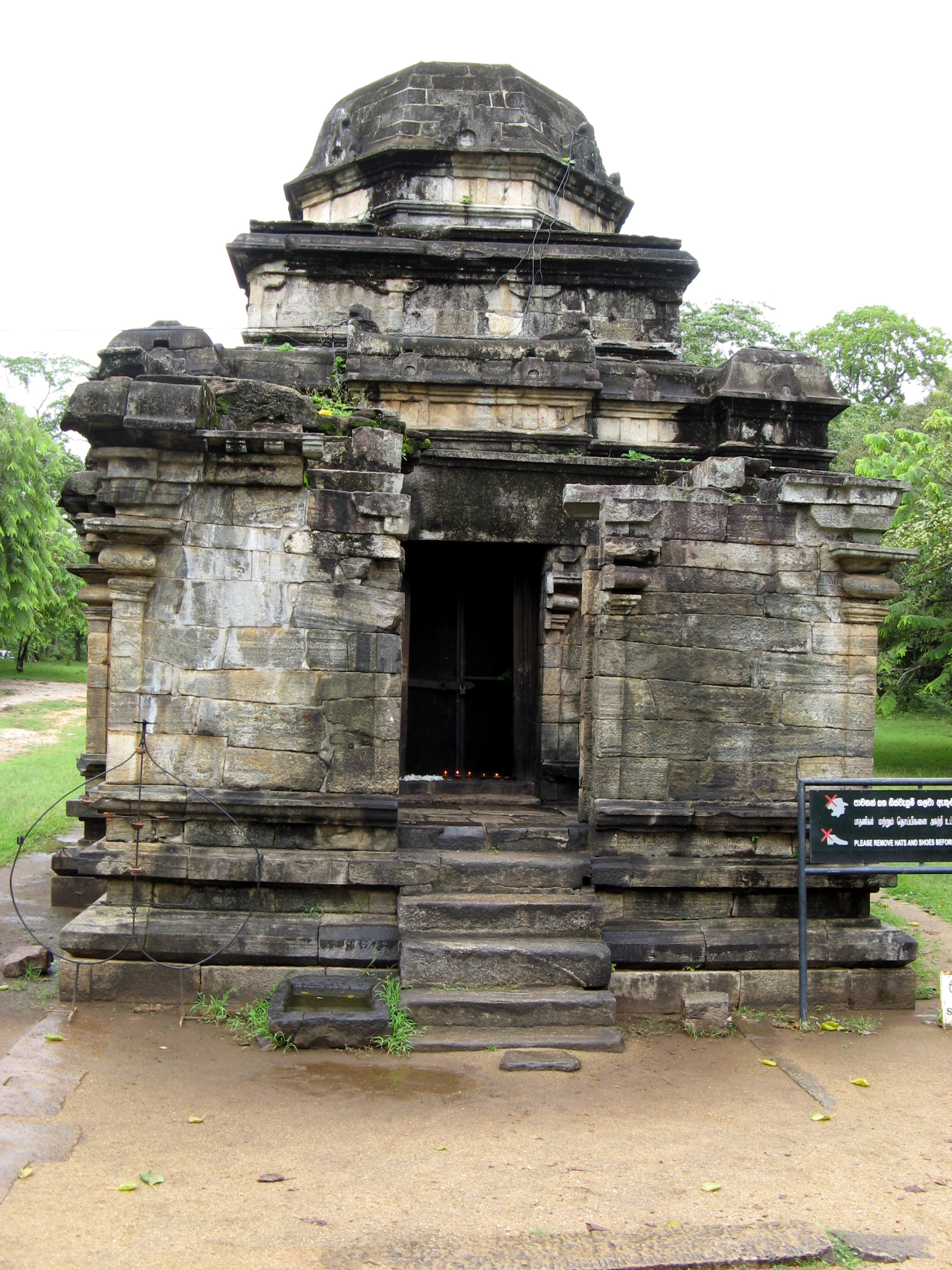
Remains of a Shiva temple, erected following Rajaraja's capture of Polonnaruwa and its renaming to Jananathamangalam, which indicate the Chola emperor's conquest in the region

During the reign of King Mahinda V, the Sinhalese kingdom of Anuradhapura experienced a significant military revolt around 982 CE, primarily as a consequence of the monarch's economic policies. The armed forces of the Anuradhapura capital predominantly consisted of Tamil mercenaries recruited from coastal regions. By 982, tensions escalated into a full-fledged uprising led by these mercenaries, resulting in a protracted civil conflict. The ensuing turmoil compelled the vulnerable Sinhala ruler to seek refuge in the Rohana principality, thereby plunging the capital city of Anuradhapura into an extended period of civil unrest lasting approximately eleven years, marked by widespread disorder and lawlessness.

The disruption of central governance exacerbated the financial strain on the kingdom, particularly in meeting the obligations to the Tamil mercenaries. Consequently, the mercenaries, feeling aggrieved and disillusioned, turned their allegiance towards the Chola empire. This strategic shift left Anuradhapura vulnerable to the incursions of the Chola forces, who exploited the internal strife to mount invasions in 993. These events, documented in historical sources, underscore the intricate interplay of economic policies, military dynamics, and regional power struggles during this period in the history of Anuradhapura.

In 993, Rajaraja achieved the conquest of Anuradhapura, known as Pihiti rata in local context, situated in Sri Lanka. This territory was subsequently designated as Ila-mandalam in Chola historical records. The military campaign led to the sacking of Anuradhapura by the Chola army, resulting in the acquisition of the northern portion of Sri Lanka by the Chola empire. As part of their administrative efforts, the Cholas established a provincial capital at the strategic military outpost of Polonnaruwa, renaming it Jananathamangalam in honour of Rajaraja's title.

Under Chola administration, the chola official and military officer Tali Kumaran oversaw the construction of a significant Shiva temple known as Rajarajeshwara, meaning "Lord of Rajaraja", within the town of Mahatirtha, now recognised as modern-day Mantota. Consequently, Mahatirtha was renamed Rajarajapura in commemoration of the Chola monarch's conquest and establishment of authority in the region.

The Thiruvalangadu Plates directly compare Rajaraja's campaign to the invasion of Lanka by the legendary hero Rama:

"Rama built with the aid of monkeys, a causeway across the sea, and then with great difficulties defeated the king of Lanka using sharp-edged arrows. But Rama was excelled by this king whose powerful army crossed the ocean by ships and burnt up the king of Lanka."

— Thiruvalangadu Copper Plates

=== Chalukyan conflict ===
In 998, Rajaraja annexed Gangapadi, Nolambapadi, and Tadigaipadi (present-day Karnataka). During this campaign, he subdued the Nolamba dynasty, who were previously vassals of the Ganga dynasty. These territories were initially under the suzerainty of the Rashtrakutas, who had been defeated by the Western Chalukyas in 973. Consequently, the Cholas found themselves in direct conflict with the Chalukyas.

=== Battle of Gangavadi ===
By 1004, Rajaraja had conquered the Gangavadi province. He established control over the western part of Gangavadi, ruled by the Changalvas, and over Kodagu, governed by the Kongalvas, who were then made vassals of the Chola Empire. In 1004 AD Raja Raja Chola encamped in Gangavadi province, and soon Chalukya army invaded. In the Battle of Gangavadi, Raja Raja Chola defeated the invading Chalukya army and secured Gangavadi Province.

=== Battle of Annigeri ===
Raja Raja Chola led the campaign in Ratta Padi in 1003–1004 AD and achieved victory in many battles. Raja Raja Chola I defeated Satyashraya in the Battle of Annigeri and successfully conquered Annigeri Province. In this battle Satyashraya was assisted by his brother Dasavarman and General Dandanayaka Kesava. Dandanayaka Kesava was governor of the Belvola-300 and Puligere-300 divisions, which are located in Annigeri Province. The Tiruvalangadu plates of Rajendra Chola state that Raja Raja defeated Satyashraya who "fled to avoid misery from the attack of his (i.e., Arulmolivarman's) ocean-like army; (still) misery found a (permanent) abode in him. In this battle Satyashraya's brother, Prince Dasavarman, was killed, and Chalukya general Dandanayaka Kesava was taken prisoner. After Raja Raja Chola returned to his capital with booty of some gold flowers and treasures, which he dedicated to the temple of Thanjavur.

=== Siege of Unkal ===
Raja Raja Chola diverted attention from Vengi affairs to the Satyashraya to counteroffensive and sent an army under Crown Prince Rajendra Chola in Chalukya Country. Rajendra marched with a 900,000-strong army and Captured Santalige, Kadambalige, Banavasi, Kogali and besieged the fort of Unkallu in the modern Unkal district located in the Dharwad district. In this ensuing battle, the Cholas defeated the Chalukyas, and the Chalukya commander, Lenka Keta, was killed. After Rajendra Chola successfully captured Unkallu Fort and then encamped at Donur.

=== Battle of Donur ===
Following the Siege of Unkallu Fort, Rajendra battled against Satyashraya, who was opposing him in Donur. In the Battle of Donur, Rajendra chola defeated Satyashraya and successfully raided Banavasi, Donur (in the Bijapur region), Unkal (near modern Hubli), Kudala Sangama and parts of the Raichur Doab and secured Gangavadi and Nolambavadi. But this conquest and all raids in Chalukya country only lasted until Satyashraya reconquered all territories up to Thungapathra but Satrashraya couldn't reconquer south of Thungapathra territories in Karnataka as they remained under Chola rule.

An inscription attributed to Irivabedanga Satyashraya from Dharwar acknowledges his allegiance to the Western Chalukyas and highlights the Chola incursion. He accuses Rajendra Chola of leading a massive force of 955,000 soldiers and causing havoc in Donuwara(Donur in Bijapur district), blurring the ethical boundaries of warfare prescribed by the Dharmaśāstras. Historians such as James Heitzman and Wolfgang Schenkluhn interpret this confrontation as indicative of personal animosity between the rulers of the Chola and Western Chalukya kingdoms, akin to historical conflicts between the Chalukyas of Badami and the Pallavas of Kanchi.

=== Vengi kingdom ===
Meanwhile, the Vengi kingdom was under the rule of Jata Choda Bhima, a member of the Telugu Cholas branch. However, Rajaraja emerged victorious in battle against Bhima, and Saktivarman, an Eastern Chalukya prince, was appointed as a viceroy under the Chola Dynasty. Despite a brief period of Bhima's recapture of Kanchi in 1001, Rajaraja swiftly restored Saktivarman to power. Notably, Rajaraja cemented an alliance between the Chola Dynasty and the Eastern Chalukya kingdom by arranging the marriage of his daughter, Kundavai, to the next viceroy of Vengi, Vimaladitya. This strategic union ensured the future succession of Rajaraja's descendants to the throne of the eastern Chalukya kingdom.Satyashraya retaliated by invading the Vengi country in 1006 A.D. and placed Saktivaiman on the Vengi Throne. Raja Raja Chola diverted the Chalukyas to send a big army under Prince Rajendra Chola in Chalukya country. So Satyashraya, without having reinforcement to deal with the Chola army, called back his general Bayal Nambi, who advanced up to Chebrollu. Satyastraya did not permanently recapture Vengi. He made attempts, but the Cholas successfully defended their influence.

=== Victory over Hoysalas ===
Narasipur, dated to 1006, records that Rajaraja's general Aprameya killed Hoysala generals and a minister identified as Naganna. Additionally, a similar inscription in Channapatna describes Rajaraja defeating the Hoysalas.General Aprameya defeated Hoysala leaders manjaga, kaliga(or kali – ganga), Nigavarma and others in the Battle of Kalavur .winning by his valour in the plain of Kalavur a name to endure for ever.

=== Kalinga conquest ===
The invasion of the kingdom of Kalinga occurred after the conquest of Vengi. This conquest marked the northern boundary of the Chola Empire at that time and established their control over the entirety of south and south-east India.

=== Conquest of Kuda-malai-nadu ===
In multiple historical accounts, there are mentions of Rajaraja's conquest of a place called "Kuda-malai-nadu" around the year 1000. In certain inscriptions found in Karnataka, the term "Kudagu-malai-nadu" is used instead of "Kuda-malai-nadu". Scholars generally believe that this region corresponds to Coorg (Kudagu).

The king's conquest of Malainadu is described in the Vikrama Chola Ula, where it is said that he achieved it in just one day, crossing 18 mountain passes. According to the Kulottunga Chola Ula, Rajaraja was depicted as beheading 18 people and burning down Udagai. Additionally, the Kalingathupparani references the establishment of Chadaya Nalvizha in Udiyar Mandalam, the seizure of Udagai, and the plundering of several elephants from the area. The Tiruppalanam inscription from 999 records the king's offering of an idol obtained as spoils from Malainadu.

=== Naval expedition and Conquest of the Maldives ===
The naval campaigns of Rajaraja formed a reassertion of Chola power in the Indian Ocean.

"A naval campaign led to the conquest of the Maldive Islands, the Malabar Coast, and northern Sri Lanka, all of which were essential to the Chola control over trade with Southeast Asia and with Arabia and eastern Africa. These were the transit areas, ports of call for the Arab traders and ships to Southeast Asia and China, which were the source of the valuable spices sold at a high profit to Europe."

— Romila Thapar, "Encyclopaedia Britannica".

The Cholas controlled the area around Bay of Bengal with Nagapattinam as the main port. The Chola Navy also played a major role in the invasion of Sri Lanka. The success of Rajaraja allowed his son Rajendra Chola to lead the Chola invasion of Srivijaya, carrying out naval raids in South-East Asia and briefly occupying Kadaram.

Rajaraja I and Rajendra I are described as the greatest Chola rulers because of these conquests.

== Personal life ==
Rajaraja married several women, including the following: Vanathi aka Thiripuvāna Mādēviyār, Dantisakti Vitanki aka Lokamadevi, Panchavan Madeviyar, Chola Mahadevi, Trailokya Mahadevi, Lata Mahadevi, Prithvi Mahadevi, Meenavan Mahadevi, Viranarayani and Villavan Mahadevi. He had at least three daughters and two sons. The older son, Rajendra, was born to Thiripuvāna Mādēviyār. The younger son was named Araiyan Rajarajan, and the identity of his mother is unknown. He had his first daughter Kundavai with Lokamadevi who eventually married Chalukya prince Vimaladithan. Rajaraja had two other daughters. Rajaraja died in 1014 in the Tamil month of Maka and was succeeded by Rajendra Chola I.

== Administration ==
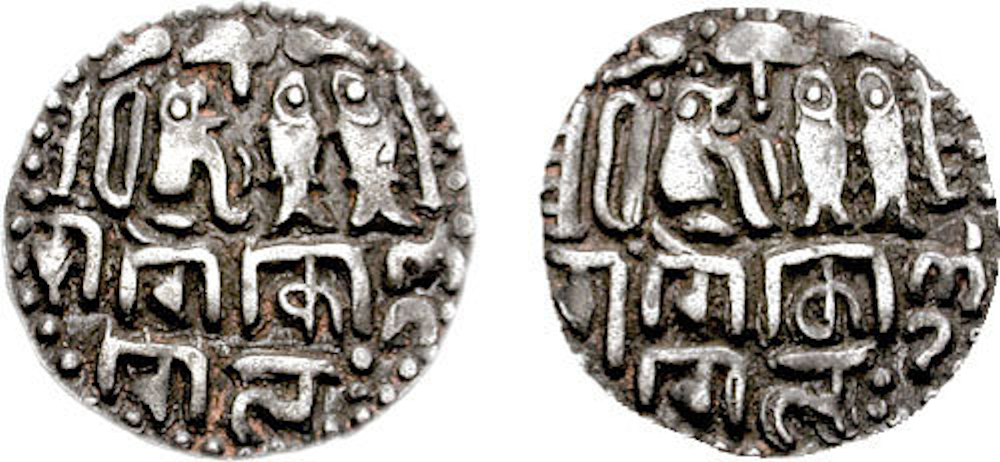
Imperial coin of Chola King Rajaraja I (985–1014). Uncertain Tamilnadu mint. Legend "Chola, conqueror of the Gangas" in Tamil, seated tiger with two fish.

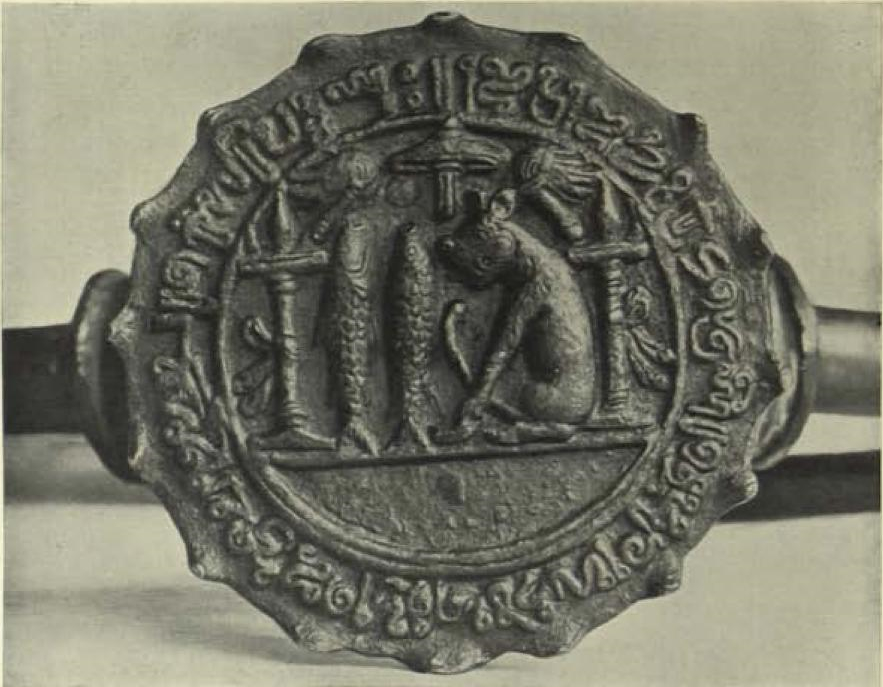
Imperial seal of Rajaraja I

Before the reign of Rajaraja I, portions of the Chola territory were ruled by hereditary lords and princes who were in a loose alliance with the Chola rulers. Rajaraja initiated a project of land survey and assessment in 1000 which led to the reorganisation of the empire into units known as valanadus. From the reign of Rajaraja I until the reign of Vikrama Chola in 1133, the hereditary lords and local princes were either replaced or turned into dependent officials. This led to the king exercising closer control over the different parts of the empire. Rajaraja strengthened the local self-governments and installed a system of audit and control by which the village assemblies and other public bodies were held to account while retaining their autonomy. To promote trade, he sent the first Chola mission to China. Furthermore, his elder sister Kundavai assisted him in the administration and management of temples.

== Officials ==
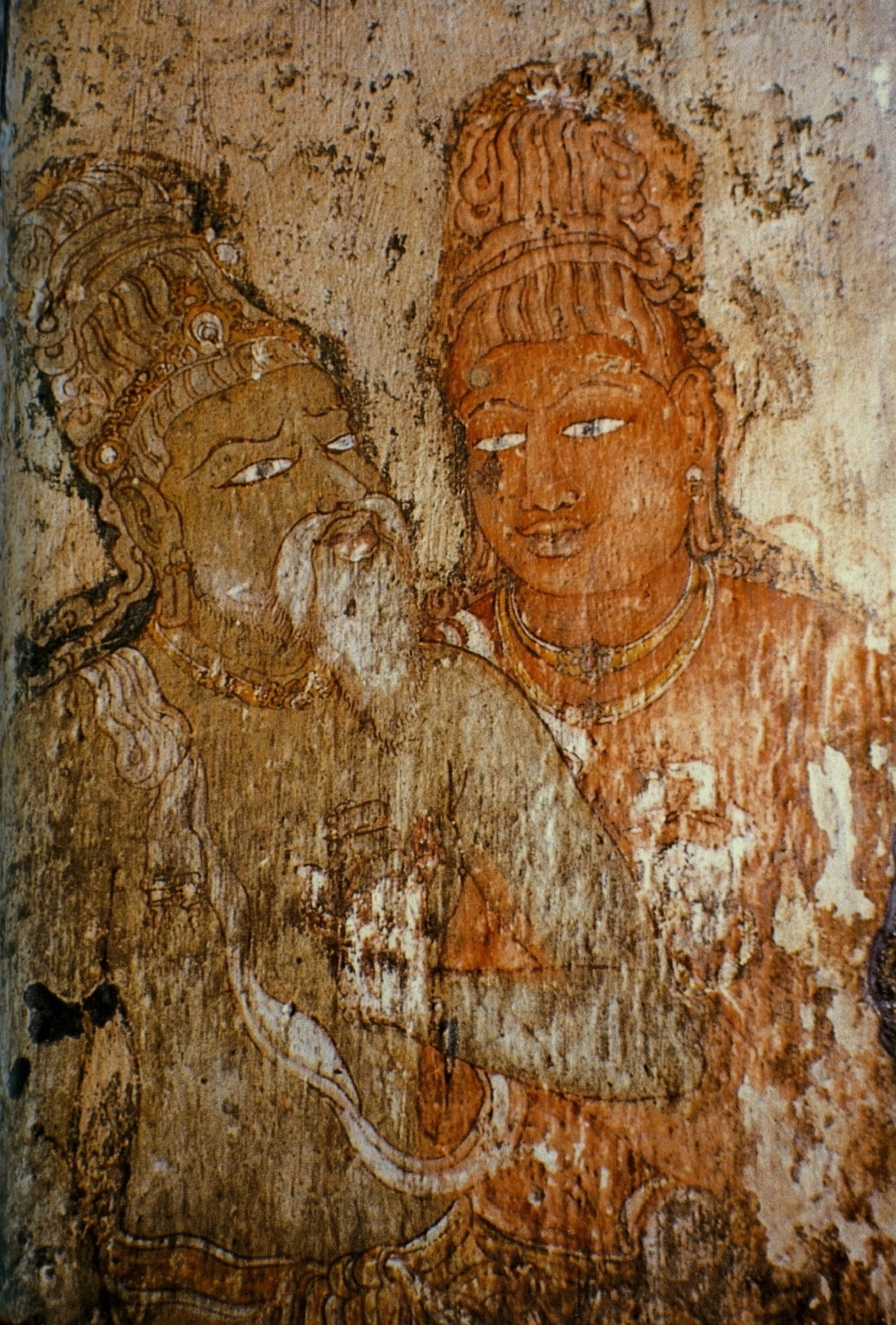
Mural depicting Rajaraja and his guru Karuvuruvar found in the Brihadisvara temple, Tamil Nadu (11th century)

Towards the end of his reign, Rajaraja appointed Rajendra Chola I as co-regent, who served as the supreme commander of the northern and northwestern territories. Under his rule, the administrative system was expanded, resulting in a greater number of offices and officials documented in Chola records compared to previous eras. Villavan Muvendavelan, one of Rajaraja's top officials, figures in many of his inscriptions. Other officials named in inscriptions include the Bana prince Narasimhavarman, the general Senapathi Krishnan Raman, the Samanta chief Vallavaraiyan Vandiyadevan, the revenue official Irayiravan Pallavarayan, and Kuruvan Ulagalandan, who organised the country-wide land surveys.

== Religious policy ==
Rajaraja was a follower of the Shaivite denomination of Hinduism, but he also dedicated several temples to Vishnu. Rajaraja called himself Shivapada Shekhara (IAST: Śivapāda Śekhara), literally, 'the one who places his crown at the feet of Shiva'.

The Buddhist monastery of Chudamani Vihara was constructed in the 11th century in Nagapattinam by the Sailendra king of Srivijaya, Sri Mara Vijayattungavarman, with the support of Rajaraja I. It was named Chudamani (or Chulamani) Vihara after King Sri Mara's father. According to the small Leyden grant, this Vihara was known as Rajaraja-perumpalli during the reign of Kulottunga I.

== Arts and architecture ==
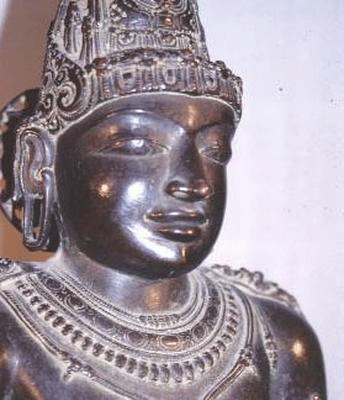
Bronze portrait of Raraja Cholan, 11th century.

After hearing short excerpts of the Tevaram in his court, Rajaraja embarked on a mission to recover the hymns. He sought the help of Nambiyandar Nambi. It is believed that by divine intervention Nambi found the presence of scripts, in the form of cadijam leaves half-eaten by white ants in a chamber inside the second precinct in Thillai Nataraja Temple, Chidambaram. The brahmanas (Dikshitars) in the temple opposed the mission, but Rajaraja intervened by consecrating the images of the saint-poets through the streets of Chidambaram. Rajaraja thus became known as 'Tirumurai Kanda Cholan', meaning 'One who saved the Tirumurai'. In his work Nambiyandar Nambi Puranam (alias Tirumurai Kanda Puranam), Nambi identifies his patron as "Rasarasamannan-Abhayakula-sekharan" (lit. 'King Rajaraja, the best of the race of Abhaya'). At that time, Shiva temples only had images of god forms, but after the advent of Rajaraja, the images of the Nayanar saints were also placed inside the temple. Nambi organised the hymns of three saint poets—Sambandar, Appar, and Sundarar—as the first seven books. He included Manickavasagar's "Tirukovayar" and "Tiruvacakam" as the 8th book, and the hymns of nine other saints as the 9th book. The "Tirumandiram" of Tirumular was designated as the 10th book, while 40 hymns by 12 other poets constituted the 11th book. Additionally, Nambi added Tirutotanar Tiruvanthathi, the sacred anthathi of the labours of the 63 Nayanar saints, along with his own hymns as the 12th book. The initial seven books were later recognised as the Tevaram. With the addition of Sekkizhar's Periya Puranam (1135) as the twelfth book, the entire Saiva canon became known as Tirumurai, the holy scripture. Consequently, Saiva literature now encompasses approximately 600 years of religious, philosophical, and literary development.

There are no existing contemporary portraits or statues of Rajaraja. The bronze figure purportedly depicting him at the Thanjavur temple is spurious and of recent origin.

=== Brihadisvara Temple ===
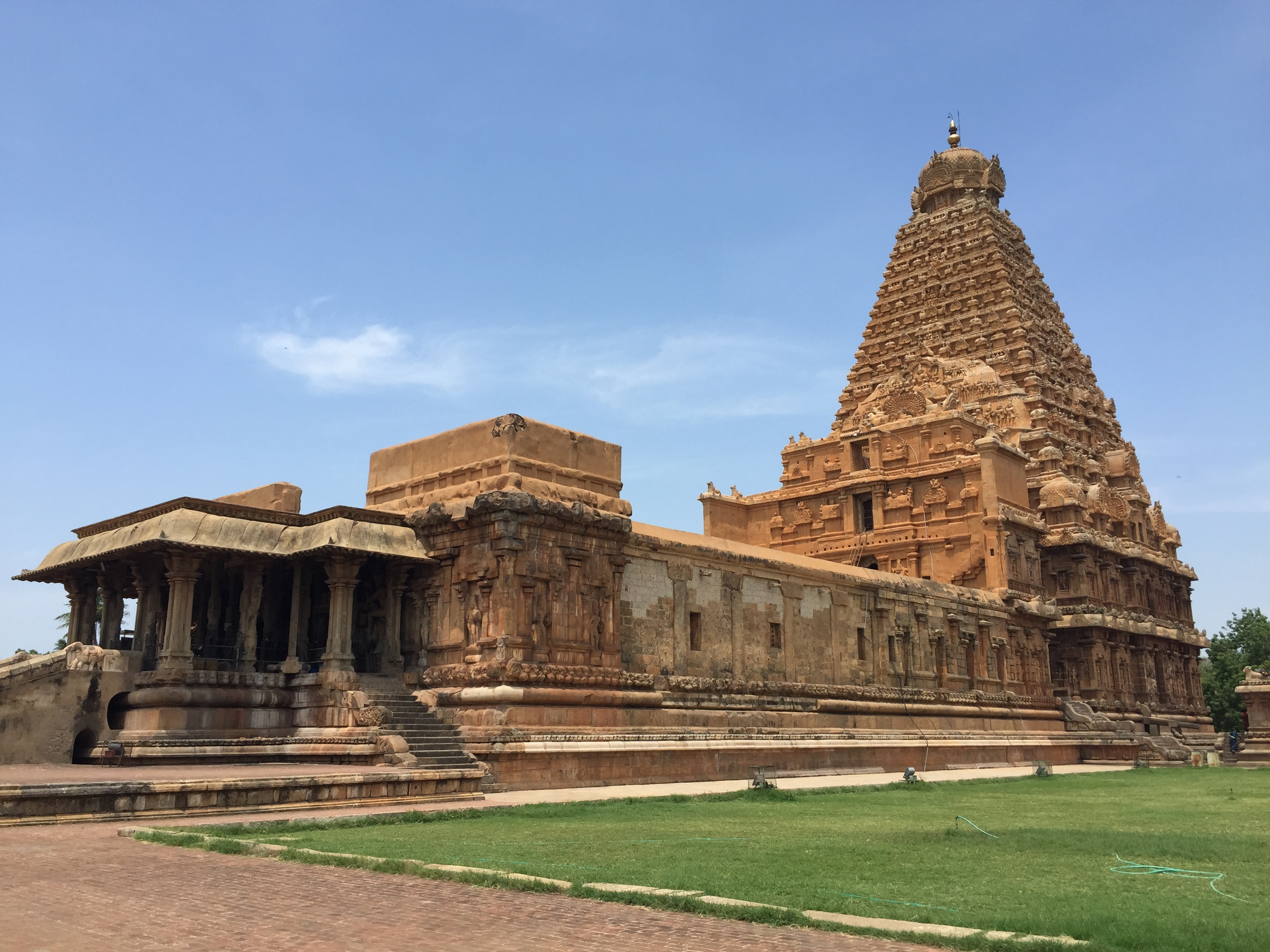
Brihadisvara Temple built by Rajaraja I, a UNESCO World Heritage Site

During 1010, Rajaraja built the Peruvudaiyar Temple (also known as Periya Kovil, RajaRajeswara Temple, and Rajarajeswaram) in Thanjavur and dedicated it to Shiva. The temple and the capital were centres of both religious and economic activity. The temple is one of the largest temples in India and is an example of Dravidian architecture of the Chola period. Along with Gangaikonda Cholapuram temple and Airavatesvara temple, Peruvudaiyar temple is part of the UNESCO World Heritage Site known as the "Great Living Chola Temples".

== Coins ==
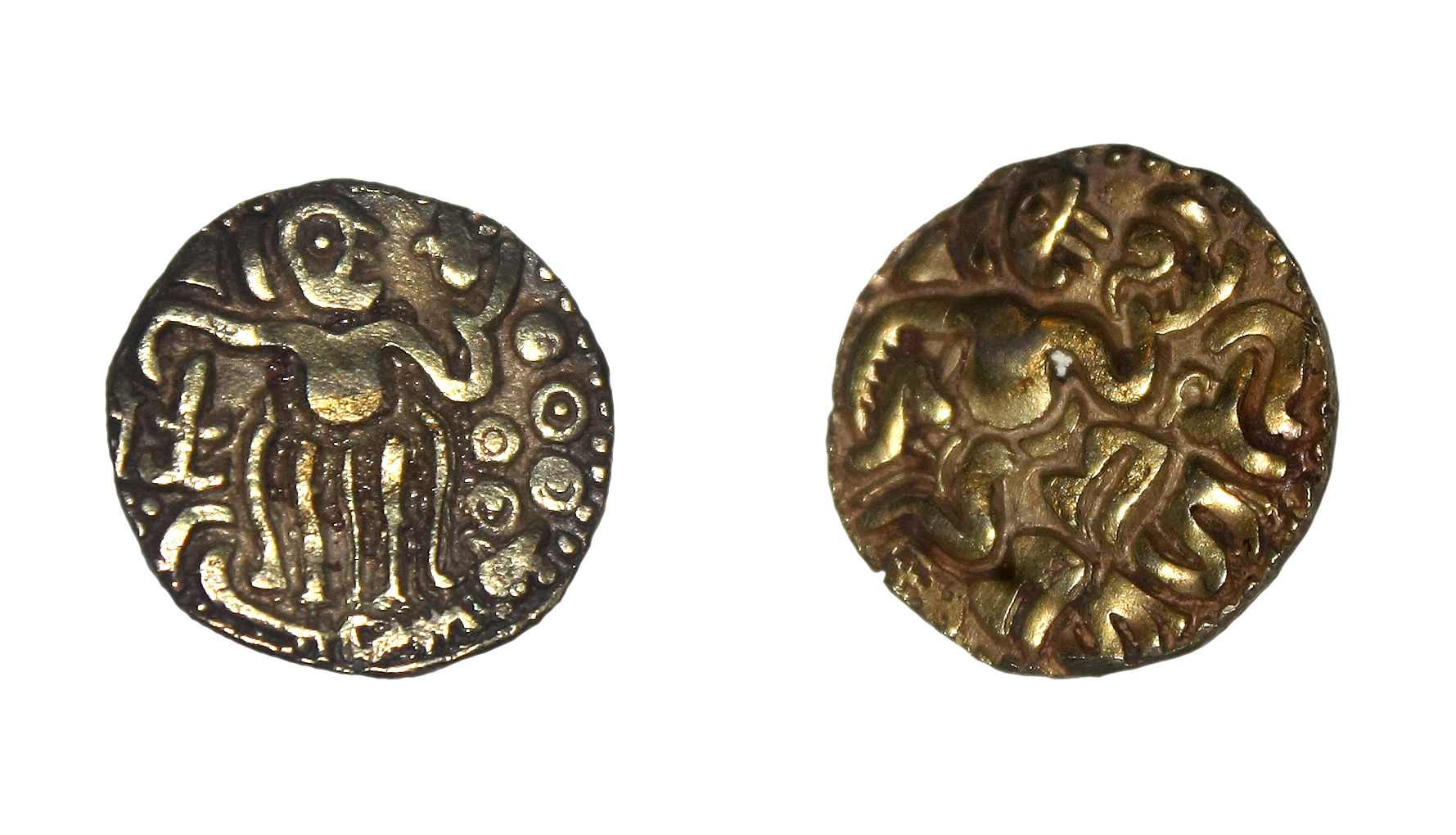
Copper coin of Rajaraja I

Prior to Rajaraja's reign, Chola coins featured the tiger emblem on the obverse, along with the fish and bow emblems representing the Pandya and Chera Dynasties, while the reverse side displayed the name of the King. However, a new type of coin emerged during Rajaraja's rule. These new coins showcased the figure of the standing king on the obverse side, while the reverse side depicted a seated goddess. The coins spread across much of southern India and were copied by Sri Lankan kings.

== Inscriptions ==
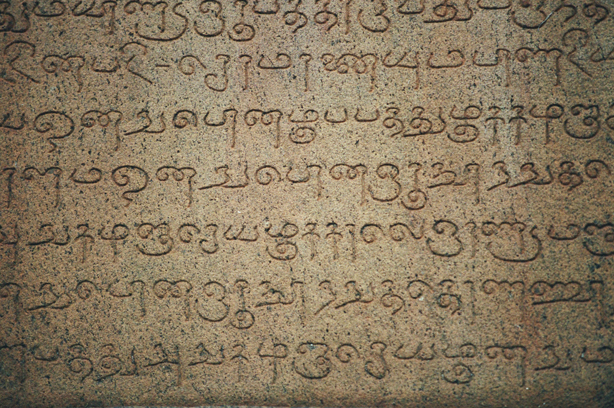
A typical lithic inscription of the Chola period

Due to Rajaraja's desire to record his military achievements, he recorded the important events of his life in stone. An inscription in Tamil from Mulbagal in Karnataka shows his accomplishments as early as the 19th year. An excerpt from such a Meikeerthi, an inscription recording great accomplishments, follows:

Hail Prosperity! In the 21st year of (the reign of) the illustrious Ko Raja Rajakesari Varma, alias the illustrious Rajaraja Deva, who, while both the goddess of fortune and the great goddess of the earth, who had become his exclusive property, gave him pleasure, was pleased to destroy the kalam at Kandalur and conquered by his army, which was victorious in great battles, Vengai-nadu, Ganga-padi, Nulamba-padi, Tadigai-padi, Kudamalai-nadu, Kollam, Kalingam and Ira-mandalam, which is famed in the eight directions; who, while his beauty was increasing, and while he was resplendent (to such an extent) that he was always worthy to be worshipped, deprived the Seriyas of their splendour, and (in words) in the twenty-first year of Chola Arumoli, who possesses the river Ponni, whose waters are full of waves.

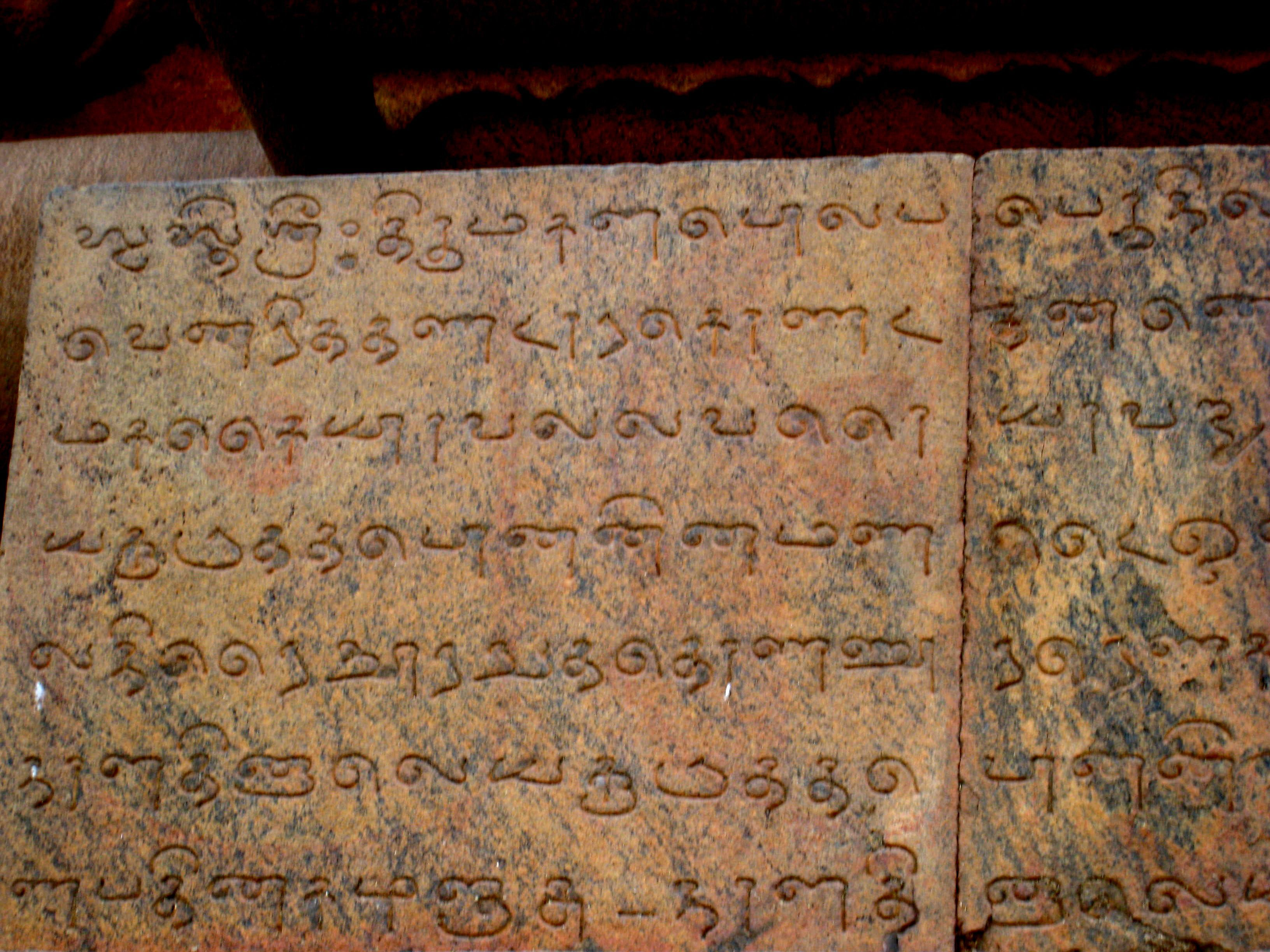
ஸ்வஸ்திஸ்ரீ் திருமகள் போல பெருநில

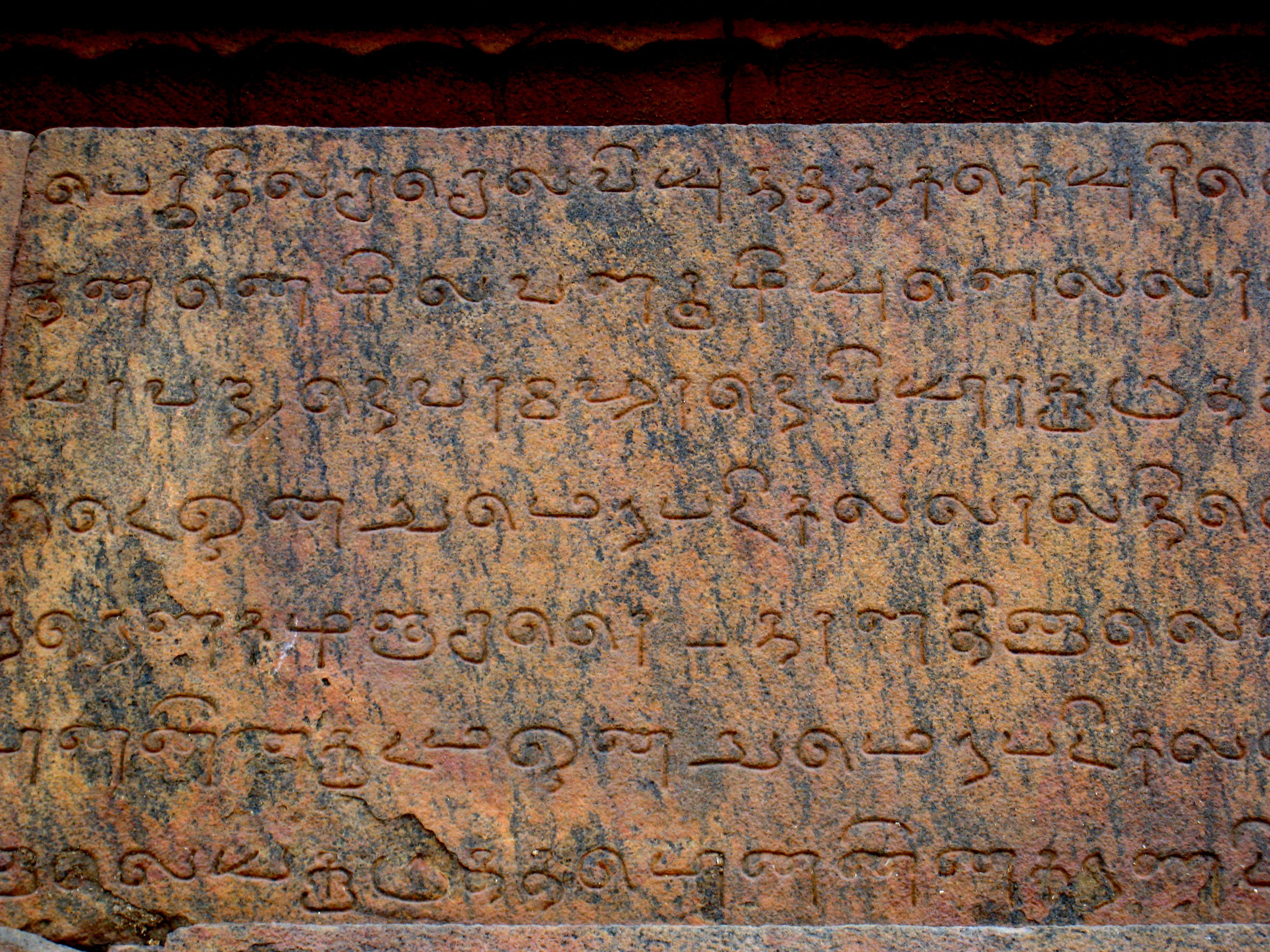
பெருநிலச் செல்வியுந் தனக்கேயுரிமை

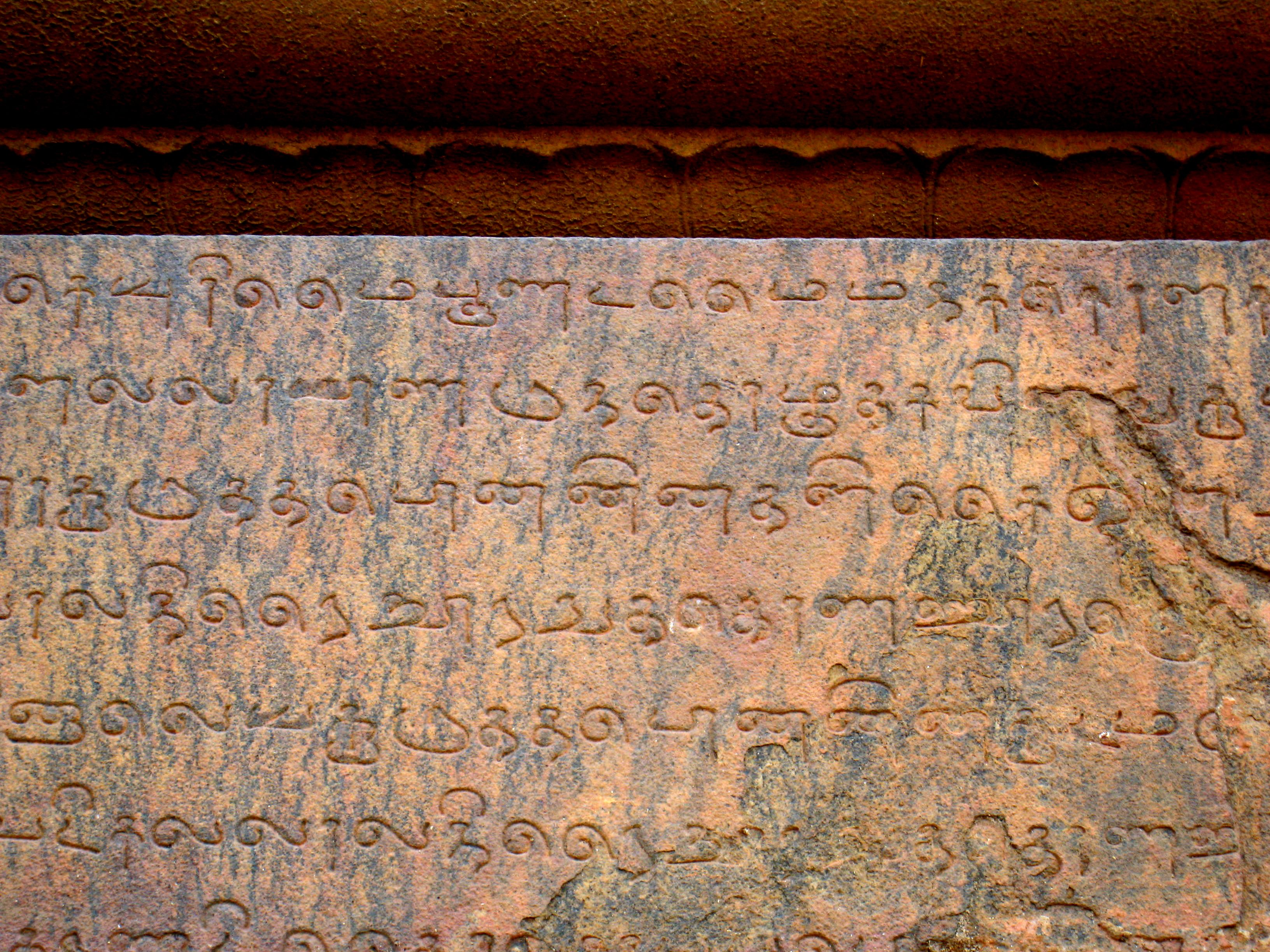
கேயுரிமை பூண்டமை மனக்கொளக்

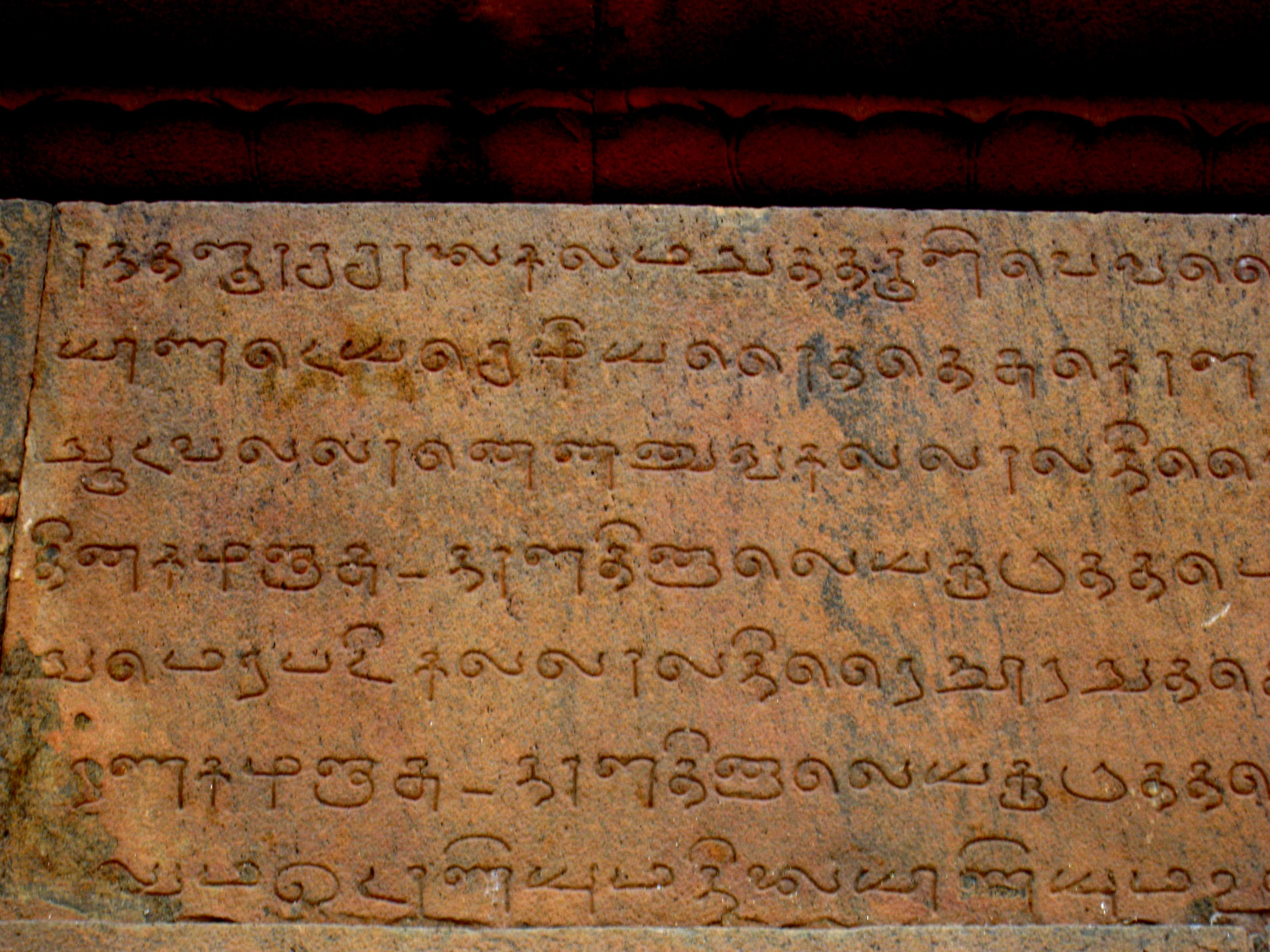
காந்தளூர்ச் சாலைக் களமறூத்தருளி வேங்கை

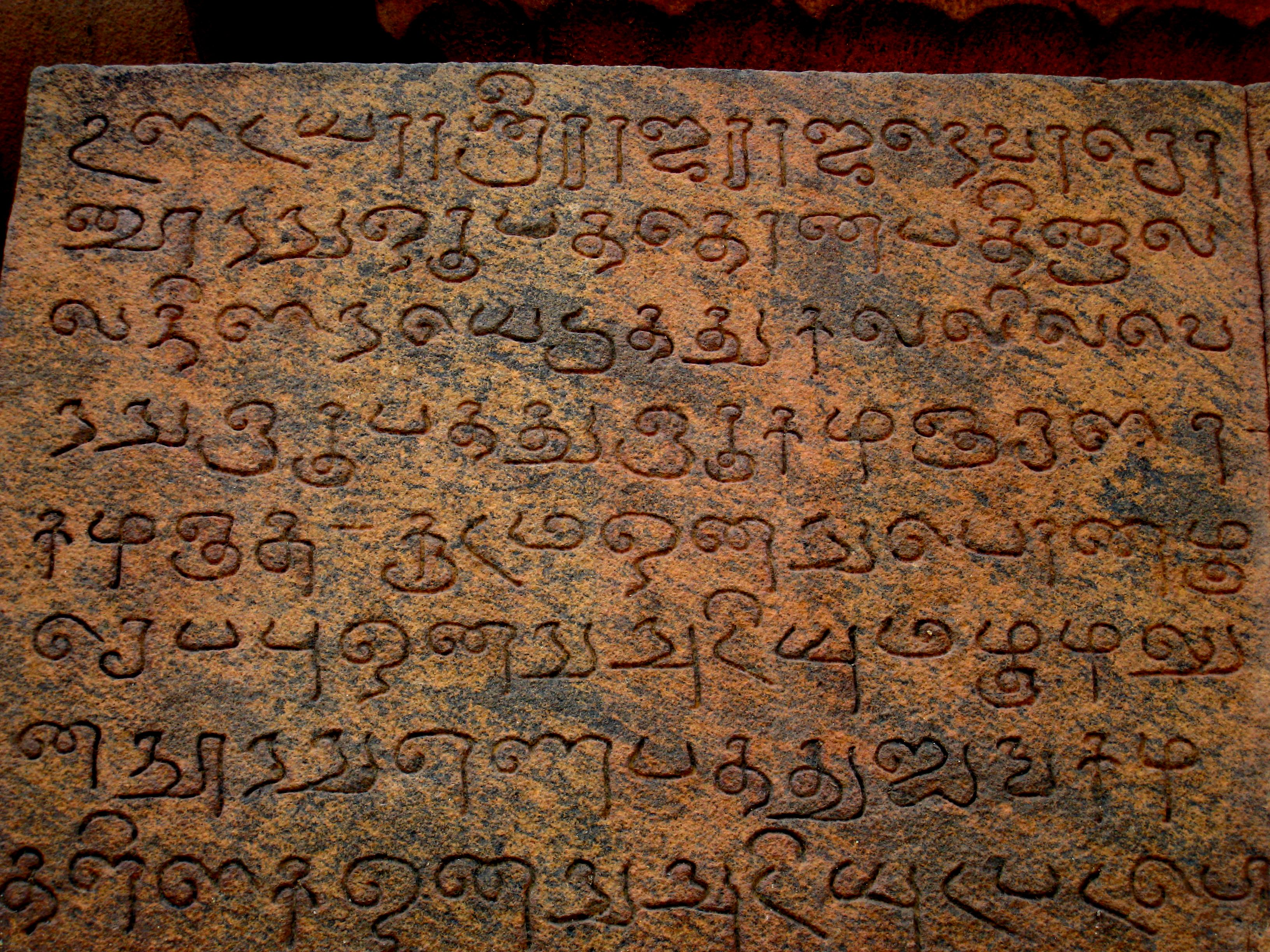
உடையார் ஸ்ரீராஜராஜ

Excerpts of Rajaraja's inscription from Brihadisvara Temple in Thanjavur (first line in every image)

Rajaraja recorded all the grants made to the Thanjavur temple and his achievements. He also preserved the records of his predecessors. An inscription of his reign found at Tirumalavadi records an order of the king to the effect that the central shrine of the Vaidyanatha temple at the place should be rebuilt and that, before pulling down the walls, the inscriptions engraved on them should be copied in a book. The records were subsequently re-engraved on the walls from the book after the rebuilding was finished.

== In popular culture ==
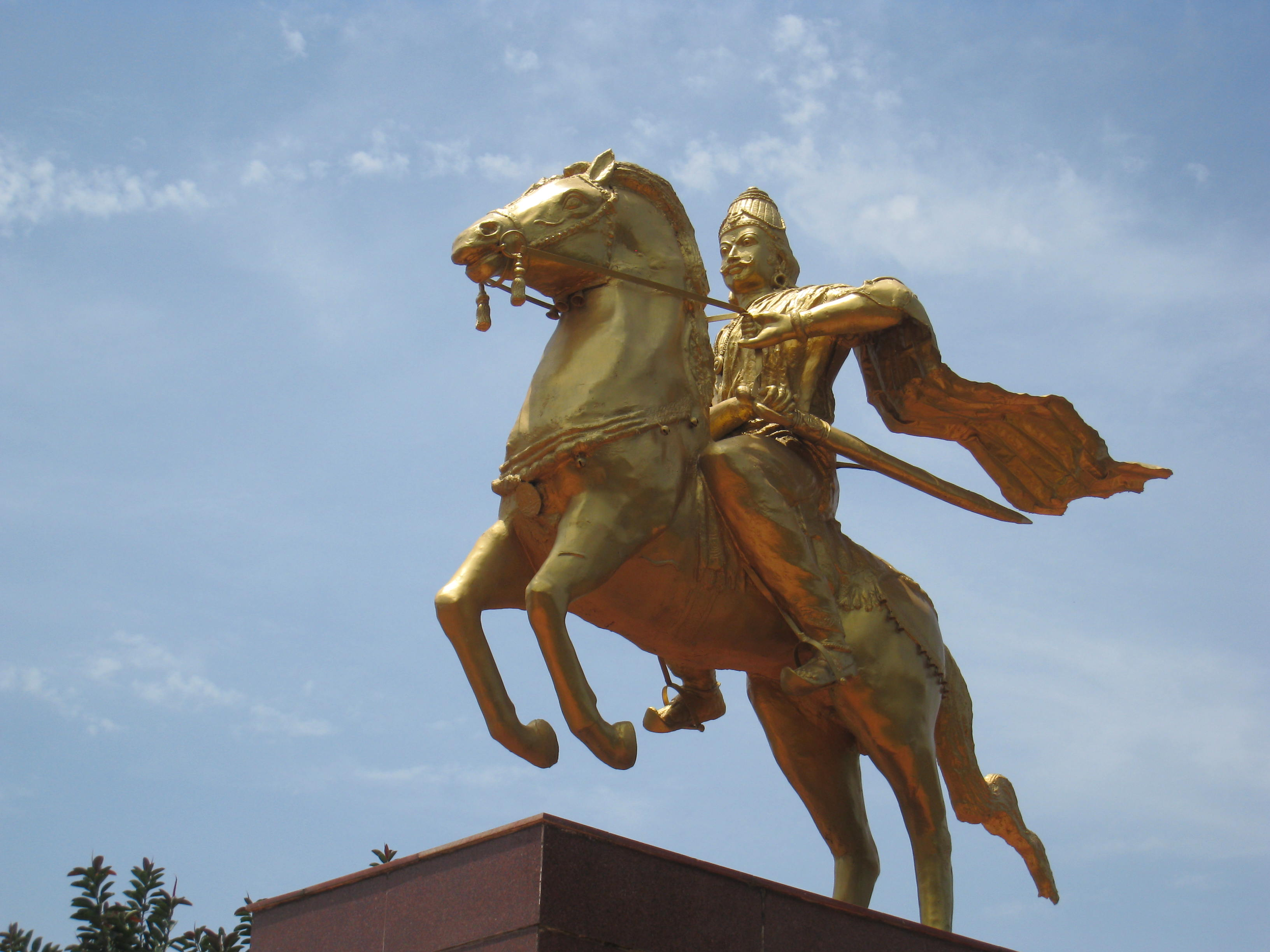
20th-century sculpture of Rajaraja in Thanjavur

- Ponniyin Selvan: I – a 2022 film based on Kalki Krishnamurthy's 1955 novel Ponniyin Selvan, which deals with the succession troubles during the reign of Sundara Chola and the death of the elder prince, Aditha Karikalan, portrayed by Tamil actor Vikram. The role of the younger prince, Arulmozhi Varman, also known as Ponniyin Selvan and the future Rajaraja I, was played by Tamil actor Ravi Mohan. The sequel, Ponniyin Selvan: II, was released in 2023.
- Rajaraja Cholan – a 1973 Tamil film starring Sivaji Ganesan.
- Ponniyin Selvan – a novel by Kalki, which revolves around the early life of Rajaraja, the mysteries surrounding the death of Aditha Karikalan, and the subsequent accession of Uththama Chola to the Chola throne.
- Nandipurathu Nayagi by Vembu Vikiraman revolves around the ascension of Uttama Chola to the throne and Rajaraja's naval expedition.
- Rajaraja Cholan by Kathal Ramanathan.
- Kandalur Vasantha Kumaran Kathai by Sujatha, which deals with the situations leading Rajaraja to invade Kandalur.
- Rajakesari and Cherar Kottai by Gokul Seshadri deal with the Kandalur invasion and its after-effects.
- Bharat Ek Khoj – a 1988 historical drama that depicts Rajaraja Chola (played by Om Puri) in episodes 22 and 23.
- Kaviri Mainthan – a 2007 novel by Anusha Venkatesh.
- Udayaar – a book by Tamil author Balakumaran, which deals with Rajaraja's later years and Rajendra Chola I's ascension.

== See also ==
- List of Tamil monarchs
- Chola Military
- Chola Navy

== Bibliography ==
- A. K. Seshadri (1998). Sri Brihadisvara: The Great Temple of Thānjavūr. Nile.
- B. Lewis Rice (1905). Epigraphia Carnatica. Vol. 10, Part I. Mysore Archaeological Survey.
- Eugen Hultzsch (1890). South Indian inscriptions (1983 reprint). Archaeological Survey of India.
- Gunawardena, Charles A. (2005). Encyclopedia of Sri Lanka. Sterling Publishers Pvt. Ltd. ISBN 978-1-932705-48-5.
- Geeta Vasudevan (2003). Royal Temple of Rajaraja: An Instrument of Imperial Chola Power. Abhinav Publications. ISBN 0-00-638784-5.
- John E. Cort (1998). Open boundaries: Jain communities and culture in Indian history. Albany: State University of New York Press. ISBN 978-0-7914-3786-5.
- John Keay (2000). India, a History. London: Harper Collins Publishers. ISBN 0-00-638784-5.
- K. A. N. Sastri (1984) [1935]. The Cholas. Madras: University of Madras.
- K. A. N. Sastri (1992). "The Cōḷas". In R. S. Sharma; K. M. Shrimali (eds.). A Comprehensive history of India: A.D. 985–1206. People's Publishing House. ISBN 978-81-7007-121-1.
- K. A. N. Sastri (2000) [1955]. A History of South India. New Delhi: Oxford University Press. ISBN 0-19-560686-8.
- Kamil Zvelebil (1974). A History of Indian literature. Vol. 10 (Tamil Literature). Otto Harrasowitz. ISBN 3-447-01582-9.
- Milo Kearney (2003). The Indian Ocean in World History. Routledge. ISBN 0-415-31277-9.
- Kulke, Hermann; Kesavapany, K.; Sakhuja, Vijay (2009). Nagapattinam to Suvarnadwip: Reflections on the Chola Naval Expeditions to Southeast Asia. Singapore: Institute of south-east Asian Studies. ISBN 978-981-230-938-9.
- M. G. S. Narayanan (2013) [1972]. Perumals of Kerala: Brahmin Oligarchy and Ritual Monarchy. Kerala: CosmoBooks. ISBN 978-81-88765-07-2.
- Norman Cutler (1987). Songs of experience: the poetics of Tamil devotion. USA: Library of Congress Cataloging-in-Publication-Data. ISBN 0-253-35334-3.
- R. Rajalakshmi (1983). Tamil Polity, c. A.D. 600-c. A.D. 1300. Ennes.
- R. Nagaswamy (2010). Brhadisvara Temple: Form and Meaning. Aryan Books International. ASIN 817305388X.
- R. S. Sharma (2003). Early Medieval Indian Society. Orient Blackswan. ISBN 978-81-250-2523-8.
- S.R. Balasubrahmanyam (1977). Middle Chola Temples: Rajaraja I to Kulottunga I. Oriental. ISBN 9789060236079.
- Spencer, George W. (May 1976). "The Politics of Plunder: The Cholas in Eleventh-Century Ceylon". The Journal of Asian Studies. 35 (3): 405–419. doi:10.2307/2053272. JSTOR 2053272. S2CID 154741845.
- T. S. Subramanian (27 November 2009). "Unearthed stone ends debate". The Hindu. Archived from the original on 24 June 2018.
- V. Ramamurthy (1986). N. Mahalingam (ed.). History of Kongu. International Society for the Investigation of Ancient Civilization.
- Vidya Dehejia (2009). The Body Adorned: Sacred and Profane in Indian Art. Columbia University Press. p. 42. ISBN 978-0-231-51266-4.
- Vidya Dehejia (1990). Art of the Imperial Cholas. Columbia University Press. ISBN 978-0-231-51524-5.
- T. S, Sridhar (2011). Thiruvindalur Copper Plate [திருவிந்தளூர்ச்‌ செப்பேடு] (in English and Tamil) (First ed.). Chennai: Tamil Nadu State Department of Archaeology. pp. 20, 21.

Preceded by Uttama Chola	Rajaraja I 985–1014	Succeeded by Rajendra Chola I
