= Chola Navy =

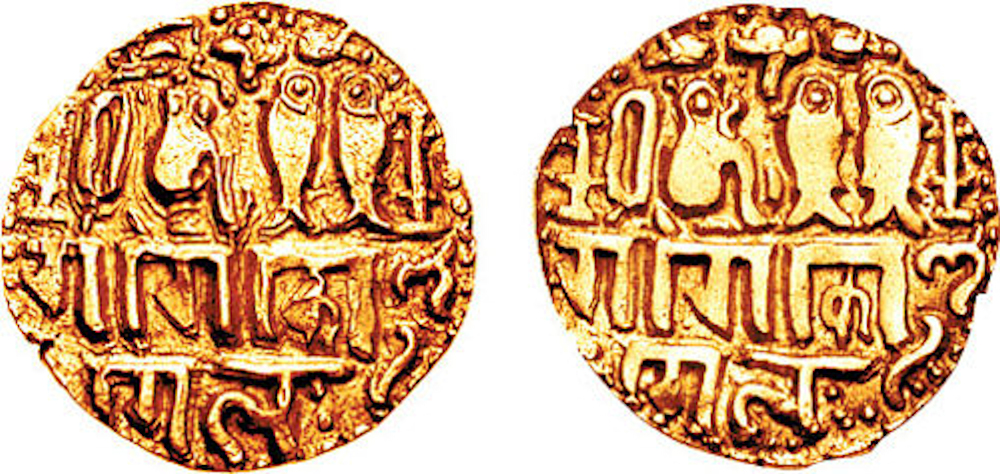
- Founded: c. 4th century BCE
- Disbanded: 1279
- Country: Chola Empire
- Allegiance: Chola Dynasty
- Type: Naval Force
- Part of: Chola military

Commanders
- Ceremonial chief: Chola Emperor – notably, Rajaraja I and Rajendra I

The Chola Navy was composed of ships used for transporting the land army overseas. The Cholas did not have a standing navy in the modern sense. The maritime force of Cholas was formed by using ships used for trade, as they did not have a dedicated ship for naval combat. Early maritime activity of the Cholas is associated with Elara (2nd century BCE), whose rule in Sri Lanka implies organized sea transport across the Palk Strait. Later, Karikala Chola is linked with the development of the port of Kaveripattinam (Puhar), reflecting structured maritime trade. Scholars note that these activities indicate naval capability, though not a permanent standing navy in the modern sense.

== Early evidence ==
Karikala chola's Naval Power described in Purananuru - 66 by Venni Kuyathiyar:

"O heir of a mighty man who mastered the movement of the wind and had his ships sail on the huge, full ocean"

— Purananuru -66

Early evidence of Chola maritime activity is associated with Ellalan, who ruled parts of Sri Lanka in the mid-second century BCE, indicating cross-strait naval movement. Historians such as Romila Thapar and R. S. Sharma note that such expeditions required organized maritime transport. Maritime development is further linked to Karikala Chola (late 1st–early 2nd century CE), who is associated with the port city of Kaveripattinam (Puhar). His reign reflects expanding overseas trade and sustained contact with Sri Lanka. Scholars, however, distinguish this early naval activity from a permanent standing navy in the modern sense.

Karikala had a powerful navy which he used to captured Sri Lanka and having established his rule and reputation. Rajavaliya Account mentioned karikala Chola invade Sri Lanka and defeated Vankanasika Tissa and captured 12,000 sinhalese Prisoners to work as slaves to build the Kaveri Dam.Kallanai is a massive dam of unhewn stone, 329 metres (1,080 ft) long and 20 metres (60 ft) wide, across the main stream of the Kaveri.

The Cholas were at the height of their power from the latter half of the 9th century CE through the early 13th century CE. Between 1010 and 1153 CE, Rajaraja's successors continued the expansion, making the Chola Empire a military, economic and cultural power in South and South-East Asia. During this period, the Chola Navy helped expand the empire with Naval expeditions to the Pala of Pataliputra, along the Ganges and the Chola invasion of Srivijaya (present-day Indonesia) in 1025 CE, as well as repeated embassies to China. The Chola Navy declined in the 13th century when the Cholas fought land battles with the Chalukyas of Andhra-Kannada area in South India, and with the rise of the Pandyan dynasty.

== History ==
=== Imperial Chola period (848–1070 CE) ===
==== Rajaraja I and Rajendra I ====
Chola territorial extent
c.1030 CE (under Rajendra I)

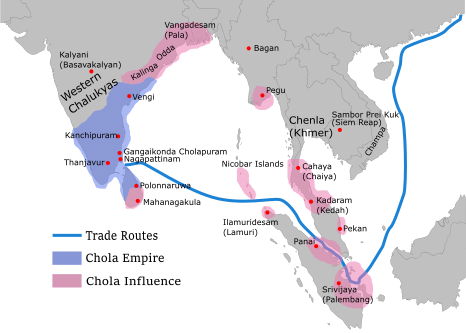
c.1055 CE (under Rajendra II)

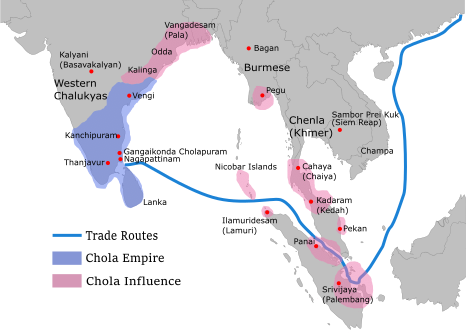
c.1065 CE (under Virarajendra Chola)

Under Rajaraja Chola I and his son Rajendra Chola I, the dynasty became a military, economic and cultural power in Asia. Rajaraja Chola conquered peninsular South India, annexed parts of Sri Lanka and occupied the islands of the northernmost atolls of the Maldives. Rajendra Chola sent a victorious expedition to North India that touched the river Ganges and defeated the Pala ruler of Pataliputra, Mahipala. He also raided kingdoms of Maritime Southeast Asia. (Note: The kadaram campaign is first mentioned in Rajendra's inscriptions dating from his 14th year. The name of the Srivijaya king was Sangrama Vijayatungavarman. – K.A. Nilakanta Sastri, The CōĻas, pp 211–220)

An inscription from Sirkazhi, dated 1187 CE, mentions a naval officer called Araiyan Kadalkolamitantaan alias Amarakon Pallavaraiyan. He is mentioned as the Tandalnayagam of the Karaippadaiyilaar. The term Karaippadaiyilaar means "forces or army of the seashore" and the title Tandalnayagam is similar to Dandanayaka and means "commander of the forces". The title Kadalkolamitantaan means "one who floated while the sea was engulfed".

== Trade, commerce, and diplomacy ==
The Cholas excelled in foreign trade and maritime activity, extending their influence overseas to China and Southeast Asia. A fragmentary Tamil inscription found in Sumatra cites the name of a merchant guild Nanadesa Tisaiyayirattu Ainnutruvar (literally, "the five hundred from the four countries and the thousand directions"), a famous merchant guild in the Chola country. The inscription is dated 1088, indicating that there was an active overseas trade during the Chola period.

Towards the end of the 9th century, southern India had developed extensive maritime and commercial activity, especially with the Chinese and Arabs. The Cholas, having parts of both the west and the east coasts of peninsular India, were at the forefront of these ventures. The Tang dynasty of China, the Srivijaya empire in the Malayan archipelago under the Sailendras, and the Abbasid caliphate at Baghdad were the main trading partners.

=== Cooperation with the Chinese ===
Chinese Song Dynasty reports record that an embassy from Chulian (Chola) reached the Chinese court in the year 1077, and that the king of the Chulien at the time was called Ti-hua-kia-lo. It is possible that these syllables denote "Deva Kulo[tunga]" (Kulothunga Chola I). This embassy was a trading venture and was highly profitable to the visitors, who returned with "81,800 strings of copper coins in exchange for articles of tributes, including glass articles, and spices". (Note: "The Tamil merchants took glassware, camphor, sandalwood, rhinoceros horns, ivory, rose water, asafoetida, spices such as pepper, cloves, etc." – K.A. Nilakanta Sastri, A History of South India, p 173)

== Vessels and weapons ==
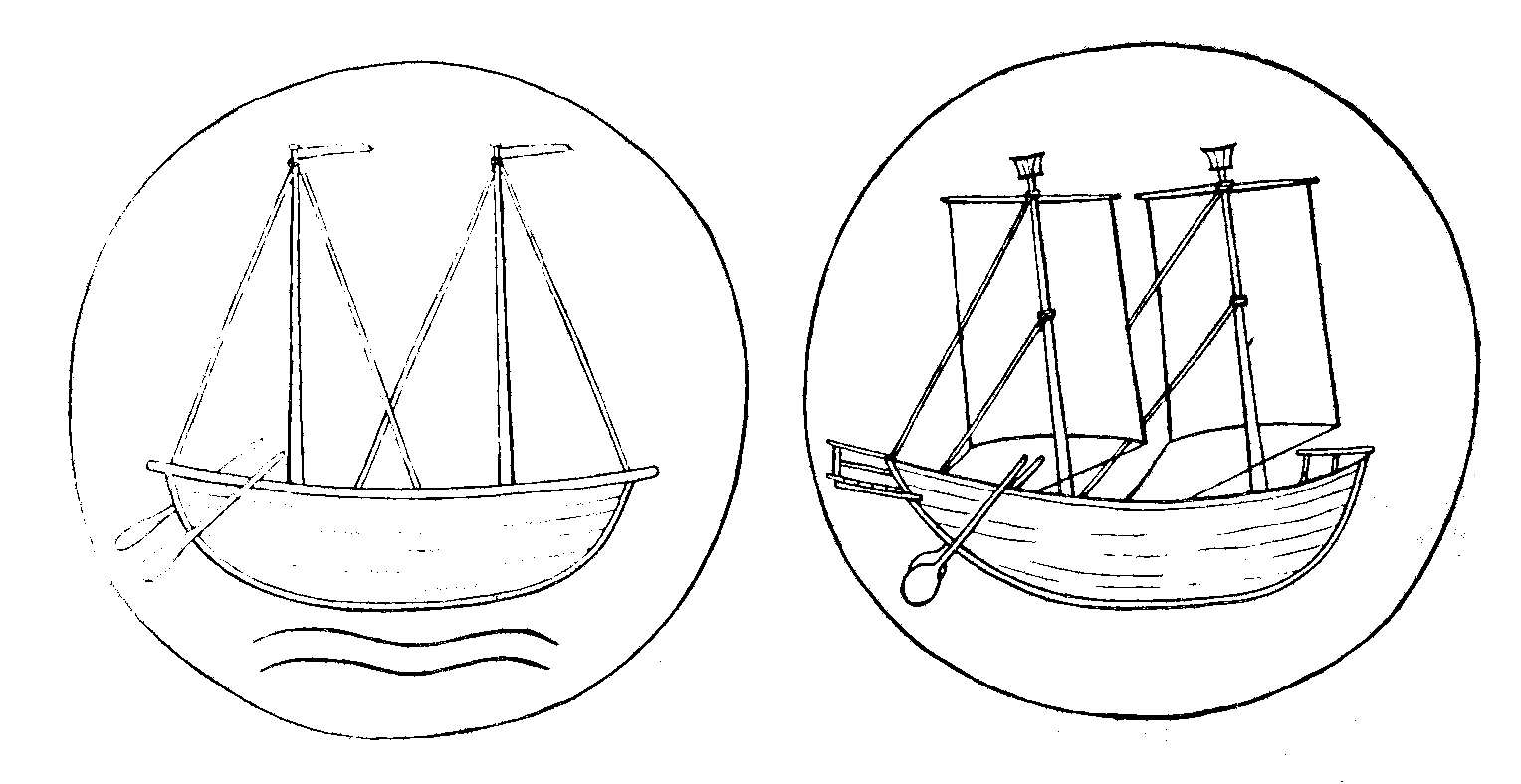
Left: Kurumbas or Pallava coin of the Coromandel coast; showing a two-masted ship like the modern coasting vessel or d'honi, Right: Andhra coin from Eastern Indian coast, showing a two-masted ship, ca. 1st–3rd century CE.

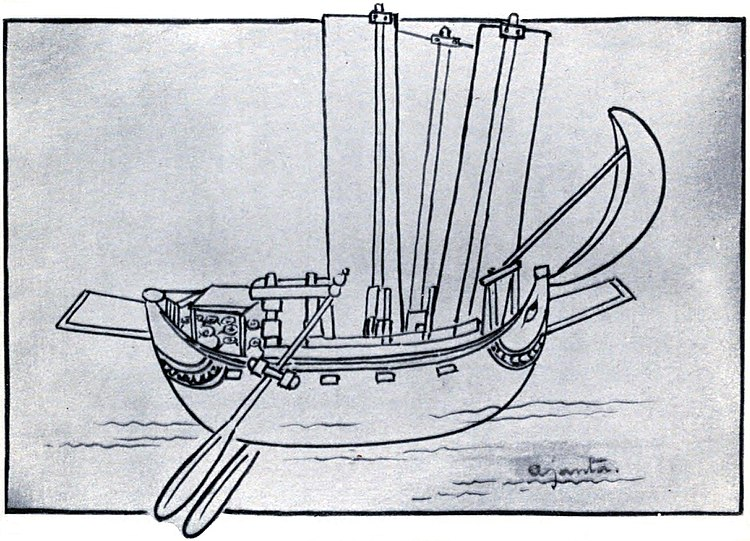
Sketch of a ship based on a mural in Ajanta Caves, ca. 6th century.

Very little information about Chola ships has survived. Because of this, the technique used for naval battles and how the battles were fought is unknown. R.C. Majumdar argues that the naval battles fought by Chola were land battles fought on ships, and the ships used were transports used for transporting the army. It is also possible that the Cholas did not fight naval battles—the battles were fought on land. Despite their maritime connection, the Cholas left no traces of maritime or ship-related iconography, unlike the earlier Sathavahanas, Salankayanas, Kurumbas, and Pallavas.

Rajendra Chola's inscriptions mentioned the term kalam, which is a usual term for a ship. A Tamil inscription from Barus, Sumatra, dated 1088 CE mentioned marakkalam (timber ship). The size of the ship and where it was constructed are unknown. A Tamil inscription of about 1200/1256 CE from Krishnapattinam, on the Andhra coast, mentioned several sea vessels: There are marakkalam, toni, kalavam, vedi, and padavu. Their size is not recorded, Y. Subbarayalu thinks that the marakkalam may have been the biggest since it was mentioned first, and it may be about 4 times bigger than padavu since it was charged 4 times the charge on padavu. The Toni (also pronounced as dhony) was charged the same amount as marakkalam, but according to Subbarayalu they may be smaller than marakkalam in size. The dhony continued operating in the 19th century, plying the routes between Sri Lanka and Madras (Chennai). The dhony was 70 feet (21.34 m) long, 20 feet (6.10 m) wide, 12 feet (3.66 m) deep, with no decks, and had one mast.

== Campaigns ==
Chola military campaigns late 10th and early 11th centuries were plundering invasions and conquests. This is done to ensure the entry of spoils obtained from such conquests, which can be in the form of livestock, jewellery, and other forms of property.

== See also ==
- Chola dynasty
- Chola military
- Dravidian architecture
