= Chola invasion of Anuradhapura =

Karikala Chola Invasion of Srilanka
- Part of Chola–Sinhalese wars
Date	c. 110 CE (traditional date)
Location	Anuradhapura, Sri Lanka
Result	Chola victory (traditional account)

Belligerents
Early Cholas	Lambakanna dynasty

Commanders and leaders
Karikala	Vankanasika Tissa

Strength
Unknown	Unknown

Casualties and losses
Unknown	Unknown; 12,000 reportedly captured

According to the Rajavaliya, Karikala, the leader of the Chola dynasty, invaded Sri Lanka in 110. Karikala’s forces defeated the ruler Vankanasika Tissa and capturing 12,000 Sinhalese prisoners of war, who were used for forced labor during the construction of the Grand Anicut.

== Events ==
The Chola invasion of Anurathapura happened in 110 AD, during the reign of Vankanasika Tissa, the ruler of the Lambakanna dynasty. Karikala had a powerful navy, which he used to capture Sri Lanka. During the campaign, Karikala’s forced defeated Vankanasika Tissa and captured 12,000 Sinhalese Prisoners along with treasures and The war Prosoners was to work as slaves to build the Kaveri Dam. Kallanai is a massive dam of unhewn stone, 329 metres (1,080 ft) long and 20 metres (60 ft) wide, across the main stream of the Kaveri. A later Chola record from Tiruvaduturai refers to this event that is raising the banks of the Kaveri by Parakesari Karikala Chola.
