= Battle of Nettur =

Battle in south India in 1188

Date	1188
Location	Nettur
Result	Chola victory

Belligerents
Chola Empire and Pandyan kingdom	Pandyan troops loyal to Vira Pandya

Commanders and leaders
Kulothunga Chola III, Vikrama Pandya	Vira Pandya

Strength
Unknown	Unknown

Casualties and losses
Unknown	Unknown

The Battle of Nettur was an engagement between the Chola Emperor Kulothunga Chola III and Vira Pandya, the claimant to the Pandya throne in 1188. The subsequent crisis was erupted in the aftermath of the Pandyan Civil War, which led to the ascension of Vira Pandya.

== Causes ==
The Cholas set up Vira Pandya on the Pandyan throne at the end of an 8-year civil war. However, Vira Pandya soon broke off his allegiance to the Cholas causing a Chola army to invade Madurai in 1182 and replace him with Vikrama Pandya, a rival claimant.

== Events ==
In 1188, the fugitive, Vira Pandya invaded the Pandya kingdom and tried to reclaim his throne. A large Chola army was sent to oppose him. The two armies met at Nettur and Vira Pandya was defeated and forced to flee.

== Aftermath ==
Vira Pandya fled to Kollam where he was welcomed by the ruler of Venad. But shortly afterwards, mindful of the extensive resources and power of the Chola Empire and deeming prolonged resistance to be impractical, the Venad ruler counselled peace and the two submitted to Kulothunga Chola III. Vira Pandya was given a vast land grant in Madurai though his regal title and royal possessions were taken away from him.
