= Kundavai =

Name of several royal women in India

Kundhavai was a historic and a popular name of a number of royal women in southern India between the ninth and eleventh century. Some of the women who went by the name Kundavai are as follows:

- Kundhavai, the daughter of Western Ganga king Prithvipati I (853–880 AD), who was married to the Bana prince Vikramaditya I, the son and successor of Malladeva. She gave several gifts to the Siva temple in Tiruvallam.
- Kundhavai Pirāttiyār, the elder sister of the king Raja Raja Chola, and the queen of the chief Vallavaraiyan Vandiyadevan mentioned in the Tanjore inscriptions.
- Rajarajan Kundhavi Alvar, the daughter of Raja Raja Chola and younger sister of Rajendra Chola, the queen of the Eastern Chalukya king Vimaladitya and the mother of Rajaraja Narendra.
