= Arinjaya Chola =

Chola emperor from 956 to 957

- Parakesari Varman, Arikulakesari
- Reign: 956–957
- Predecessor: Gandaraditya
- Successor: Parantaka Chola II
- Born: 897; Thanjavur
- Died: 957; Aarur (Tiruvarur)
- Empresses: Kalyani; Viman Kundaviyar; Kothai Pirattiyar
- Issue: Parantaka Chola II (Sundara Chola)
- Dynasty: Chola
- Father: Parantaka I
- Mother: Chera princess of Paluvettaraiyar family
- Religion: Hinduism

Arinjaya Chola was a ruler of the Chola kingdom. He was the third son of Parantaka I and the younger brother of Gandaraditya Chola, whom he is thought to have succeeded in about 956. Arinjaya Chola was succeeded by his son Sundara Chola (Parantaka II) as Madurantaka Uttama Chola was not old enough to ascend the throne. Arinjaya seems to have ruled for a very short time.

According to the Anbil Plates of Sundara Chola, Arinjaya's mother was the daughter of a Paluvettaraiyar, who is described therein as a Chera prince.

== Other names ==
Arinjaya is also referred to by the names Arikulakesari, Arikesari, or Arindama. His name is mentioned in some of Gandaraditya's inscriptions as Alvar Arikulakesarideva.

== Paucity of information ==
There is some confusion regarding whether Arinjaya actually succeeded Gandaraditya. Some historians doubt whether Arinjaya ruled on his own right. There is little epigraphic evidence available to give us any concrete information on Arinjaya's rule. What we know now is partly speculative and partly informed extrapolations of known facts.

Gandaraditya probably made his younger brother co-regent very early in his rule. It is also very probable that Gandaraditya did not have any heir until very late in his life. As a result, he must have made Arinjaya heir apparent and paved the way for Arinjaya's heirs to the line of succession to the Chola crown.

== Personal life ==
Cola-Cera Perumal relations (c. 9th-10th centuries CE)

Sister?	Sthanu Ravi Kulasekhara
Vijayaraga (Jayaraga?)	Ravi Nili alias Kilan Atikal
Ravi Nili alias Ko Kilan Atikal (fl. 935/36)	Parantaka I (fl. 907-955)	Paluvettaraiyar princess (Arumoli Nankaiyar?)
Rajaditya (fl. 948/49)	Arinjaya

We can gather a good deal information from the epigraphs left behind by his peers. He was married to a Vaidumba princess of Eastern Chalukyas called Kalyani, who bore him Sundara Chola. Yet another queen was Boothi Aditya Pidari, the daughter of Tennavan Irukkuvel alias Maravan Boothi. She founded the Chandrasekara temple in Tiruchendurai. This Tennavan Irukkuvel alias Boothi has been identified with none other than Boothi Vikramakesari the builder of the Moovar Koil temple.

== Death and succession ==
Arinjaya died c. 957 in a place called Arrur, which is possibly present-day Tiruvarur. From an inscription found near Melpadi in north Tamil Nadu, we learn that Rajaraja Chola I erected a Siva temple called Arinjisvara as a tomb-shrine in memory of his grandfather Arinjaya who was also known as "Arrur tunjina devan".

Arinjaya was succeeded by his son Parantaka Chola II (Sundara Chola). Two of his wives Viman Kundaviyar and Kodai Pirattiyar seem to have survived him and made gifts to temples in Arinjaya's name during Parantaka II's reign.

== Inscription ==
Arinjaya figures in some of the inscriptions of his father Parantaka. Here is an excerpt,

..records a gift of 40 Ilakasu(equivalent of 20 Kalanju of gold) and 10 kalanju of gold by Parantakan Arikulakesari, the son of Cholaperumaanadigal for burning a perpetual lamp in the temple of Mahadeva in Tiruneyttanam

Yet another one from a temple in Tiruvorriyur is as follows,

On the eleventh slab. Records in the 30th year of Maduraikonda Parakesarivarman(Parantaka) dated in his 30th year, gift of gold for a lamp by Arindigai-perumanar, son of Chola-Perumanadigal (i.e Parantaka), to the god Siva at Adhigrama.

== See also ==
- Thiruvilandur Copper Plate - a royal land-grant charter, issued during the reigns of Rajadhiraja Chola I and Rajendra Chola II.

== Notes ==
Preceded by Gandaraditya	Chola; 956–957 CE	Succeeded by Sundara Chola
