= Ponniyin Selvan: II =

2023 Indian film by Mani Ratnam

- Theatrical release poster
- Directed by: Mani Ratnam
- Screenplay by: Mani Ratnam; Elango Kumaravel; B. Jeyamohan
- Based on: Ponniyin Selvan by Kalki Krishnamurthy
- Produced by: Mani Ratnam; Subaskaran Allirajah
- Starring: Vikram; Aishwarya Rai Bachchan; Ravi Mohan; Karthi; Trisha Krishnan; Prabhu; Sarath Kumar; Vikram Prabhu; Aishwarya Lekshmi; Sobhita Dhulipala; Prakash Raj
- Narrated by: Kamal Haasan
- Cinematography: Ravi Varman
- Edited by: A. Sreekar Prasad
- Music by: A. R. Rahman
- Production company: Madras Talkies Lyca Productions
- Distributed by: Red Giant Movies
- Release date: 28 April 2023
- Running time: 165 minutes
- Country: India
- Language: Tamil
- Budget: See production
- Box office: ₹342–346 crore (Note: Ponniyin Selvan: II's reported worldwide grosses vary between ₹342 crore (Cinema Express) – ₹345 crore (News18) – ₹346 crore (DNA India))

Ponniyin Selvan: II (PS-2, transl. The Son of Ponni) is a 2023 Indian Tamil-language epic historical action drama film directed by Mani Ratnam, who co-wrote it with Elango Kumaravel and B. Jeyamohan. The film is produced by Mani Ratnam and Subaskaran Allirajah under Madras Talkies and Lyca Productions. The second of two cinematic parts based on the 1954 novel Ponniyin Selvan by Kalki Krishnamurthy, it serves as a direct sequel to Ponniyin Selvan: I (2022). The film stars an ensemble cast including Vikram, Aishwarya Rai Bachchan, Ravi Mohan (as the title character), Karthi, Trisha Krishnan, Jayaram, Prabhu, R. Sarathkumar, Sobhita Dhulipala, Aishwarya Lekshmi, Vikram Prabhu, Prakash Raj, Rahman, R. Parthiban and others. It continues to follow the prince Arulmozhi Varman (who would become the emperor Rajaraja I) and his family as they deal with threats to the Chola Empire.

Ponniyin Selvan was initially intended to be a single film, but was split into two parts that were produced concurrently. Joint principal photography for both parts began in December 2019, halting twice due to the COVID-19 pandemic, and ultimately wrapping on 16 September 2021. The soundtrack was composed by A. R. Rahman, with cinematography by Ravi Varman, editing by A. Sreekar Prasad, and production design by Thota Tharani.

Ponniyin Selvan: II was released in theatres worldwide on 28 April 2023 in standard, IMAX, 4DX, and EPIQ formats, and received positive reviews from critics. It was featured at the 54th IFFI Indian Panorama mainstream section.

== Plot ==
A flashback chronicles the childhood romance between Aditha Karikalan and Nandini in Pazhayarai. Despite their deep bond, Karikalan's sister, Kundavai, and their grand-aunt, Sembiyan Madevi, forcefully expel the low-born Nandini from the kingdom during Karikalan’s military deployment. Devastated upon his return, Karikalan learns that Nandini has sought refuge under the rival Pandya king, Veerapandiyan, establishing her lifelong vendetta against the Chola dynasty.

In the current timeline, the presumed drowning of Prince Arulmozhi Varman throws the Chola Empire into deep mourning. Sensing an opportunity, the vengeful Nandini manipulates the smitten Chola chieftain Parthibendran Pallavan into diverting Crown Prince Karikalan to a trap at Kadambur Palace. Concurrently, the fanatical Pandya Abathudavigal assassins pursue the surviving royal lineage. In reality, a frail Arulmozhi Varman has survived the ocean storm but is incapacitated by a severe shipboard fever. He is clandestinely escorted to a Buddhist monastery in Nagapattinam by Vallavaraiyan Vandiyadevan, Poonguzhali, and the Vaishnavite spy Azhwarkadiyan Nambi. While running a distraction to throw off the pursuing Pandya assassins, Vandiyadevan is captured. In prison, he overhears Nandini planning Karikalan's assassination, but he buys his freedom by revealing that he witnessed Oomai Rani, the mute, mystical lookalike of Nandini, acting as Arulmozhi's silent protector. Nambi subsequently rescues Vandiyadevan, who rushes to warn Kundavai.

Kundavai and Karikalan converge at Nagapattinam, where Arulmozhi is convalescing. Although Vandiyadevan warns Karikalan of the trap awaiting him in Kadambur, the arrogant Crown Prince dismisses the threat. Meanwhile, Arulmozhi reveals the striking physical resemblance between Oomai Rani and Nandini. This prompts a suspicious Kundavai to confront her father, Emperor Sundara Chola, in Thanjavur. The bedridden Emperor confesses his past romance in Lanka with Mandakini Devi (the Mute Queen). Meanwhile, internal rebellions fracture the capital; the ambitious Prince Madhurantakan allies with the rival Rashtrakuta dynasty to claim the regency. However, the unexpected arrival of a recovered Arulmozhi Varman and his prospective bride, Vaanathi, defuses the warring domestic factions and restores peace to the Thanjavur fort.

Karikalan arrives at Kadambur Palace, where the conspirators propose partitioning the empire to appease Madhurantakan. Seeking only his siblings' safety, Karikalan shocks the council by offering to abdicate his claim and surrender the entire domain to Madhurantakan, provided he retains control of the military. The council agrees, and finance minister Periya Pazhuvettaraiyar departs for Thanjavur to finalize the treaty. En route, he learns from a local rower that the Pandyas have breached Kadambur via subterranean tunnels to assassinate Karikalan. Periya Pazhuvettaraiyar and a arriving Vandiyadevan rush back to intervene, but both are knocked unconscious by the infiltrators. Simultaneously, the assassins infiltrate Thanjavur, where Mandakini shields Emperor Sundara Chola from a fatal arrow, sacrificing her life just before Arulmozhi Varman arrives to decimate the remaining infiltrators.

In the secluded chambers of Kadambur, Karikalan confronts a conflicted Nandini. Recognizing her internal struggle between her past love and her sworn vengeance, a guilt-ridden Karikalan confesses that the agony of their separation outweighs his desire to live. When Nandini falters, Karikalan draws his own dagger and drives it into his chest while embracing her, choosing death to fulfill her vendetta. As he expires, a traumatized Nandini screams in grief, realizing her residual love for him. The fleeing Pandya assassins drag her away through the tunnels to save her from execution, framing the unconscious Vandiyadevan and Periya Pazhuvettaraiyar for the regicide.

Upon regaining consciousness, a devastated Vandiyadevan carries Karikalan's body to the nobles, who immediately arrest him for murder. On a getaway vessel, a captive rower reveals to a grieving Nandini that her biological father was actually Veerapandiyan, who had violated a vulnerable Mandakini, making Nandini an illegitimate princess. Overwhelmed by the horrific revelations and the weight of Karikalan's death, a broken Nandini commits suicide by drowning herself in the Ponni River.

In Thanjavur, Periya Pazhuvettaraiyar returns to court to exonerate Vandiyadevan, publicly confessing the details of the Pandya conspiracy. However, Parthibendran Pallavan, believing the royal family orchestrated the tragedy, launches a massive retaliatory invasion alongside the Rashtrakutas. Sundara Chola releases Vandiyadevan to ride alongside Arulmozhi Varman into the impending conflict. Realizing the existential threat to his homeland, Madhurantakan defects from his foreign allies and joins forces with Arulmozhi, securing a decisive victory for the Chola military. Following the war, a weary Sundara Chola abdicates the throne. On his scheduled coronation day, a selfless Arulmozhi Varman shocks the empire by stepping aside and crowning his cousin Madhurantakan, who ascends as Emperor 'Uttama Chola.'

The epilogue notes that Vandiyadevan and Arulmozhi Varman subsequently spearheaded historic naval conquests across the seas. Following Uttama Chola's eventual demise, Arulmozhi Varman finally ascends the throne, taking the legendary mantle of 'Rajaraja Chola I,' while the remaining Pandya pockets are decisively systematically suppressed.

== Cast ==
- Vikram as Aditha Karikalan
  - Santhosh as young Aditha Karikalan
- Aishwarya Rai Bachchan in a dual role:
  - as Nandini (voice: Deepa Venkat)
    - Sara Arjun as young Nandini
  - as Mandakini Devi ("Oomai Rani")
- Ravi Mohan as Arulmozhi Varman ("Ponniyin Selvan")
  - Samartha Satyajit as young Arulmozhi Varman
- Karthi as Vanthiyathevan
- Trisha Krishnan (voice: Krithika Nelson) as Kundavai
  - Nila as young Kundavai
- Jayaram as Azhwarkkadiyan Nambi / Thirumalaiappan
- Prabhu as Periya Vellar Boothi Vikramakesari
- R. Sarathkumar as Periya Pazhuvettaraiyar
- Vikram Prabhu as Parthibendran Pallavan
- Aishwarya Lekshmi (voice: Ashmini Balakrishnan) as Poonguzhali
- Sobhita Dhulipala (voice: Smruthi K) as Vanathi
- Prakash Raj as Sundara Chola
- Rahman (voice: Azhagam Perumal) as Madhurantakan
- R. Parthiban as Chinna Pazhuvettaraiyar / Kaalanthakandar
- Jayachitra as Sembiyan Mahadevi
- Ashwin Kakumanu as Sendhan Amudhan
- Lal as Malaiyaman
- Kishore as Ravidasan
- Riyaz Khan as Soman Sambavan
- Babu Antony (voice: Thalaivasal Vijay) as Khottiga Amogavarshan
- Makarand Deshpande as Chief Kalamugar
- Vinodhini Vaidyanathan as Vasuki
- Nasser as Veerapandiyan
- Nizhalgal Ravi as Sambuvarayar
- Mohan Raman as Aniruddha Brahmarayar
- Balaji Sakthivel as Vanangamudiyar
- Yog Japee (voice: Chethan) as Karuthiruman
- Vidhya Subramanian as Vaanavan Maadevi
- Vinay Kumar Joseph as Devaralan
- Nimmy Raphael as Rakkamma
- Aswin Rao as Kandhamaran
- Harris Moosa as Kalapathi
- Pondy Ravi as PP Commander
- S. Radhakrishnan as Nagapattinam Bikshu
- Bharat Raj as Karka
- A. Seemon as Ugradevan
- Anil Kumar as Pasupathi
- Shakti Ramani as Kani
- Shreema Upadhyaya as Maathuli
- Raghav as Amarabujanga Pandiyan
- Ramchandran as Rajaaliyar
- Jaichandran as Thanthongi Kalingarayar
- Amzath Khan (voice: Gowtham) as Mazhavarayar
- Kannan as Kundrathur Kizhar
- Sundaram as Mazhapadi Thennavan
- Jaindhan as Mummudi Pallavarayar
- Nambi as Muttharayar
- Balla Bhoopalan as Idumbankari

=== Narration ===
The narration was by Kamal Haasan (both trailer and film), Anil Kapoor (trailer)/Ajay Devgn (film), Rana Daggubati (trailer)/Chiranjeevi (film), Prithviraj Sukumaran (trailer)/Mammootty (film) and Jayanth Kaikini (trailer)/Upendra (film) in the Tamil, Hindi, Telugu, Malayalam, and Kannada languages respectively.

== Production ==
Ponniyin Selvan was originally planned as a single film with a budget of ₹500 crore (US$52 million). After principal photography commenced in December 2019, it was reported in January 2020 that the film would be split into two parts, which was confirmed by Mani Ratnam that April. Both parts were to be shot back-to-back, with some sources reporting that the ₹500 crore budget was spread across two parts. In September 2021, production of the first part wrapped, with filming for a few sequences of the second part remaining. Part of this took place in March 2022, with a sequence involving Ravi and Karthi filmed in Mumbai. The remaining patchwork of Ponniyin Selvan: II was filmed in January 2023.

== Music ==
The film score and soundtrack were composed by Mani Ratnam's regular collaborator A. R. Rahman. The audio rights of the film were purchased by Tips Industries.

The soundtrack consists of seven original songs composed by A. R. Rahman. The first, "Aga Naga", was released as a single on 20 March 2023. The remaining tracks were revealed at a trailer and audio launch on 29 March 2023. Lyrics for the Tamil version of the soundtrack were written by Ilango Krishnan. It includes Sangam-literature poet Kudavayil Keerathanar's excerpts, whereas "Aazhi Mazhai Kanna" was inspired from Andal's Tiruppavai, and "Shivoham" from Adi Shankara's Atma Shatakam in the Tamil version. Gulzar, Anantha Sriram, Chandrabose, Ramajogayya Sastry, Rafeeq Ahamed and Jayanth Kaikini wrote the song lyrics in Hindi, Telugu, Malayalam, and Kannada respectively.

In May 2023, Wasifuddin Dagar claimed that "Veera Raja Veera" had been adapted from a 1978 Dhrupad composition by the Junior Dagar Brothers without attribution. The case was closed by the Supreme Court in February 2026 with the direction to add the following line in the song credits: “Composition inspired from the Dagarwani tradition Dhrupad, first recorded as Shiv Stuti by late Ustad Nasir Faiyazuddin Dagar and Ustad Nasir Zahiruddin Dagar, popularly known as Junior Dagar brothers."

== Release ==
=== Theatrical ===
Ponniyin Selvan: II was released in standard, IMAX, 4DX and EPIQ formats in theatres on 28 April 2023 worldwide. It is the first South Indian film to release in 4DX format.

=== Distribution ===
The distribution rights of the film in Tamil Nadu were acquired by Red Giant Movies. The Andhra Pradesh and Telangana distribution rights were bought by Dil Raju's Sri Venkateswara Creations. The Kerala distribution rights were bought by Gokulam Gopalan's Sree Gokulam Movies. The North India distribution rights were acquired by Pen India Limited. Lyca Productions acquired the overseas distribution rights.

=== Home media ===
The digital streaming rights for the film were purchased by Amazon Prime Video for ₹125 crore (US$13 million) and started streaming on the platform from 2 June 2023 in Tamil and dubbed versions of Telugu, Malayalam and Kannada languages. The Hindi dubbed version was premiered from 23 June 2023. The satellite rights of the film was sold to Sun TV.

== Reception ==
=== Box office ===
The film grossed ₹342–346 crore and is the third highest-grossing Tamil film of 2023 and one of the highest-grossing Tamil films worldwide.

=== Critical response ===
On the review aggregator website Rotten Tomatoes, 88% of 8 critics' reviews are positive, with an average rating of 6.4/10. Ponniyin Selvan: II received positive reviews from critics.

Kirubhakar Purushothaman, of The Indian Express, gave 4.0 out of 5 stars and wrote "While the fans of the book might be disappointed with some major deviations from the book, the ace director understands the form won't let him be entirely faithful to the novel." Haricharan Pudipeddi, a critic of Hindustan Times, wrote "Apart from the gut-wrenching drama, it's the exquisite that elevate PS 2 in terms of delivering a larger-than-life viewing experience." M. Suganth of The Times of India gave 3.5 out of 5 stars and opined that "right until the climax, this doomed romance is what sustains the tension in this tale and drives the characters to make decisions that have far-reaching impact". Sukanya Verma from Rediff.com gave 3.5 stars out of 5 and stated "Ratnam's spectacle may be steeped in fiction and fantasy but its entitlement and opportunism feels as real and relevant as ever."

A critic from India Today gave 3 stars out of 5 stars and appreciated the film. Nandini Ramnath critic of Scroll.in mentioned the film as having "Mesmerising visuals and memorable characters". However, News18 gave a mixed review. Manoj Kumar of OTTplay gave 3 out of 5 and stated "Mani Ratnam has done a fabulous job in translating this epic novel onto the big screen". Srinivasa Ramanujam of The Hindu called it a "satisfying sequel", saying that "Ponniyin Selvan: II takes creative liberties from Kalki's material, but the performances and cinematic touches keep you invested".

=== Controversies ===
The Ponniyin Selvan film series was initially involved in controversy about ignoring the Shaivite nature of the Cholas and using the director's sect Sricharanam instead of Tripundra on the forehead. Ahead of its release, this was corrected with visual effects and almost all Chola characters appear with a computer-generated image of a Thiruneeru in the films. Also, the assassins of co-regent Aditta Karikalan were not shown as all Brahmins from North of Cauvery Delta, that was a region he reclaimed from Rastrakutas, as was in history per Udayarkudi inscriptions.

== Accolades ==
Award ceremony	Year	Category	Nominee / Work	Result	Ref.
Filmfare Awards South	2024	Best Film – Tamil	Ponniyin Selvan: II	Nominated	
Filmfare Awards South	2024	Best Director – Tamil	Mani Ratnam	Nominated	
Filmfare Awards South	2024	Best Actor – Tamil	Vikram	Won	
Filmfare Awards South	2024	Best Actress – Tamil	Aishwarya Rai Bachchan	Nominated	
Filmfare Awards South	2024	Best Actress – Tamil	Trisha Krishnan	Nominated	
Filmfare Awards South	2024	Best Male Playback Singer – Tamil	Haricharan for "Chinnanjiru Nilave"	Won	
Filmfare Awards South	2024	Best Female Playback Singer – Tamil	K. S. Chithra & Harini for "Veera Raja Veera"	Nominated	
Filmfare Awards South	2024	Best Female Playback Singer – Tamil	Shakthisree Gopalan for "Aga Naga"	Nominated	
Filmfare Awards South	2024	Best Music Director – Tamil	A. R. Rahman	Nominated	
Filmfare Awards South	2024	Best Lyricist – Tamil	Ilango Krishnan for "Aga Naga"	Won	
Filmfare Awards South	2024	Best Lyricist – Tamil	Ilango Krishnan for "Veera Raja Veera"	Nominated	
Filmfare Awards South	2024	Best Cinematography	Ravi Varman	Won	
Filmfare Awards South	2024	Best Production Design	Thota Tharani	Won	
SIIMA Awards	2024	Best Film – Tamil	Ponniyin Selvan: II	Nominated	
SIIMA Awards	2024	Best Director – Tamil	Mani Ratnam	Nominated	
SIIMA Awards	2024	Best Cinematography – Tamil	Ravi Varman	Nominated	
SIIMA Awards	2024	Best Actor – Tamil	Vikram	Won	
SIIMA Awards	2024	Best Actress – Tamil	Aishwarya Rai Bachchan	Nominated	
SIIMA Awards	2024	Best Music Director – Tamil	A. R. Rahman	Nominated	
SIIMA Awards	2024	Best Male Playback Singer – Tamil	Haricharan for "Chinnanjiru Nilave"	Nominated	
SIIMA Awards	2024	Best Female Playback Singer – Tamil	Shakthisree Gopalan for "Aga Naga"	Won	
SIIMA Awards	2024	Best Actress Critics – Tamil	Aishwarya Rai Bachchan	Won	
IIFA Utsavam	2024	Best Picture	Ponniyin Selvan: II	Nominated	
IIFA Utsavam	2024	Best Direction	Mani Ratnam	Won	
IIFA Utsavam	2024	Performance in a Leading Role – Male	Karthi	Nominated	
IIFA Utsavam	2024	Performance in a Leading Role – Male	Vikram	Won	
IIFA Utsavam	2024	Performance in a Leading Role – Female	Aishwarya Rai Bachchan	Won	
IIFA Utsavam	2024	Performance in a Leading Role – Female	Trisha	Nominated	
IIFA Utsavam	2024	Performance in a Supporting Role – Male	Jayaram	Won	
IIFA Utsavam	2024	Performance in a Supporting Role – Male	R. Sarathkumar	Nominated	
IIFA Utsavam	2024	Performance in a Supporting Role – Female	Aishwarya Lekshmi	Nominated	
IIFA Utsavam	2024	Best Music Direction	A. R. Rahman	Won	
IIFA Utsavam	2024	Best Background Score	A. R. Rahman	Won	
IIFA Utsavam	2024	Best Lyricist	Ilango Krishnan for "Veera Raja Veera"	Nominated	
IIFA Utsavam	2024	Best Playback Singer – Male	Haricharan for "Chinnanjiru Nilave"	Won	
IIFA Utsavam	2024	Best Playback Singer – Female	Shakthisree Gopalan for "Aga Naga"	Won	
IIFA Utsavam	2024	Best Cinematography	Ravi Varman	Won	
IIFA Utsavam	2024	Best Production Design	Thota Tharani	Won	
