= Paradurkkamarthanan =

Paradurkkamarthanan (Tamil: பரதுர்க்கமர்த்தனன்; c. 615–645 CE) was an Irukkuvel king who ruled the city of Kodumbalur during the Pandyan and Pallava period. He is listed seventh in the Moovar Koil inscription, which details the genealogy of the Irukkuvel dynasty. Since he bore the title Vatabijit ("Conqueror of Vatabi"), it is inferred that he assisted the Pallava king Narasimhavarman I in his conquest of Vatabi. Based on Paradurkkamarthanans title, the reign of Narasimhavarman I, the Kalabhra period, and the Moovar Koil inscription, historian M. Arokiaswami constructed a chronological list of the Irukkuvel kings.
