= Velir =

Royal house of Yadu dynasty

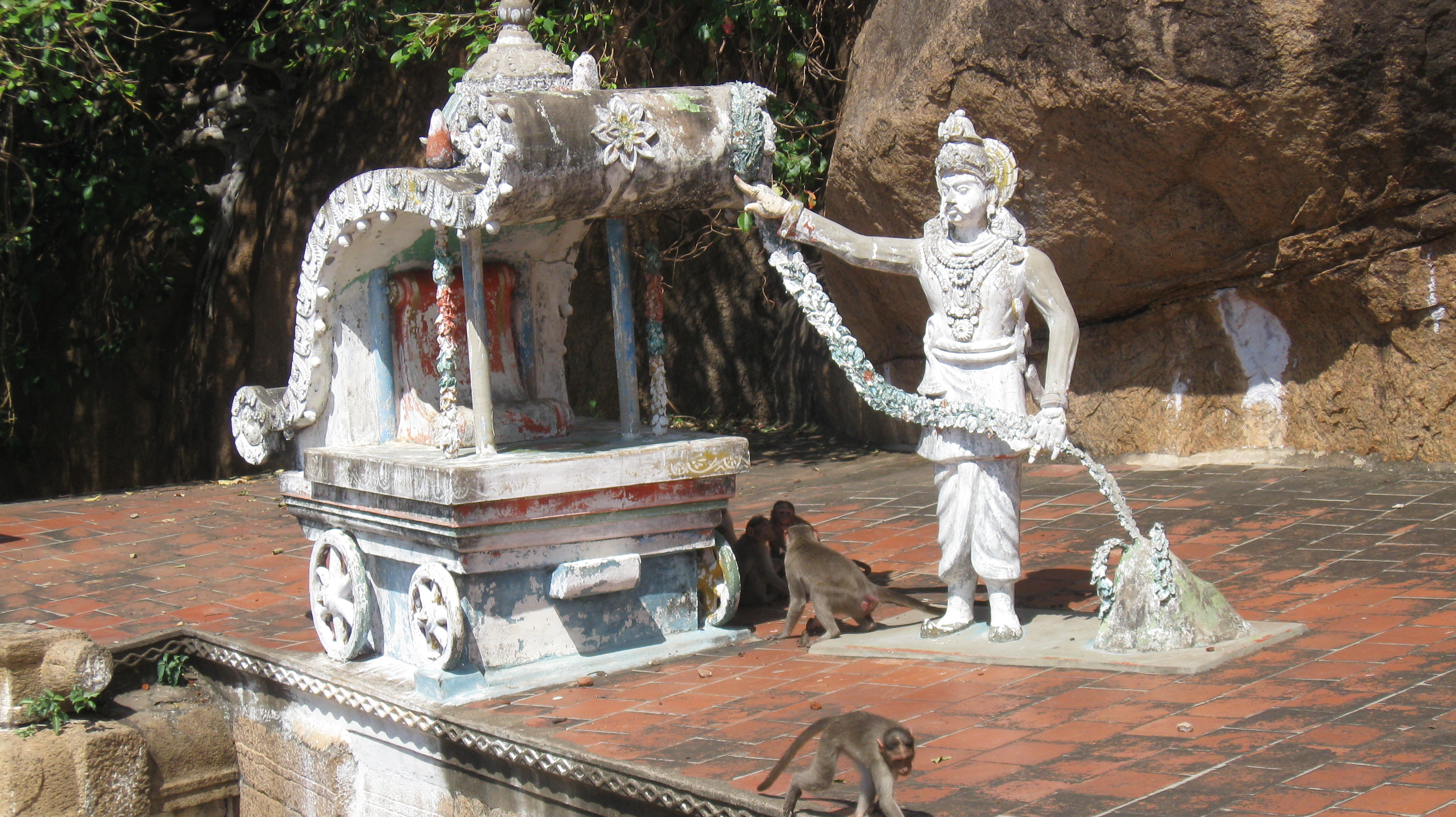
- A statue of the Sangam period Velir king
- Current region: South India and Sri Lanka
- Titles: Satyaputra
- Connected families: Ay; Athiyamān; Irunkōvēl; Ilanji Vel; Malayamān; Nannan; Vēl Pāri; Vel Avi Pekan

The Velir were aristocratic nobility in Tamilakam in the early historic period of South India and Sri Lanka. They had close relations with Chera, Chola and Pandya rulers through ruling and coronation rights. Medieval inscriptions and Sangam literature claim that they belong to the Yadu dynasty. Velir may refer to master of land.

== Origin ==
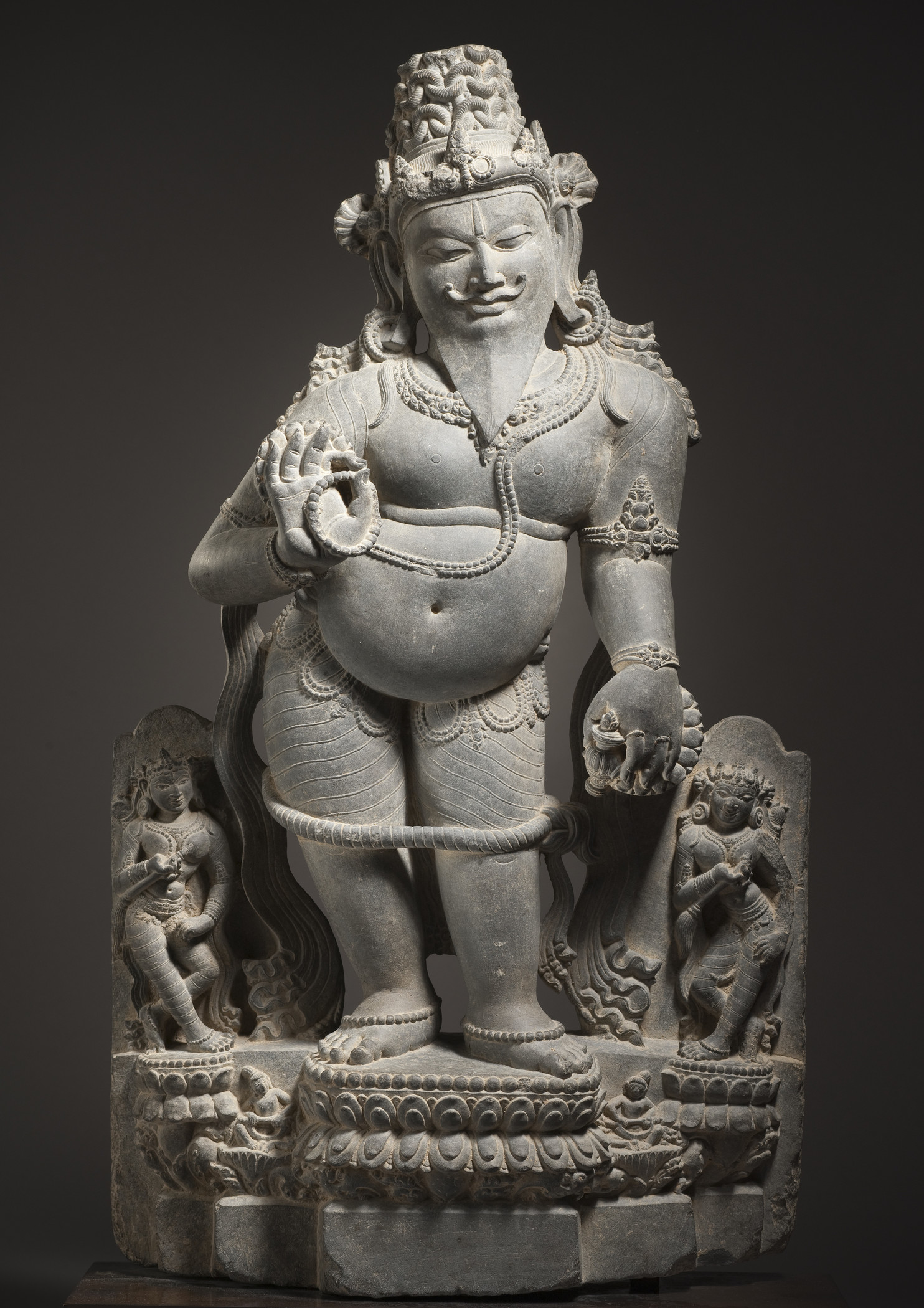
A 12th-century statue of Agastya

The Purananuru, one of the Eight Anthologies of Sangam literature, praises King Irunkōvēl, a 49th generation descendant of the Vēlir clan whose ancestors appeared from the pitcher (தடவு) of a Northern sage (Agastya), and said to have ruled Thuvarai (Dvārakā) with a fort containing tall huge walls made of bronze. According to a commentary on Tholkappiyam, the earliest long work of Tamil literature, eighteen clans of the Velirs came from the city of Tuvarapati under the leadership of the sage Agastya. The legend goes that all the gods and sages went to the Himalayas to attend the marriage of Siva with Parvati due to which the earth started tilting to one side. Agastya was then requested to proceed south to restore the balance. On his way south, Agastya married Lopamudra and is said to have brought with him sage Jamadagni's son Trnadhumagni or Tholkappiyar, the author of Tamil grammar, and eighteen members of the Vrishni family along with eighteen crore Velir and Aruvalar. It has been suggested by some like Thapar and Champakalakshmi, that the ancestors of the Velir may have been related to the Yadava of Dvaraka and the inhabitants of the post Harappan Chacolithic Black and Red ware sites. According to Thapar, the Yadava may have belonged to a non Indo-Aryan language group. They eventually reached Tamraparni, and as the Velir-Perumakan group, cultivated its ancient society as a political, sociocultural and economic structure in South India and Sri Lanka.

Historian R. Nagaswamy writes that quite a number of these velirs were indigenous and natives of Tamil country but some of the velirs seem to have migrated from dvaraka.

The Irunkōvēl kings trace their lineage to the clan of Krishna; one of the inscriptions at Kodumbalur belonging to one of the kings in the Irunkovel line, namely Tennavan Irunkōvēl. The Moovar Koil record of Irukkuvel chief Boothi Vikramakesari lauds his father, Samarabirama, as Yadu-vamsa-ketu (Banner of the Yadu race). Historians consider the Ay velirs originated from the pastoralists of Ayars and they gained preeminence at an early stage in Tamil history.

== History ==
The Velir were prominent in the Sangam period of Tamil polity, economy, and society. They are traced to the Yadavas (Yadu descent) of Dvaraka and linked up with all important dynasties of South India including the Chalukyas, Hoysalas, and Andhras. In Sangam literature, they are portrayed as independent chieftains who ruled in bordering areas of three major ruling dynasties, had considerable collective power and marriage alliances with Three Crowned Kings. "

- Haihayas
- Kadambas
- Nulambas
- Vaidhumbas
- Dhandakas
- Satavahanas
- Kalachuris
- Pallavas
- Andhras
- Kunthalas
- Dhayanas
- Yadhavas
- Hoysalas
- Rashtrakutas
- Chalukyas
- Banas
- Moryas
- Thondayars

While most of the rulers are substantiated by epigraphs and literatures, some of their history of ruling some dynasties is not recorded.

Also, some of the medieval dynasties of the western half of the peninsula claim to be descended from Yadhavas lineage and the Ay chiefs of Ay dynasty of the ninth century A.D. claim to be the Vrishni-kula as also the Mushika kings who link themselves with Haihaya origins. The Periya Puranam describes about a Haiheya clan king Eyarkon Kalikama Nayanar, he was a Vellalar saint and Commander-in-chief of the Chola army. The Ay velir chieftains, who settled down in Ay county (near Kanyakumari), were quite prominent in Tamil Nadu during the sangam age.

The Chalukyas and Kadambas belonging to Manavya gotra as being the descendants of the original ancestress Hariti. The Karmandala Satakam states that the Velirs of karmandalam belong to the same "Manavya" Gotra. The Chalukya kings were called Velpularasar and Velkulattarasar by some communities, that is kings over Vel country (pula means region or country). Later day references to them in Choļa inscriptions puts the Chalukyas under the Velir community ruling in Deccan.

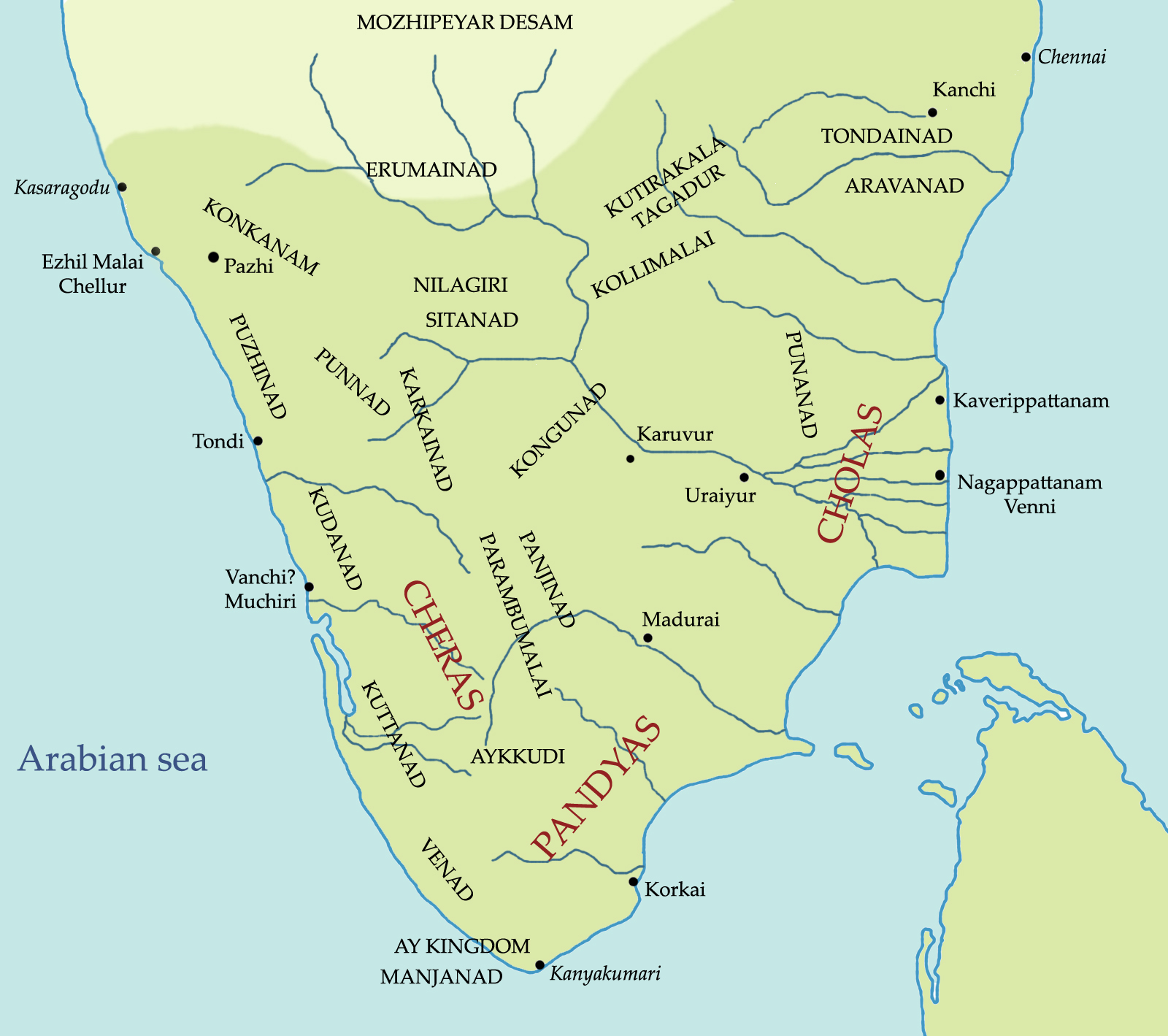
Tamilakam in the Sangam Period

The Ay Vels were one such Velir group that ruled the territory in and around Venad during the Sangam period. The word Venad is derived from Vel -nadu, that is the country ruled by Vel chieftains. We know of a queen of Vikramaditya Varaguna, an Ay king of 9th century who is referred to as Murugan Chenthi and as Aykula Mahadevi from inscriptions. Her father, an Ay chief called Chathan Murugan is described as a Vennir Vellala that is a Vellala by birth, in the Huzur plates of king Karunandakkan, the predecessor of Vikramaditya Varaguna.

The Irunkōvēl lines of Velir kings are considered to be of the same stock as the Hoysalas as in one of the Sangam poems, the ancestor of the Irungovel chieftain is said to have ruled the fortified city of Tuvarai. This city is identified with the Hoysala capital Dwarasamudra by some historians. Also, the legend of the chief killing a tiger (Pulikadimal) has a striking resemblance to the origin legend of the Hoysalas where "sala" kills the tiger to save a sage. As per historian Arokiaswami, the Hoysala title "Ballala" is only a variant of the Tamil word "Vellala". The Hoysala king Veera Ballala III is even now locally known as the "Vellala Maharaja" in Thiruvannamalai, the town that served as their capital in 14th century.

The Irungovel chieftains were related to the Cholas through matrimony. These princes assumed both the Chola and Irungovel titles like for example there was one Adavallan Gangaikonda Cholan alias Irungolan during the time of Kulottunga I and then there was a certain Sendamangalam Udaiyan Araiyan Edirili Cholan alias Irungolan during the reign of Kulottunga III.

Kaluvul was a velir chieftain of Kamur who fought against the chera supremacy. Perum chera irumporai along with fourteen chieftains attacked kamur but perum chera irumporai was impressed with Kaluvuls resistance in battle field and let him rule kamur and accepted friendship from him. Some of the velirs under Kaluvul joined the chera after the defeat.

=== Sangam literature ===
The Purananuru, one of the Eight Anthologies of Sangam literature, praises King Irunkōvēl, a 49th generation descendant of the Vēlir clan whose ancestors appeared from the pitcher (தடவு) of a Northern sage (Agastya), and said to have ruled Thuvarai (Dvārakā) with a fort containing tall huge walls made of bronze.

=== Velir chiefs ===
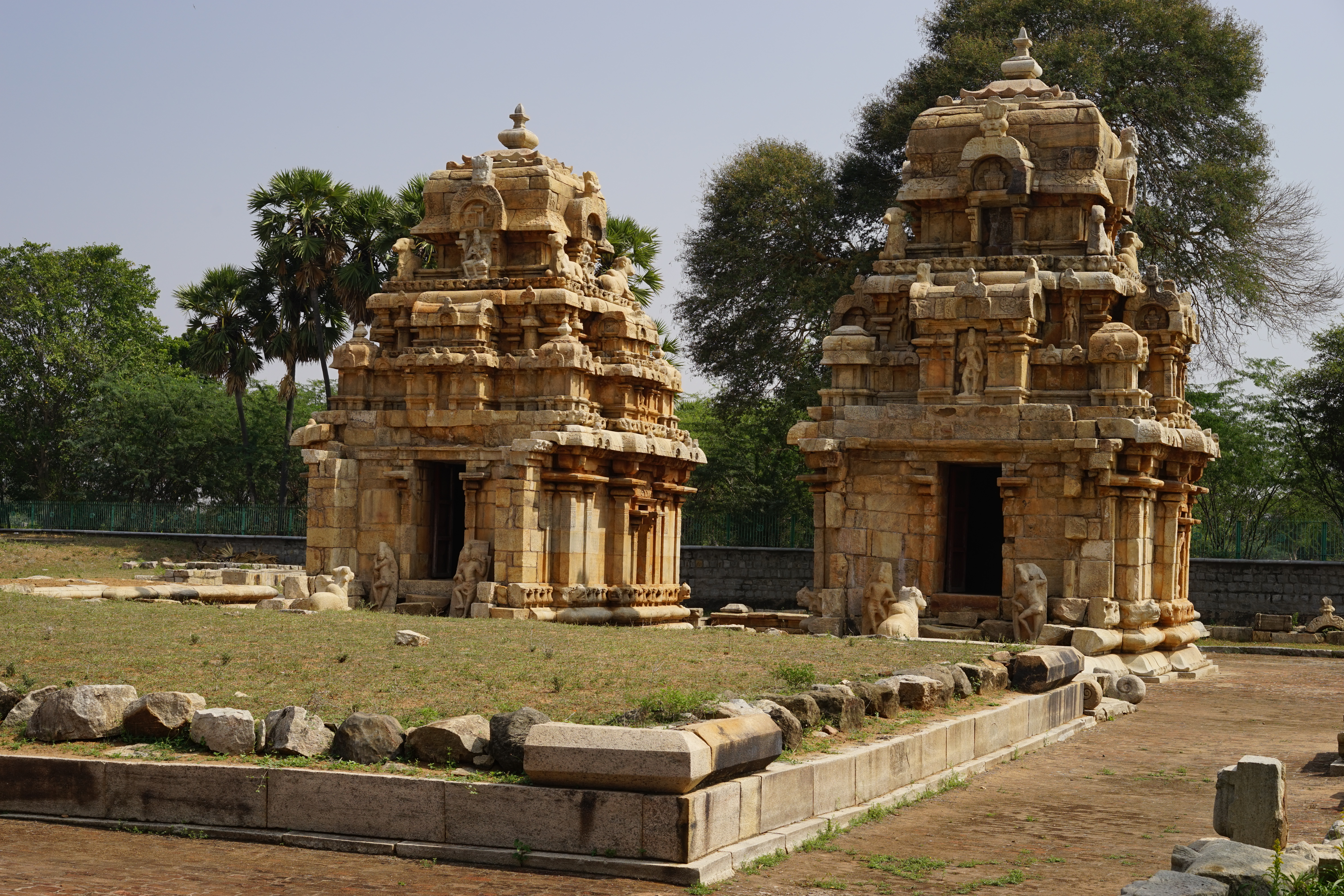
Moovar Koil Temple Complex built by Irunkovel chieftain Boothi Vikramakesari

Athiyamān Nedumān Añci and his son Ezhini, were Athiyamān chieftains, based in Tagadur (present day village located in Dharmapuri district). They were contemporaries of Auvaiyar. The Sangam poem "Thagadur yathirai", now lost, was written about his battle with the Chera king. Another Velir was Irunkōvēl who ruled over Konaadu, the area in and around Pudukottai, with their capital in Kodumbalur. Nannan was another Velir chieftain who hailed from Tulu Nadu. Yet another Velir chief was Pekan of the Vel Avi family who ruled over Pothini, the modern Palani near Madurai. Other ancient Velir chiefs of repute include Alumbil Vel, Alandur Vel, Ilanji Vel and Nangur Vel.

== See also ==
- History of Tamil Nadu
- Ay dynasty
- Agastya
