= Anvarthikanpettai =

- village
- Location in Tamil Nadu, India Anvarthikanpettai (India)
- Coordinates: 13°3′42.468″N 79°33′30.494″E
- Country: India
- State: Tamil Nadu
- District: Ranipettai

Population
  - Total: 1,000

Languages
  - Official: Tamil
- Time zone: UTC+5:30 (IST)
- PIN: 632502
- Telephone code: 04177
- Vehicle registration: TN-73
- Nearest city: Vellore, Chennai
- Lok Sabha constituency: Arakkonam
- Vidhan Sabha constituency: Sholinghur

Anvardhikanpet (or Anvarthikanpettai) is a village in Ranipettai district in the Indian state of Tamil Nadu. It is about 81 kilometres (50 mi) from the state capital, Chennai.

Nearby villages include Mel Aavadham, Keezh Aavadham, Aavadham Pudhupattu, Ramapuram, Minnal, Kunnathur, Melkalathur, Meleri, Kattupakkam and Mahendravadi.

== Nearby towns ==
Arakkonam is about 15 km from the village, whereas one of the six abodes of Hindu God Murugan, Tiruttani is 22 km from here. One of the major towns of Vellore district, Sholinghur is at a proximity of 23 km.

== People and occupation ==
Telugu is widely spoken among the native villagers. Tamil is prevalent among all people who in nearby villages.

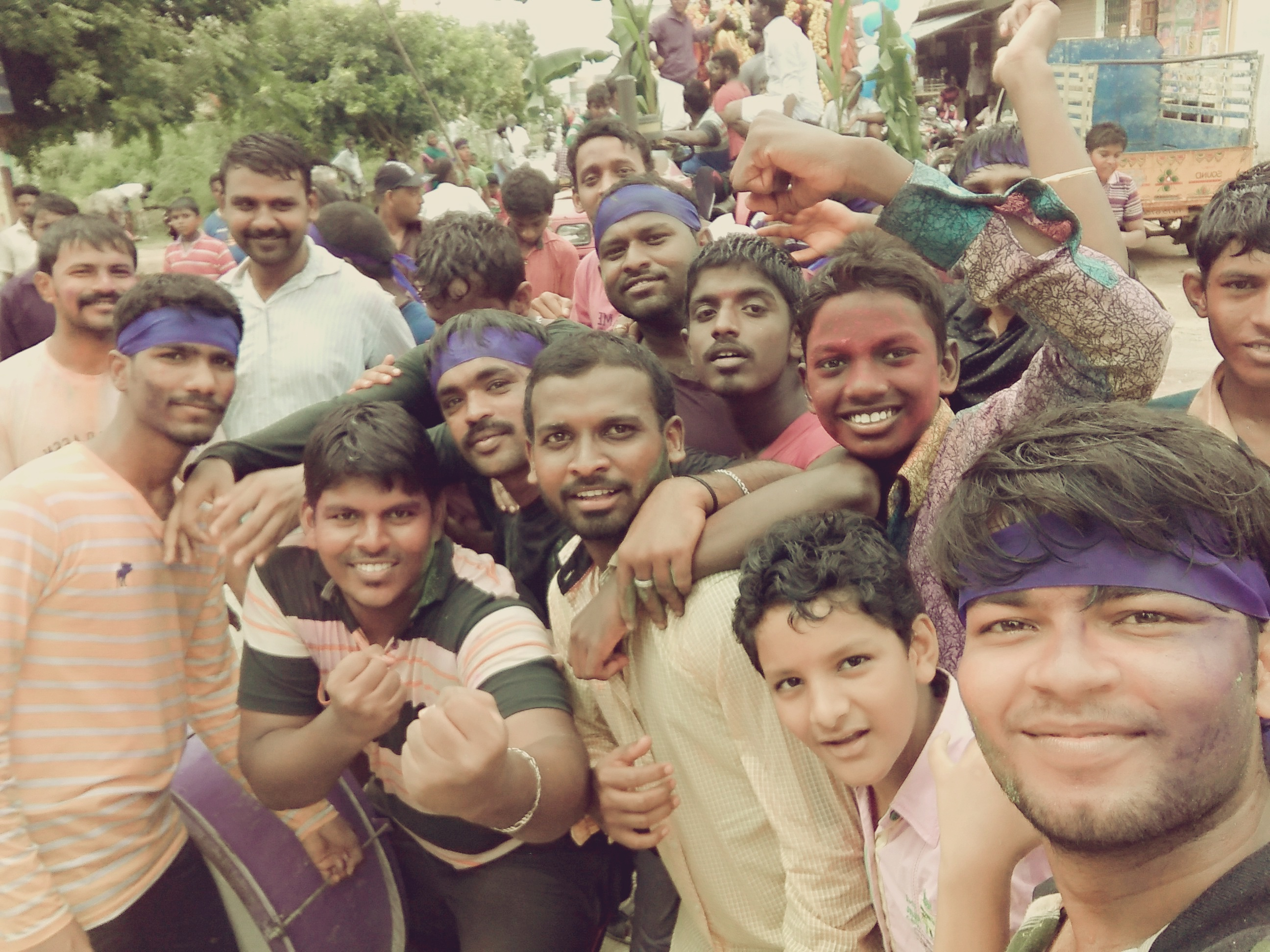
village celebrations

== Education ==
- The Government High School is located in this village.
- "Kilai Noolagam (Library)" is located near bus stop.

== Transport ==
Anvardhikanpet is well-connected by bus to the nearby towns Arakonam and Tiruthani.

This village has a railway station "Anvardhikanpet" at 1 km distance with two tracks (Up Line & Down Line). Yelagiri express and Kaveri Express are important trains in this station. And also some other local trains are running here. It has four streets with a total population of around 1000.
