= Gandaraditya =

Chola emperor from 955 to 956

Gandaraditha Chola
- Rajakesari Varman; Merkey Ezhuntharulina Thevar

Chola emperor
- Reign: 955–956
- Predecessor: Parantaka I
- Successor: Arinjaya
- Empress: Sembiyan Mahadevi; Viranarayaniyar
- Issue: Uttama Chola
- Dynasty: Chola
- Father: Parantaka I
- Religion: Hinduism Jainism

Gandaraditha Chola succeeded his father Parantaka I and became the Chola king about 955. He was also a Tamil literary poet in the Thiruvisaippa Palandu. He had a son named Madurantaka Chola also known as Uttama Chola, who became Chola emperor after his cousin Sundara Chola.

== Turbulent period ==
From the death of Parantaka I, to the accession of Rajaraja I in 985 CE, Chola history is obscure. During this period of 30 years there were five princes who must have occupied the throne. There are several theories surrounding the rapid ascension to the Chola throne.

One was that there were internal feuds among the different members of the royal family. The other is that the effects of the Rashtrakuta invasion, under Krishna III and his brother-in-law Ganga Butuga, and the defeat of the Chola army at Takkolam resulting in the death of heir-apparent Rajaditya Chola (the first in line to the throne - "aanai mael thunjiya devar") must have brought large-scale disorder in the kingdom.

The second theory has more merit since the sons of Parantaka I (specifically Gandaraditya and Arinjaya) must have also fought along with their brother, Rajaditya in that epic battle and must have been variously injured and died rapidly. Thus, Parantaka I was forced to get his grandson Sundara Chola (the son of Arinjaya and probably the oldest surviving prince) to be the heir-apparent.

== Reluctant ruler ==
As noted earlier, the eldest son of Parantaka I, prince Rajaditya lost his life in the Battle of Takkolam (c. 949 CE). Takkalom is identified with the area around present day Arakonam in the North Arcot district. Parantaka I must have made his second son Gandaraditya as heir apparent.

Gandaraditya was a reluctant monarch and focussed more on religious work and not on empire building. The Tondaimandalam continued to be occupied by the Rashtrakutas and Gandaratitya did not seem to have made any attempt to retrieve it. It is not clear if this is because he was uninterested in war or that he was assimilating his position south of the Paalar River and cutting his losses to keep Eelam (which was fast slipping out of Chola control) and to keep a resurgent Pandya Kingdom at bay.

For the time being, the martial Chola power seemed to have been toned down but trade (especially maritime) continued to flourish. There are only very few inscriptions to be found that could be directly attributed to him and this may be because earlier inscriptions were consciously deleted by later Uttama Chola who undertook the task of converting South Indian temples into granite from brick-and-mortar under the "Kalpani" scheme. The conscious decision by Uttama Chola is mentioned in his inscriptions at Kanchipuram.

He spent more time in religious discourse. He is credited with writing a Tamil hymn on Siva of the Chidambaram Temple.

== Co-regent ==
Very early in his reign Gandharaditya must have made his younger brother Arinjaya co-regent and heir-apparent. It is possible that Gandaradhitya was without issue for a long time and in attempt to secure the continuation of the Vijayalaya dynasty, Gandharaditya made his brother heir apparent.

== Personal life ==
Gandaraditya had two queens namely Sembiyan Mahadevi, described as the daughter of Mazhavarayar and another called Viranarayaniyar who is described as the daughter of Solamadeviyar. Sembiyan Madeviyar bore him a son called Madhurantaka Uttama Chola. This must have been very late in his life. At the time of Gandaraditya’s death (c. 956 CE), Uttama Chola must have been a young boy, as he was set aside in the order of succession and Arinjaya took over the Chola crown. Sembiyan Madeviyar survived her husband for a long time. She seems to have been a pious lady as she figures in several inscriptions, making donations to various temples. She died c. 1001 CE during Rajaraja’s reign. She was the daughter of Mazhavarayar clan chieftain and is described thus in inscriptions.

Gandaraditya was also known as "Merkey elundarulina devar" - the king who rose in the west, that is who went west and attained salvation. The meaning of this phrase is not clearly understood but could possibly mean the king who went west to Kerala. There are claims that Gandaraditya in his later life adapted the Jain faith and went to the Kannada land in the west of the Chola country with a Jain ascetic named Loka-pala acharya. A inscription in the form of a poem at Andimalai jain caves mentions that a local chieftain, Siddhavadavan alias Sethirayan, donated Panaipadi village for the worship of the Jaina tirthankaras during the second regnal year (952 A.D.) of Chola king Gandaraditya.

== Contributions to Tamil literature ==
It has been widely accepted by researchers of Tamil literature and Saiva religious scholars that Gandaraditya was the author of a Thiruvisaippa on Siva at the Temple of Chidambaram. In this there is a distinct statement that Parantaka I conquered the Pandya country and Eelam (Sri Lanka) and covered the temple of Nataraja with gold. Gandaraditya composed eleven poems on Lord Nataraja of Chidambaram. These are part of the ninth volume of the Tirumurai and are called Tiruvisaippa. He refers to himself as "Koli(Kozhi) Vendan Thanjaiyar Kon Gandaradittan" in these poems. It is not clear when he composed this poetry and whether it was he who covered the Chidambaram shrine in lieu of his father, or if it was done at Parantaka I's term.

== Notes ==
Preceded by Parantaka Chola I	Chola; 950–957 CE	Succeeded by Arinjaya Chola
