= Yelagiri Express =

Train in India

Overview
- Service type: Express
- Locale: Tamil Nadu
- Current operator: Southern Railways

Route
- Termini: MGR Chennai Central (MAS); Jolarpettai Junction (JTJ)
- Stops: 15
- Distance travelled: 214 km (133 mi)
- Average journey time: 4 hours 35 minutes
- Service frequency: Daily
- Train number: 16089 / 16090

On-board services
- Classes: AC Chair Car, Second Class Seating, General Unreserved
- Seating arrangements: Yes
- Sleeping arrangements: No
- Auto-rack arrangements: Overhead racks
- Catering facilities: Not available
- Observation facilities: Large windows
- Baggage facilities: No
- Other facilities: Below the seats

Technical
- Rolling stock: LHB coach
- Track gauge: 1,676 mm (5 ft 6 in)
- Operating speed: 47 km/h (29 mph) average including halts.

The 16089 / 16090 Yelagiri Express is a daily express train which runs between Jolarpettai and Chennai. The train stops at Vaniyambadi, Ambur, Melpadi, Valathoor, Gudiyattam, Katpadi Junction, Mukundarayapuram, Walajah Road, Sholingur, Anavardikanpettai, Chitteri, Arakkonam Junction, Thiruvallur, Perambur and MGR Chennai Central.

== Relevance ==
This train traces its name to the Yelagiri hills near Jolarpettai. Jolarpettai is at the foothills of Yelagiri.

[Once before 2013 it runs from Tiruppathur to mgr chennai central.

After 2013 it announced to run from Jolarpettai(JTJ) to Mgr chennai central (MAS)].

The regional people and regular passengers call it as JP (JP-Jolarpet)

This train carries average of 3k to 5k peoples daily express, There was a Huge attachment between passengers and train.

== Composition ==
The train is usually hauled by a powerful Arakkonam WAP4 locomotive or Royapuram WAP 7 . As the train completes its to-fro journey in a single day, The train has 24 coaches. The coaches include 20 General second class, 1 First class, 2 luggage cum-brake van coaches. First 3 and Last 3 compartments are dedicated ladies coaches.

== Service ==
Even though it is classified as Express, this train stops in many stations but not all, which can accelerate and decelerate the 24 carriage train between frequent stoppages. The train arrives Chennai Central by 9:10 and departs by 17:55 which helps the passengers to attend their work everyday even from a distant home.
