= Boothi Vikramakesari =

- Commander of the Chola Empire
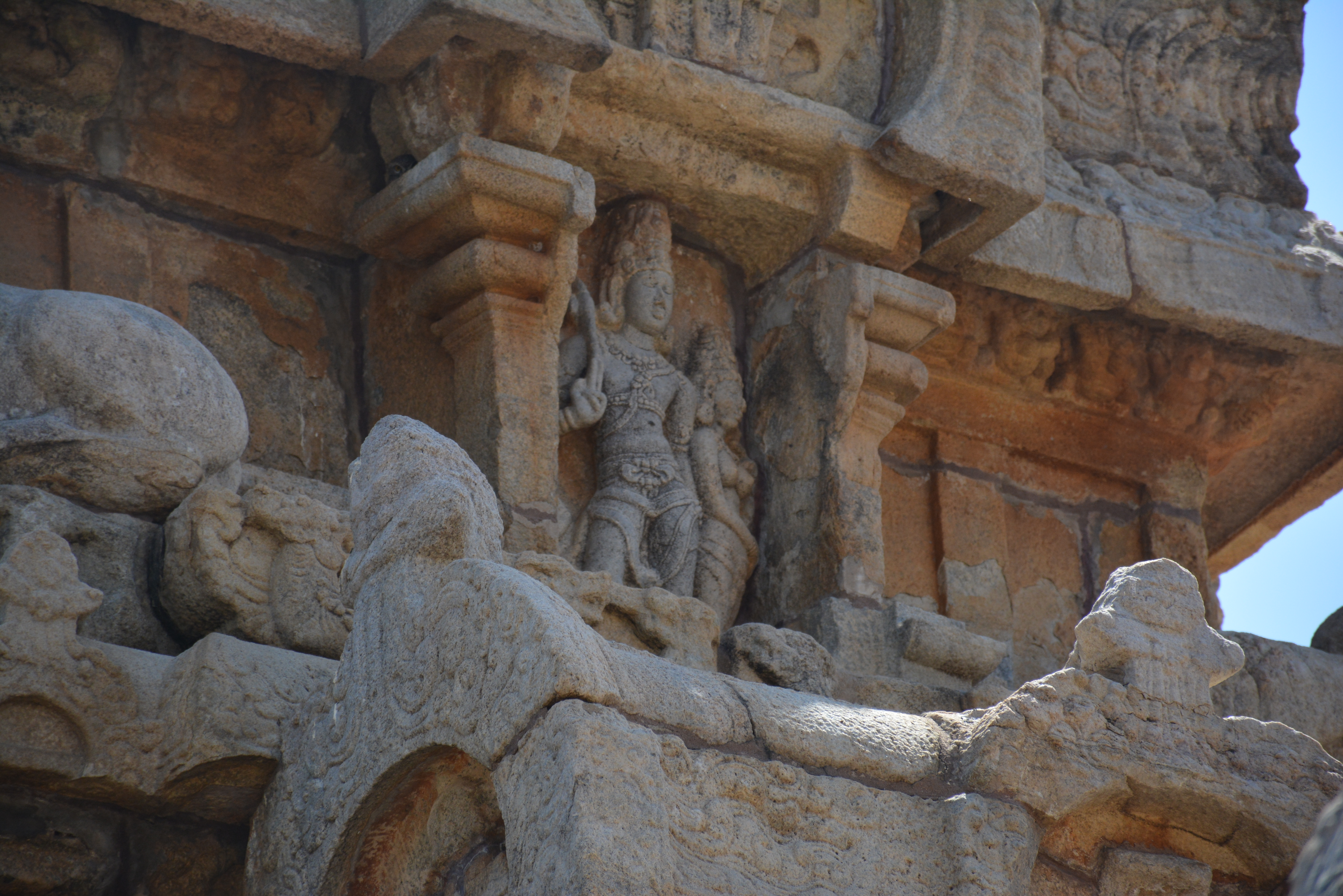
- Sculpture on the wall of Moovar Koil
- Emperor: Parantaka II
- Born: Kodumbalur, Chola Empire (Modern day Tamil Nadu, India)
- Died: Kodumbalur, Chola Empire (Modern day Tamil Nadu, India)
- Spouse: Karrali; Varaguna
- Issue: Boothi Aditya Pidaari
- House: Irunkovel (father's side); Chola (Mother's side)
- Father: Samarabirama
- Mother: Anupama

Boothi Vikramakesari was a Velir Irukkuvel commander of the Chola Empire during Sundara Chola's reign. He is best remembered for building the Moovar Koil temple complex, a collection of three temples in the village of Kodumbalur, 36 kilometres from Pudukkottai in Tamil Nadu, India. His family was related to the Cholas by marriage. His mother was Chola princess Anupama, the daughter of Parantaka I, while his father was Samarabirama who belonged to the Velir clan.

Boothi Vikramakesari was a Velir chieftain and a feudatory of Parantaka II. He succeeded his father as the Irunkovel king of Kodumbalur. He was related to the Cholas by his mother side, as he was the son of Chola princess Anupama, the daughter of Parantaka I. He raised some military conquests during Sundara Chola's reign. His exact period is still unknown, but can be fixed in the second half of the 10th century.

== Personal life ==
The chief's given name was Boothi and he earned the title Vikramakesari through his exploits. He is also called as Tennavan Ilangovel and Parantaka Ilangovelir in inscriptions. He was born to Irukkuvel chieftain Samarabirama and Chola princess Anupama. Samarabirama is called 'Yadu Vamsa Kethu', which means 'The Banner of the Yadu Race' in the Moovar Koil inscription. Two queens of his are known from the same inscription, namely, Nangai Varaguna Perumanar and Karrali.

== Inscriptions ==
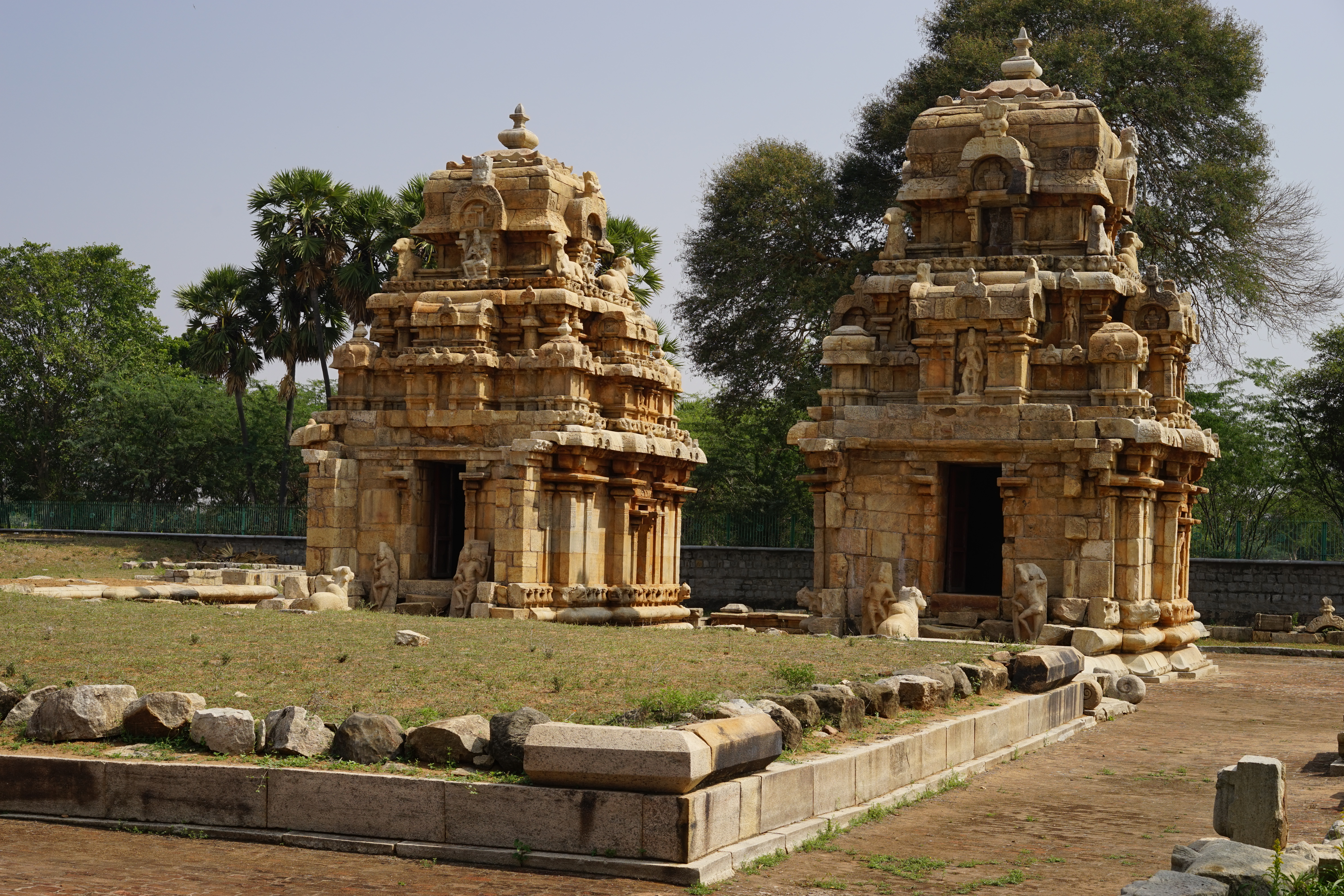
Moovar Koil Temple

An excerpt of the Moovar Koil inscription is as follows,

9.ndadhaN śramānvikramakesarīti samare labdhānyanāmā nṛpaḥ ௳ kāverī-

10. vāri śoṇaṃ samakṛta rudhiraiḥ pallavasya dhvajinyāḥ yo vīroḥ

11. vīrapāṇḍyaṃ vyajayata samare vañciveḷantako bhūT ௳ mattāri sāmajā-

12. hatvā vasanvikramakesarī koṭuṃ pāḷūppurādīndramābikāvivarodare ௳-

13. vidvatkalpatarau kṣītīśvarakaradvadvāMbujendau bhuvaṃ yasmiN śāsati"

"Bhūti, who by his prowess in battle obtained the title Vikramakēsari, is said to have made the waters of the Kāvēri red with the blood of the Pallava army slain by him. He also conquered Vīrapāṇḍya in battle and destroyed one Vañci-Vēl.”

— South Indian Inscriptions, Volume XXIII,

.. there was (called) Anupama (meaning peerless), (who) was literally true to her name, a daughter of the Chola king, and a beloved of this Yadu Vamsa Kethu (Banner of the Yadu Race, that is Samarabirama)

Of her was born to him the glorious king called Bhuti otherwise called Minnamala Vikramakesari (the Lion of Valour).

Another inscription from the period of Pallava King Ko-vijaya-Nandivikramavarman from Kilur, Tirukovilur taluk, South Arcot district. The script and language of the inscription is in Tamil and paleographically the inscription can be dated to the 9th century,

..the inscription is dated in the sixteenth year of the Ko Vijaya Nandivikramavarman and records the gift by Maravan Pudi alias Tennavan Ilangovelar. The gift consisted of 24 kalanju of pure gold weighed by videlvidigu, the standard stone, out of the interest of which the Nagarattar of Tirukkovalur undertook to supply ghee for burning a lamp.

The following is another inscription from Ghrithasthaneswara temple in Tillasthanam, figuring the queen of Boothi Vikramakesari from the period of Aditya I,

(Line 1) Hail Prosperity, in the 13th year of the reign of King Rajakesarivarman, Tennavan Pirudimarsan alias Katti Orri-uran gave 25 kalanju of gold for burning one perpetual lamp with (one) ulakku of ghee every day the (god) Mahadeva (Siva) at Tiruneyttanam which was a devadana in Poygainadu; and Varaguna Perumanar the queen(deviyar) of Parantaka Ilangovelar gave 25 kalanju of gold for one perpetual lamp. With this total of 50 kalanju of gold (some) lands of the god were cleared of its borders and mounds and were converted into a wet field. The boundaries of (the reclaimed) these lands are:-..

(L 7) West of the cultivated land of the (god) Vishnu Bhattaraka (lying to) the east of the border; north of the embankment called Karikala-karai; east of the karay dry lands of the god; south of the (channel called) Andanur-vaykkal.

Among the boundaries mentioned in the above inscription there is an embankment called Karikala-karai.
