= Twin Temples, Keezhaiyur =

Coordinates: 11°02′33″N 79°02′27″E

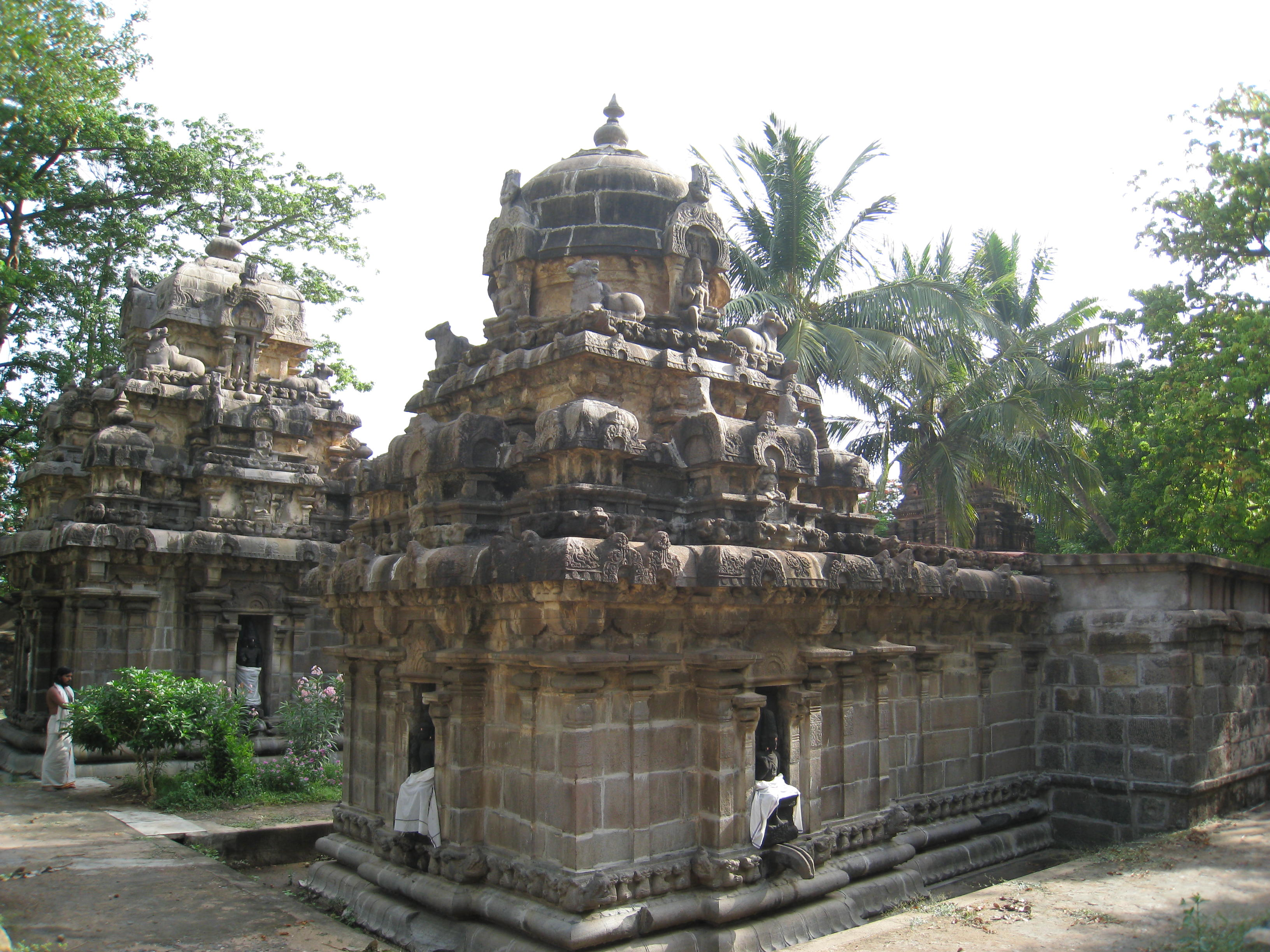
Twin temples, Keezhaiyur, built by Paluvettaraiyar chieftains Kumaran and Kumaran Kandan in the 9th century AD

The Twin Temples at Keezhaiyur is a 9th-century temple complex built by the Paluvettaraiyar chieftains who were vassals of the Medieval Cholas at Keezhaiyur on the Trichy-Ariyalur highway.

== Architecture ==
As the name suggests, the complex consists of two temples. The temple in the north is called Vadavaayil Sirikoil or Chozheecharam and the one in the south is called Thenvaaayil Sirikoil or Agatheeswaram. The temples were constructed by the Paluvettaraiyar chieftains Kumaran Maravan and Kumaran Kandan.

== Gallery ==
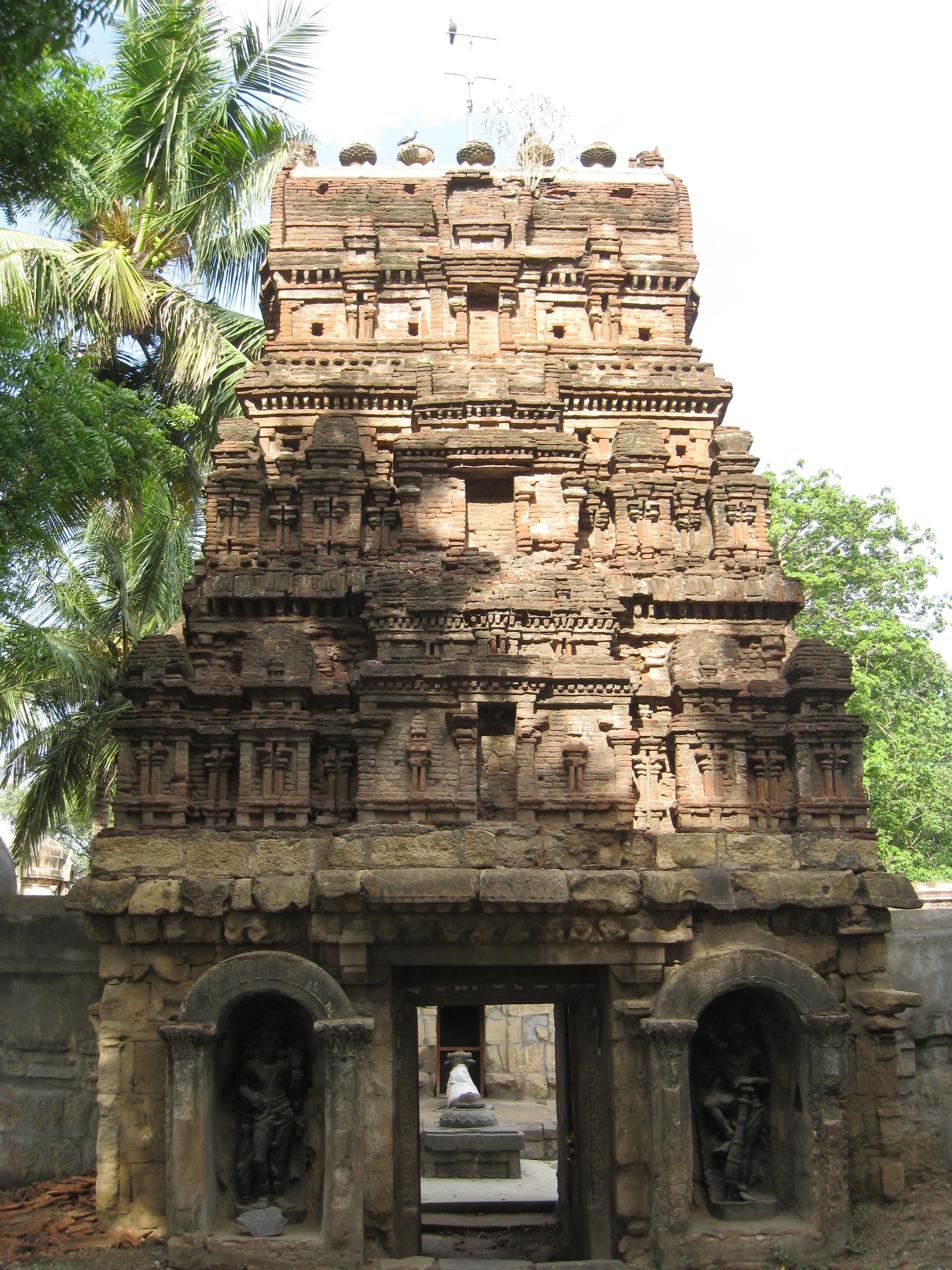
Entrance

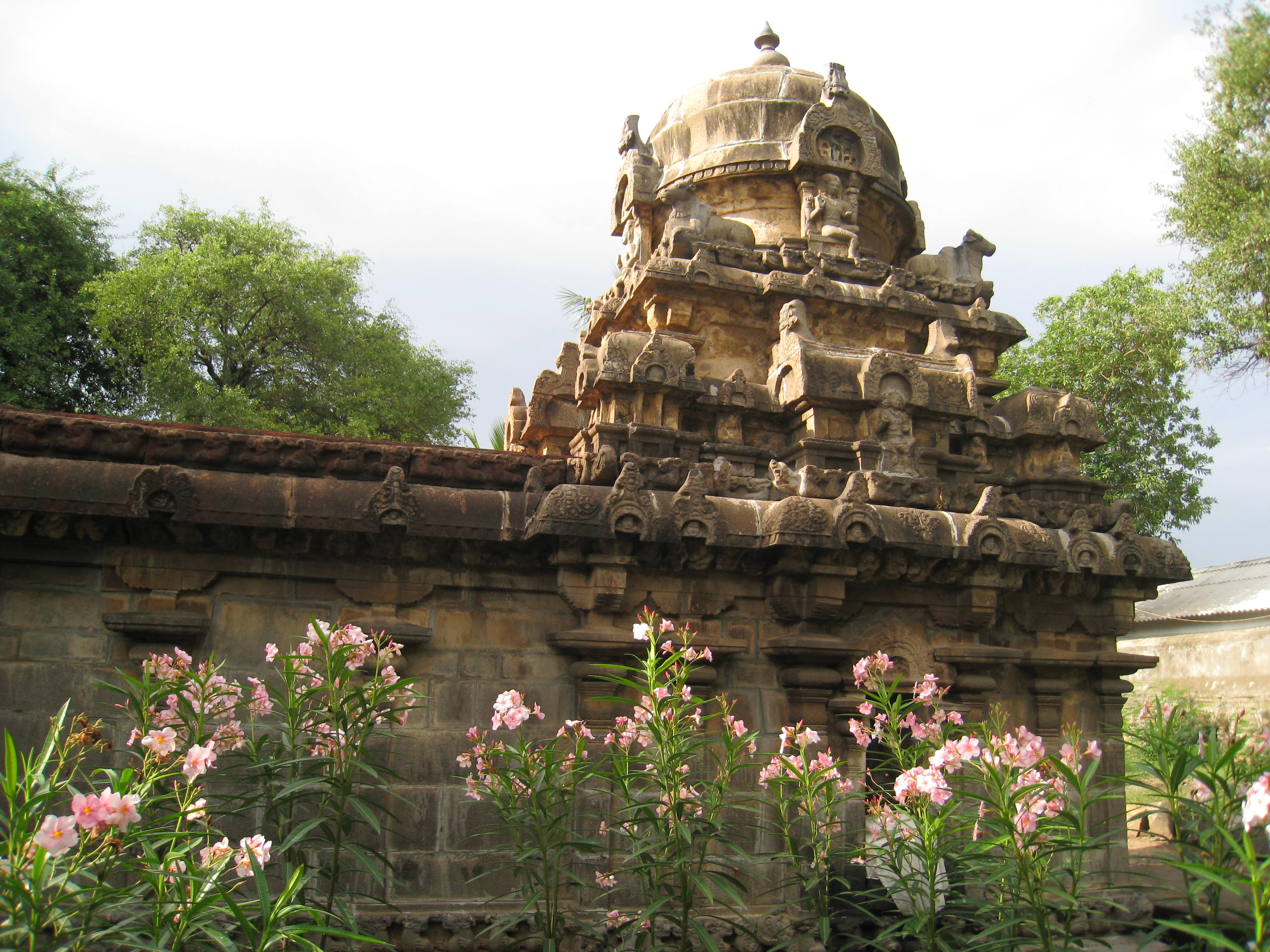
Temple 1

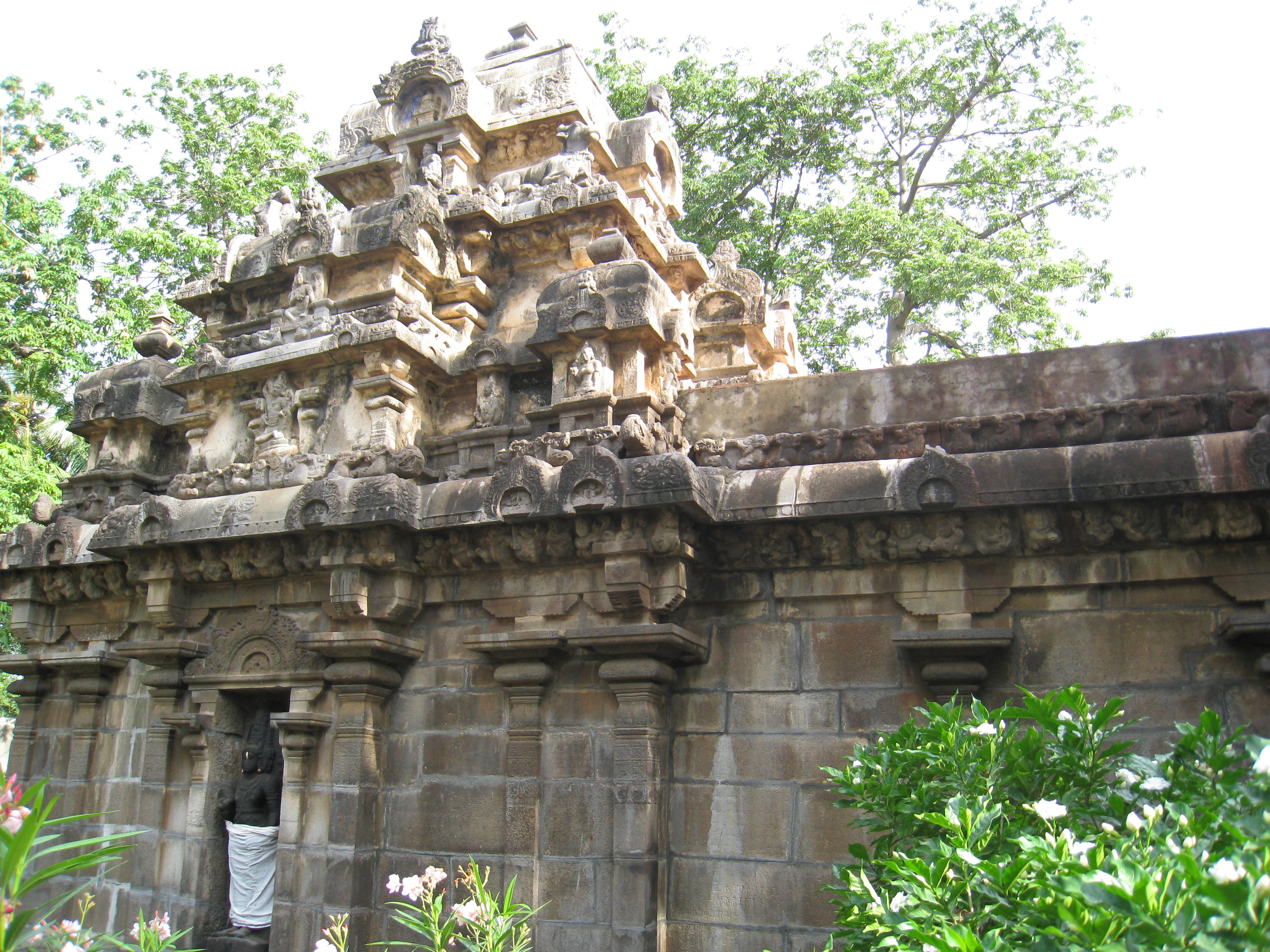
Temple 2

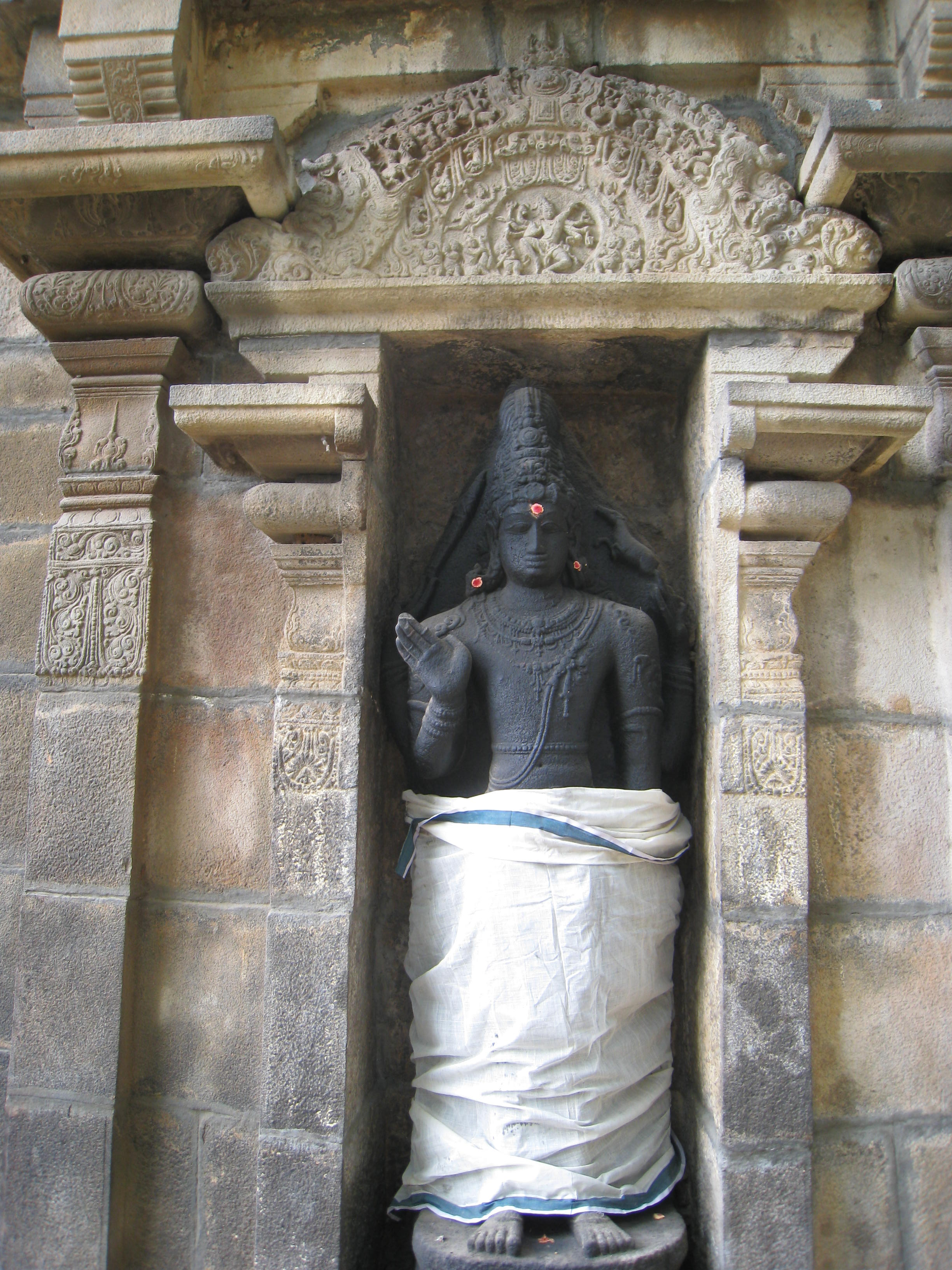
Sculpture

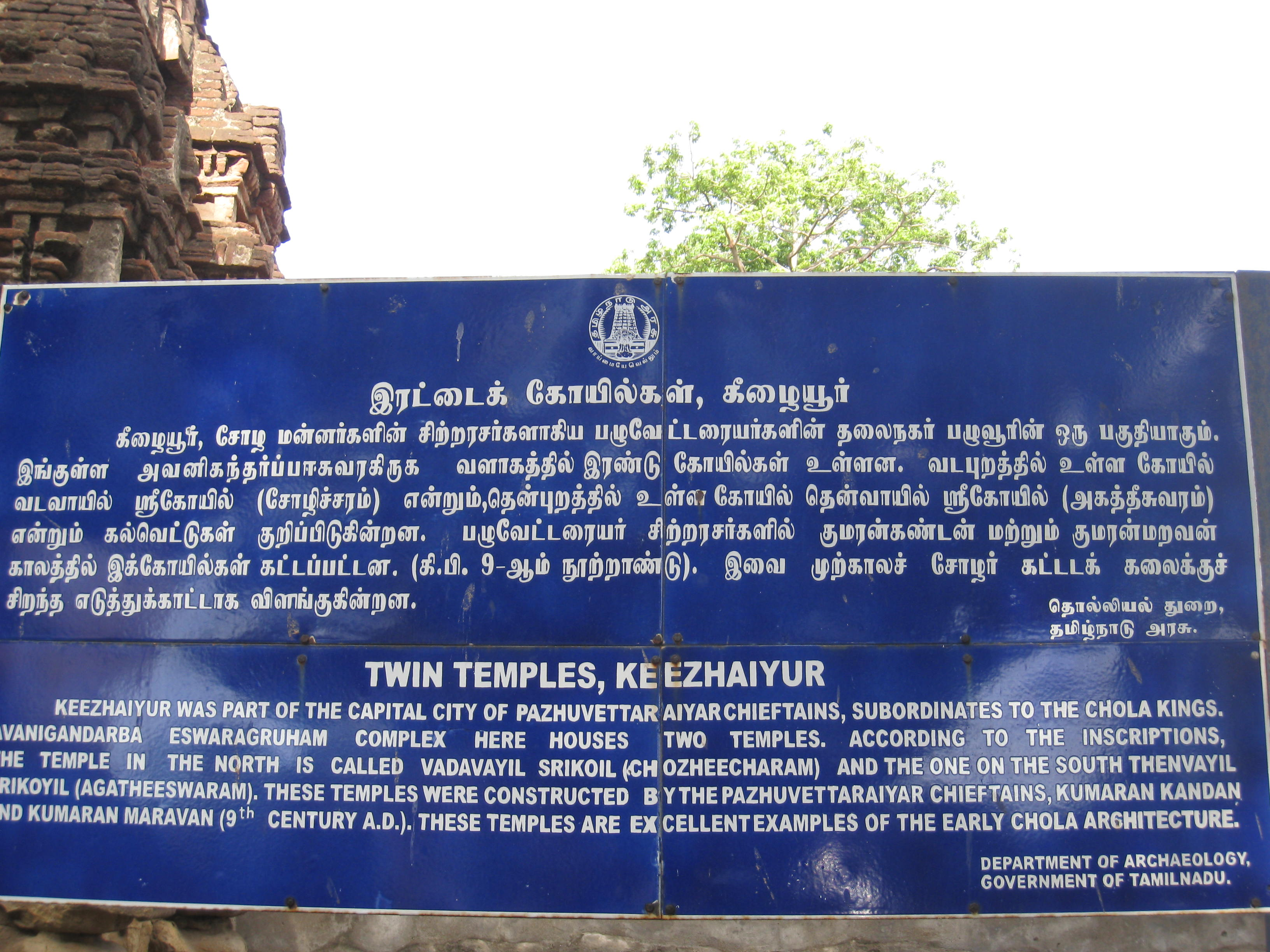
ASI Information Board

== See also ==
- Paluvettaraiyar
- Chola
