= Vidhya Subramanian =

Indian Bharatanatyam Dancer

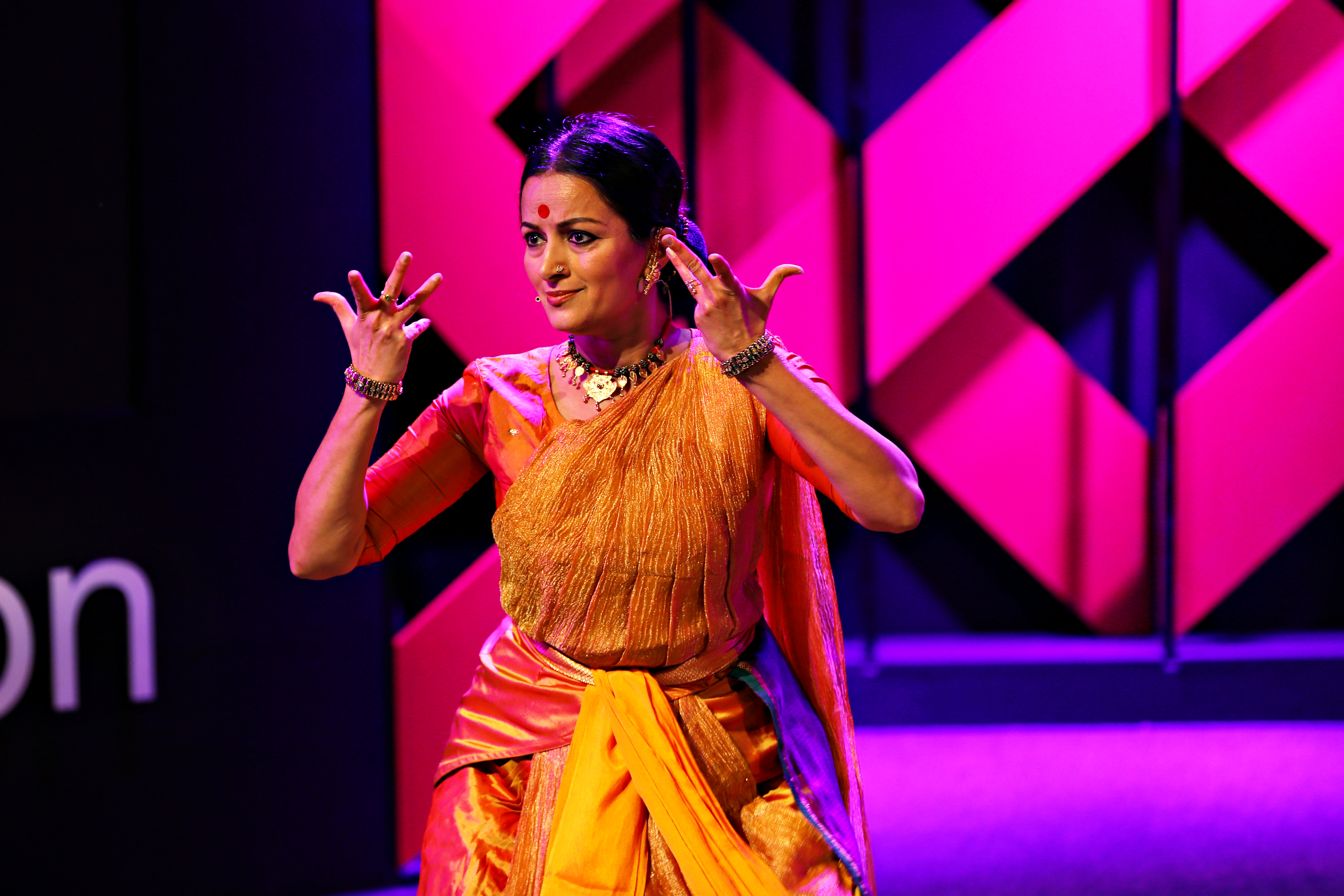
Vidhya Subramanian at TEDxGateway 2019

Vidhya Subramanian is a Bharatanatyam dancer, choreographer, actress and teacher recognized for her expertise in the Vazhuvoor style. She played role of Vaanavan Maadevi in Tamil films Ponniyin Selvan: I (2022) and Ponniyin Selvan: II (2023).

== Biography ==
Vidhya Subramanian was born in Chennai and began learning Bharatanatyam at a young age. She trained under S. K. Rajarathnam and Abhinaya exponent Padmabhushan Kalanidhi Narayanan. She made her debut (Arangetram) in 1984, and subsequently performed across India and internationally.

After moving to the United States in 1990, she founded the Lasya Dance Company in California.

As a choreographer, she has created productions that explore cultural and social themes, including female empowerment and patriarchal structures. In addition to solo performances, she has worked as a mentor and artistic director, contributing to the development of students and ensemble works.

== Awards ==
Vidhya Subramanian is a recipient of the Nrithya Choodamani award from Krishna Gana Sabha, Chennai.

She is also the recipient of awards such as Nadanamamani from Karthik Fine Arts, Chennai and Yuva Kala Bharati from Bharat Kalachar, Chennai.
