= Ilanji Vel =

Ilanji Vel was one of the velirs of the ancient Tamilakam. He ruled a territory called Ilanji, near Courtallam. He belonged to the clan of the Pandyas.
