= Valathoor =

- Village
- Location in Tamil Nadu, India Valathoor (India)
- Coordinates: 12°53′23.50″N 78°50′21.89″E
- Country: India
- State: Tamil Nadu
- District: Vellore
- Established: President

Government
  - Type: Valathoor Panchayat Presidents: Arumugam(1986-1991) S.Nirmala Settu (1996-2001) S.Prabavathi Sekaran (2001-2006) Aruldhas (2006-2011) Pushpa (2016-2021) S.Nirmala Settu (2021-present)
  - Body: President

Population
  - Total: 15,000

Languages
  - Official: Tamil, Urdu, Kannada, Telugu and Hindi
- Time zone: UTC+5:30 (IST)
- PIN: 635813
- Telephone code: 04171
- Vehicle registration: TN23

Valathoor is a village about 8 kilometres (5 mi) from the town of Gudiyatham in Vellore District, Tamil Nadu, India. There is a railway station about 1 kilometre (1 mi) from the village near Ulli, with the village's name. This station is located in the Katpadi–Jolarpet mainline. There are trains to Bangalore (via Jolarpet) and Chennai (via Arakonam). The nearest town is Madanur, on the Chennai — Bengaluru Highway, which is about 2.5 kilometres (2 mi) from Valathoor.

There are Two sub villages (Rasampatti and varadhapalayam) in Valathoor Panchayat.

There is Lake "Valathoor Lake" which gets the water source from Palaru (from Madhanur). There is a temple at the lake side called Kaliyamman Temple, and four mosques and four churches are there. There is Government Higher Secondary School which has more than 500 students and three government Elementary Schools in Valathoor and also a madarasa and a Government Aided Elementary School.

There were five tanneries in this village since 1920. In 1996 these tanneries were closed for not providing Effluent Treatment Plants as per Tamilnadu Pollution Control Board directives. In 2009, SAS shoe company is Started by TV.Segaren." and in 2011 The Gopi Engineering Works had launched. This village is one of the victims of the leather tanneries water pollution. The ground water was polluted and from 2011 onwards, the Valathoor Lake is polluted from the leather tanneries effluent water via the Palar river.
