= Melpadi =

- town
- Location in Tamil Nadu, India
- Coordinates: 13°4′N 79°17′E
- Country: India
- State: Tamil Nadu
- District: Vellore

Languages
  - Official: Tamil
- Time zone: UTC+5:30 (IST)
- Vehicle registration: TN-23
- Nearest city: Ponnai
- Lok Sabha constituency: Arakkonam Lok Sabha constituency

Melpadi is an ancient small town in Vellore district in the Indian state of Tamil Nadu. It is on the western bank of Ponnai near the Palar River. It is located near Thiruvalam, 7 km from Ponnai.

Melpadi was a buffer state between the Chalukya and Chola dynasties. Raja Raja Chola's grandfather died there. Choleeswara of Arinjaya Chola was built by Raja Raja Chola along with Somanatheeswarar temple in Melpadi.

The Karhad plates no XXV issued from the king's camp stationed at Melpadi, mentions that Krishna III also undertook one of the earliest but extensive military conquest against the Chola ruler of Tanjore, who had supplanted the Pallavas of Kanchi.

During the Sangam period the place was under the classification of "Mullai" land. Melpadi means "village on the western bank of the river".

The nearby village of Vinaygapuram hosts Vinayagar temple.

During the Pallvas it was called Tunadu under Vanagopadi.

It is an agricultural town where the investment grains produced consist of rice, peanuts, and peanut oil. The town produced the "Kechilisamba" variety of rice grain. The peanut oil produced here has an aroma and low viscosity.

The town has its own post office, library, police station and local panchayat. There is Droupadi Amman Temple near Melpadi.

Initially the town had two long streets set parallel to each other. Because the town is located very close to the Pallar River the wide mouth wells had a constant supply of water and were utilized for agriculture. Prior to electricity and motorized pumps, bullock carts were utilized to raise water from the wells and for ploughing. Most of the landowners hired farmhands for agricultural labor. As years passed by the landowners donated the lands to these farmhands as a gesture of gratitude and service for several generations. The town claims lot of pride due to their tradition for giving generously along the same lines as "chola dynasty".
