= Paluvettaraiyar =

Feudatories in the Chola dynasty

Pazhuvettaraiyar
- Feudatory rulers
- Country: Chola Empire

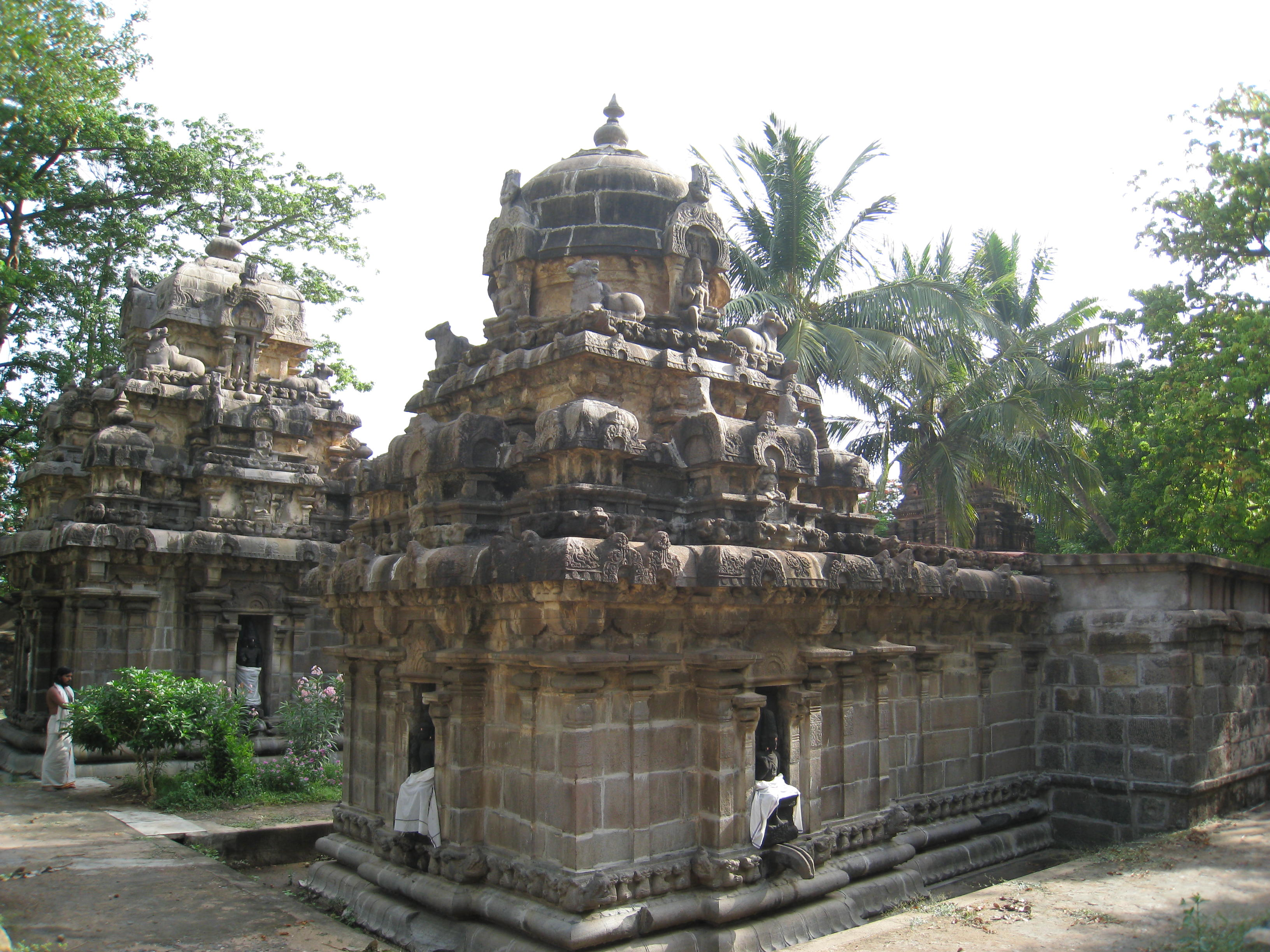
Twin Temples, Keezhaiyur

The Pazhuvettaraiyar were one of the feudatories of the medieval Cholas in southern India. They ruled over the regions of Kizha-Pazhuvur, Mela-Pazhuvur and Keezhaiyur in the Ariyalur taluk of the Ariyalur district in present-day Tamil Nadu.

They contributed significantly to the local temples through various benefactions and were known to have been related to the imperial Cholas by marriage.

== Origins ==
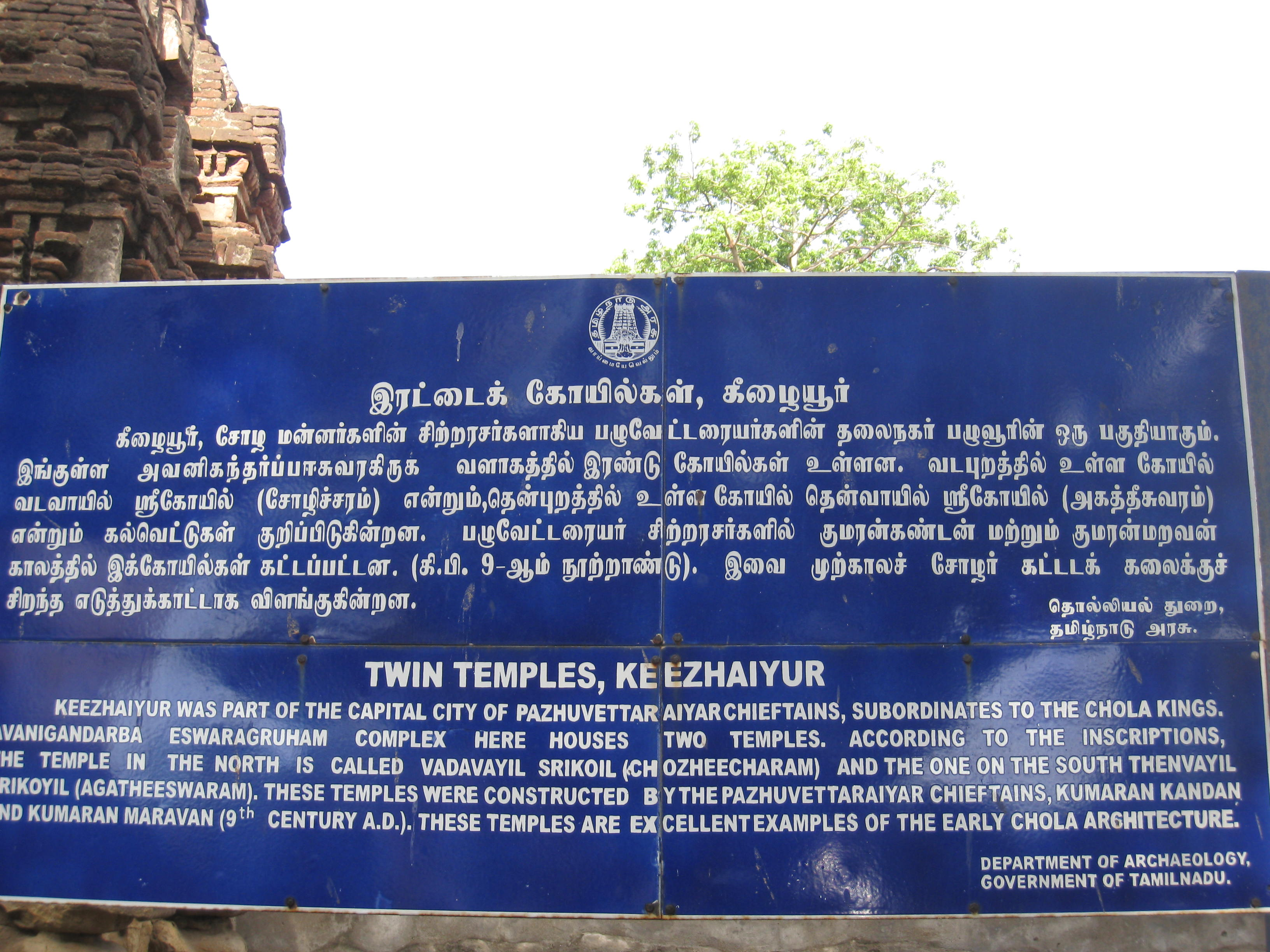
ASI Information Board, Twin Temples, Keezhaiyur.

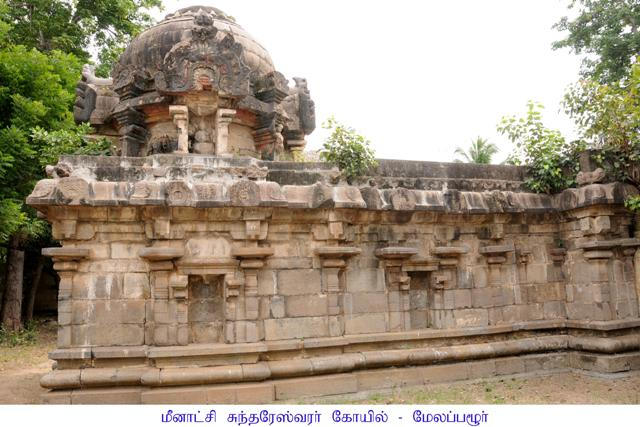
Pazhuvettaraiyar temple in Mela-Pazhuvur, Ariyalur.

According to the Anbil Plates of Sundara Chola, his paternal grandmother—the queen of Parantaka I and the mother of Arinjaya—was a member of the Pazhuvettaraiyar family. She is described as the daughter of a "Chera mandala" prince called "Pazhuvettaraiyar". This suggests that the Pazhuvettaraiyar were of Chera or Kerala origin.

However, it is unclear whether they already possessed the regions of Kizha-Pazhuvur, Mela-Pazhuvur, and Keezhaiyur or if these dominions were granted to them after their alliance with the Cholas.

== Epigraphical records ==
About a dozen inscriptional records related to the Pazhuvettaraiyar family have been found. According to these inscriptions, copied at Kizha-Pazhuvur and Mela-Pazhuvur in Tiruchirapalli district, the Pazhuvettaraiyar was a Chera or Kerala prince.

According to the Anbil Plates of Sundara Chola, the queen of Parantaka I (and the mother of Arinjaya) was a member of the Pazhuvettaraiyar family. She is described as the daughter of a "Chera mandala" prince called "Pazhuvettaraiyar". A record dated to the 12th regnal year of the Chola ruler Parantaka I (A.R. No. 231 of 1926) states that certain Pazhuvettaraiyar named Kandan Amudanar fought a victorious battle at Vellur on behalf of his Chola overlord against the forces of the Pandya king and his Ceylonese ally, in which the Pandya ruler lost his life. To commemorate this victory, the Chola commander Nakkan Sattan of Paradur made a gift of a perpetual lamp to the temple of Tiruvalandurai-Mahadeva at Siru-Pazhuvur. It is likely that this "Kandan Amudanar" is the same individual mentioned in the Anbil Plates of Sundara Chola as the Kerala prince whose daughter married Parantaka I and became the mother of prince Arinjaya. The term "Kerala prince" probably indicates that he was a relative of the Chera or Kerala king.

Other notable chiefs from the Pazhuvettaraiyar family include Kumaran Maravan and Kumaran Kandan. They are credited with building the Twin Temples of Keezhaiyur.

It is also recorded that the Pazhuvettaraiyar regiment was a military division involved in the Chola invasion of Sri Lanka in the 10th century.

== See also ==
- Chola
