= Gowtham =

Gowtham is a given name and a surname. Notable people with the name include:

- Krishnappa Gowtham, Indian cricketer
- Gowtham Sundararajan, Indian actor and choreographer
