= Koliyar =

Regions with significant populations
- Tamil Nadu, India

Languages
- Tamil

Religion
- Hinduism

Related ethnic groups
- Tamil people

Koliyar is one of the artisan castes of the ancient Tamil society. They are a community of weavers who were regularly mentioned in medieval Tamil inscriptions. They were classified together with the Taccar (carpenters, stonemasons etc.), Kollar, and Tattar as constituting the Kilkalanai group. According to historian K.V Subrahmanya Iyer, this term referred to the Sanskrit Anuloma.

== History ==
They seem to have been a powerful and influential group during the period of the Cholas as we find many sovereigns assuming titles such as Koliyar-Ko (King of Koliyar), Koliyar-Kula-pati (head of Koliyar), etc. so much so that historians sometimes use the term Koliyar as a synonym for the Cholas.

It is of interest to note that Uraiyur, the early Chola capital was also known as Koliyur. Though it is generally presumed to be named after the City of fowl or cock, it perhaps takes its name after this once popular community.

== See also ==
- Sengunthar
- Solar dynasty
- Koliya
- Kori caste
- Koli people
