= Moovar Koil =

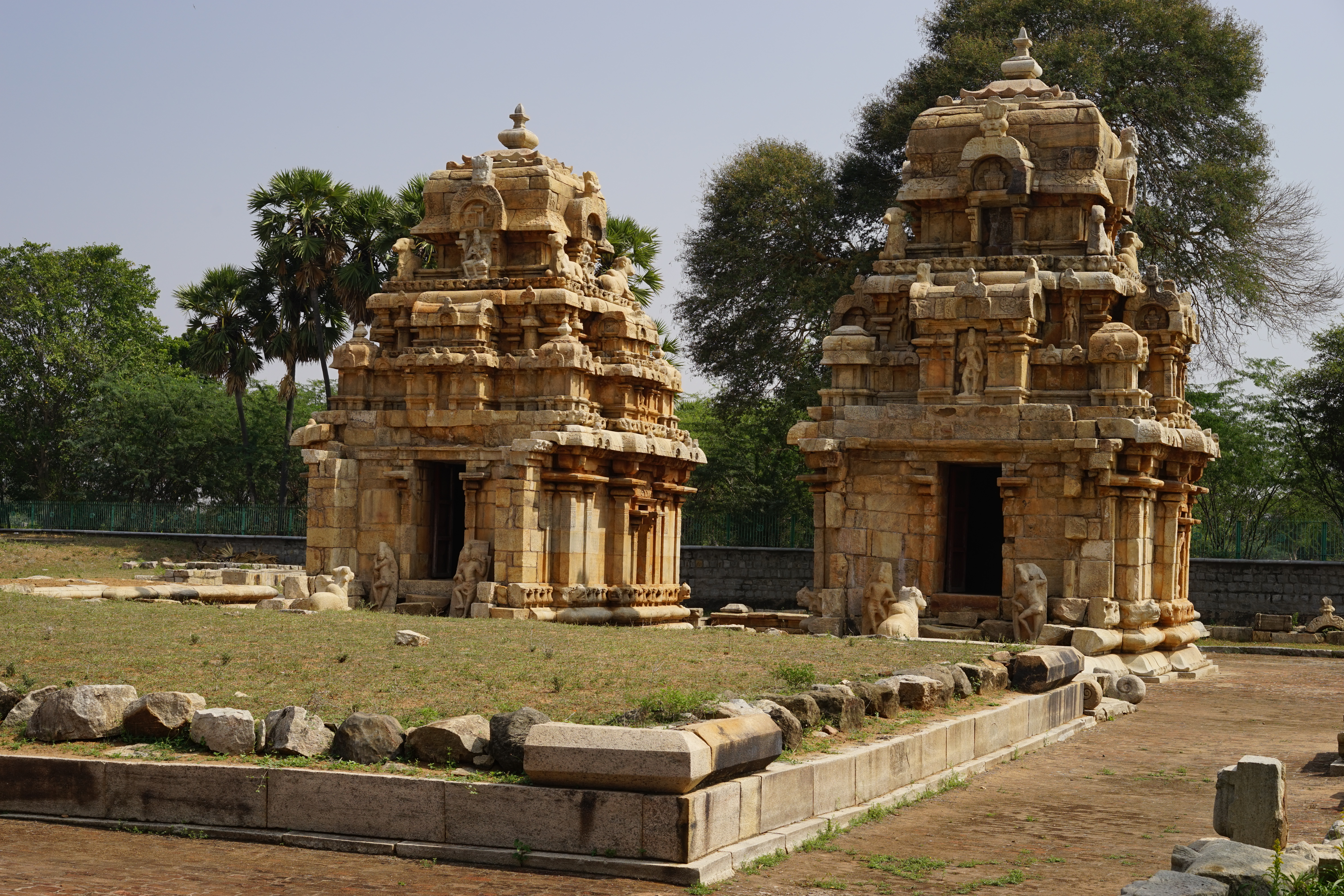

Religion
- Affiliation: Hinduism
- District: Pudukkottai

Location
- Location: Kodumbalur
- State: Tamil Nadu
- Country: India
- Interactive map of Moovar Koil
- Coordinates: 10.542272°N 78.519148°E

Moovar Koil or "The Three temples" is a Hindu temple complex situated in the village of Kodumbalur, 36 kilometres from Pudukkottai in Tamil Nadu, India. These temples were constructed by the Chola feudatory and Irukkuvel chieftain Boothi Vikramakesari as per the inscription. Only two of the three temples have managed to survive. The place was ruled by Irukkuvel chieftains. Kodumbalur was also the site of a fierce battle between the Pandyas and the Pallavas.

== Architecture ==
According to the chief's inscription, he built three temples in the complex in the name of himself and the other two of his wives, namely, Nangai Varaguna Perumanar and Karrali. Only the basement survives the northern shrine. The basement is moulded like a full blown lotus flower(padma pushkala adisthanas). The other two shrines, namely the central and southern are more or less intact. Each central shrine is 6.4 sqmetres at the base and they all face west. The walls are rich in details and there is a small shrine for Nandi in front of the Maha mandapa. The two circular pilasters with circular shafts on four sides of the vimana indicates the antiquity of the temple. The feature is possibly termed Vrittasputitas in silpa texts like Shilparatna. Such a feature is otherwise found only in few other temples like Neyyadiappar Temple, Tillaistanam, Tiruttalinathar Temple in Thiruputhur, Vijayalaya Choleeswaram in Narthamalai, Anantheswara temple in Udayarkudi and Kampaheswarar Temple, Thirubuvanam.

According to historian Harle, the temple is counted among the four early extant temples of the Chola Empire, with the other three being Koranganatha Temple in Tiruchirappalli district, Nageswaran temple at Kumbakonam and Brahmapureeswarar temple in Thanjavur district. These temples follow the Pallava architecture which are relatively small in size. They all have a fair-sized porch, locally called ardhamandapa attached to the sanctum, both of which are slightly below the ground level in a pit kind of structure. The structures are also predominantly built of stone.

Near Moovar Koil, located little westerly is a Hindu temple of Muchukundeswarar temple of Early Chola period. The temple complex is maintained and administered by the Archaeological Survey of India as a ticketed monument.

== Significance ==
The temple is very important as it is a living example of early to medieval Chola architecture. The inscription in the temple also gives us a glimpse of the political climate of south India between the 8th and the 10th centuries as well as the relation between the royal houses of Chola and the Irukkuvel. The latter were traditional allies of the Cholas and the chief, Boothi Vikramakesari himself was the son of a Chola princess Anupama and Irukkuvel chieftain Samarabirama.

== Gallery ==
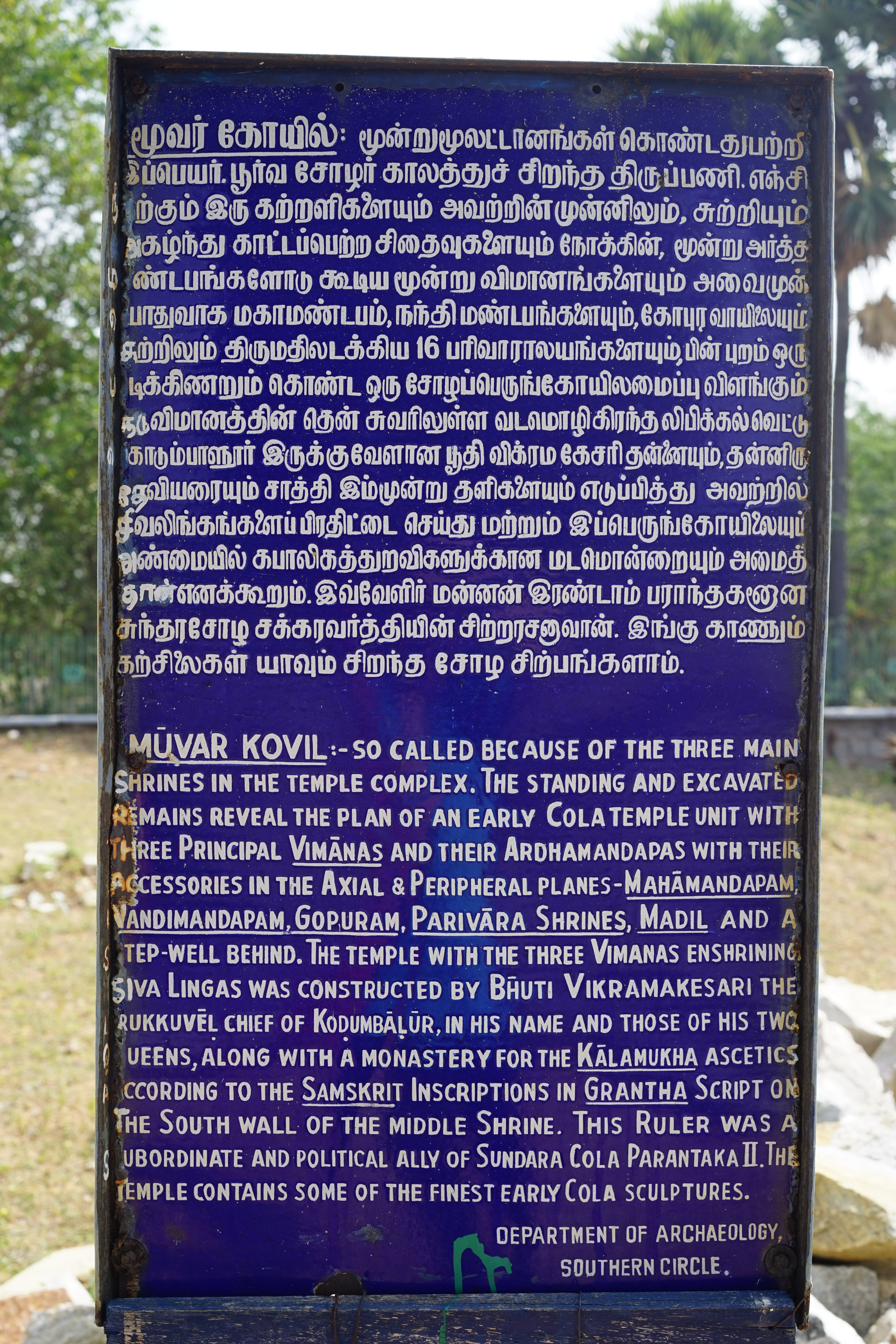
Moovar Koil Information Board by Archeological Survey of India

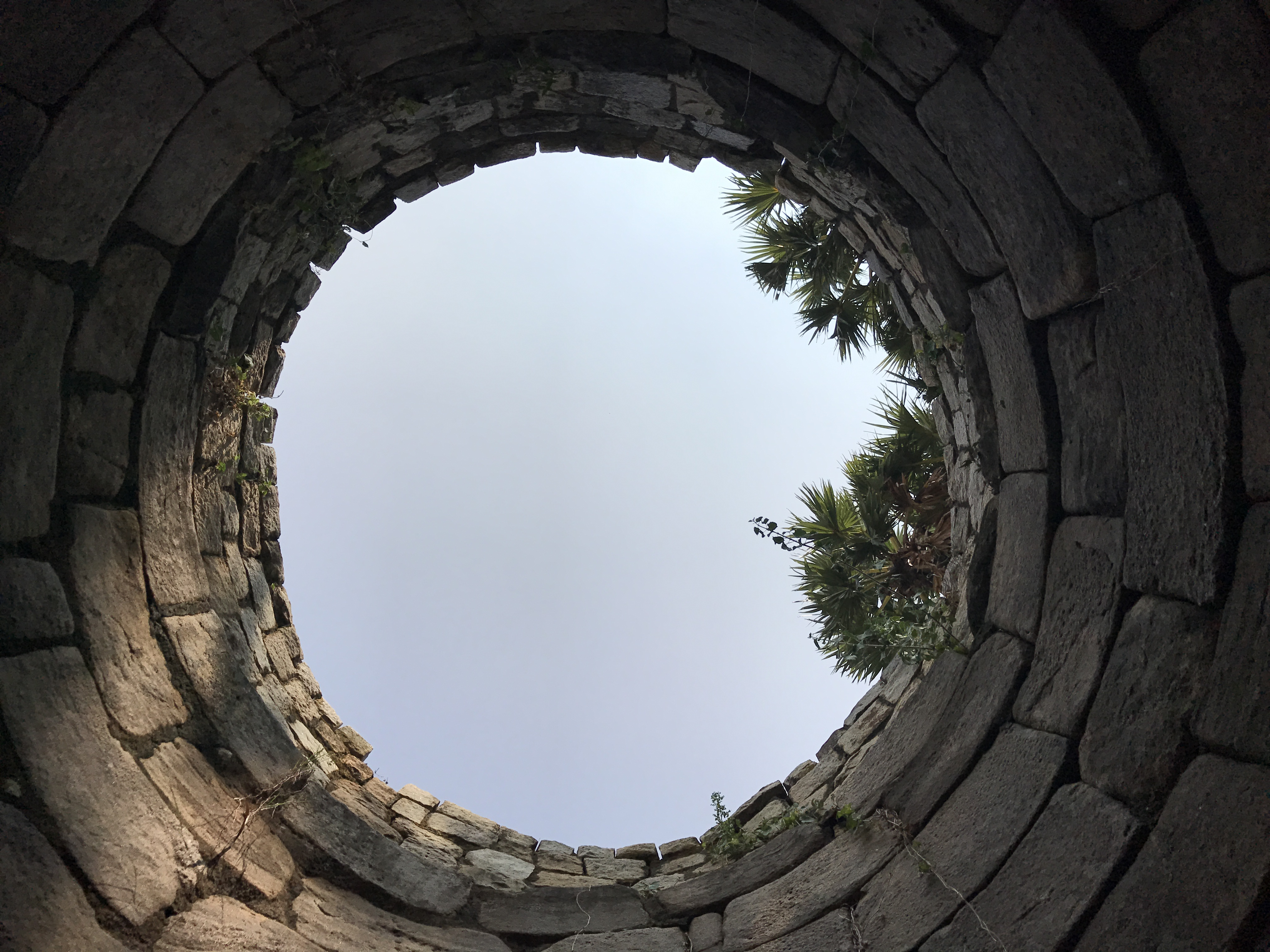
Photo take from inside the Moovar Koil Stepwell

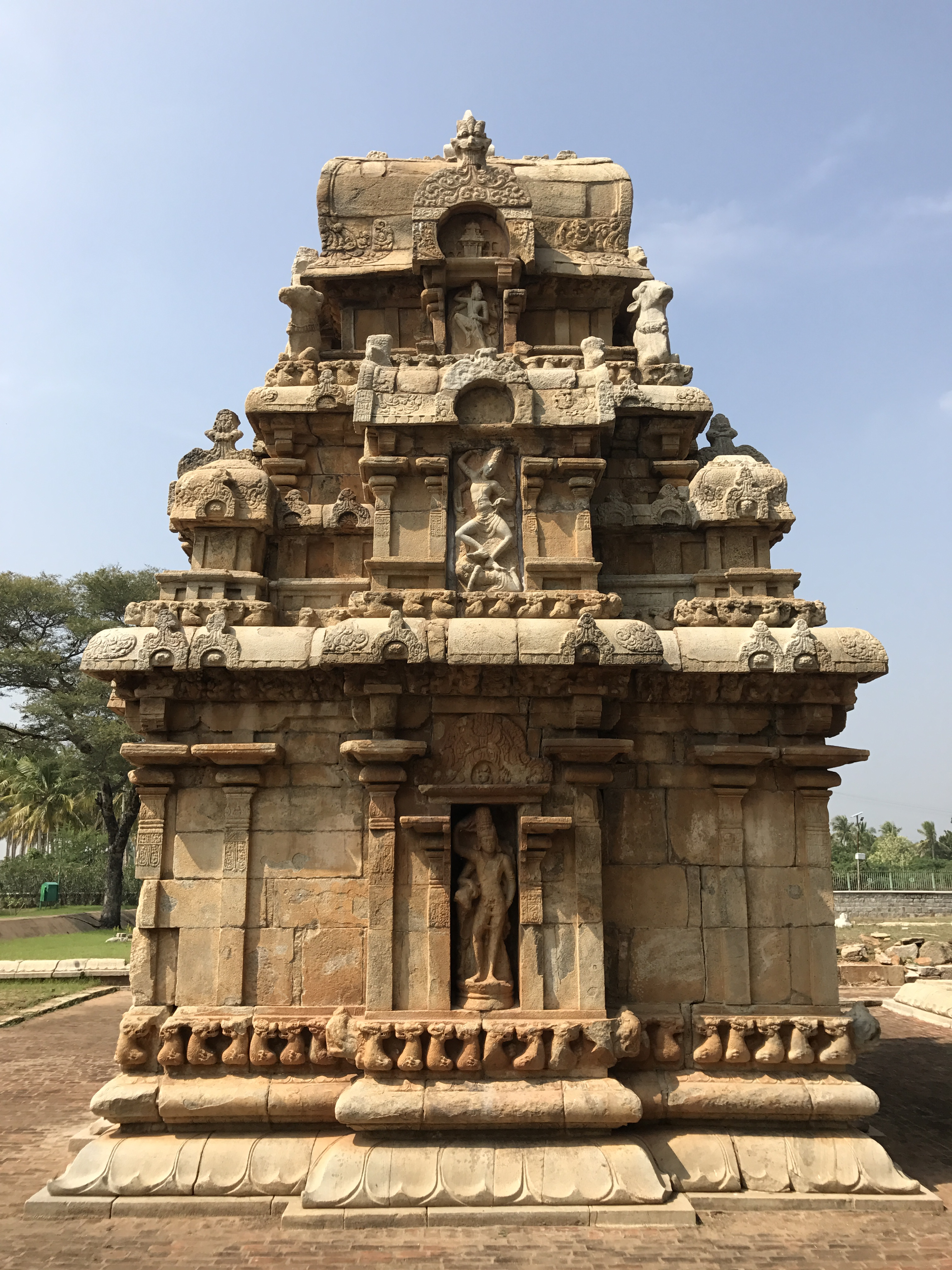
Moovar Koil sculptures

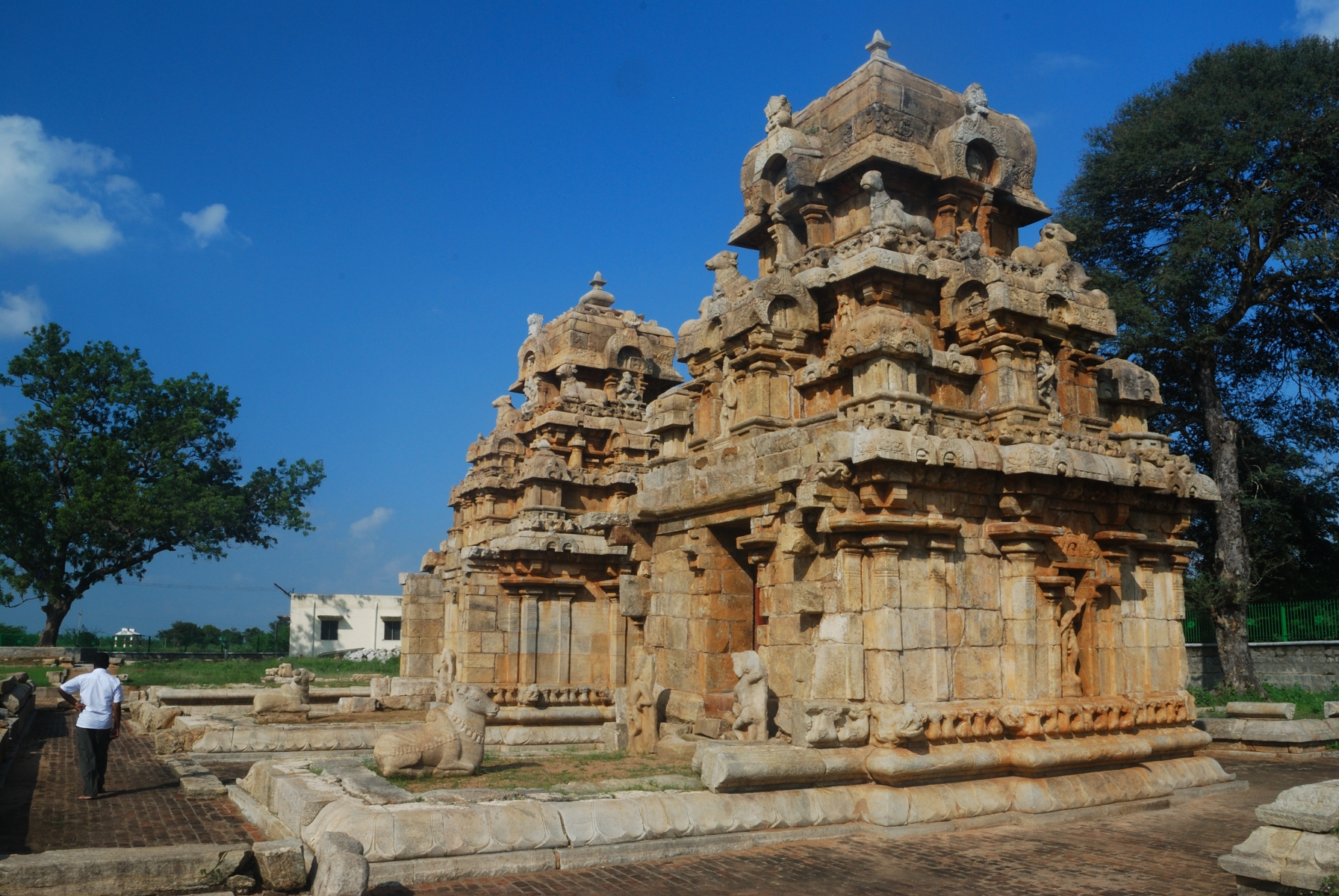
Moovar Koil
