= Irunkōvēl =

Title of the Irunkōvēl line of Yadu Velir kings

Irunkōvēl, also known as Irungkōvēl, Irukkuvēl, and Ilangōvēlir, was a title of the Irunkōvēl line of Velir kings. The Irunkovel line of kings ruled over Konadu identified with the Kodumbalur and surrounding areas in ancient Tamilakkam. They trace their lineage to the clan of Krishna; one of the inscriptions at Kodumbalur belonging to one of the kings in the Irunkovel line, namely Tennavan Irunkōvēl. According to inscriptions available the Irunkovel chieftains claimed Yadava lineage and Purananuru mentions that they migrated from Tuvarai and claimed Vantuvarapati title meaning rulers of Dwaraka. According to P. Ramanathan, the kottai velallar are related to the Irunkovel chieftains. According to Nilakanta Sasthri the title Irunkovel is held by many communities historically and it is not possible to trace the Irunkovel chieftains to any community. Kallar chiefs also appear to have relations with Irunkovel rulers.

== The contemporary of Karikala ==
The most famous among them was a contemporary of Karikala Chola as well as poet Kapilar and lived during the Sangam era. There is a song of Kapilar when Irunkovel would not accept Pari s daughters. Sangam literature mentions a chieftain called Irunkovel who could trace his lineage back over 49 generations to residence in Dvārakā. He is later defeated by Karikala Chola and becomes a subordinate to the Chola sovereign.

== Irungola Cholas ==
The Irungovel chieftains were not merely feudatories but were related to the Cholas through matrimony. The Cholas considered the offspring of these unions as one of their own and referred to them as Irungolar meaning child or son in their epigraphs. These princes assumed both the Chola and Irungovel titles like for example there was one Adavallan Gangaikonda Cholan alias Irungolan during the time of Kulottunga I and then there was a certain Sendamangalam Udaiyan Araiyan Edirili Cholan alias Irungolan during the reign of Kulottunga III.

Although the Irukkovels were called Yaduvamsaketu, Mr. V. Mahadevan has shown through the Tirupazhana inscription that they belonged to the Kallar lineage. The title “Irukkovel” is still the title of a section of the Kallar people living in Thanjavur, Trichy and Pudukkottai areas.
