= Kodumbalur =

Village in India

Coordinates: 10°32′N 78°31′E

Kodumbalur is a village in Pudukkottai district, Tamil Nadu, India. It is the site of the Moovar Koil temple complex.

Kodumbalur This town is said to have an important place in history. Information about the Cholas is usually classified into the early Chola kings and the later Chola kings. Between these two periods, in the 3rd century CE, the rule of the middle-period Chola kings came to an end. It is known that the last king of the early Cholas was Nalladi.

After about 500 years, in the 9th century CE, the Chola kings regained the rule they had lost. During the intervening period, under the rule of the Kalabhras, there is no information available about the place of residence of the Chola dynasty. However, it is believed that during this time, the Chola royal family lived in this town of Kodumbalur, which was located between Chola Nadu and Pandya Nadu.

Reference: Maamanan Rajarajan by Author Kundrilkumar

E MURUGAN

== Location ==
It is located at a distance of 35km from Trichy and 40km from Pudukkottai. The name Kodumbalur has been mentioned in the Tamil epic Cilappatikaram.

== Architecture ==
The architectural structure existed here are the forerunner for Dravidiyan style. The remaining structures of Moovar Koil and Mujukundeeswarer temple attract many tourists to this place. It is under the control of Archaeological Survey of India.
