= History of education in the Indian subcontinent =

Education in the Indian subcontinent began with the teaching of traditional subjects, including Indian religions, mathematics, and logic. Early Hindu and Buddhist centers of learning, such as the ancient Takshashila (in modern-day Pakistan), Nalanda (in India), Mithila (in India and Nepal), Vikramshila, Telhara, and Shaunaka Mahashala in the Naimisharanya forest, served as key sites for education. Islamic education became prominent with the establishment of Islamic empires in the region during the Middle Ages. Later, Europeans introduced Western education during the colonial period in India.

== Early history ==
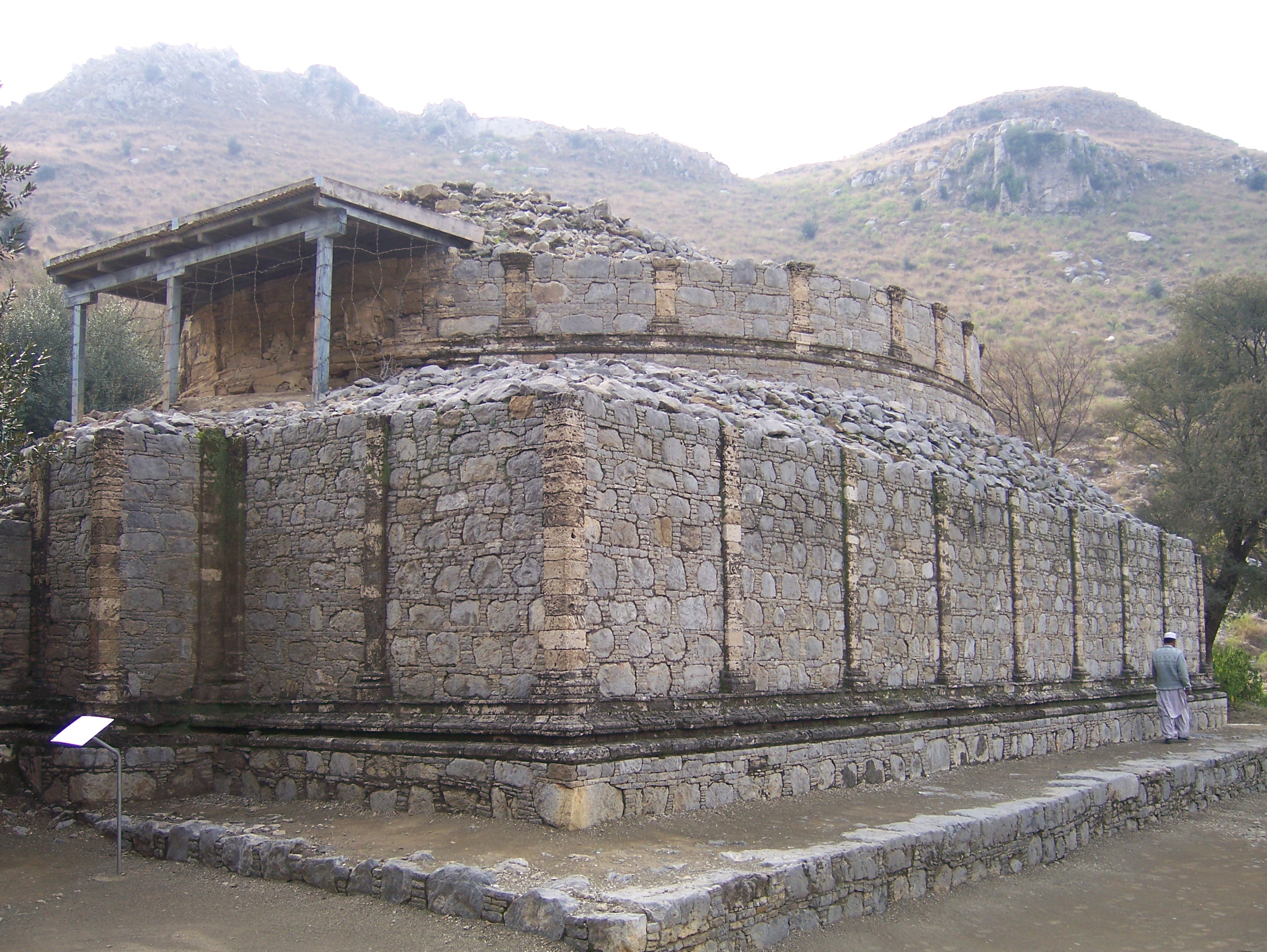
The Mohra Muradu monastery at Taxila, in modern-day Pakistan

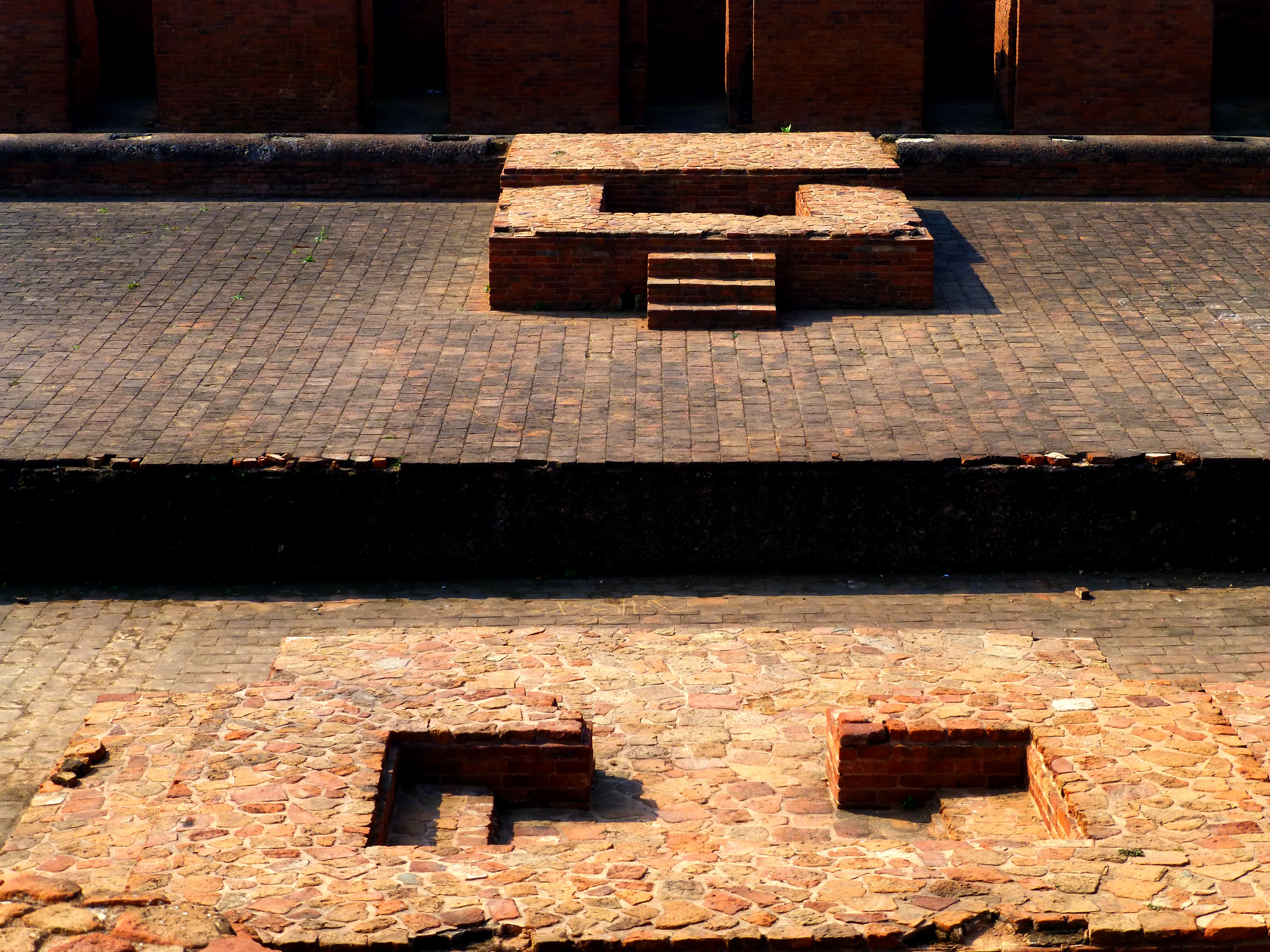
Nalanda - teaching platform

Early education in India began under the guidance of a guru or prabhu. Instruction was based on varna (social class) and the specific duties associated with each caste. Brahmans studied scriptures and religion, while Kshatriya were trained in various aspects of warfare. Shudras, who belonged to the working class, were taught skills necessary for different occupations.

The earliest educational institutions in India were often isolated from populated areas, where students followed strict monastic rules set by their guru and lived in ashrams away from cities. However, as the population grew during the Gupta Empire, urban centers of learning became more common, with cities like Varanasi and the Buddhist center at Nalanda gaining prominence.

Education in India traditionally had strong ties to religion. Among the heterodox schools of thought were the Jain and Buddhist traditions. Buddhist education, in particular, was more inclusive. In addition to monastic training, Buddhist centers of learning such as Taxila and Nalanda evolved as urban institutions where subjects like grammar, medicine, philosophy, logic, metaphysics, arts, and crafts were taught.

These early Buddhist institutions of higher learning, including Taxila and Nalanda, continued to thrive well into the Common Era and attracted students from regions as far as China and Central Asia.

On the subject of education for the nobility, Joseph Prabhu writes: "Outside the religious framework, kings and princes were educated in the arts and sciences related to government: politics (danda-nıti), economics (vartta), philosophy (anvıksiki), and historical traditions (itihasa). Here, the authoritative source was Kautilya's Arthashastra, often compared to Niccolò Machiavelli's The Prince for its worldly outlook and political scheming."

The Rigveda (c. 1700–1000 BCE) mentions female poets called brahmavadinis, such as Lopamudra and Ghosha. By 800 BCE, women like Gargi and Maitreyi were noted as scholars in the Upnishads. Maya, the mother of the historical Buddha, was an educated queen, and other women in India contributed to the writing of the Pali canon. Among the composers of Sangam literature, 154 were women. However, despite these contributions, education and society of the era continued to be dominated by the educated male population.

== Early Common Era—High Middle Ages ==
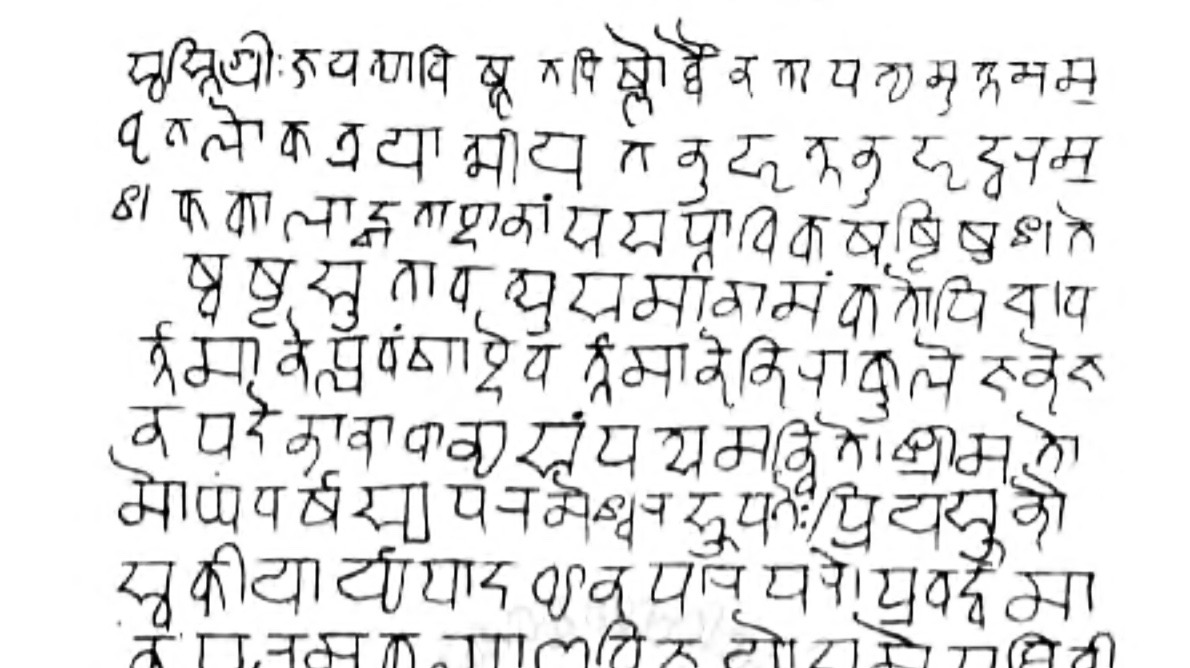
A mid 10th-century college land grant in Devanagari inscription (Sanskrit) discovered on a buried, damaged stone in north Karnataka. Parts of the inscription are in Canarese script.

Chinese scholars such as Xuanzang and Yi Jing traveled to Indian institutions of learning to study Buddhist texts. Yi Jing additionally recorded the arrival of 56 scholars from India, Japan, and Korea. However, during this period, Buddhist institutions of learning were gradually giving way to a resurgent tradition of Brahmanism.

Indian scholars also traveled to China to translate Buddhist texts. In the 10th century, a monk named Dharmadeva from Nalanda journeyed to China and translated several texts. Another center, Vikramshila, maintained close relations with Tibet, and the Buddhist teacher Atisa served as the head monk at Vikramshila before his journey to Tibet.

Examples of royal patronage include the construction of educational institutions under the Rastrakuta dynasty in 945 CE. These institutions provided multiple residences for educators, state-sponsored education, and arrangements for students and scholars. Similarly, the Chola dynasty in 1024 CE supported selected students in educational establishments through state funding.

Temple schools in the 12th–13th centuries, such as the school at the Nataraja temple in Chidambaram, employed 20 librarians. Among them, eight were tasked with copying manuscripts, two were responsible for verifying the copies, and the rest handled other duties, including preservation and maintenance of reference materials.

Another institution from this period was the Uddandapura institute, established in the 8th century under the patronage of the Pala dynasty. This institute developed ties with Tibet and became a center of Tantric Buddhism. By the 10th–11th centuries, the number of monks at Uddandapura reached a thousand, matching the strength of the monastic community at the sacred Mahabodhi complex.

By the time the Islamic scholar Al Biruni arrived, India already had an established system of science and technology. However, by the 12th century, invasions from India's northern borders began to disrupt traditional educational systems, as foreign armies raided educational institutions, among other establishments.

== Late Middle Ages—Early Modern Era ==
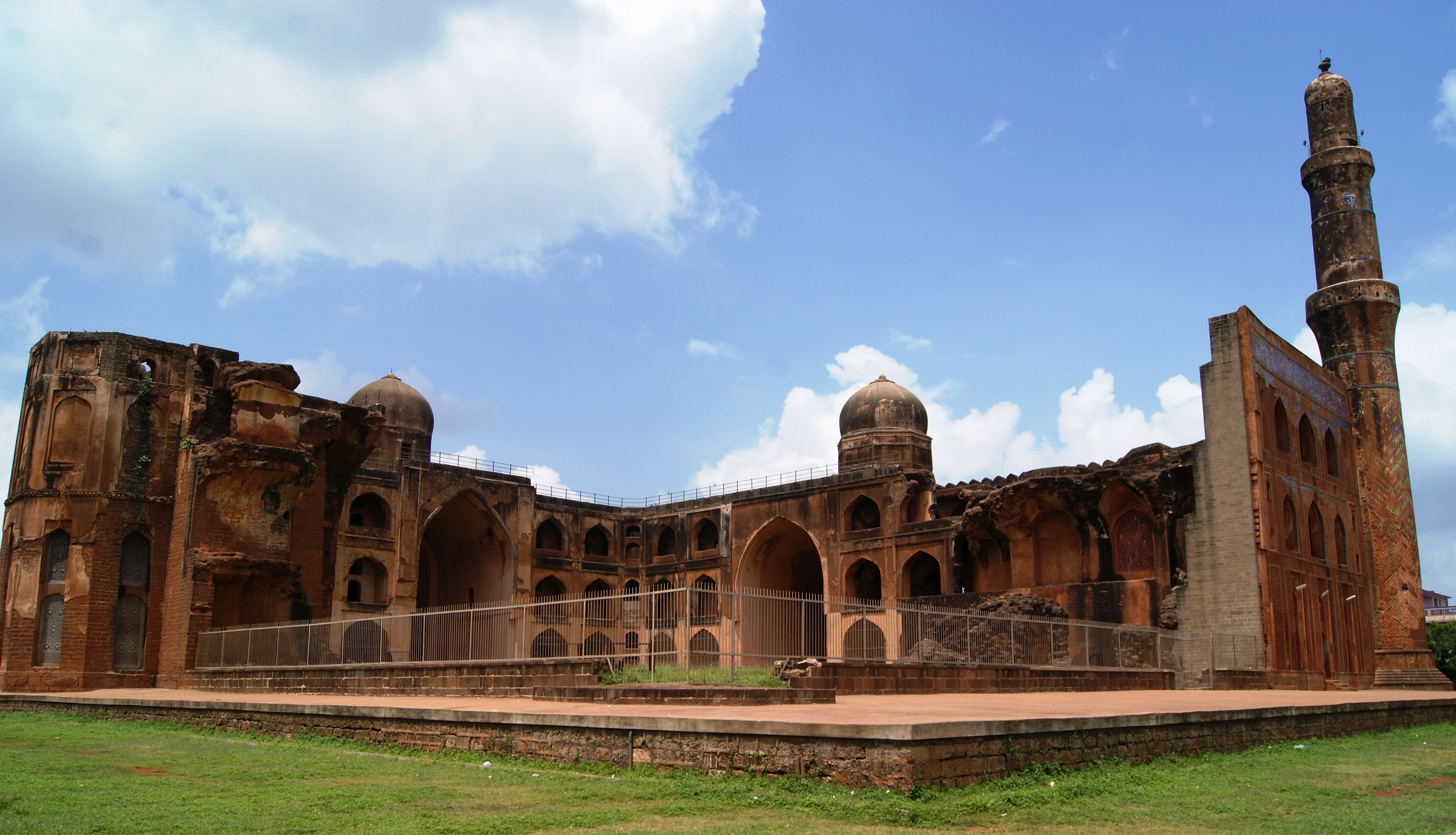
The 15th-century Mahmud Gawan Madrasa in Bidar

With the advent of Islam in India, traditional methods of education increasingly came under Islamic influence. Pre-Mughal rulers, such as Qutb-ud-din Aybak and other Muslim leaders, established institutions focused on imparting religious knowledge. Prominent scholars like Nizamuddin Auliya and Moinuddin Chishti became influential educators and founded Islamic monasteries. Students from regions such as Bukhara and Afghanistan traveled to India to study subjects in the humanities and sciences.

Islamic educational institutions in India included traditional madrassas and maktabs, which taught grammar, philosophy, mathematics, and law—subjects influenced by Greek traditions inherited by Persia and the Middle East before the spread of Islam into India. A key feature of traditional Islamic education was its emphasis on the connection between science and the humanities.

One prominent educational center in 18th-century Delhi was the Madrasah-i Rahimiyah, led by Shah Waliullah, an educator who advocated for a balanced approach integrating Islamic scriptures with scientific studies. The curriculum at Madrasah-i Rahimiyah included two books on grammar, one on philosophy, two on logic, two on astronomy and mathematics, and five on mysticism.

Another notable center emerged in Lucknow under Mulla Nizamuddin Sahlawi, who taught at Firangi Mahal and developed the Dars-i-Nizami curriculum. This program combined traditional studies with contemporary knowledge and emphasized logic.

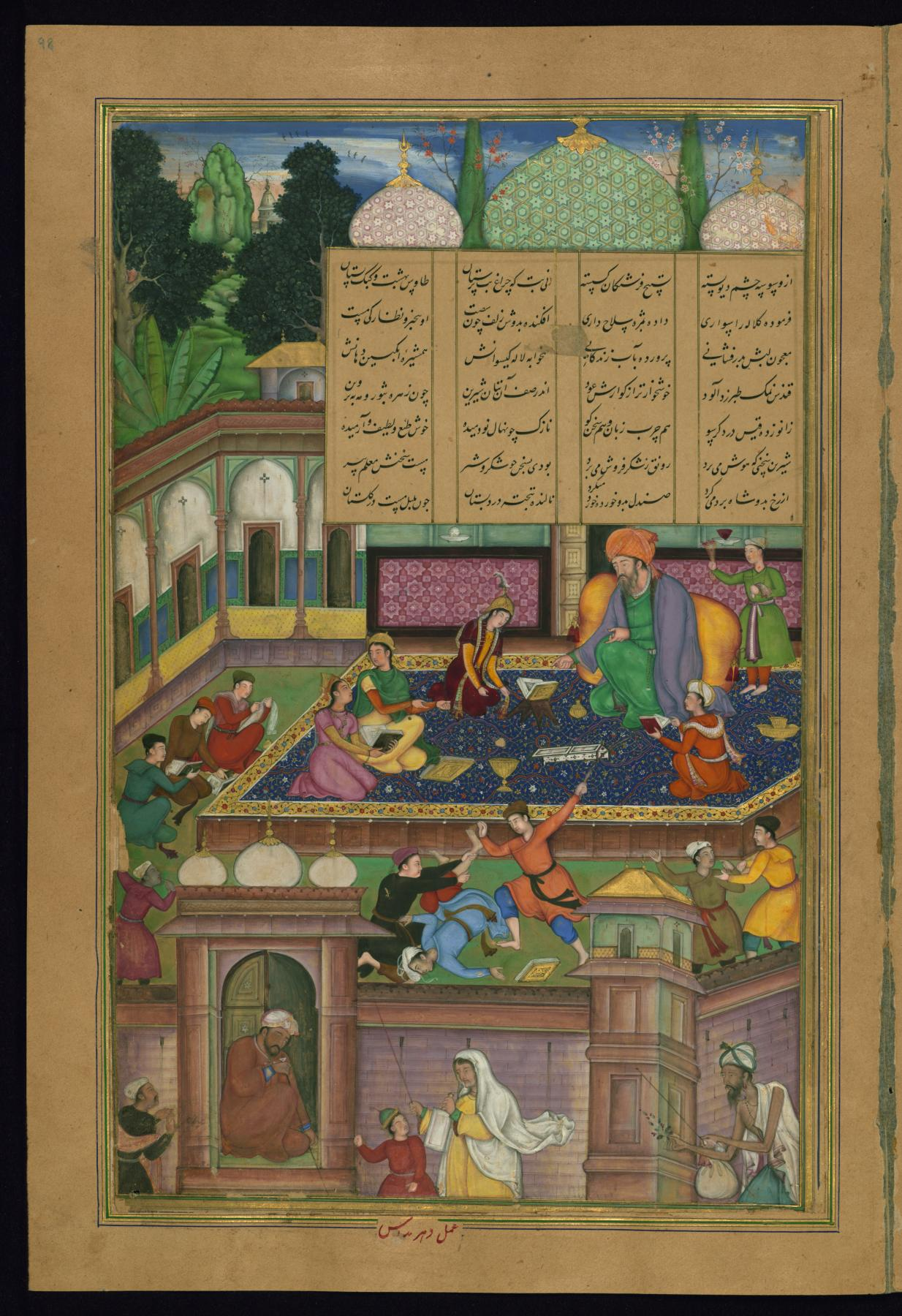
A Mughal Era Maktab (Primary School) in Lahore. Painting by Dharmadasa c.1597-1598

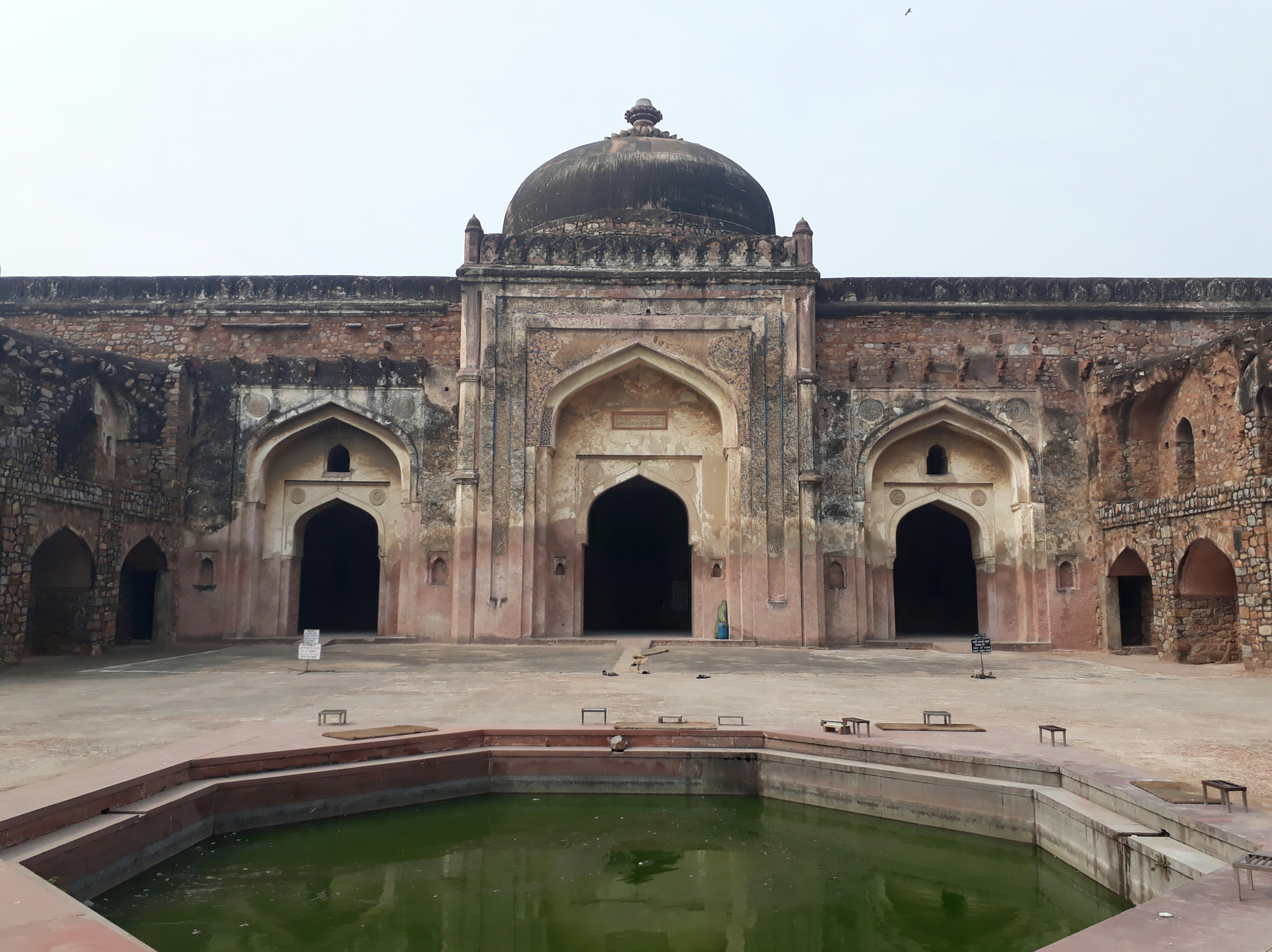
The Khairul Manazil a Madrasa founded by Maham Anga in 1561 under the reign of Akbar.

Under Akbar's rule, the education system adopted an inclusive approach, with the monarch encouraging courses in medicine, agriculture, geography, and texts from various languages and religions, including Patanjali's work in Sanskrit. Traditional sciences during this period were influenced by the ideas of Aristotle, Bhāskara II, Charaka, and Ibn Sina. This inclusive approach was not uncommon in Mughal India.

Even the more conservative ruler Aurangzeb supported the teaching of subjects useful for administration. The Mughals generally took a liberal approach to the sciences, and as contact with Persia increased, the more rigid Ottoman manqul school of education was gradually replaced by the more flexible maqul school.

The Middle Ages also saw the rise of private tuition in India as the state failed to invest in the public education system. A tutor, or riyazi, was an educated professional who could earn a suitable living by performing tasks such as creating calendars or generating revenue estimates for the nobility. Another trend during this era was the mobility among professions, exemplified by Qaim Khan, a prince renowned for his mastery in crafting leather shoes and forging cannons.

=== Traditional schools ===
Male education in India traditionally began under the supervision of a guru in schools called gurukuls. These gurukuls, supported by public donations, were among the earliest forms of publicly funded educational institutions.

Dharampal played a key role in reshaping the understanding of pre-colonial education in India. His primary works are based on documentation by the colonial government concerning Indian education, agriculture, technology, and arts during the colonial period. Dharampal's pioneering historical research, conducted over a decade, provides evidence from early British administrators' reports of the widespread presence of indigenous educational institutions in the Bombay, Bengal, and Madras Presidencies, as well as in the Punjab. These institutions taught a sophisticated curriculum, with daily school attendance by about 30% of children aged 6–15, the majority of whom were from the Shudra caste.

Austrian missionary, linguist, and orientalist Paulinus of St. Bartholomew spent 13 years traveling the Malabar Coast of Hyder Ali's Kingdom of Mysore, starting in 1776. During this time, he compiled and later published the first European grammar of Sanskrit, highlighting similarities between Sanskrit and other Indo-European languages. He also provided a critique of education in the Kingdom, noting:

The education of youth in India is much simpler, and not near so expensive as in Europe. The children assemble half naked under the shade of a coconut tree; place themselves in rows on the ground, and trace out on the sand, with the fore finger of the right hand, the elements of their alphabet, and then smooth it with the left when they wish to trace out other characters. The writing master, called Agian, or Eluttacien, who stations himself opposite to his pupils, examines what they have done; points out their faults, and shows them how to correct them. At first, he attends them standing; but when the young people have acquired some readiness in writing, he places himself cross-legged on a tiger or deer skin, or even on a mat made of the leaves of the coconut-tree, or wild bananas, which is called Kaida*, plaited together. This method of teaching writing was introduced into India two hundred years before the birth of Christ, according to the testimony of Magasthenes, and still continues to be practised. No people, perhaps, on earth have adhered so much to their ancient usages and customs as the Indians.

A schoolmaster in Malabar receives every two months, from each of his pupils, for the instruction given them, two Fanon or Panam. Some do not pay in money, but give him a certain quantity of rice, so that this expense becomes very easy to the parents. There are some teachers who instruct children without any fee, and are paid by the overseers of the temple, or by the chief of the caste. When the pupils have made tolerable progress in writing, they are admitted into certain schools, called Eutupalli, where they begin to write on palm leaves (Pana), which, when several of them are stitched together, and fastened between two boards, form a Grantha, that is, an Indian book. If such a book be written upon with an iron style, it is called Granthavari, or Lakya, that is, writing, to distinguish it from Alakya, which is something not written.

When the Guru, or teacher, enters the school, he is always received with the utmost reverence and respect. His pupils must throw themselves down at full length before him; place their right hand on their mouth, and not venture to speak a single word until he gives them express permission. Those who talk and prate contrary to the prohibition of their master are expelled from the school, as boys who cannot restrain their tongue, and who are consequently unfit for the study of philosophy. By these means the preceptor always receives that respect which is due to him: the pupils are obedient, and seldom offend against rules which are so carefully inculcated. ...

— FRA PAOLINO DA BARTOLOMEO, ON EDUCATION OF CHILDREN IN INDIA, Rome, 1796

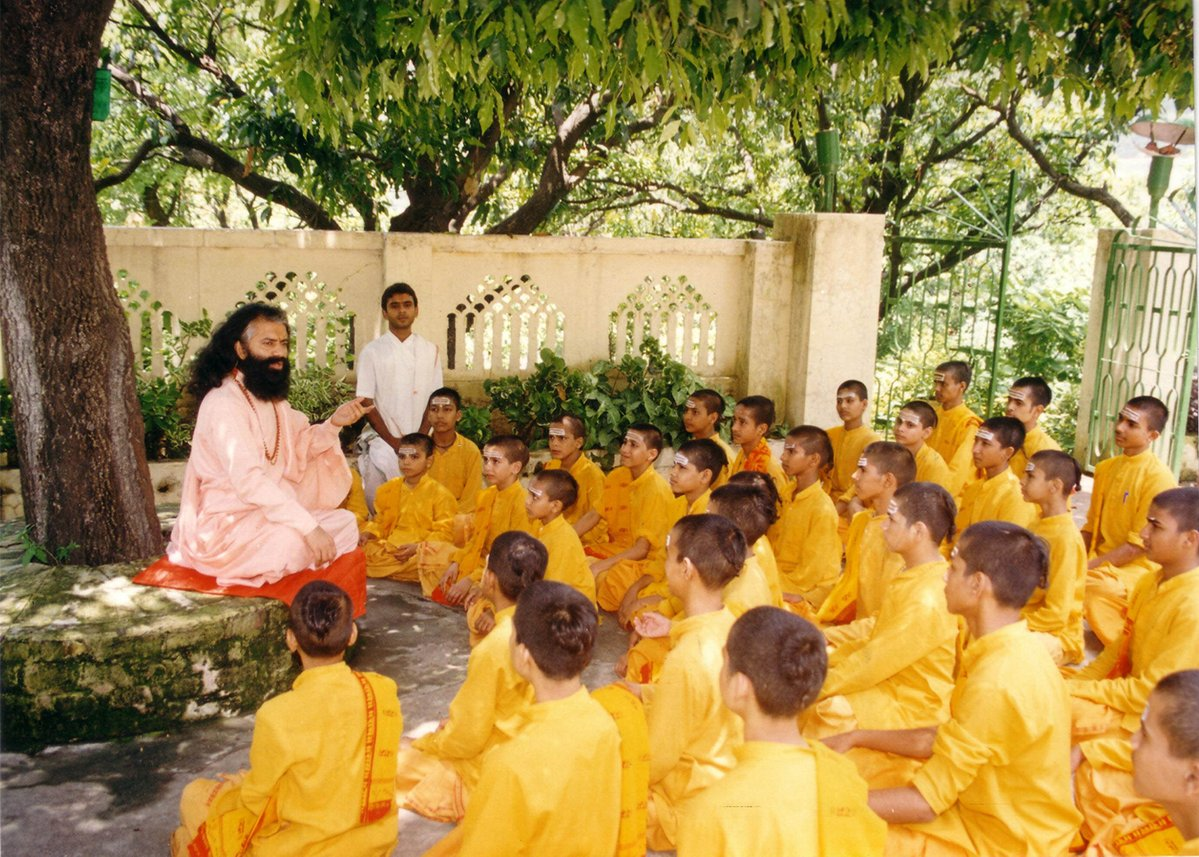
A Gurukul, a Traditional form of Primary education in India.

A nearly identical system was observed, described, and documented in Adam's 1836 report on vernacular education in Bengal and Bihar. This report detailed village schools where boys, typically between the ages of 5–6 and 10–12, received instruction from a respectable guru at or near his home for a small fee. This system of instruction was still being illustrated by local artists in the 1850s.

Indigenous education held significant importance from early times through the colonial era.

In every Hindoo village which has retained anything of its form, I am assured that the rudiments of knowledge are sought to be imparted; that there is not a child, except those of the outcasts (who form no part of the community), who is not able to read, to write, to cipher; in the last branch of learning they are confessedly most proficient.

— John Malcolm Forbes Ludlow British India, Vol 1,1858, p62-3

G.L. Prendergast, a member of the Governor's Council in the Bombay Presidency, recorded the following about indigenous schools on 27 June 1821:

"I need hardly mention what every member of the Board knows as well as I do, that there is hardly a village, great or small, throughout our territories, in which there is not at least one school, and in larger villages more; many in every town, and in large cities in every division; where young natives are taught reading, writing and arithmetic, upon a system so economical, from a handful or two of grain, to perhaps a rupee per month to the school master, according to the ability of the parents, and at the same time so simple and effectual, that there is hardly a cultivator or petty dealer who is not competent to keep his own accounts with a degree of accuracy, in my opinion, beyond what we meet with amongst the lower orders in our own country."

== Colonial era ==
The Jesuits introduced India to both the European college system and book printing by founding Saint Paul's College in Goa in 1542. The French traveler François Pyrard de Laval, who visited Goa around 1608, described the College of St. Paul and praised the variety of subjects taught there free of charge. Like many other European travelers who visited the college, he recorded that it had 3,000 students at the time, drawn from missions across Asia. Its library was one of the largest in Asia, and the first printing press in the region was established there in September 1556.

=== British India ===
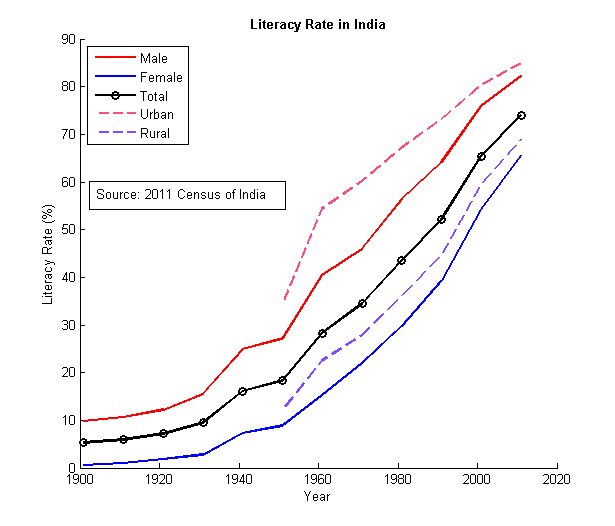
Literacy in India grew very slowly until independence in 1947. An acceleration in the rate of literacy growth occurred in the 1991–2001 period.

In 19th-century India, "English education" was synonymous with "modern education." Most schools taught a curriculum similar to that of British public schools, using English as the medium of instruction, particularly in institutions sponsored by missionaries. Some schools, however, taught the curriculum in vernacular languages, with English as a second language.

The term "pre-modern" referred to three types of schools: Arabic and Sanskrit schools, which taught Muslim or Hindu sacred literature, Persian schools, which focused on Persian literature, and vernacular schools across India, which taught reading, writing in the vernacular language, and arithmetic.

As a result of decades of lobbying by figures such as William Wilberforce and Charles Grant, the 1813 renewal of East India Company's charter included a duty to educate the population and allowed previously excluded Christian missionaries to aid in this endeavor, in addition to the Company's corporate activities.

The Company's officers were divided on how to implement this mandate. Orientalists believed education should be conducted in Indian languages, favoring classical or court languages like Sanskrit and Persian. On the other hand, utilitarians (also known as anglicists), such as Lord William Bentinck and Thomas Macaulay, argued that traditional India had little to offer in terms of modern skills, and they advocated for education in English. Macaulay proposed an educational approach—now known as Macaulayism—that aimed to create a class of anglicized Indians who would serve as cultural intermediaries between the British and the Indian populace.

What came to be known as the princely states also approached the question of English education from their own perspective, as some of them saw in it the opportunity to learn how to deal with the British threat.

==== Early 19th-century surveys ====
According to Sir Thomas Munro's Minutes on Native Education in 1822 and 1826, the Madras Presidency had 11,758 schools and 740 centers for higher education, nearly all of which—except a few European missionary schools—were funded and managed at the community level. The recorded number of students was 161,667, with 157,644 boys and 4,023 girls, meaning approximately 1 in 6 school-age boys attended school, which was higher than the 1 in 8 rate recorded in a similar survey in the Bombay Presidency.

According to Adam's enquiry around 1835, there were approximately 100,000 village schools in the Bengal Presidency, providing education to about 13.2% of boys. Although the instruction in these schools was criticized as rudimentary and below European standards, focusing primarily on rote memorization.

Munro's 1826 critique also addressed funding and teacher quality in the traditional education system. He noted that, due to the low earnings of teachers—no more than 6 or 7 Rupees monthly from fees of 4 to 8 Annas per pupil—the quality of teaching was lacking. Munro suggested that the East India Company (EIC) fund the construction of new schools, provide textbooks, and offer a stipend of 9 to 15 Rupees to teachers in the new schools to supplement their incomes from tuition fees in the Madras Presidency. After the introduction of Western-style education, the number of these indigenous educational institutions began to decline significantly.

Educational comparison of England and Madras presidency of India
	England	Madras presidency
population	12,000,000 (1816)	12,350,941 (1823)
No of students attending schools	875,000/1,500,000 (approx)	161,667

In the Punjab Province, Dr. Leitner, the Principal of the Oriental College and Government College in Lahore, estimated that in 1855-1856—six years after the province was annexed by the East India Company—there were at least five thousand indigenous schools operating. Assuming an average of six pupils per indigenous school, the total number of pupils was approximately thirty thousand. In contrast, there were 456 government-supported schools, with an average of about 13 pupils per school, educating an additional 6,064 pupils in a region that hosted a population of 17.6 million.

Leitner criticized the Provincial Government for subsidizing the education of pupils in the government-supported schools at Rs 15 per year, while indigenous schools charged only one Rupee per pupil.

==== Reform ====
British education became firmly established in India with the founding of missionary schools during the 1820s.

Macaulay succeeded in replacing Persian with English as the administrative language through the English Education Act 1835, which established English as the medium of instruction and promoted the training of English-speaking Indians as teachers. He was inspired by utilitarian ideas and advocated for what he referred to as "useful learning."

In 1854, the Wood's despatch to the then Governor-General Dalhousie stipulated a number of reforms to be made to the Company's education system in British India.

The effectiveness of the measures outlined in the Wood's despatch was subsequently reviewed, and a number of changes were made following the publication of William Hunter's Report of the Indian Education Commission in 1882, which was released in 1883.

Census of India - Number of institutions and pupils according to the returns of the Education Department since 1855
	Number of institutions								
Class of institution	1941	1931	1921	1911	1901	1891	1881	1871	1855
Universities and colleges		333	233	193	186	155			
Universities	16	16	13	4	4	4	3	3	
Arts colleges		244	154				70	42	21
Professional colleges		73	66				62	26	13
Secondary schools		13,581	8,816	6,442	5,416	5,134	3,906	3,070	281
Primary schools		204,384	158,792	118,413	97,116	99,630	84,734	16,473	2,810
Special schools		8,891	3,948	5,783	956	550			
Unrecognized institutions		34,879	33,929	39,491	43,292		25,150		47,866
Total		262,068	206,016	179,322	148,966	149,794	112,632	83,052	50,998
	Scholars								
Class of institution	1941	1931	1921	1911	1901	1891	1881	1871	1855
Universities and colleges		92,029	59,595	31,447	20,447	18,878			
Universities		8,159							
Arts colleges		66,837	46,737				7,205	3,566	3,246
Professional colleges		17,002	12,203				4,163	2,826	912
Secondary schools		2,286,411	1,239,524	890,06l	582,551	530,783	117,044	204,294	33,801
Primary schools		9,362,748	6,310,451	4,575,465	8,150,678	3,051,925	2,152,311	607,320	96,923
Special schools		315,650	132,706	164,544	83,000	23,381			
Unrecognized institutions		632,249	639,126	630,438	617,818		354,655		788,701
Total		12,689,086	8,381,401	8,281,955	4,405,988	4,207,021	2,766,436	1,894,823	923,780
	Literacy rate (age 5+)								
Percentage	1941	1931	1921	1911	1901	1891	1881	1871	1855
Male	24.9	15.6	12.2	10.6	9.8	8.44	8.1		
Female	7.3	2.9	1.8	1.0	0.6	0.42	0.35		
Total	16.1	9.5	7.2	5.9	5.4	4.62	4.32	3.25	

=== Universities ===
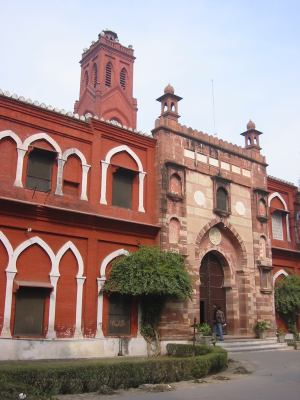
Victoria gate, named after the Empress in 1914, at the Aligarh Muslim University

India established a dense educational network, primarily for males, featuring a Western curriculum based on instruction in English. To advance their careers, many ambitious upper-class men, including Gandhi, Nehru, and Muhammad Ali Jinnah, traveled to England, particularly to obtain legal education at the Inns of Court. By 1890, approximately 60,000 Indians had matriculated, mainly in the liberal arts or law. About a third entered public administration, while another third became lawyers, resulting in a well-educated professional state bureaucracy.

By 1887, of the 21,000 mid-level civil service appointments, 45% were held by Hindus, 7% by Muslims, 19% by Eurasians (individuals with one European parent and one Indian parent), and 29% by Europeans. Of the 1,000 top-level positions, almost all were held by Britons, typically graduates of Oxbridge. Today, the same syllabus introduced by the Indian National Congress continues to be followed in India.

The Raj, often collaborating with local philanthropists, established 186 colleges and universities. Starting with 600 students spread across four universities and 67 colleges in 1882, the system expanded rapidly. However, there was never a unified "system" under the Raj, as each state acted independently and funded schools for Indians primarily from private sources. By 1901, there were five universities and 145 colleges with 18,000 students, almost all of whom were male. The curriculum was Western.

By 1922, most schools were under the control of elected provincial authorities, with little involvement from the national government. That year, there were 14 universities and 167 colleges, serving 46,000 students. By 1947, 21 universities and 496 colleges were in operation. Initially, universities did not engage in teaching or research; they only conducted examinations and awarded degrees.

The Madras Medical College opened in 1835 and admitted women so they could treat the female population, who traditionally shied away from medical treatment under qualified male professionals. The concept of educated women in the medical profession gained popularity during the late 19th century, and by 1894, the Women's Christian Medical College, an exclusive medical school for women, was established in Ludhiana, Punjab.

The British established the Government College University in Lahore, in present-day Pakistan, in 1864. The institution was initially affiliated with the University of Calcutta for examinations. The prestigious University of the Punjab, also located in Lahore, was the fourth university established by the British in South Asia, founded in 1882.

The Muhammadan Anglo-Oriental College, founded in 1875, was the first modern institution of higher education for Muslims in India. By 1920, it became the Aligarh Muslim University and emerged as the leading intellectual center of Muslim political activity. The original goals of the institution were to train Muslims for British service and prepare an elite that would attend universities in Britain. After 1920, it evolved into a center of political activism.

Before 1939, the faculty and students supported an all-India nationalist movement. However, with the onset of the Second World War, political sentiment shifted toward demands for a Muslim separatist movement. The intellectual support provided by the university played a significant role in the success of Muhammad Ali Jinnah and the Muslim League.

At the 21st Conference of the Indian National Congress in Benares in December 1905, Madan Mohan Malaviya publicly announced his intent to establish a university in Varanasi. On 22 November 1911, he registered the Hindu University Society to gather support and raise funds for building the university. Malaviya sought and received early support from Kashi Naresh Prabhu Narayan Singh, Thakur Jadunath Singh of Arkha, and Rameshwar Singh Bahadur of Raj Darbhanga. Banaras Hindu University (BHU) was finally established in 1916, becoming the first university in India to result from a private individual's efforts.

Among the universities founded during this period are:

- University of Bombay (1857)
- University of Calcutta (1857)
- University of Madras (1857)
- University of the Punjab (1882)
- Allahabad University (1887)
- University of Mysore (1916)
- Patna University (1917)
- Osmania University (1918)
- Rangoon University (1920)
- University of Lucknow (1921)
- University of Dhaka (1921)
- University of Delhi (1922)
- Nagpur University (1923)
- Andhra University (1926)
- Agra University (1927)
- Annamalai University (1929)
- University of Kerala (1937)
- Utkal University (1943)
- Panjab University (1947)
- University of Rajputana (1947)

==== Engineering ====
In 1806, the East India Company established Haileybury College in England to train administrators. In India, there were four colleges of civil engineering; the first was Thomason College (now IIT Roorkee), founded in 1847. The second was Bengal Engineering College (now Indian Institute of Engineering, Science and Technology, IIEST). These institutions were established to provide civil engineers for the Indian Public Works Department.

In both Britain and India, the administration and management of science, technical, and engineering education were overseen by officers from the Royal Engineers and their Indian Army counterparts, commonly referred to as sapper officers. This trend in civil/military relationships continued with the establishment of the Royal Indian Engineering College (also known as Cooper's Hill College) in 1870, specifically to train civil engineers in England for duties with the Indian Public Works Department. Although technically a civilian organization, the Indian Public Works Department relied on military engineers until 1947 and beyond.

Growing awareness of the need for technical education in India led to the establishment of institutions such as the Indian Institute of Science, founded by philanthropist Jamshetji Tata in 1909. In 1919, Banaras Hindu University established the Banaras Engineering College, which became the Institute of Technology, Banaras Hindu University in 1968 and was designated an Indian Institute of Technology in 2012. By the 1930s, India had ten institutions offering engineering courses. However, with the advent of the Second World War in 1939, the "War Technicians Training Scheme" under Ernest Bevin was initiated, laying the foundation for modern technical education in India. Later, planned development of scientific education under Ardeshir Dalal began in 1944.

=== Criticism ===
In 1919, C. Sankaran Nair, the president of the Indian National Congress (INC), criticized the colonial education system:

Efforts were then made by the Government to confine higher education and secondary education leading to higher education to boys in affluent, circumstances. This again was done not in the interests of sound education but for political reasons. Rules were made calculated to restrict the diffusion of education generally and among the poorer boys in particular. Conditions for recognition for "grants" —stiff and various—were laid down and enforced, and the non-fulfilment of any one of these conditions was liable to be followed by serious consequences. Fees were raised to a degree which considering the circumstances of the classes that resort to schools, were abnormal. When it was objected that the minimum fee would be a great hardship to poor students the answer was—such students had no business to receive that kind of education. Managers of private schools who remitted fees in whole or in part were penalized by reduced grants-in-aid.Many schools were against the high fee but those who accepted it were given grants by British government. Along with fixed fee there was fix timetable, printed books etc. Students had to attend regular classes which was a problem for students belonging to peasant families. These rules had undoubtedly the effect of checking the great expansion of education that would have taken place. This is the real explanation of the very unsatisfactory character of the nature and progress of secondary education and it will never be remedied till we are prepared either to give education to the boys ourselves or to make sufficient grants to the private schools to enable them to be staffed with competent teachers. We are at present not prepared to do either. English education, according to this policy, is to be confined to the well-to-do classes.They, it was believed, would give no trouble to Government. For this purpose, the old system of education under which a pupil could prosecute his studies from the lowest to the highest class was altered.

— Sir Sankaran Nair, Minutes of Dissent

Robert Eric Frykenberg examines the period from 1784 to 1854 to argue that the colonial education system helped integrate the diverse elements of Indian society, thereby creating a new common bond among conflicting loyalties. The native elite demanded modern education. The University of Madras, founded in 1857, became the single most important recruiting ground for generations of increasingly trained officials. This exclusive and select leadership was almost entirely "clean-caste" and predominantly Brahman. The position of this mandarin class was never seriously challenged until well into the twentieth century.

Catriona Ellis argues that historians of Indian education have generally confined their analyses to narrow themes related to colonial dominance and education as a means of control, resistance, and dialogue. She emphasizes the need to evaluate the education actually experienced by most Indian children, which often occurred outside the classroom. Public education expenditures varied dramatically across regions, with the western and southern provinces spending three to four times as much as the eastern provinces. This disparity can be attributed to historical differences in land taxes; however, the rates of attendance and literacy were not nearly as skewed.

==== Bihar and Bengal villages ====
Sociologist Hetukar Jha argued that local schools for pre-adolescent children were flourishing in thousands of villages in Bihar and Bengal until the early decades of the nineteenth century. These were village institutions maintained by local elders with community funds, where children from all caste clusters and communities could, if their fathers wished, receive useful skills. However, British colonial policies regarding education and land control adversely affected both the village structure and the village institutions of secular education. The colonial legal system and the rise of caste consciousness in the second half of the nineteenth century only exacerbated the problem. Gradually, by the end of the nineteenth century, the village as a base of secular identity and solidarity became too weak to create and maintain its own institutions, leading to the decay of the traditional system.

==== Science ====
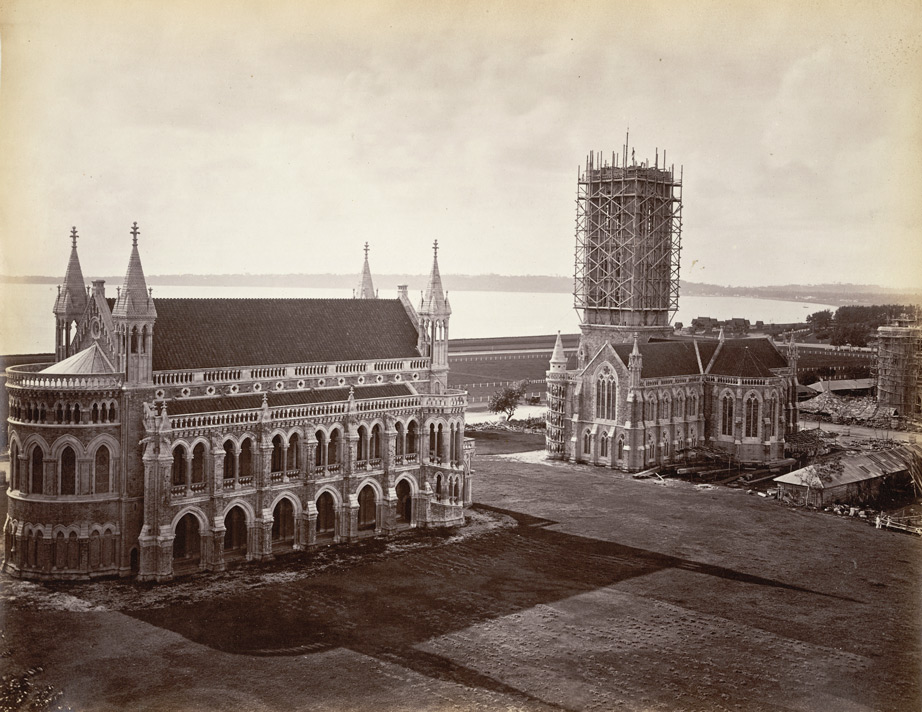
A file photo of University of Bombay's Fort Campus taken in the 1870s

Deepak Kumar argues that British colonial rule during the 19th century did not take adequate measures to help develop Western science and technology in India, instead focusing more on the arts and humanities. Until 1899, only the University of Bombay offered a separate degree in sciences. In that same year, B.Sc. and M.Sc. courses were also supported by the University of Calcutta. By the late 19th century, India had lagged behind in Western science and technology and related education. However, the nobility and aristocracy in India largely continued to encourage the development of both traditional and Western sciences and technical education.

While some science-related subjects were not included in the government curriculum in the 1850s, private institutions also could not offer science courses due to a lack of funds required to establish laboratories and other necessary facilities. The fees for scientific education under British rule were high, and the salaries available in colonial administration were meager, making the prospect of attaining higher education bleak for the native population, who were not employed in high positions within the colonial structure. Even those natives who managed to attain higher education faced discrimination in terms of wages and privileges.

Deepak Kumar argues that the British detachment from the study of Western science in India stemmed from England's gradual decline in science and technology compared to its European rival, Germany, and the rapidly growing United States. As a result, the prospects of the British Raj adopting a world-class science policy for its colonies increasingly diminished. However, Kumar notes the British turn towards professional education during the 1860s, as well as French initiatives aimed at raising awareness of science and technology in their colonies.

=== Native states ===
In 1906, the Maharaja of Baroda State introduced measures to implement compulsory primary education for both sexes in his territory. Schools were built, and parents were fined or occasionally imprisoned for non-attendance where schools existed. This program tripled the kingdom's literacy rate from 9% to 27% between 1906 and 1939 and resulted in primary school provision for approximately 80% of the target population by the end of the period.

== Post-independence ==
=== India ===
The first Indian Institutes of Technology (IITs) were established in the 1950s to promote technical education in India. Today, there are 23 IITs in the country, which are considered the premier engineering universities.

The Sarva Shikhsha Abhiyan aims to provide free and compulsory education as a fundamental right to children between the ages of 6 and 14. The Right to Education Act was passed in 2009.

=== Pakistan ===
For centuries, Pakistan has had an elaborate network of religious educational institutions known as madrasahs or maralsts. These institutions have faced criticism from both political elites and religious scholars for their conservatism and resistance to change.

In the early 1970s, President Ali Bhutto imposed a new educational policy that nationalized all private educational institutions and placed greater emphasis on "agro-technical" education. The Bhutto government established a large number of rural and urban schools, including around 6,500 elementary schools, 900 middle schools, 407 high schools, 51 intermediate colleges, and 21 junior colleges. At the top of this system, he created Quaid-i-Azam University and the nationwide Allama Iqbal Open University, based in Islamabad, as well as Gomal University in Dera Ismail Khan in 1973.

== See also ==
- List of universities in India
- Indian physical culture
- Akhara
- Dera
- Satsang
- Ashram
- Pathasala
- Gurukula
