= Ambal Brahmapureeswarar Temple =

Coordinates: 10.9169736°N 79.6808338°E

Religion
- Affiliation: Hinduism
- District: Tiruvarur
- Deity: Shiva as Brahmapureeswarar

Location
- Location: Ambal
- State: Tamil Nadu
- Country: India
- Interactive map of Ambal Brahmapureeswarar Temple

Architecture
- Type: Dravidian architecture

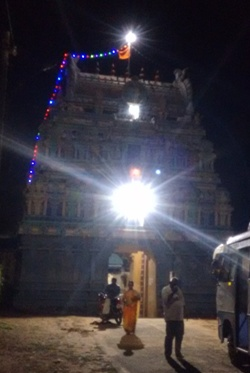
The entrance of the temple

Ambal Brahmapureeswarar Temple(அம்பல் பிரமபுரீசுவரர் கோயில்) is a Hindu temple located at Ambal in Tiruvarur district, Tamil Nadu, India. Now the place is known as Koilpatthu. The historical name of the place is Punnakavanam. The presiding deity Shiva is worshipped as Brahmapureeswarar and his consort Parvati as Poonguzhalammai. Ampal Brahmapureeswarar is revered in the 7th century Tamil Saiva canonical workTevaram and classified as Paadal Petra Sthalam, the 275 temples revered in the canon. The temple is believed to be the last among the sixty maadakoil built by Kochengat Chola.

The temple has a three-tiered rajagopuram, the entrance tower and all the shrines are enclosed in rectangular walls. The temple has four daily rituals at various times from 6:00 a.m. to 8 p.m., and three yearly festivals on its calendar, namely Margazhi Tiruvathirai during the Tamil month of Margazhi (December - January), Kodabisheakam during Chittirai (April - May) and Aipassi Annabishekam during Aippassi (October - November) being the most prominent. The temple is maintained and administered by the Hindu Religious and Endowment Board of the Government of Tamil Nadu.

== Legend ==
As per Hindu legend, the god Brahma was cursed by Shiva to be a swan. He worshipped Shiva in the temple to regain his original form. Brahma is believed to have been propitiated from his curse, after having taken a holy dip in Annam Poigai, the temple tank, before worshipping Shiva. As per another legend, Ganesha in the temple is known as Patikkacupu Pillayar as he is believed to have offered a padi (a measuring tool) to the ruling king of the region named Nantan during a famine. Shiva is also believed to have been worshiped by the love-god Kamadeva.

== Significance ==
It is one of the shrines of the 275 Paadal Petra Sthalams - Shiva Sthalams glorified in the early medieval Tevaram poems by Tamil Saivite Nayanar Tirugnanasambandar.

== Literary mention ==
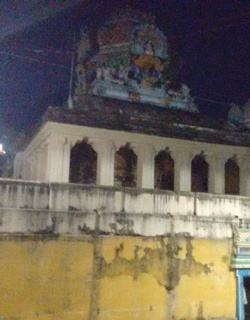
Vimana of the presiding deity

Tirugnanasambandar describes the feature of the deity as:

சங்கணி குழையினர் சாமம் பாடுவர்

வெங்கனல் கனல்தர வீசி யாடுவர்
அங்கணி விழவமர் அம்பர் மாநகர்ச்

செங்கண்நல் இறைசெய்த கோயில் சேர்வரே.
