= Madhuvaneswarar Temple =

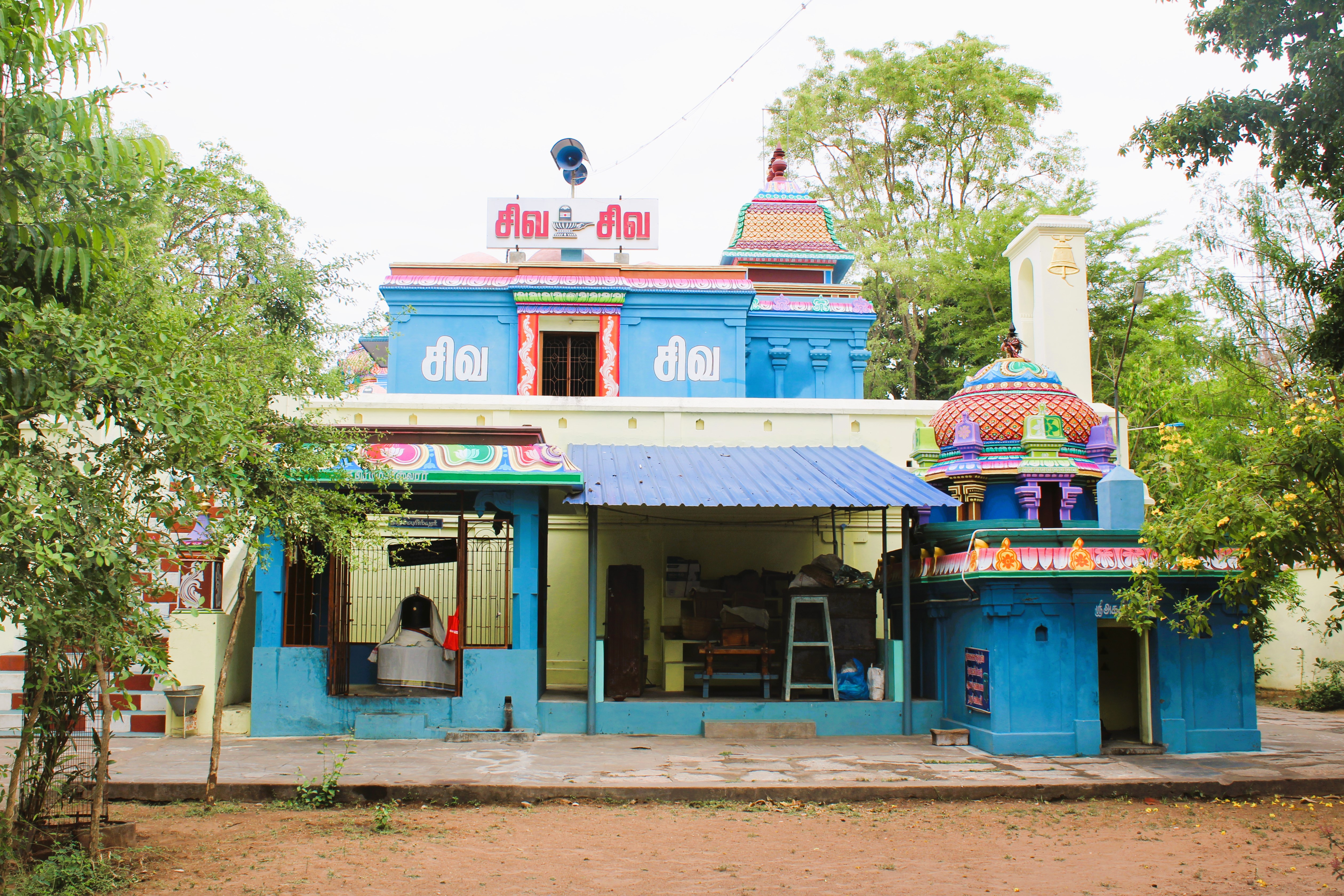

- Location in Tamil Nadu

Religion
- Affiliation: Hinduism
- District: Tiruvarur
- Deity: Madhuvaneswarar(Shiva) Maduvaenswari(Parvathi)

Location
- Location: Nannilam
- State: Tamil Nadu
- Country: India
- Coordinates: 10°52′45″N 79°36′47″E

Architecture
- Type: Dravidian architecture

The Madhuvaneswarar Temple (Tamil: மதுவனேஸ்வரர் கோயில்) is a Hindu temple situated in the town of Nannilam in the Tiruvarur district of Tamil Nadu, India. The presiding deity is Shiva. The temple is believed to have been built by the Early Chola king Kocengannan. It is one of the shrines of the 275 Paadal Petra Sthalams.

== Architecture ==
Nanillam is one of the many temple towns in the state which is named after the grooves, clusters or forests dominated by a particular variety of a tree or shrub and the same variety of tree or shrub sheltering the presiding deity. The region is believed to have been covered with Madhu forest and hence called Madhuvanam. The temple covers an area of 270 X 130 square feet. The gopura is 30 feet tall and faces east. There are shrines to Ganesha, Murugan, Bhairava, Surya and the Navagrahas.

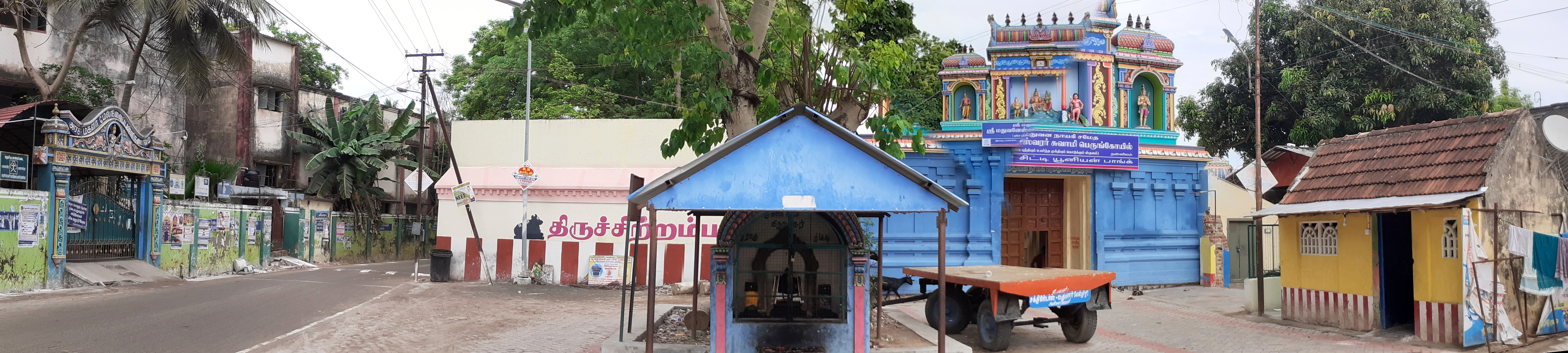
Panoramic view of the temple

== Literary mention and religious importance ==
Appar, the 7th-century Tamil Shivite saint poet and nayanar has revered Madhuvaneswarar and the temple in his verses in Tevaram, compiled as the Fifth Tirumurai. As the temple is revered in Tevaram, it is classified as Paadal Petra Sthalam, one of the 276 temples that find mention in the Saiva canon. Sundarar has glorified the temple in nine poems referring the place as Madhuvanam and the deity as "Madhuvaneswararar". The temple is counted as one of the temples built on the banks of River Kaveri.

The temple is maintained and administered by the Hindu Religious and Charitable Endowments Department of the Government of Tamil Nadu.
