= List of legendary early Chola kings =

History of early Chola rulers

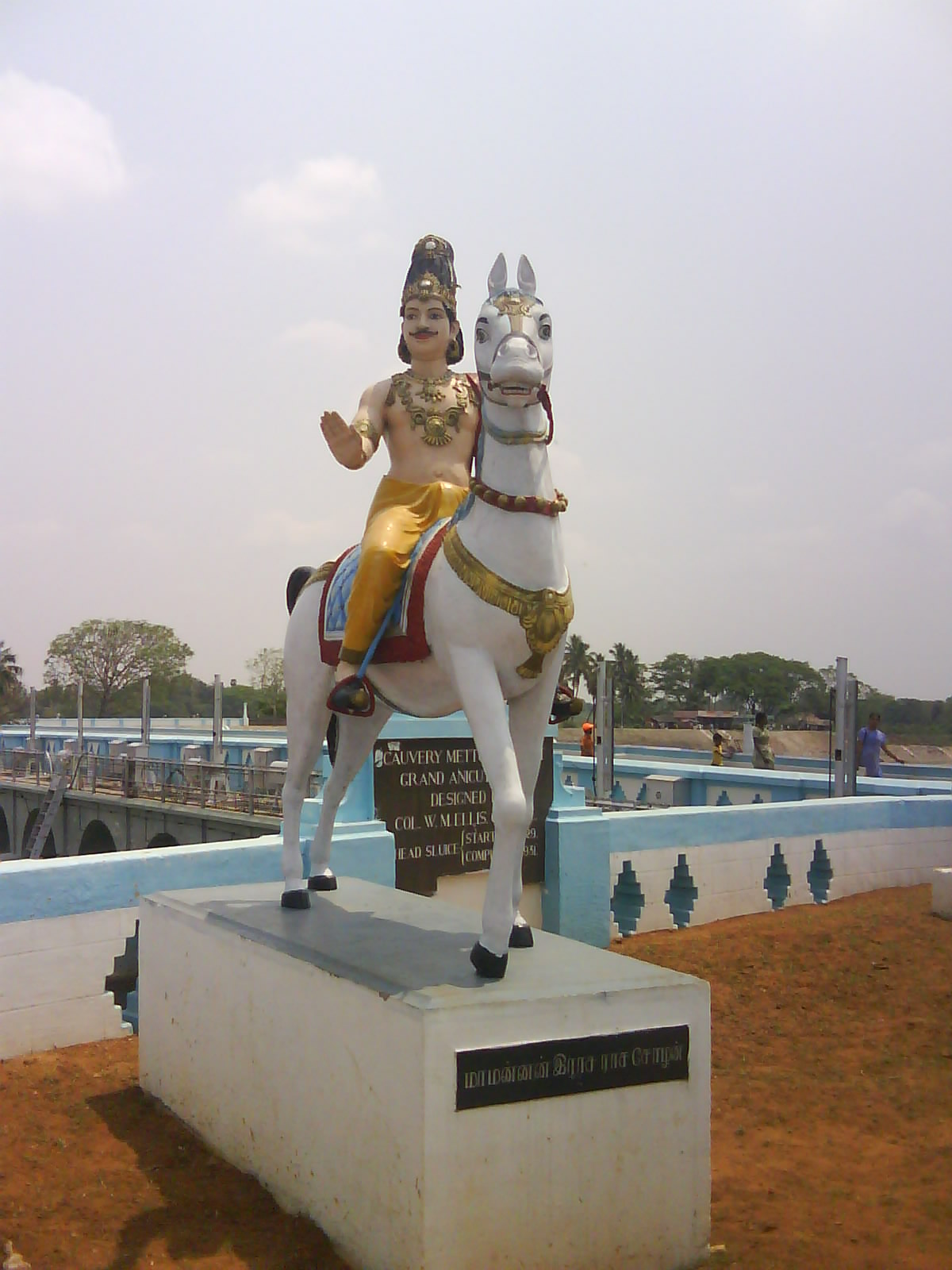
Modern statue devoted to Great Karikala Chola

The legendary early Chola kings are recorded history of early Chola rulers of Sangam period in Tamil literature and Sangam literature. The other source of early Chola history is found in the inscriptions left by later Chola kings.

== Sources of early Chola history ==
The genealogy of the Chola kings as found in Tamil literature and in the many inscriptions left by the later Chola kings. It contain records of kings for whom no verifiable historic evidence survives. Many versions of this lineage exist. The main source is the Sangam literature – particularly, religious literature such as Periyapuranam, semi-biographical poems of the later Chola period such as the temple and cave inscriptions and left by medieval Cholas.

Irrespective of the source, no list of the kings has a strong evidentiary basis and, while they generally are similar to each other, no two lists are identical. Some historians consider these lists as comprehensive conglomerations of various Hindu deities and Puranic characters attributed to local chieftains and invented ancestry of dynasty attempting to re-establish their legitimacy and supremacy in a land they were trying to conquer.

=== Origin of Cholas and Literary sources ===
Typical hero and demi-gods found their place in the ancestry claimed by the later Cholas in the genealogies incorporated into the copper-plate charters and stone inscription of the tenth and eleventh centuries. The earliest version of this is found in the Kilbil Plates which give fifteen names before Chola including the genuinely historical ones of Karikala, Perunarkilli and Kocengannan. The Thiruvalangadu Plates swells this list to forty-four, and the Kanya Plates lists fifty-two. The Thiruvilandur Copper Plate gives only eight mythological kings, as only eighty five of the original eighty six plates have survived.

The Cholas were looked upon as descended from the Solar dynasty. The Puranas speak of a Chola king, a supposed contemporary of the sage Agastya, whose devotion brought the river Kavery into existence.

The story of king Manu Needhi Cholan tells of how he sentenced his son to death for having accidentally killed a calf. He was called thus because he followed the rules of Manu; his real name is not mentioned and is thought to be "Ellalan" according to Maha vamsam who was attributed with a similar story. King Shibi rescued a dove from a hunter by giving his own flesh to the hungry and poor hunter and was also part of the legends. King Shivi was also called Sembiyan, a popular title assumed by a number of Chola kings.

== Sangam period Chola rulers ==
The Chola kings of the Sangam period and the life of people contributed much to Tamil cultural wealth. The Sangam literature is full of legends about Chola kings. However, no evidentiary basis supports this list of Kings either by way of inscriptions or by way of literary evidence (even in Sangam literature). The dates of accession are approximate interpolation of the Chronological standpoints in Tamil history.

List of Sangam Chola rulers till 250s CE–

List of early (Sangam Period) Chola rulers
Ruler	Reign
Eri Oliyan Vaendhi	c. 3020 BCE
Maandhuvaazhi	c. 2980 BCE
El Mei Nannan	c. 2945 BCE
Keezhai Kinjuvan	c. 2995 BCE
Vazhisai Nannan	c. 2865 BCE
Mei Kiyagusi Aerru	c. 2820 BCE
Aai Kuzhi Agusi Aerru	c. 2810 BCE
Thizhagan Maandhi	c. 2800 BCE
Maandhi Vaelan	c. 2770 BCE
Aai Adumban	c. 2725 BCE
Aai Nedun Jaet Chozha Thagaiyan	c. 2710 BCE
El Mei Agguvan "a.k.a" Keezh Nedu Mannan	c. 2680 BCE
Mudiko Mei Kaalaiyam Thagaiyan	c. 2650 BCE
Ilangok Keezh Kaalaiyan Thagaiyan "a.k.a." Ilangeezh Nannan — Kadamba lineage started by his brother Aai Keezh Nannan	c. 2645 BCE
Kaalaiyan Gudingyan	c. 2630 BCE
Nedun Gaalayan Dhagayan	c. 2615 BCE
Vaengai Nedu Vael Varaiyan	c. 2614 BCE
Vaet Kaal Kudingyan	c. 2600 BCE
Maei Ila Vael Varaiyan	c. 2590 BCE
Sibi Vendhi	c. 2580 BCE
Paru Bonji Chaamazhingyan	c. 2535 BCE
Vaeqratrtri Chembiya Chozhan	c. 2525 BCE
Saamazhi Chozhiya Vaelaan	c. 2515 BCE
Uthi Ven Gaalai Thagan	c. 2495 BCE
Nannan That Kaalai Thagan	c. 2475 BCE
Vel Vaen Mindi	c. 2445 BCE
Nedun Jembiyan	c. 2415 BCE
Nedu Nonji Vendhi	c. 2375 BCE
Maei Vael Paqratrtri	c. 2330 BCE
Aai Perun Thoan Nonji	c. 2315 BCE
Kudiko Pungi	c. 275 BCE
Perun Goep Poguvan	c. 2250 BCE
Koeth Thatrtri	c. 2195 BCE
Vadi Sembiyan	c. 2160 BCE
Aalam Poguvan	c. 2110 BCE
Nedun Jembiyan	c. 2085 BCE
Perum Paeyar Poguvan	c. 2056 BCE
Kadun Jembiyan	c. 2033 BCE
Nedun Kathan	c. 2015 BCE
Paru Nakkan	c. 1960 BCE
Vani Sembiyan	c. 1927 BCE
Udha Chira Mondhuvan	c. 1902 BCE
Perun Kaththan	c. 1875 BCE
Kadun Kandhalan	c. 1860 BCE
Nakka Monjuvan	c. 1799 BCE
Maarko Vael Maandhuvan Aaththikko	c. 1786 BCE
Musukunthan Vaendhi	c. 1753 BCE
Peru nakkan Thatrtri	c. 1723 BCE
Vaer Kaththan	c. 1703 BCE
Ambalaththu Irumundruvan	c. 1682 BCE
Kaari Mondhuvan	c. 1640 BCE
Vennakkan Thatrtri	c. 1615 BCE
Maarko Chunthuvan	c. 1565 BCE
Vaer Parunthoan Mundruvan	c. 1520 BCE
Udhan Kaththan	c. 1455 BCE
Kaariko Sunthuvan	c. 1440 BCE
Vendri Nungunan	c. 1396 BCE
Mondhuvan Vendhi	c. 1376 BCE
Kaandhaman	c. 1359 BCE
Mundruvan Vendhi	c. 1337 BCE
Kaandhaman	c. 1297 BCE
Monjuvan Vendhi	c. 1276 BCE
Ani Sembiyan	c. 1259 BCE
Nungunan Vendhi	c. 1245 BCE
Maarkop Perum Cenni	c. 1229 BCE
Monjuvan Nanvendhi	c. 1180 BCE
Kopperunar chenni	c. 1170 BCE
Monthuvan Jembiyan	c. 1145 BCE
Narchenni	c. 1105 BCE
Caet Chembiyan	c. 1095 BCE
Nakkar Chenni	c. 1060 BCE
Parun Jembiyan	c. 1045 BCE
Venjenni	c. 998 BCE
Musugunthan	c. 989 BCE
Maarkop Perun Jembiyan	c. 960 BCE
Nedunjenni	c. 935 BCE
Thatchembiyan	c. 915 BCE
Ambalaththu Iruvaer Chembiyan	c. 895 BCE
Kaariko Chenni	c. 865 BCE
Venvaer Chenni	c. 830 BCE
Kaandhaman	c. 788 BCE
Kaandhalan	c. 721 BCE
Caetchenni	c. 698 BCE
Vani Nungunan	c. 680 BCE
Mudhu Sembiyan Vendhi	c. 640 BCE
Peelan Jembiyach Chozhiyan	c. 615 BCE
Maeyan Gadungo	c. 590 BCE
Thiththan	c. 570 BCE
Perunar Killi Porvaiko	c. 515 BCE
Kadu Mundruvan	c. 496 BCE
Kopperunjozhan	c. 495 BCE
Narkilli Mudiththalai	c. 480 BCE
Thevvango Chozhan	c. 465 BCE
Naran Jembiyan	c. 455 BCE
Nakkam Peela Valavan	c. 440 BCE
Iniyan Rhevvan Jenni	c. 410 BCE
Varcembiyan	c. 395 BCE
Nedun Jembiyan	c. 386 BCE
Nakkan Aran Jozhan	c. 345 BCE
Ambalathu Irungoch Chenni	c. 330 BCE
Perunar Killi	c. 316 BCE
Kochaet Cenni	c. 286 BCE
Cerupazhi Erinda Ilanjaetcenni	c. 275 BCE
Nedungop Perunkilli	c. 220 BCE
Ellalan	c. 205 BCE
Perun Gilli	c. 165 BCE
Kopperun Jozhiyav Ilanjaetcenni	c. 140 BCE
Perunar Killi Mudiththalaiko	c. 120 BCE
Perumpoot Cenni	c. 100 BCE
Ilam Perunjenni	c. 100 BCE
Perungilli Vendhi "aka" Karikaalan I	c. 70 BCE
Nedumudi Killi	c. 35 BCE
Ilavanthigaipalli Thunjiya Maei Nalangilli Caet Cenni	c. 20 BCE
Aai Vaenalangilli	c. 15 BCE
Uruvapakraer Ilanjaetcenni	c. 10 - 16 CE
Kingdom ruled by a series of Uraiyur chieftains	c. 16 – 30 CE
Karikaalan II Peruvalaththaan	c. 31 CE
Vaer Paqradakkai Perunar Killi	c. 99 CE
Perun Thiru Mavalavan "aka" Turaapalli Thunjiya	c. 99 CE
Nalangilli	c. 111 CE
Perunarkilli "aka" Kula Mutrtraththu Thunjiya	c. 120 CE
Perunarkilli "aka" Irasasuya Vaetta	c. 143 CE
Vael Kadunkilli	c. 192 CE
Kochenganaan	c. 220 CE
Nalluruththiran	c. 245 CE

== Genealogy from Chola inscriptions ==
The genealogy of the Chola family conveyed by the Thiruvalangadu copperplate grant consists of names that corroborate the historic authenticity of legends. Some of the mythological Chola kings mentioned in the Thiruvalangadu genealogy are also recorded in the Thiruvilandur Copper Plate.

- Manu
- Ikshvaku
- Vikukshi
- Puranjaya
- Kakutstha
- Kakshivat
- Aryaman
- Analapratapa
- Vena
- Prithu
- Dhundhumara
- Yuvanasva
- Mandhata
- Muchukunda
- Valabha
- Prithulaksha
- Parthivachudamani
- Dirghabahu
- Chandrajit
- Sankriti
- Panchapa
- Satyavrata
- Rudrajit
- Sibi
- Marutta
- Dushyanta
- Bharata
- Cholavarman
- Rajakesarivarman
- Parakesarin
- Chitraratha
- Chitrasva
- Chitradhanvan
- Suraguru (Mrityujit)
- Chitraratha
- Vyaghraketu
- Narendrapati
- Vasu (Uparichara)
- Visvajit
- Perunatkilli
- Chenni - son of Perunatkilli
- Karikala
- Kochchengannan
- Manoratha

== See also ==
- Tamilakam
- Chola Empire
- History of India
- List of Tamil monarchs
- History of Tamil Nadu
- History of South India
- Timeline of Indian history
- Chronology of Tamil history
