= Brahmavadini =

Ancient Indian women writers

In Hindu philosophy, Brahmavadini, are women who strive for the highest philosophical knowledge of Brahman, that is, those who strive for greater universal consciousness. This is opposed to a Sadyovadhu, who is normally a sage's wife, and dedicated to domesticity and the welfare of her family.

The Sanskrit word brahmavadini is the female equivalent of brahmavadi. According to Monier-Williams’s Sanskrit-English Dictionary, "brahmavādín" means ‘discoursing on sacred texts, a defender or expounder of the Veda, one who asserts that all things are to be identified with Brahman’. It doesn't mean "one who speaks like God".

These women seers typically began studying the Vedas at a young age following a spiritual ceremony. Both the Mahābhārata and Rāmāyaṇa depict brahmavādinīs fulfilling both religious and domestic obligations with spiritual strength and physical capability.

== Life of a Brahmavadini ==
To become a brahmavādinī, a young girl entered a gurukula or studied under a designated guru after completing the Yagyopaveet sanskar (sacred thread ritual, a vital rite of passage for youths regardless of gender). Beyond religious education, gurukul training equipped girls with discipline and practical life skills. Post-initiation, these women were permitted to maintain Vedic ritual fires and wore a specialized upper garment or thread on their left shoulder during ceremonies to signify their status. They were not required to take vows of celibacy or live in seclusion, and could enter Grihastha (household phase) after completing their Brahmacharya phase, thus balancing domestic tasks, chores, religious duties, and often public or administrative work. Upon completing their studies, they could either marry or return to live with their parents. During the Brāhmaṇa period (900–700 BCE), brahmavādinī women participated in sacrifices like the Rajasuya and Varuṇapraghāsa.

== Comparison to Rishikas ==
Brahmavadinis are different from Rishikas, or female sages. While Rishikas renounced worldly and marital life in pursuit of spiritual enlightenment, Brahmavadini were permitted to marry if they chose to do so. Thus, while all Rishikas could be regarded as Brahmavadinis, not all Brahmavadinis were Rishikas.

== Notable Brahmavadini ==
Notable Brahmavadini include: Vak Ambhrini, Ila, Lopamudra, Vishwawara, Sikta, Ghosha, Gargi Vachaknavi, and Maitreyi. Figures like Maitreyi and Ghosha are highlighted in the Mahābhārata as respected women of saintly intellect who also excelled in domestic life.

Lopamudra was the wife of the sage Agastya. A hymn in the Rigveda is attributed to her.

Two suktas (hymns) of the tenth Mandala (book) of Rigveda, 39 and 40, each containing 14 verses, have been attributed to Ghosha. The first hymn praises the Ashvins while the second hymn is a personal wish expressing her intimate feelings and desires for married life.

== See also ==
- History of education in the Indian subcontinent
