= Tamil copper-plate inscriptions =

Historical records of Tamil Nadu

Tamil copper-plate inscriptions are copper-plate records of grants of villages, plots of cultivable lands or other privileges to private individuals or public institutions by the members of the various South Indian royal dynasties. The study of these inscriptions has been especially important in reconstructing the history of Tamil Nadu. The grants range in date from the 10th century C.E. to the mid-19th century C.E. A large number of them belong to the pandyas, the Cholas . These plates are valuable epigraphically as they give us an insight into the social conditions of medieval South India; they also help us fill chronological gaps in the connected history of the ruling dynasties. For example, the Leyden grant (so called as they are preserved in the Museum of Leyden in Holland) of Parantaka Chola and those of Parakesari Uttama Chola are among the most important, although the most useful part, i.e., the genealogical section, of the latter's plates seems to have been lost

South Indian inscriptions

Most of the Tamil country inscriptions were written in Tamil, but beginning in the 6th century, both stone and copper-plate inscriptions were written in Sanskrit as well, some being bilingual. Indian archaeologists have discovered hundreds of inscriptions during the last 120 years. Professor E. Hultzsch began collecting South Indian inscriptions systematically from the latter part of 1886 when he was appointed Epigraphist to the Government of Madras.

The earliest of the extant copperplate inscriptions date from the 10th century C.E. Of these, the Leyden plates, the Tiruvalangadu grant of Rajendra Chola I, the Anbil plates of Sundara Chola and the Kanyakumari inscription of Virarajendra Chola are the only epigraphical records discovered and published so far that give genealogical lists of Chola kings.

The Thiruvalangadu copperplates discovered in 1905 C.E. comprise one of the largest so far recovered and contains 31 copper sheets. The Thiruvalangadu plates contain text written in Sanskrit and Tamil. These two seem to have been written at least a decade apart. These plates record a grant made to the shrine of the goddess at Tiruvalangadu by Rajendra Chola I. The list of the legendary Chola kings forms the preamble to the Sanskrit portion of these plates.

Vijaynagar Copper Plate Inscriptions at the Dharmeshwara Temple, Kondarahalli, Hoskote

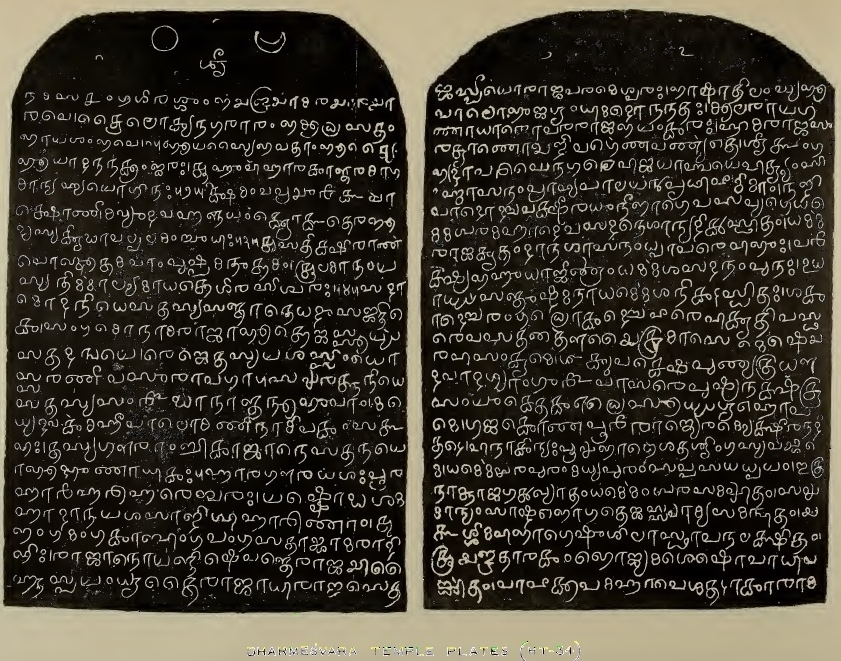
Plate 1 and Back

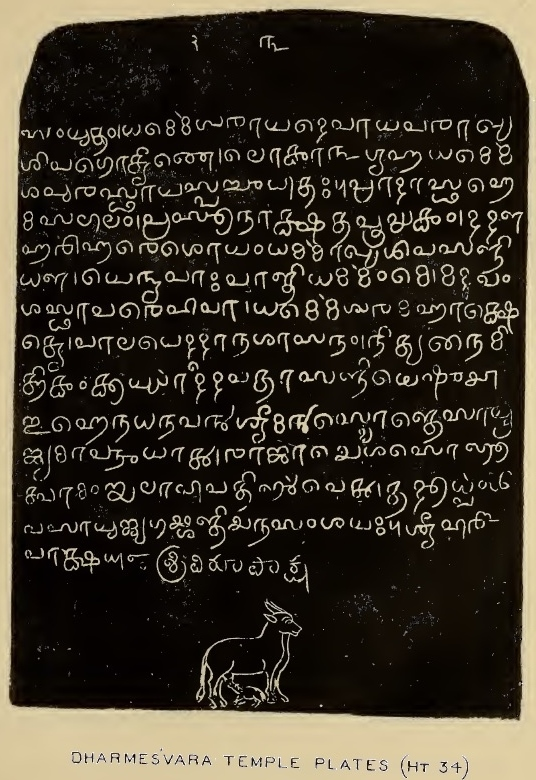
Plate 2

== A Chola inscription ==
A typical Chola copperplate inscription currently displayed at the Government Museum, Chennai, India, is dated c. 10th century C.E. It consists of five copper plates stringed in a copper ring, the ends of which are secured with a Chola seal bearing in relief, a seated tiger facing the right, two fish to the right of this. These three figures have a bow below, a parasol and two fly-whisks (Champaran) at the top and a lamp on each side. Around the margin engraved in Grantha characters, "This is the matchless edict of King Parakesarivarman, who reached justice to the kings of his realm"...

A portion of this inscription is in Sanskrit and the rest is in Tamil.

The plates contain an edict issued by the Chola king Ko-Para-Kesarivarman alias Uththama Chola, at Kachhippedu (Kanchipuram) at the request of his minister, to confirm the contents of a number of stone inscriptions, which referred to certain dues to be paid to the temple of Vishnu at Kachhippedu. Arrangements made for the several services in the temple are also described.

Uththama Chola was an uncle and predecessor of Rajaraja Chola I.

Thiruvilandur Copper Plate a royal land-grant charter of the medieval Chola dynasty, issued during the reigns of Rajadhiraja Chola I and his younger brother Rajendra Chola II. The copper-plate inscription was discovered on 20 May 2010 at Kazhukani Muttam, a hamlet of Thiruvilandur (also spelled Tiruvindalur or Thiruindalur) near Mayiladuthurai. The areological material were kept at Government Museum in Chennai for preservation and study.

Anaimangalam Chola plates refers to the donation charter issued by King Rajendra I consisting of twenty-one copper plates on a bronze ring with the royal seal, dating from between 1012 and 1042.

== See also ==
- Indian copper plate inscriptions
- Indian inscriptions
- Laguna Copperplate Inscription
- Tamil bell
- Tamil inscriptions of Bangalore
- Vatteluttu
