= King Rajendra I Chola Charter =

Charter on copper plates by King Rajendra I of the Chola Empire, between 1012 and 1042.

- Donation charter issued by king Rājendra Chola I Or. 1687
- Created: between 1012 and 1042
- Location: As of May 2026 to be sent to the Archaeological Survey of India (ASI), New Delhi. Formerly at Leiden University Library (Academisch Historisch Museum (nl))
- Commissioned by: King Rājendra I
- Media type: 21 copper plates on a bronze ring, circa 54 x 38 cm
- Subject: Genealogy of Chola dynasty, achievements of Rājendra I's father King Rājarāja I (reigned 985 - circa 1014)

King Rajendra I Chola Charter (also known as Anaimangalam Chola plates and Leiden copper plates) refers to the donation charter issued by King Rajendra I of the Indian and Southeast Asian Chola Empire, consisting of twenty-one copper plates on a bronze ring with the royal seal, dating from between 1012 and 1042.

== Object and history ==
The size of the object is circa 54 × 38 cm, with copper plates of circa 35 × 12 cm, and inscriptions in Sanskrit on 5 plates, and in Tamil on the remaining 16 plates. Florentius Camper, a Dutch minister in Batavia in 1703–1712, had obtained the plates which by inheritance and marriage came in the possession of Dutch orientalist professor Hendrik Arent Hamaker. His heirs donated the charter in 1862 to Leiden University Library. In 2024 the Indian government initiated diplomatic motions to return the charter from Leiden to India through the UNESCO committee. Subsequently, acting on the advice of the Dutch Colonial Collections Committee (Dutch: Commissie Koloniale Collecties), Leiden University decided in 2026 to return the Chola Plates to India. As of May 2026, this cultural heritage piece will be restituted to the Archaeological Survey of India (ASI) in New Delhi, which will decide whether the plates will be exhibited to the public in India.

== Content ==
Royal seal on the bronze ring of the charter issued by king Rājendra Chola I, between 1012 and 1042. The seal features a tiger seated in front of two vertical fishes.

The first five copper plates expound the genealogy of the Chola dynasty starting with a mythical solar ancestor Manu, the son of Ahimakara (the sun, Surya), after an invocation of the Hindu god Vishnu, all in Sanskrit in Grantha script. The other sixteen plates in Tamil relate the donation by Rajaraja I (reigned 985 - circa 1014), the father of Rajendra I, of the whole proceeds of paddy from the land assessment of a village to a Buddhist monastery (Vihāra) in Nagapattinam on the Coromandel Coast, founded by the Malay king Chulamanivarman (Cudamani Warmadewa) of Sriwijaya.

King Rajendra I Chola Charter
Description	Start of the text	Translation
First copper plate, first side, with a Sanskrit inscription	Svasti Śrī உ Laksmī-pīna-payōdhara-dvaya-tatī-kāśmīra-paṁk-āṁkitā...	Hail! Prosperity! May the arms of Sarngin [Vishnu] of the harinila-blue body (increase greatly your prosperity)...
Sixth copper plate, first side, the first with a Tamil inscription.	Svasti śri உ Konerinmaikoṇḍān Kahatriyaśikhāmaṇi-vaḷanāṭṭu pPaṭṭana-kkūrrrattu...	Hail! Prosperity! (This is the order of) Kōnērinmaikoṇḍān (issued) to the nāṭṭār (the members of the Divisional Assembly) of Paṭṭaṇa-kūrram...

== See also ==
- Thiruvilandur Copper Plate
- Charter photos at Wikimedia Commons, pdf.
- Chola Empire
- Indian copper plate inscriptions
- Repatriation (cultural property)
- Tamil copper-plate inscriptions
