= Maitreyi =

Vedic philosopher from ancient India

Maitreyi (fl. 8th century BCE) was an Indian philosopher who lived during the later Vedic period in ancient India. She is mentioned in the Brihadaranyaka Upanishad as one of two wives of the Vedic sage Yajnavalkya. In the Hindu epic Mahabharata and the Gṛhyasūtras, however, Maitreyi is described as an Advaita philosopher who never married. In ancient Sanskrit literature, she is known as a brahmavadini (an expounder of the Veda).

Maitreyi appears in ancient Indian texts, such as in a dialogue where she explores the Hindu concept of Atman (soul or self) in a dialogue with Yajnavalkya in the Brihadaranyaka Upanishad. According to this dialogue, love is driven by a person's soul, and Maitreyi discusses the nature of Atman and Brahman and their unity, the core of Advaita philosophy. This Maitreyi-Yajnavalkya dialogue is the topic of Sureshvara's varttika, a commentary.

Maitreyi is cited as an example of the educational opportunities available to women in Vedic India, and their philosophical achievements. She is considered as a symbol of Indian intellectual women, and an educational institution (Maitreyi College) is named in her honour in New Delhi.

== Biographical information ==
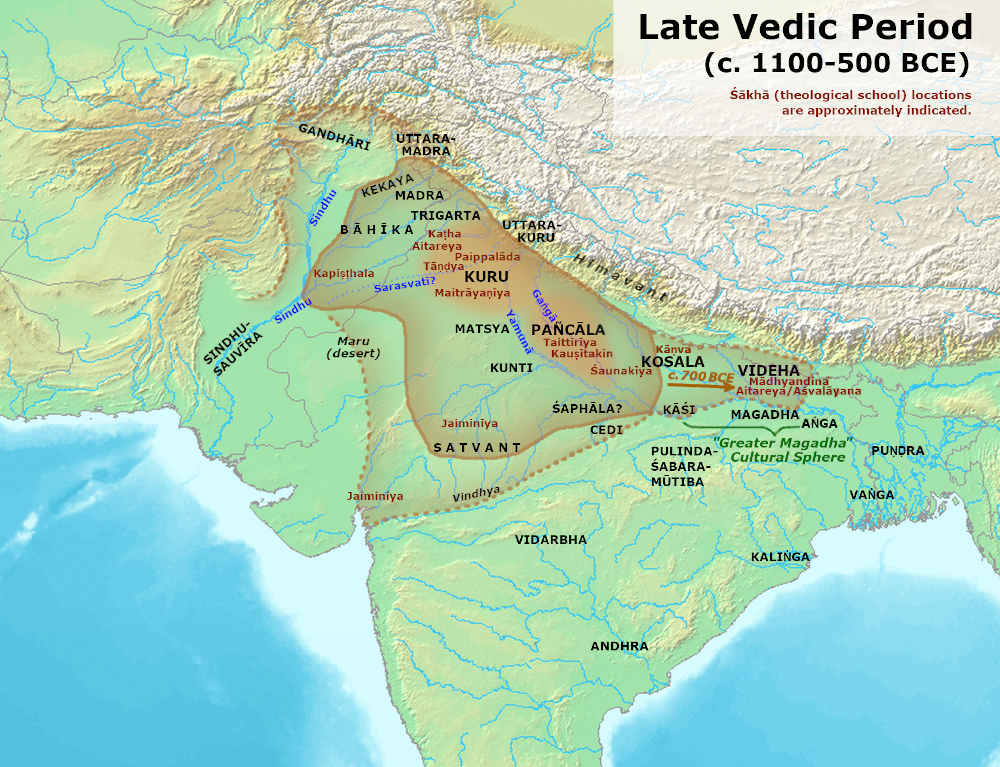
Maitreyi, mentioned in Vedic texts, is believed to be from the Mithila region of eastern India.

In the Asvalayana Gṛhyasūtra, the daughter of the sage Maitri is referred to as Sulabha Maitreyi and is mentioned in the Gṛhyasūtras with several other women scholars of the Vedic era. Her father, who lived in the Kingdom of the Videhas, Mithila, was a minister in the court of King Janaka.

In the fifth section of the fourth book of the Brihadaranyaka Upanishad, Maitreyi is described as an Advaita philosopher, married to the sage Yajnavalkya in the time of Janaka, and estimated to have lived around the 8th century BCE. In the Brihadaranyaka Upanishad, Maitreyi is described as Yajnavalkya's scholarly wife; his other wife, Katyayani, was described as someone who had 'woman's knowledge', which, pragmatically speaking, amounted to a housewife. While Yajnavalkya and Katyayani lived in contented domesticity, Maitreyi studied metaphysics and engaged in theological dialogues with her husband in addition to "making self-inquiries of introspection".

The Mahabharata describes a Sulabha Maitreyi, who may be the same Maitreyi from the Upanishads, as a woman who never marries. Maitreyi explains Advaita philosophy (monism) to Janaka and is described as a lifelong ascetic. She is called a brahmavadini (a female expounder of the Veda) in ancient Sanskrit literature. Shyam Ranganathan argues that her description as a brahmavadini suggests that 'she may have been independently successful as a philosopher and teacher' which could have led her to inquire about immortality rather than settle for Yajnavalkya's wealth as she was not in need of it.

== Maitreyi-Yajnavalkya dialogue ==
Maitreyi explores the Hindu concept of Atman (soul or self) in a dialogue contained in the Brihadaranyaka Upanishad. The dialogue, also called the Maitreyi-Yajnavalkya dialogue, states that love is driven by a person's soul, and it discusses the nature of Atman and Brahman and their unity, the core of Advaita philosophy.

This dialogue appears in several Hindu texts; the earliest is in chapter 2.4 – and modified in chapter 4.5 – of the Brihadaranyaka Upanishad, one of the principal and oldest Upanishads, dating from approximately 700 BCE. The Maitreyi-Yajnavalkya dialogue has survived in two manuscript recensions from the Madhyamdina and Kanva Vedic schools; although they have significant literary differences, they share the same philosophical theme.

After Yajnavalkya achieved success in the first three stages of his life – brahmacharya (as a student), grihastha (with his family) and vanaprastha (in retirement) – he wished to become a sannyasi (a renunciant) in his old age. He asked Maitreyi for permission, telling her that he wanted to divide his assets between her and Katyayani. Maitreyi said that she was not interested in wealth, since it would not make her "immortal", but wanted to learn about immortality:

Then said Maitreyi: "If now, Sir, this whole earth filled with wealth were mine, would I be immortal thereby?"
"No", said Yajnavalkya. "As the life of the rich, even so would your life be. Of immortality, however, there is no hope through wealth."
Then said Maitreyi: "What should I do with that through which I may not be immortal? What you know, Sir – that, indeed, tell me!"
Yajnavalkya replied to Maitreyi: "Ah! Lo, dear as you are to us, dear is what you say! Come sit down. I will explain to you. But while I am expounding, do seek to ponder thereon."

— Brihadaranyaka Upanishad 2.4.2–4

In the dialogue which follows, Yajnavalkya explains his views on immortality in Atman (soul), Brahman (ultimate reality) and their equivalence. Maitreyi objects to parts of Yajnavalkya's explanation, and requests clarification.

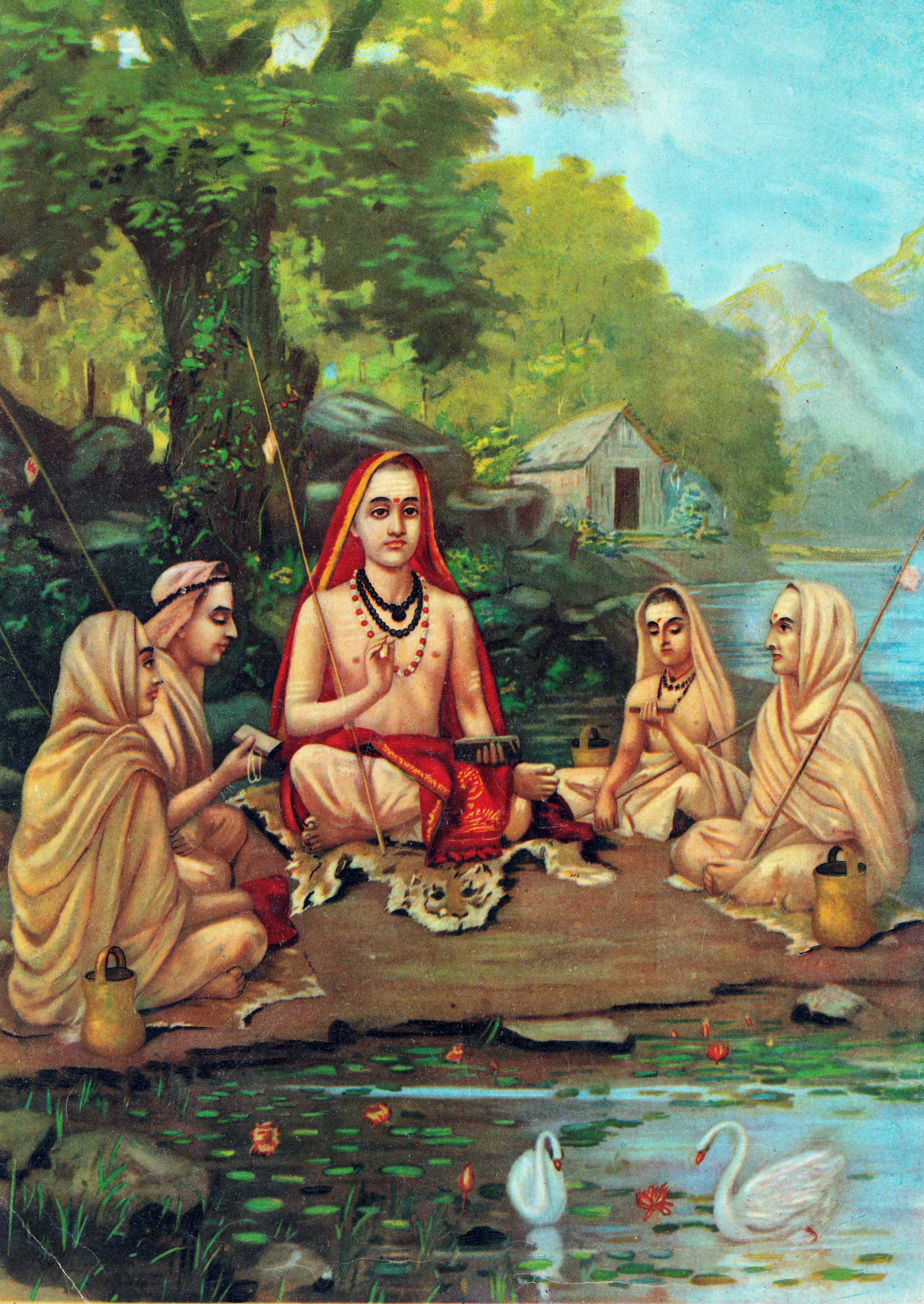
Adi Shankara with his four foremost disciples, including Sureshvara; both wrote commentaries on the Maitreyi-Yajnavalkya dialogue from the Brihadaranyaka Upanishad.

=== Gender ===
Scholars have differing views on whether this dialogue is evidence that in ancient Vedic tradition women were accepted as active participants in spiritual discussions and as scholars of Brahman. Wendy Doniger, an Indologist and a professor of History of Religions, states that in this dialogue Maitreyi is not portrayed as an author, but is part of an Upanishadic story of a Brahmin with two wives who are distinguished by their intellect. Karen Pechelis, another American Indologist and a professor of Comparative Religion, in contrast, states that Maitreyi is portrayed as theologically minded, as she challenges Yajnavalkya in this dialogue and asks the right questions.

First-millennium Indian scholars, such as Sureshvara (Suresvaracharya, c. 750 CE), have viewed this male-female dialogue as profound on both sides; Maitreyi refuses wealth, wishing to share her husband's spiritual knowledge, and in the four known versions of the Upanishadic story she challenges Yajnavalkya's theory of Atman. Yajnavalkya acknowledges her motivations, and recognizes that her questions are evidence that she is a seeker of ultimate knowledge and a lover of the Atman.

=== Renunciation ===
The Maitreyi dialogue in the Upanishad is significant beyond being a gauge of gender relations. Adi Shankara, a scholar of the influential Advaita Vedanta school of Hindu philosophy, wrote in his Brihadaranyakopanishad bhashya that the purpose of the Maitreyi-Yajnavalkya dialogue in chapter 2.4 of the Brihadaranyaka Upanishad is to highlight the importance of the knowledge of Atman and Brahman, and to understand their oneness. According to Shankara, the dialogue suggests renunciation is prescribed in the Sruti (vedic texts of Hinduism), as a means to gain knowledge of the Brahman and Atman. He adds, that the pursuit of self-knowledge is considered important in the Sruti because the Maitreyi dialogue is repeated in chapter 4.5 as a "logical finale" to the discussion of Brahman in the Upanishad.

=== Nature of love ===
The Maitreyi-Yajnavalkya dialogue includes a discussion of love and the essence of whom one loves, suggesting that love is a connection of the soul and the universal self (related to an individual):

Lo, verily, not for love of a husband is a husband dear, but for the love of the Self a husband is dear.
Not for the love of the wife is a wife dear, but for love of the Self a wife is dear.

— Brihadaranyaka Upanishad 2.4.2–4

According to theological author and editor Robert Van De Weyer, this asserts that all kinds of love are a reflection of one's own soul: parents' love for their children, love for religion or of the entire world. German Indologist and Oxford University professor Max Müller says that the love described in the Maitreyi-Yajnavalkya dialogue of the Brihadaranyaka Upanishad extends to all aspects of one's life and beyond; in verse 2.4.5, "The Devas (gods) are not dear to one out of love for gods, but because one may love the Self (Atman) that the gods are dear". In the dialogue "the Brahman-class, the Kshatra-class, these worlds, these gods, these beings, everything that is what this Soul is", and when "we see, hear, perceive and know the Self, then all is known".

Concluding his dialogue on the "inner self", or soul, Yajnavalkaya tells Maitreyi:

One should indeed see, hear, understand and meditate over the Self, O Maitreyi;
indeed, he who has seen, heard, reflected and understood the Self – by him alone the whole world comes to be known.

— Brihadaranyaka Upanishad 2.4.5b

After Yajnavalkya leaves and becomes a sannyasi, Maitreyi becomes a sannyassini – she too wanders and leads a renunciate's life.

== Legacy ==
Maitreyi, who is also mentioned in a number of Puranas, "is regarded as one of the most learned and virtuous women of ancient India" and symbolizes intellectual women in India. A college in New Delhi is named after her, as is the Matreyi Vedic Village, a retreat location in Tamil Nadu.

== Bibliography ==
- Ahuja, M. L. (2011). Women in Indian Mythology. New Delhi: Rupa & Co. ISBN 978-81-291-1825-7.
- Bowen, Paul (1998). Themes and issues in Hinduism. Cassell. ISBN 978-0-304-33850-4.
- Brereton, Joel P. (2006). "The Composition of the Maitreyī Dialogue in the Brhadāraṇyaka Upaniṣad". Journal of the American Oriental Society. 126 (3): 323–345. JSTOR 20064512.
- Candrakīrti; Lang, Karen C., transl. (2003). Four Illusions: Candrakīrti's Advice for Travelers on the Bodhisattva Path. New York, N.Y.: Oxford University Press. ISBN 978-0-19-515112-1.
- Deussen, Paul (2010). Sixty Upanishads of the Veda. Motilal Banarsidass. ISBN 978-81-208-1468-4.
- Doniger, Wendy (2010) [First published 2009]. The Hindus: An Alternative History. Oxford University Press. ISBN 978-0-19-959334-7.
- Geaves, Ron (2009). Encyclopedia of Hinduism (Editors: Denise Cush, Catherine Robinson, Michael York). Routledge. ISBN 978-0-415-55623-1.
- Hino, Shoun (1991). Suresvara's Vartika On Yajnavalkya'S-Maitreyi Dialogue (2nd ed.). Motilal Banarsidass. ISBN 978-81-208-0729-7.
- Hume, Robert (1967). Brihadaranyaka Upanishad. (Translator), Oxford University Press.
- Majumdar, Ramesh Chandra (1977). Ancient India (8th ed.). Delhi: Motilal Banarsidass Publishers. ISBN 978-81-208-0436-4.
- Marvelly, Paula (2011). Women of Wisdom. Oxford: Osprey Publishing. ISBN 978-1-78028-367-8.
- Olivelle, Patrick (2008). Upanishads. Oxford University Press. ISBN 978-0-19-954025-9.
- Pechilis, Karen (2004). The Graceful Guru: Hindu Female Gurus in India and the United States. Oxford University Press. ISBN 978-0-19-514537-3.
- Staal, Frits (2008). Discovering the Vedas: Origins, Mantras, Rituals, Insights. Penguin Books India. ISBN 978-0-14-309986-4.
- Weyer, Robert Van De (2013). 366 Readings From Hinduism. Jaico Publishing House. ISBN 978-81-7992-070-1.
