= Kakshivat =

Kakshivat son of Dirghatamas was an ancient vedic sage (rishi). He was called praja (strong). He had his daughter Ghosha as student, who, like her father, composed Vedic verses. His descendants are also called Kakshivatas.

== See also ==
- Anga Kingdom
- Hindu reform movements
