= Perunarkilli =

- Rasasuyam Vetta Perunarkilli
- Reign: Unknown
- Predecessor: Kochchengannan
- Successor: Nalluruththiran
- Born: Unknown
- Died: Unknown
- Queen: Unknown
- Issue: Unknown
- Father: Unknown

Perunarkilli (Tamil: பெருநற்கிள்ளி) was one of the Tamil kings of the Early Cholas mentioned in Sangam Literature. There are no definite details about this Chola or his reign. The only information available is from the fragmentary poems of Sangam in the Purananuru poems.

== Sources ==
The only source available on Perunarkilli is the mentions in Sangam poetry. The period covered by the extant literature of the Sangam is unfortunately not easy to determine with any measure of certainty. Except the longer epics Cilappatikaram and Manimekalai, which by common consent belong to the age later than the Sangam age, the poems have reached us in the forms of systematic anthologies. Each individual poem has generally attached to it a colophon on the authorship and subject matter of the poem, the name of the king or chieftain to whom the poem relates and the occasion which called forth the eulogy are also found.

It is from these colophons and rarely from the texts of the poems themselves, that the names of many kings and chieftains and the poets patronised by them are gathered. The task of reducing these names to an ordered scheme in which the different generations of contemporaries can be marked off one another has not been easy. To add to the confusions, some historians have even denounced these colophons as later additions and untrustworthy as historical documents.

Any attempt at extracting a systematic chronology and data from these poems should be aware of the casual nature of these poems and the wide difference between the purposes of the anthologist who collected these poems and the historian’s attempts are arriving at a continuous history.

== Powerful Monarch ==
Perunarkilli must have been a powerful monarch, as he is the only one among the early Tamil kings of the Sangam age to have performed the rajasuya (royal consecration) sacrifice. It is likely that the Chera king Mari Venko and the Pandya Ugrapperuvaluthi attended this occasion (Purananuru – 367). The Sangam poet Auvaiyar has written this fine benediction.

According to the Thiruvilandur copper-plate charter, the reign of Perunarkilli is described in a panegyric as surpassing that of the heavenly city of Amaravati, (Note: According to the Devī Bhāgavata Purāṇa, Amarāvatī, the city of Indra, is situated on the top of Mount Sumeru.) which the inscription locates on Mount Sumeru.

Nothing is known of the events in this king’s reign. He must have had his share of fighting as inferred from a poem in Purananuru (poem 16) which gives a graphic but conventional description of the havoc wrought by the invading Chola army on the enemy countries.

== See also ==
- Sangam Literature
- Early Cholas
- Legendary early Chola kings
