= Ghosha =

Hindu Sage and Philosopher

Personal life
- Born: India
- Notable work: Two hymns in Rigveda in praise of Ashvini Kumars
- Known for: Poetry
- Other names: Brahmavadini, Proclaimer of Brahman
- Occupation: Religious Philosopher

Religious life
- Religion: Hinduism

Ghosha (Sanskrit: घोषा) was an ancient Vedic period Indian philosopher and seer. From a young age, she suffered from a disfiguring skin ailment. According to legend, Ashvini Kumars cured her and restored her youthfulness, health and beauty. Consequently, she got married and had a son. She was proficient in the Vedas and had even scripted two hymns in the Rigveda. She was called as mantradrika, meaning well versed in mantras. She was also known as a Brahmavadini, a speaker or proclaimer of Brahman, and led a purposeful spiritual life.

== Biography ==
Ghosha was born during the Vedic period in India. Her father was Kakshivat and grandfather was Dīrghatamas, both of them having written hymns in the Rigveda. She suffered from a skin ailment and was confined to the house, attending to her father. According to a hymn, she suffered from leprosy, which had disfigured her. She was thus celibate for a long period. She fervently prayed to Ashvins, the divine physician twins of the time, who were proficient in rejuvenation. According to myth, they taught her Madhu Vidhya, knowledge to restore youth and acquire immense knowledge, to cure her skin ailment. Thus, allegedly, she was cured, and then married. She had a son, Suhstya, who also composed a hymn in the Rigveda.

Ghosha composed two hymns in praise of the Ashvini Kumars which are contained in two suktas (hymns) of the tenth Mandala (book) of Rigveda, chapter X hymns 39 and 40, each containing 14 verses. The first hymn praises the Ashvins. The second hymn is more intimate, expressing her intimate feelings and desires for married life. The two hymns are:

Asvins Your radiant Chariot -whither goes it on its way? Who decks it for you, Heroes, for its happy course starting at daybreak visiting each morning every house, borne hitherward through prayer unto the sacrifice?

Where are you, Asvins, in the evening, where at morn? Where is your halting place, where rest ye for the night? O Heroes, this I beg of you. 'Be near me in the day, be near me in the night'.

== Bibliography ==
- Pandey, B. K. (2008). Encyclopaedia of Indian philosophers. Anmol Publications. ISBN 978-81-261-3524-0.
- Prabhu, Pandharinath H. (1991). Hindu Social Organization: A Study in Socio-psychological and Ideological Foundations. Popular Prakashan. ISBN 978-81-7154-206-2.
- Singh, Achyut Kumar (2008). Edu.& National Character. APH Publishing. ISBN 978-81-313-0277-4.
- Vivekananda, Swami (1954). Awakened India. Swami Smaranananda.
