= Kochchenganan =

Chola Ruler
- Predecessor: Kopperuncholan
- Successor: Perunarkilli
- Dynasty: Chola

Kochchenganan (Kōccengaṇān) Kochengat Cholan or Śengaṇān (also spelt Senganan)(Tamil: சோழன் செங்கணான்) was a monarch of the Early Cholas described in classical Tamil Sangam literature. Contemporary historical details of his reign derive principally from the anthology Purananuru and the martial poem Kaḷavaḻi Nāṟpatu. Later medieval traditions celebrate his as a Shaivite saint (nayanmar) credited with commissioning about seventy elevated Shiva temples (madakkoils), including the Jambukeswarar Temple at Thiruvanaikaval near Tiruchirappalli. Regional folk traditions also link his name to settlements such as Chengannur and Changanassery.

== Sources and historiography ==
The earliest textual references to Kochchenganan occur in Sangam poetic anthologies, specifically verse 74 of the Puṟanāṉūṟu and the forty stanzas of Kaḷavaḻi Nārpatu composed by the court poet Poygaiyar. Later religious traditions appear in the 7th- to 9th-century devotional hymns of Thirugnana Sambanthar, Thirumangai Aazhvaar, and Sundaramoorthy Nayanar, which emphasize his religious patronage.

Kochchenganan is also included in the ancestral genealogies of the 10th- and 11th-century Chola copper-plate grants, such as the Anbil and Thiruvalangadu plates. Narratives describing his mythical reincarnation from a spider into a Chola prince appear in earlier shaivite hymns and are compiled in Sekkizhar's 12th-century hagiography, the Periyapuranam.

Based on internal linguistic evidence in the Kaḷavaḻi Nārpatu and historical references to his contemporaries, historians place Kochchenganan toward the end of the early Sangam period, approximately in the late 4th or 5th century CE. The colophons attached to the anthologies identify him as the victor of Kalumalam. But historians treat these editorial notes with caution because they were compiled several centuries after the original compositions.

== Reign and military campaigns ==
The Kalavazhi Narpathu describes the battle of Kalumalam (near Karur in the Chera country), in which Kochchenganan defeated and captured the Chera monarch Kanaikkal Irumporai. According to literary tradition, the poet Poygaiyar composed forty stanzas praising Kochchenganan's military victory to secure the Chera ruler's release from the Kudavasal prison. Verse 74 of the purananuru, attributed to Kanaikkal Irumporai during his imprisonment, records his refusal of water delayed by his jailers. It declares that a captured monarch should choose death over prolonged humiliation.

== Religious tradition and temple architecture ==
Medieval epigraphy and literature credit Kochchenganan with initiating a distinctive phase of temple architecture. Later Shaivaite and Vaishnavite traditions record that he commissioned about seventy elevated Shiva temples. They were classified as madakkoils (temples built on high plinths inaccessible to elephants).

His most prominent architectural association is the Jambukeswarar Temple at Thiruvanaikaval. Here the inner sanctum is constructed with an intentionally narrow entrance. According to legend, this was designed to prevent elephants from entering. Hymns by Thirumangai Alvar in the Periya Tirumoli also praise him for constructing seventy elevated shrines. Local traditions also associate him with the Kailasanatha Temple in Nagapattinam.

== As a Saiva Saint ==
The Periyapuranam detailing the stories of the 63 Nayanmars of Shaivism, gives the following story regarding Kochchenganan:

In a fruit grove in the Chola country, there was a Siva Lingam under a Jambul tree. A white elephant used to come there daily and worship the Lingam. A spider, which was also devoted to Siva, noticed that dry leaves were falling on the God and to prevent this wove a web above the Lingam.

The next day when the elephant came to worship, he found the web, and, thinking that someone had polluted the place, tore the web, offered his worship and went away. The spider came upon the scene, felt sorry that his web had been destroyed, wove another web and went away. The next day, as the elephant was pulling the web away, the spider, which was present there, gave him a sting: the elephant died of the poison on the spot. The spider, too, was caught in the elephant’s trunk, and perished.

Suba Devan, the Chola king and his wife Kamalavati went to Chidambaram and eagerly prayed to the Lord Nataraja for a son. The Lord granted their wish and caused the spider to be born as the Chola king’s child. Soon Kamalavati conceived the child. The day of delivery arrived. Astrologers foretold that if the child could be delivered a few minutes later, it would rule the three worlds! The queen asked that she should be tied to the roof of the room upside down, with a tight bandage around her waist. When the auspicious time came, she was released and the child was born. This was the spider reborn! The child had red eyes as he had remained in his mother’s womb a little longer. The mother, looking into his eyes, said: ‘Kochekannano’ (the child with red eyes), and expired. Hence, he was named Kochengat Cholan. When he reached the proper age, his father enthroned him king.

Kochengannan used to darshan (worship) Ayyaarappan (Pancha nadheeshwar-Thiruvaiyaaru) everyday in the morning. But one time, due to more water flow in river Kaviri he couldn't cross the river. So, he was sad. At that time the pulikaal munivar (Viyaakra paathar) appeared there and asked him to build a Temple for Ayyaarappan. The Temple was built in the small town Kurumbalur (in Perambalur taluk). The Shiva name in the temple is same 'Pancha nadheeswar' means ayyaarappan in Tamil.

== Thiruvanaikaval Temple ==
Thiruvanaikaval (also Thiruvanaikal) is a famous Shiva temple in Tiruchirapalli (Trichy). The temple was built by Kochchenganan. Also Kailayanathar temple in Nagapattinam was built by him.

== See also ==
- Early Cholas
- Legendary early Chola kings
