= Lopamudra =

Female Hindu sage

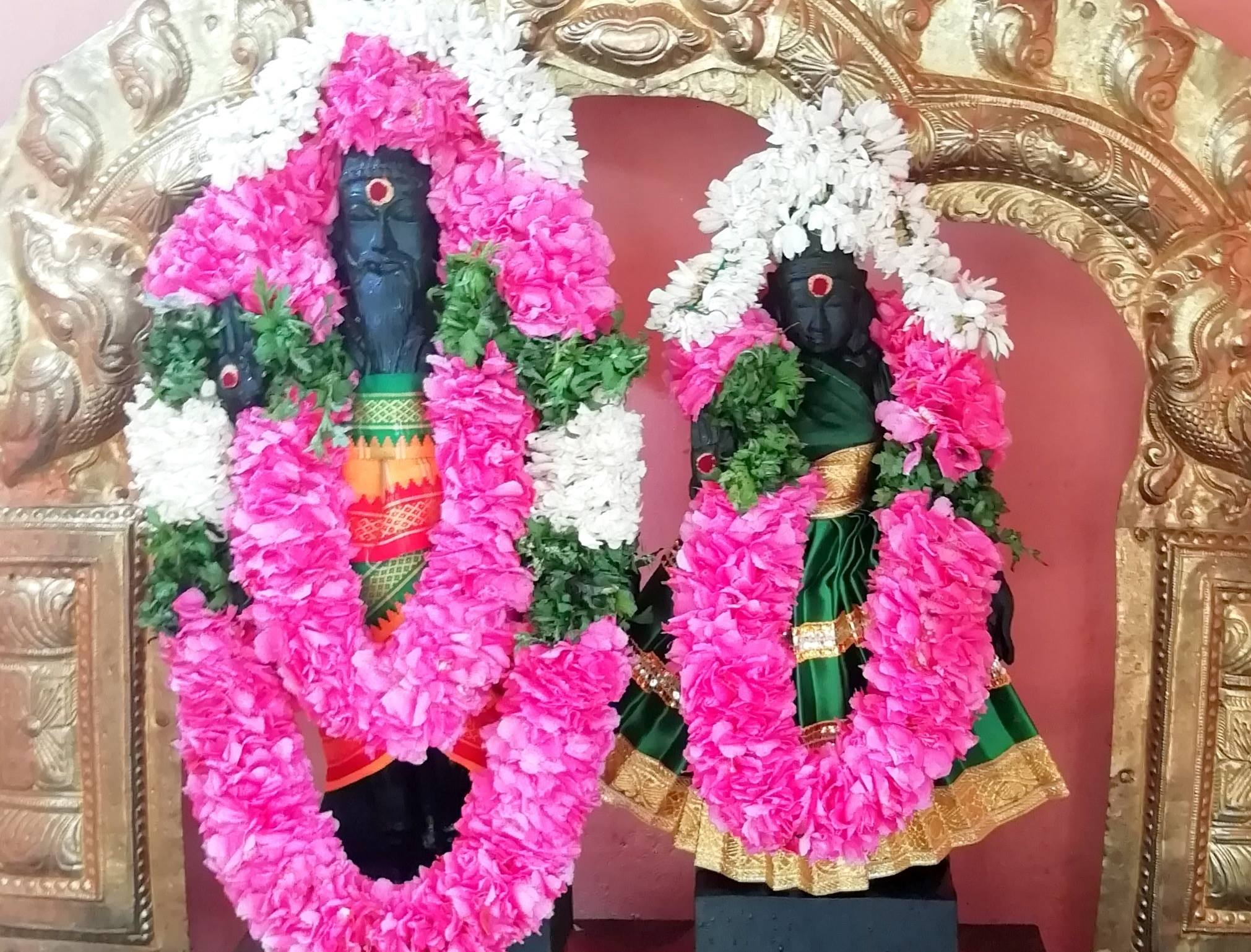
- Agastya & Lopamudra

Personal life
- Spouse: Agastya
- Children: Idhmavāha, Drdhasyu

Religious life
- Religion: Hinduism

Lopamudra, also known as Kaveri, Kaushitaki and Varaprada, was a philosopher according to ancient Vedic Indian literature. She was the wife of the sage Agastya who is believed to have lived in the Rigveda period (1950 BC-1100 BC) as many hymns have been attributed as her contribution to this Veda. She was not only the consort of Agastya but a Rishiki in her own right, as she was the well known Rishiki who visualized the "Hadi Panchadasi" mantra of the Srikul Shakta tradition of Hinduism. She was one of the prominent Brahmavadinis.

There are three versions of Lopamudra's legend; one is in the Rigveda Hymns; the second is in the epic Mahabharata (Vanaparva: Tirtha-yatra Parva), where there is an elaborate version with a mention that Agastya Rishi did penance at Gangadwara (Haridwar), with the help of his wife, Lopamudra (the princess of Vidarbha). According to this legend, Lopamudra was created by sage Agastya with the most graceful parts of animals such as eyes of the deer etc. The third version is Giridhara Ramayana.

== Etymology ==
The name Lopamudra signifies the loss (lopa) that the animals and plants suffered by giving their distinctive beauties (mudra's) when Agastya created her. After creating her, Agastya gave Lopamudra to the King of Vidarbha who was doing penance seeking for a progeny. Agastya had created Lopamudra with the intention of marrying her. The king brought up Lopamudra as his daughter. When she grew up, Agastya demanded her hand in marriage. Lopamudra agreed to marry him and left the King's palace for his hermitage. However, after some time, she grew tired of Agastya's austerity. She wrote hymn in the Rigveda, asking for his attention and love. The hymn made Agastya realize his duties towards his wife. The couple had a son named Drdhasyu, who became a poet.

Together with her husband she is also credited with spreading the fame of the Lalita sahasranama (the thousand names of the Divine Mother). It is also believed that Agastya learnt the hymns of Lalita Sahasranama from Hayagriva who is an avatar of Lord Vishnu.

== In Rigveda ==
In Rigveda, the hymns authored by 27 female rishis or rishikas reflect their success and progress as women intellectuals. These hymns are presented under three headings. The first group has hymns contributed by female rishis only such as by Vishwavara and Apale; Vishwavara's hymn is dedicated to Agni, while Apale's hymn is about Indra. In the second group, some are attributed to female rishis, particularly Lopamudra and Shashiyasi, wife of Taranta. Lopamudra's hymn, hymn number 179 in Book 1, has six verses dedicated to Goddess Rati. Her hymns elaborate on the relationship between husband and wife in order to follow celibacy. The third group of hymns, though attributed to female rishis, are not identified by any author and deal mostly with mythological characters and representation of theoretical qualities. In Rigveda Agastya and Lopamudra are considered as "mantra drashta" (seers who are discoverer of mantras). She is also mentioned in Yajurveda (17:11:36:20) Brihaddevtakara (4:57–59) and in Agama granthas, and hailed as "Mantradrika" (well versed in mantras) in Rigveda.

In the translation of the Sanskrit text of the Rigveda by Ralph T.H. Griffith (1896), the hymns or sutras related to Agastya, Lopamudra and a disciple are titled "Rati" meaning love, which are six verses, two are by Lopamudra, two by Agastya, and the last two are to the credit of the disciple or Agastya. M. Bergaigne has commented that the hymn has mystical meaning, with Agastya identified as the heavenly Soma while Lopamudra represents her feminine attraction which fructifies in getting Agastya out of his "secret dwelling place". It is presented more as a dramatic dialogue between husband and wife with the student commenting his appreciation. The first two verses are expressions of Lopamudra's passion filled approach to her husband, highlighting his old age and his coolness towards her charms.

Six verses of Book 1 Hymn 179 of the Rigveda composed by Lopamudra (Verses 1 &2), Agastya Rishi (verses 3 & 4) and Agastya or a student (Verses 5 & 6)
| Number of Verse | Original Sanskrit Version. | IAST Version | English Translation |
| 1 | परुवीरहं शरदः शश्रमणा दोषा वस्तोरुषसो जरयन्तीः मिनाति शरियं जरिमा तनूनमप्यु नु पत्नीर्व्र्षणो जगम्युः | pruvīrahaṃ śaradaḥ śaśramaṇā doṣā vastoruṣaso jarayantīḥ mināti śriyaṃ jarimā tanūnamapyu nu patnīrvṛṣaṇo jaghamyuḥ | [Lopamudra] For many autumns have I been laboring, evening and morning, through the aging dawns. Old Age diminishes the beauty of bodies. Bullish men should now come to their wives. |
| 2 | ये चिद धि पूर्व रतसाप आसन साकं देवेभिरवदन्न्र्तानि ते चिदवसुर्नह्यन्तमापुः समू नु पत्नीर्व्र्षभिर्जगम्युः | ye cid dhi pūrva ṛtasāpa āsan sākaṃ devebhiravadannṛtāni te cidavasurnahyantamāpuḥ samū nu patnīrvṛṣabhirjaghamyuḥ | [Lopamudra] For even those ancients who served truth and at one with the gods spoke truths, even they got out of harness for they did not reach the end. Wives should now unite with their bullish (husbands) |
| 3 | न मर्षा शरान्तं यदवन्ति देवा विश्वा इत सप्र्धो अभ्यश्नवाव जयावेदत्र शतनीथमजिं यत सम्यञ्चा मिथुनावभ्यजाव | na mṛṣā śrāntaṃ yadavanti devā viśvā it spṛdho abhyaśnavāva jayāvedatra śatanīthamajiṃ yat samyañcā mithunāvabhyajāva | [Agastya] Not in vain is the labor that the gods help. Let us take on all contenders; let us two win here the contest of a hundred stratagems, when a united couple we will drive on |
| 4 | नदस्य मा रुधतः काम आगन्नित आजातो अमुतः कुतश्चित लोपामुद्र वर्षणं नी रिणति धीरमधीर धयति शवसन्तम | nadasya mā rudhataḥ kāma āghannita ājāto amutaḥ kutaścit lopāmudra vṛṣaṇaṃ nī riṇati dhīramadhīra dhayati śvasantam | [Agastya] The lust of a mounting bull has come to me, lust arisen from there, from everywhere. Lopamudra draws the bull to herself: that giddy woman sucks the steadfast man. |
| 5 | इमं न सोममन्तितो हर्त्सु पीतमुप बरुवे यत सीमागश्चक्र्मा तत सु मर्ळतु पुलुकामो हि मर्त्यः | imaṃ n somamantito hṛtsu pītamupa bruve yat sīmāghaścakṛmā tat su mṛḷatu pulukāmo hi martyaḥ | [Student or Agastya] This soma within my heart, just drunk do I adjure, Whatever offense we have committed let him forgive that for of my many desires in mortal man. |
| 6 | अगस्त्यः खनमनः खनित्रैः परजमपत्यं बलमिछमानः उभौ वर्णाव रषिरुग्रः पुपोष सत्या देवेष्वशिषो जगाम | aghastyaḥ khanamanaḥ khanitraiḥ prajamapatyaṃ balamichamānaḥ ubhau varṇāv ṛṣirughraḥ pupoṣa satyā deveṣvaśiṣo jaghāma | Agastya, digging with spades, seeking offspring, descendants, power-- Cherished - a sage of mighty strength - both classes, and with the Gods obtained his prayer's fulfilment. |

Laurie L. Patton interprets Rigveda hymn 79 as representing Lopamudra in a state of "voracious sexuality". Initially resisted by Agastya, finally he is “overwhelmed.” Patton also states that "the final line of the hymn celebrates Agastya as having attained immortality both through children and through ascetic practice, while Lopamudra remains marked by sexual desire". According to Dr. Rameshchandra Mukhopadhyaya, Lopamudra's sutras say that men should go to women. Even the past rishis who attained knowledge of gods enjoyed women and "were never tired of it". Lopamudra's expression of frustration in this verse is a result of Agastya's abstinence from having sex with his wife. Her saying that she has become old is an expression of "pathos." Agastya explains in reply that this restraint was god created. Agastya succumbs to Lopamudra's entreaties and submits to her. In the last two verses the disciple of Agastya glorifies Agastya's "kindred points of love making and penance".

== In Mahabharata ==
The legend of Lopamudra, a mythological female, is the story of Agastya and Lopamudra narrated in the Aranyakaparvan of the epic Mahabharata. This version of the legend is said to be "the glorification of domestic life and family and demonstrates the incompleteness of a life based solely on asceticism."

=== Background ===
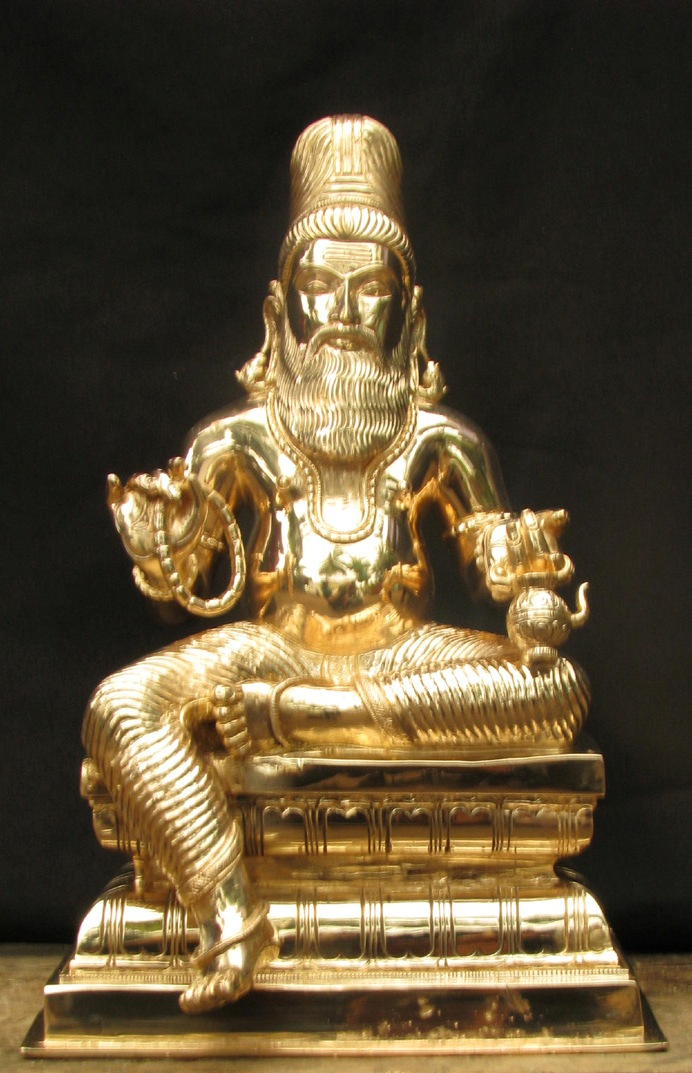
Temple image of Agastya

The background to Agastya and Lopamudra's legend in the Mahabharata starts with the asura brothers Ilvala and Vatapi of the region of Manismati. It is also said that they hailed from Badami in Karnataka, South India. Ilvala requested a learned Brahmin to bless him with a son who would be as powerful as Indra. As this did not materialize Ilvala and his brother Vatapi got annoyed with the Brahmins and started taking revenge against them by adopting magical tricks. Illwala's brother Vatapi would transform himself into a buffalo and after slaying the buffalo the cooked meat would be served to the Brahmins. Once the meal was consumed by the Brahmins then Ilvala would call out for his brother to come out of the stomach of the Brahmins. Vatapi would then assume his normal human form and emerge from the stomach of the Brahmins killing them in the process. This aspect was made known to Agastya. At that time Agastya who had attained benefit of his long penance through asceticism went to the heaven where on his way he saw a few manes suspended with their legs up over a gorge. Surprised, Agastya asked them the reason for their such a plight. They told him that they were waiting for a son to be born to their descendant to get release from this curse. They also told him that they were his ancestors and it was now left to him (Agastya) to get married and soon beget a son, perform oblation rites to gods, and get them released from the curse so that they could go to heaven. Agastya promised the manes of his ancestors that he would fulfill their wish. In another version it is said that Agastya encountered his ancestors in a dream in the form of suspended manes with heels up over a deep ravine.

=== Creation of Lopamudra ===
Agastya then started creating a woman of rare beauty and intelligence. He did this creation from most graceful parts of various creatures possessing such a beauty (drawn from "different birds, animal and flower, the eyes of the doe, the grace of the panther, the slenderness of the palm trees, the fragrance of the champak flower, the softness of the feather on a swan's neck"), who would eventually beget a son for him. At that time the king of Vidarbha, who was childless, was doing penance to gods seeking boon of a progeny. Agastya bestowed his creation of the women of his imagination to the king. As the girl child emerged into the world, in glowing beauty, the king called the Brahmins to bless the child. The Brahmins named her Lopamudra. As the creation was done due to the loss of parts of creatures (animals and plants) the girl was named Lopamudra, 'lopa' meaning "loss" and 'mudra' meaning "parts.". She grew up to be a very pretty, learned and devoted daughter and the King wanted to get her married when she attained puberty.

=== Lopamudra marries Agastya ===
The King approached Agastya seeking his advice for the marriage of his daughter. However, Agastya who was responsible for her beautiful creation for begetting a son for him, asked the king for her hand in marriage. This caused anguish to the king and queen as to how their daughter who was brought up in princely comforts could be married to an ascetic, a forest dweller. They were also scared of the power of Agastya who they felt could curse them if they refused to give Lopamudra in marriage to him. Looking at the worried status of her parents, Lopamudra volunteered to marry Agastya and requested her father to perform the wedding. Once married and taken to the forest to live with him, Agastya told Lopamudra to discard all her royal attire and ornaments and wear clothes fit for an ascetic's wife. She obeyed her husband and wore rags, deer skins and bark for her clothes. She dutifully, respectfully, lovingly and willingly served Agastya in his religious practices and penance. Her asceticism through tapas matched Agstya's. Agastya was then not attracted to her beauty and did not cohabit with her and remained detached though she was beautiful and was his own creation. However, after a long lapse of time, Agastya then wanted to beget a son who would full fill his promise to his ancestors and relieve them of their curse. However, Lopamudra was not willing as she put a condition that she would procreate with him only if she got all the riches and the princely comforts that she enjoyed at her father's place. Agastya countered pleadingly that as he was an ascetic he could not break the laws of asceticism otherwise all his spiritual achievements of so many years of penance which were meant for the benefit of human beings would be lost. But Lopamudra persistently argued that with great acetic qualities Agastya could achieve anything in this world. As her child bearing biological cycle would not last long she urged him to agree to her conditions and go in search of riches.

The Giridhara Ramayana has a different story of Lopamudra. Agastya approached king of Kanyakubja who had many daughters seeking a girl in marriage. The king promised the sage a girl when they come of age and asked him to come back a few years later. By the time the sage returned, however, the king had married off all his daughters. He was so worried about getting cursed, that he dressed his son Lopamudra as a girl and presented him to Agastya. Miraculously, Lopamudra was transformed and became a woman after the wedding.

=== Agastya acquires wealth ===
Agastya then went out seeking wealth. He met three kings, Srutarvan, Vradhnaswa, and Trasadasyu, one after the other, who welcomed him with due respects offering oblations and requested him to state his wish. He then told them to give him a part of their wealth. They all told him that after meeting the expenditure related to their commitments to the well-being of their subjects, with due diligence of the status of their revenue, they would be happy to spare surplus, if any. Agastya, after considering this statement felt that they had no wealth to spare for him. On the advice of the three kings, he then approached Ilvala, the King of asuras or danavas who was considered a very wealthy king.

Ilvala welcomed Agastya and the other three kings who accompanied him, within the limits of his city, with due honours. Once in his palace Ilvala served Agastya and his entourage the magic potion of the meat of his brother Vatapi who had taken the form of a buffalo to be served as cooked meat so that the brothers could slay the Brahmins after they consumed the meat. The kings were scared to consume the meat but Agastya told them not to worry as he would consume all the meat served to them and will spare them from eating it. He then consumed the meat dishes served to him and straight away digested the meat and said "Vatapi Jeerno Bhava", meaning let 'Vatapi be digested'. Ilvala then, as per past practice, called out for his brother Vatapi to come out. But Agastya only belched and gas came out of his mouth as Vatapi had been digested. With this turn of events then Illvala was sad but bestowed all the wealth that Agastya desired. The asura king gave away his golden chariot and gold and silver coins which Agastya and his three kings carried away with them. With the riches acquired, Agastya approached his wife who was pleased with the outcome. Agastya, who demonstrated his power in both the "secular and the sacred realms", approached Lopamudra's bedroom. Agastya then asked Lopamudra whether she would beget him 1,000 sons or just one son who could defeat a thousand. Lopamudra then told Agastya that she would prefer to have only one learned son as against 1,000 evil ones. Then they cohabited, she conceived and after a lapse of 7 years she delivered a baby boy. The son was named Idhmavaha (meaning "carrier of sacrificial wood") as he would serve his father in his sacrificial rites with wood. He was also called Drdhasyu. He was highly knowledgeable in Vedas and Upanishads. Agastya was pleased with his son. Following this, Agastya performed rites for his ancestors who were then relieved of their curse, and attained heaven.

Laurie L. Patton, an indologist, has observed that "in the case of Lopamudra, both the retention of seed in asceticism and the making of progeny are goals of the rishi Agastya, ... she is portrayed more and more derivatively, almost anemically, as she helps her husband/creator to promote the abstract ideal of dharma."

In another version of the story narrated by Vasudha Narayanan of the University of Florida, Lopamudra who is fully cognizant of Agastya's imperative necessity for a progeny to redeem the curse of his ancestors and the demon king Illvala's "intentions and machinations", she manipulates the sage which ensures his success.

== Other aspects ==
In the Hindu tantra tradition, Sri Vidya mantra devoted to the Devi which has twelve variations, each credited to a devote which included Lopamudra; the other devotees are Manu, Chandra, Kubera, Manmatha, Agastya, Surya, Indra, Skanda, Shiva and Krodhabattaraka (Durvasa). A version popular in South India during about the 6th century AD is called the Lopamudra mantra though now not practiced but it is also associated with traditions in Kashmir.

The river Kaveri in Karnataka is called Lopamudra. The legend behind this is that Agastya had kept Lopamudra, whom he had married for her beauty, confined in his Kamandala or water pot. During one of his sojourns away from his hermitage he stayed away for a long time and lived with another woman with whom he had fallen in love. Noting this, Lopamudra started weeping. Then Ganesha who was passing by heard her cries and released her by overturning the vessel in which she was confined. She flowed out as the river Kaveri.

Another version of Lopamudra being born as Kaveri is that she marries Sage Agastya on the condition that he would not leave her for too long or she would forsake him. One time, the sage was having a lengthy discussion with his disciples and he was prolonged in his absence from his wife. The Goddess angrily admonished her husband and turned away in such fury, that the pleats of her sari rearranged themselves to fall upon her right shoulder instead of her left (hence, why Kodava women have a unique way of wearing sari). As the sage pursued his wife, she jumped into a divine tank at the top of the Brahmagiri hill, being reborn as the Kaveri and disappeared underground before reappearing at Bhagamandala and flowing east towards the ocean. Goddess Kaveri is said to be dear to Shiva, Vishnu, Lakshmi/Bhagavathy and Parvati/Kali. The divine shrines of Ranganatha(Vishnu) and Nimishambika(Parvati/Kali) at Srirangapatna on the banks of the Kaveri are held sacred to the people of Karnataka and Srirangam is considered a Divya Desam of Vishnu and Lakshmi in Tamil Nadu.

== Bibliography ==
- Brooks, Douglas Renfrew (1 October 1992). Auspicious Wisdom: The Texts and Traditions of Srividya Sakta Tantrism in South India. SUNY Press. ISBN 978-0-7914-1146-9.
- D'Souza, Frank. A Victor of Circumstance. Notion Press. ISBN 978-93-83808-97-7.
- Garg, Gaṅgā Rām (1992). Encyclopaedia of the Hindu World. Concept Publishing Company. ISBN 978-81-7022-374-0.
- Hurteau, Pierre (7 November 2013). Male Homosexualities and World Religions. Palgrave Macmillan. ISBN 978-1-137-34053-5.
- Jain, Lakshmi (1 January 2008). Dropout of Girl-child in Schools. Northern Book Centre. ISBN 978-81-7211-244-8.
- Jamison, Stephanie W; Brereton, Joel P. (23 April 2014). The Rigveda: 3-Volume Set. Oxford University Press. ISBN 978-0-19-972078-1.
- Josh, Dinkar i (1 January 2005). Glimpses of Indian Culture. Star Publications. ISBN 978-81-7650-190-3.
- Kapoor, Subodh (2002). Ancient Hindu society. Cosmo Publications. ISBN 978-81-7755-378-9.
- Leslie, Julia (4 February 2014). Myth and Mythmaking: Continuous Evolution in Indian Tradition. Routledge. ISBN 978-1-136-77881-0.
- Moorthy, Choudur Satyanarayana (4 November 2011). Gleanings from Rig Veda – When Science was Religion. AuthorHouse. ISBN 978-1-4670-2401-3.
- Mukhopadhyaya, Dr. Rameshchandra (13 July 2014). The Rig Veda Reconsidered: The First Four Books of The Rig Veda In the Light of Modern Aesthetics. Anjali Publishers. ISBN 978-93-81745-14-4.
- Prasoon, Prof. Shrikant (3 September 2009). Rishis & Rishikas. Pustak Mahal. ISBN 978-81-223-1072-6.
- Rao, N.P. Shankara Narayan (1 January 2014). Agasthya. Litent. pp. 8–. GGKEY:UCAZ3FYWC5E.
- Swami, Vasantānanta; Irāmaccantiraṉ, Nā (1993). Sri Lalita Sahasranamam: Nama-wise Commentary in English with Text in Sanskrit. Copies available at Higgin Bothams.
- Warrier, Shrikala (December 2014). Kamandalu: The Seven Sacred Rivers of Hinduism. MAYUR University. ISBN 978-0-9535679-7-3.
