= Chola Nadu =

Region of Tamil Nadu

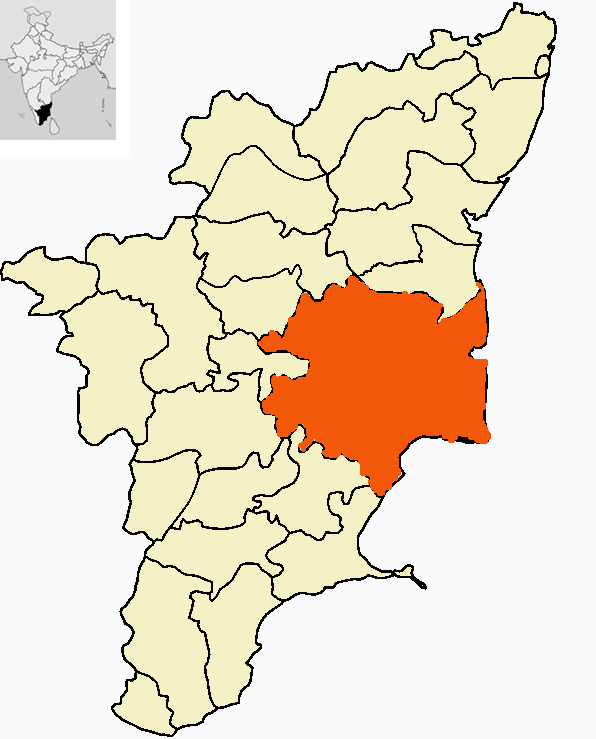
Approximative extent of the Chola heartland, designated as the Chola Mandalam or Chola Nadu.

Chola Nadu also known as Chola Mandalam, is an ancient region spanning on the current state of Tamil Nadu and union territory of Puducherry in southern India. It encompasses the lower reaches of the Kaveri River and its delta, and formed the cultural homeland and political base of the Chola Dynasty which ruled large parts of India and Sri Lanka between the 9th and 13th centuries CE. Uraiyur (now part of Tiruchirapalli city) served as the early Chola capital, then medieval Cholas shifted to Thanjavur and later cholas king Rajendra Chola I moved the capital to Gangaikonda Cholapuram in Ariyalur district in the 11th century CE. Chola Nadu is therefore larger than the Tanjore region or the Cauvery delta in the strict sense. Although it essentially corresponds to these two overlapping areas.

The boundaries of the region roughly correlates with those of the British India districts of Tanjore and Trichinopoly, and the établissement of Karaikal in French India. Historically, the region also encompassed at time present Ariyalur and Perambalur districts (parts of erstwhile South Arcot), parts of Pudukkottai district (erstwhile Pudukkottai State) and southern reaches of Cuddalore district (taluks of Chidambaram and Kattumannarkoil).

== Location ==
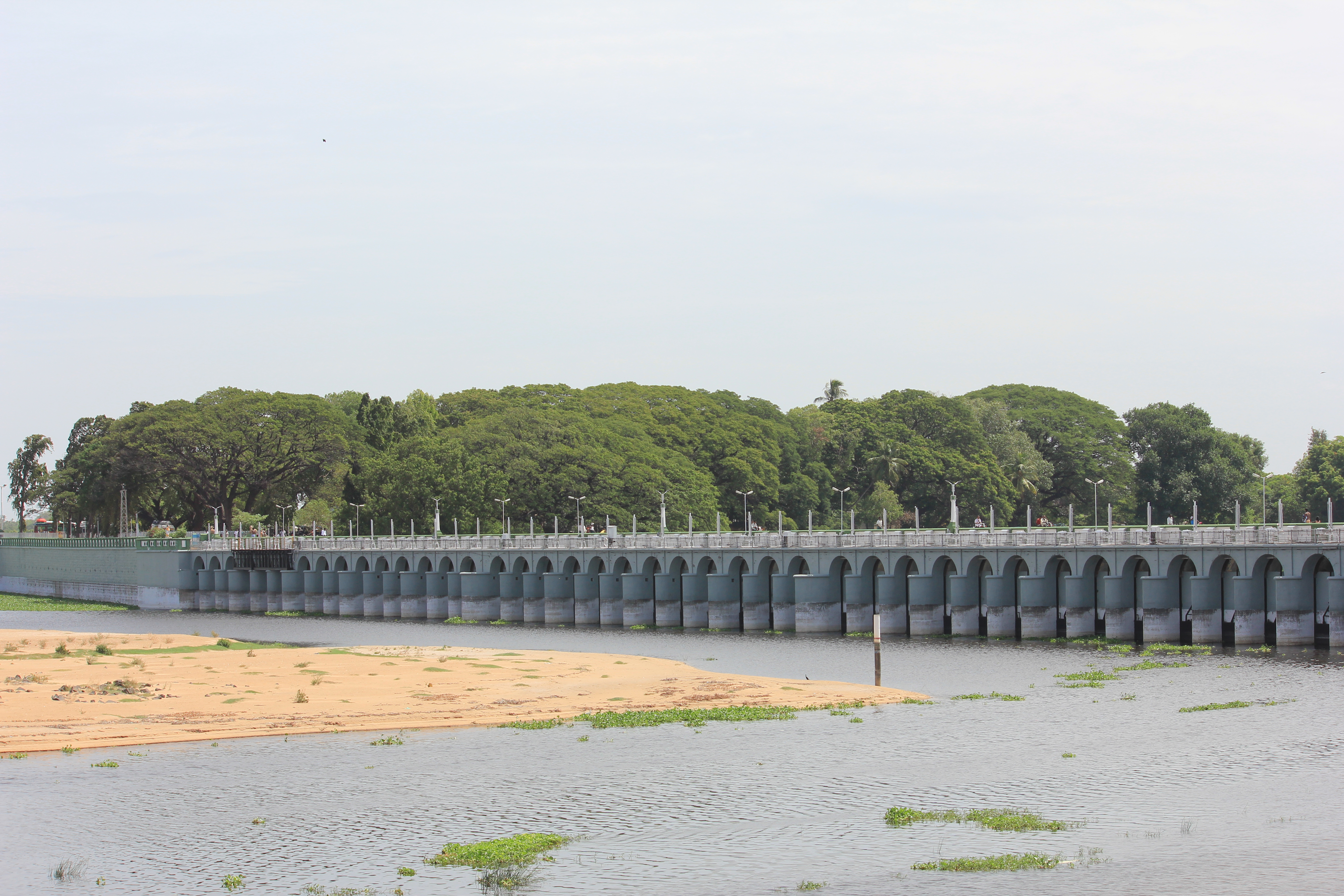
Kallanai / Grand Anicut built by Karikala Cholan, on the River Kaveri, near Tiruchirappalli

The Chola Nadu region covers Central Tamil Nadu and East-Central Tamil Nadu. The region is sandwiched between the historical regions of Tondai Nadu in the north, the Madurai region or Pandya Nadu in the south and Kongu Nadu in the west and roughly extends from Chidambaram in north to the southern frontier of the erstwhile Pudukkottai kingdom and from Tiruchirapalli in the west to the Bay of Bengal in the east.

According to the Gazetteer of the Trichinopoly District, Vol II, 1931, p 67, "the traditional meeting place of the three Tamil kingdoms was the temple of Cellānti Amman on the banks of the Kāvēri, twelve miles west of Kulittalai and three miles below the junction of the Amarāvati and the Kāvēri. The temple was the common place of worship for the kings of the three Tamil dynasties; a bund which runs to the south of the river marks the boundary between the Cōla and the Pāntya territories, and the Karaipōttanār on the opposite bank of the river was the boundary between the Cōla and the Cēra kingdoms".

The limits of the Chola heartland are also broadly defined with the courses of the two Vellar rivers. The northern Vellar passes above Chidambaram, while the southern Vellar flows below Pudukkottai.

== Chola Kings ==
List of Chola kings
Early Cholas
- Ellalan
- Kulakkottan
- Ilamchetchenni
- Karikala
- Nedunkilli
- Nalankilli
- Killivalavan
- Kopperuncholan
- Kochchenganan
- Perunarkilli
Interregnum (c. 200 – c. 848)
Medieval Cholas

Vijayalaya Chola	848–891(?)
Aditya Chola I	891–907
Parantaka Chola I	907–950
Gandaraditya Chola	950–957
Arinjaya Chola	956–957
Sundara Chola	957–970
Aditya Chola II	(co-regent)
Uttama Chola	970–985
Rajaraja Chola I	985–1014
Rajendra Chola I	1012–1044
Rajadhiraja Chola	1044–1054
Rajendra Chola II	1054–1063
Virarajendra Chola	1063–1067
Athirajendra Chola	1067–1070

Later Cholas

Kulothunga Chola I	1070–1120
Vikrama Chola	1118–1135
Kulothunga Chola II	1133–1150
Rajaraja Chola II	1146–1173
Rajadhiraja Chola II	1166–1178
Kulothunga Chola III	1178–1218
Rajaraja Chola III	1216–1256
Rajendra Chola III	1246–1279

Related dynasties

Telugu Cholas of Andhra
Chodagangas of Kalinga
Rajahnate of Cebu

Chola society
- Chola government
- Chola military
- Chola Navy
- Chola art
- Chola literature
- Flag of Chola
- Great Living Chola Temples
- Solesvara Temples
- Poompuhar
- Uraiyur
- Melakadambur
- Pazhayarai
- Thanjavur
- Tiruvarur
- Gangaikonda Cholapuram

== Chola Empire ==
The genealogy of the Chola empire as found in the Tamil literature and in the many inscriptions left by the later Chola kings contains a number of kings recorded for whom there is no verifiable historic evidence. There are as many versions of this lineage as there are sources for them. The main source is the Sangam literature – particularly, religious literature such as Periapuranam, semi-biographical poems of the later Chola period such as the temple and cave inscription and left by medieval Cholas.

Irrespective of the source, no list of the kings has a high level of historic fact and, while they generally are similar to each other, no two lists are exactly the same. Modern historians consider these lists not as historically reliable sources but as comprehensive conglomerations of various Hindu deities and Puranic characters attributed to local chieftains and invented ancestry of dynasty attempting to re-establish their legitimacy and supremacy in a land they were trying to conquer.

== History ==
The history of the region begins with the rise of the Early Chola kingdom in the 4th century BC. The Early Cholas ruled from the town of Uraiyur near Tiruchirapalli and their kingdom comprised the whole of the present-day Cauvery Delta. Flourishing centres of Roman trade have been excavated at Poompuhar (Nagapattinam) stand testimony to a prosperous civilization.

== Culture ==
The Chola Nadu region is renowned as a hub of Tamil culture and civilization. The region has been continuously inhabited since the 1st millennium BC. Arts, crafts and music flourished under the Cholas whose reign is considered to be one of the golden ages in the history of Tamil Nadu. During the hegemony of the Vijayanagar Empire and its successors, the Thanjavur Nayak and the Thanjavur Maratha kingdoms, there were frequent migrations of priests, administrators, soldiers and artists from the far northern sides of the Deccan or beyond, especially from Telugu, Kannada and Marathi speaking areas, who brought in their traditions, art and dance forms. The Chola Nadu region thus experienced a period of intense artistic and cultural development on a multicultural background, also sustained by its exchanges with foreign countries. As a result, the region's influence spread over a wide part of India. Despite its rise and initial success in the northern part of Karnataka, Carnatic music actually flourished in the Cauvery Delta. Kambar (poet) was a renowned medieval Tamil poet and the author of the Ramavataram, popularly known as Kambaramayanam, the Tamil version of Ramayana. Kambar also authored other literary works in Tamil, such as Thirukkai Vazakkam, Erezhupathu, Silaiezhupathu, Kangai Puranam, Sadagopar Anthathi, and Sarasvati Anthati hails from the Cauvery Delta region. The three great Carnatic music composers, Tyagaraja, Syama Sastri and Muthuswami Dikshitar who form the Great Trinity of Carnatic music (or Tiruvarur Trinity) hailed from the Chola Nadu region as also the music composers Muthu Thandavar, Arunachala Kavi and Marimutthu Pillai who form the Tamil Trinity of Carnatic music (or Shiyali Trinity).

Apart from music, dance and drama have also flourished in the Cauvery Delta. The Bhagavathar Melas, a series of dance-dramas, written almost entirely in Telugu, were introduced by migrants who sought refuge in the town of Melattur following the collapse of the Vijayanagar kingdom at the Battle of Talikota.

Bharatanatyam, a popular dance form by Bharatha muni, flourished in the dance of sadir which was practised in the temples of Chola Nadu by ritual temple dances or devadasis. Patronized and financed by dharmakarthas and rich mirasidars, sadir was popular until the early years of the 20th century when a strong voiced campaign resulted in the devadasi practised being outlawed. Sadir has, since, purged itself of its erotic symbolism and movements and gradually evolved into the commoners' dance Bharathanatyam.

== Demographics ==
The Chola Nadu region had a population of over 10 million with a density of above 400 persons per km^{2} in 2001. Due to fertile soil and favourable climate, the region has been the most densely populated in the Tamil country since ancient times.

More than 90% of the population speak Tamil. There is a significant Telugu speaking minority, who had descended from migrants who had mostly moved in during the Vijayanagar and Thanjavur Nayak periods. There are smaller populations speaking Saurashtra, Kannada. There are also a considerable body of Marathi speaking people who are mostly present in the urban areas of Thanjavur and Tiruchirappalli districts, as well as in both of these cities.

== Important Personalities ==
The Chola Nadu region has produced a number of noteworthy personalities in the fields of arts, science, film and politics. Long recognized as a hub of Carnatic music, the region is home to most of India's renowned Carnatic musicians. There have also been important individuals in the field of politics. In British times, civil servants and lawyers from Chola Nadu like Sir T. Madhava Rao, Sir A. Seshayya Sastri, Sir Mohammad Usman, Sir A. T. Panneerselvam, Sir T. Muthuswamy Iyer, Sir P. S. Sivaswami Iyer, T. Ananda Rao, S. Satyamurti, V. S. Srinivasa Sastri, V. P. Madhava Rao and R. Raghunatha Rao dominated the bureaucracy. The maternal ancestors of Sir C. P. Ramaswami Iyer hailed from Kumbakonam. Tamil writers U. V. Swaminatha Iyer, Samuel Vedanayagam Pillai, V. V. S. Aiyar and Kalki Krishnamurthy, Kalki Sadasivam journalists Kalki Sadasivam, G. A. Natesan and Kasturi Ranga Iyengar, Indian independence activist G. Subramania Iyer who founder The Hindu, politicians M. R. Sethuratnam Iyer and S. Muthiah Mudaliar and Indian media mogul S. S. Vasan were some prominent individuals from the Chola Nadu region. Yesteryear film actors Manorama, M. K. Thyagaraja Bhagavathar, Gemini Ganesan, P. U. Chinnappa and T. R. Rajakumari, Papanasam Sivan Indian scientist and Nobel Prize winner Sir C. V. Raman and mathematician Srinivasa Ramanujan, Muthulakshmi Reddi, Sujatha, Jayendra Saraswathi, Sri Sri Ravi Shankar, U. Sagayam, Gopinath Chandran, Madhan, N. Gopalaswami, M. S. Swaminathan, Viswanathan Anand, Venkatraman Ramakrishnan were other important people from the region.

Recent time politicians include the former Chief Ministers of Tamil Nadu M. Karunanidhi and Jayalalithaa whose ancestors are from Tiruchirapalli and Thanjavur, Former Finance Minister of Tamil Nadu K. Anbazhagan, Former President of India R. Venkataraman, Kaduvetti Guru, PMK, Former Cabinet Minister and Leader of the House R.M.Veerappan and late Veteran Congress leader G.K. Moopanar, Ko. Si. Mani Former minister for local administration of Tamil Nadu, Former Union Minister Andimuthu Raja, VCK Leader Thol. Thirumavalavan, V. K. Sasikala Indian businesswoman turned politician, T. T. V. Dhinakaran, La Ganesan, H. Raja, Karunas, S. Ve. Shekher and Union Ministers G.K. Vasan, Mani Shankar Aiyar, Murasoli Maran, T. R. Baalu, S. S. Palanimanickam, Su. Thirunavukkarasar. Film personalities such as directors K. Balachander, S. Shankar and actors T. Rajendar, Ramesh Aravind, Arvind Swamy, Hema Malini, M. S. Bhaskar, Rajesh and Dhivyadharshini are from the Cauvery Delta region.

== See also ==
- Coromandel Coast
