= Nedunkilli =

Tamil king

- Nedunkilli Chola
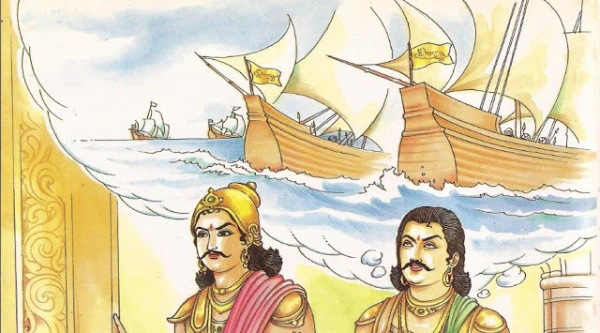
- Reign: c. 425 BCE
- Predecessor: Karikala Chola
- Successor: Nalankilli
- Born: c. 450 BCE
- Died: c. 405 BCE; Kariyaru, Chola Kingdom, Tamilakam
- Father: Karikala Chola

Nedunkilli (Tamil: நெடுங்கிள்ளி; [neɖuŋɡiɭːi]; Middle Tamil: Neṭuṅkiḷḷi Cōḻaṉ (நெடுங்கிள்ளி சோழன்); c. 450 BCE – c. 405 BCE) was a Tamil king of the Early Cholas from the region of Tamilakam mentioned in Sangam Literature. Nedunkilli was mentioned in context with a civil war between him and another Chola Nalankilli. The only extant information on him is from the fragmentary poems of Sangam.

== Sources ==
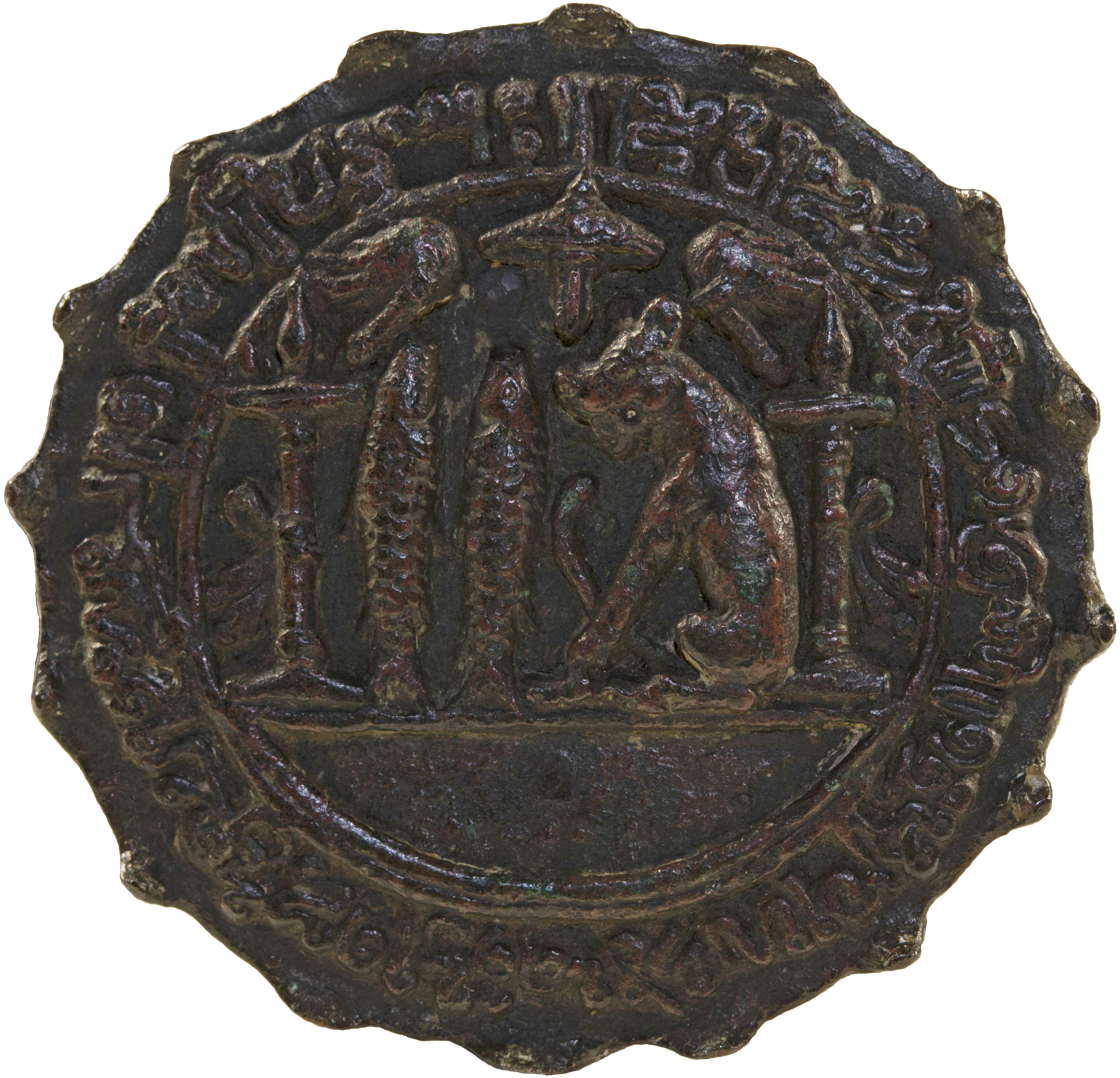
Charter issued by the Chola Dynasty.

The only sources available on Nedunkilli are the mentions in Sangam poetry. The period covered by the extant literature of the Sangam is not easy to determine with any measure of certainty. Except the longer epics Cilappatikaram and Manimekalai, which by common consent belong to the age later than the Sangam age, the poems have survived in the forms of systematic anthologies. Each individual poem has generally attached to it a colophon on the authorship and subject matter of the poem, the name of the king or chieftain to whom the poem relates and the occasion which called forth the eulogy are also found.

It is from these colophons and rarely from the texts of the poems themselves, that the names of many kings and chieftains and the poets patronised by them are gathered. The task of reducing these names to an ordered scheme in which the different generations of contemporaries can be marked off one another has not been easy. To add to the confusion, some historians have even denounced these colophons as later additions and untrustworthy as historical documents.

Any attempt at extracting a systematic chronology and data from these poems should acknowledge the casual nature of these poems and the wide difference between the purposes of the anthologist who collected these poems and the historian's attempts at arriving at a continuous history.

== Relationship between Nalankilli and Nedunkilli ==
Manimekalai embellishes the story of the mortal battle Nedunkilli fought with Nalankilli at Kariyaru. According to Manimekalai, the battle was fought by a junior Chola prince in the reign of Mavankilli, also called Nudumudikilli and Killivalavan. We can infer for this that Nalankilli was the junior prince and was the younger brother of Nedumudikilli. Some of the Purananuru Poems (poem 27) call Nalankilli ‘Setcenni Nalankilli. This suggests the relationship (possibly grandfather-grandson) between Ilamcetcenni, the father of Karikala Chola, and Nalankilli. Nalankilli also had a younger brother Mavalattan (Purananuru – 43). From the above K.A.N. Sastri deduces that Nalankilli, Nedunkilli and Mavalattan were the three sons of Karikala Chola.

There is however nothing other than the name Kariyaru to connect the battle mentioned in Puranauru and Manimekalai. Manimekalai vividly describes this battle as a great event in Chola history rather than a petty quarrel between two brothers as seen from Purananuru. This is also no mention of the involvement of Chera and Pandya kings in the Purananuru poems.

Nedungilli, the rival of Nalangilli in the Chola civil war, is the subject of two poems by the poet Kovur Kilar. In these verses, Kovur Kilar appeals to both princes to end their conflict, providing valuable insights into the events of the war. One poem recounts that Nedungilli was once besieged and confined within the fortress of Avur, which, like Uraiyur, had come under attack by Nalangilli’s forces.

== War between Nedunkilli and Nalankilli ==
Purananuru speaks of the war between two Cholas Nalankilli and Nedunkilli, which lasted until the death of Nedunkilli at the battlefields of Kariyaru. These two Cholas must have belonged to the rival branches of the Chola families, which ruled from Poompuhar and Urayur as their capitals.

Nedunkilli was the opponent of Nalankilli and ruled from Urayur. The poet Kovur Kilar addresses Nedunkilli in two poems (Purananuru – 44, 45) and gives some details regarding the civil conflict. According to these poems, Nedunkilli was once shut up at a fort in Avur and was besieged by Nalankilli. The poet graphically describes the strife the ordinary people went through because of the siege, and demands that Nedunkilli come out and fight like a man.

The male elephants, not led out to bathe with the female herd in the large tanks (outside the fort), nor fed with balls of rice mixed with ghee, chafe at the posts to which they are chained, heave long sighs, and with their trunks rolling on the ground, trumpet loudly like thunder. Children cry for want of milk, the women plait their hair without flowers, the mansions of the city resound with the cries of people wailing for want of water. It is not possible to hold out any more here, you master of fleet steeds! If you would be kind, open the gates (to the enemy) saying “This is yours”; if you would be heroic, open the gates and lead your soldiers out to victory; to be neither the one nor the other, to close the strong gates of the fort and to shut yourself up in a corner behind the high walls, this, when one thinks of it, is shameful indeed! (Purananuru – 44).

Nedunkilli had ambition without courage and brought much suffering on himself and his subjects by his cowardice. Like all cowards, he seems to have lived a life of constant dread of treachery and foul play.

When Nalankilli besieged Urayur with Nedunkilli locked up inside the fort, a poet named Ilantattan went into the fort. Nedunkilli took him prisoner, suspecting his to be a spy and was about to have him killed. The poet Kovur Kilar, successfully pleaded for Ilantattan's life (Purannuru – 47).

=== Battle of Kariyaru ===
Manimekalai mentions of a great battle of Kariyaru in which the 'Chola junior prince' (Ilankon) defeated the Pandya and Chera kings. We can infer that the Chola prince Ilankon to be Nalankilli ilankon and that this was the battle in which Nedunkilli met his fate and the civil strife came to an end.

Kovur Kilar again pleaded with both the Chola princes to give up their strife, as whoever wins, the loser will be a Chola (Purananuru – 45).

The plea apparently had no effect and Nedunkilli was killed in battle at Kariyaru.

== See also ==
- Sangam Literature
- Early Cholas
- Legendary early Chola kings
