= Poruṇarāṟṟuppaṭai =

Ancient Tamil poem

Porunarāṟṟuppaṭai (Tamil: பொருநராற்றுப்படை, lit. "guide for war bards") is an ancient Tamil poem and the second lay of the Pattuppattu anthology in the Sangam literature. It contains 248 lines, mostly in the akaval meter. It is one of five arruppatai genre poems, possibly the oldest one, aimed as a guide to other bards seeking a patron for their art. Set in the early Chola kingdom, describes about Uraiyur, the capital of Cholas and the Powerful King of early cholas Karikala Cholan, his early life and how he brought up the King of Chola Kingdom. It was composed by Mutattamakkanniyar sometime around 180–190 CE, states Kamil Zvelebil – a Tamil literature scholar.

The Porunararruppatai poem, also transliterated as Porunarattrupadai, is set in the context of a meeting of the poet with a "war bard" (porunar) and his wife, wherein the poet guides his hosts on how to go about meeting the Chola king, the background information about the king and his kingdom.

The poem is notable for its two strings of similes. In the first string, the poet compares each part of the lute to different parts of the female body. For example, the surface of the lute is described as "fair belly of the pregnant woman" and the overall appearance of the musical instrument is described as "bedecked bride". In the second string of similes, a danseuse body is compared to images of nature. The poet compares, for example, her small feet to "tongue of a panting hound", her mound-of-venus to "seat of bees", her navel to "water ripple", her earlobes to "well-shaped loops of scissors". The poem also includes hyperbolic and humorous statements.

The poem is a source of historical information about the ancient Chola kingdom and king Karikala. It describes the River Kaveri along with the towns settled along its banks. The poem dedicates many lines each to four regions of the Chola kingdom, along with flora, fauna and different fruits. The Porunararruppatai is another source of the ancient Tamil culture, lifestyle, and people. For example, it mentions the town of Cholanadu and states that the inhabitants there eat meat and drink liquor, states Zvelebil. According to Chelliah, this poem suggests that the 2nd-century Tamil society ate meat, and the shift to vegetarian lifestyle happened in later centuries. The god of war Murugan, a goddess possibly Kali Kankalan, along with the ceremonial ancestral offering of red rice to crows (shraddha) are mentioned in the poem. A few lines of Porunarattrupadai allude to the rebirth and karma (ool) theories, suggestive of Brahmanical ideas.

== See also ==
- Eighteen Greater Texts
- Sangam literature
