= Karikala =

Historical Chola king who ruled over southern India

- Peruvaḷatthaān; Thirumāvaḷavan; Parakesari (Sanskrit)
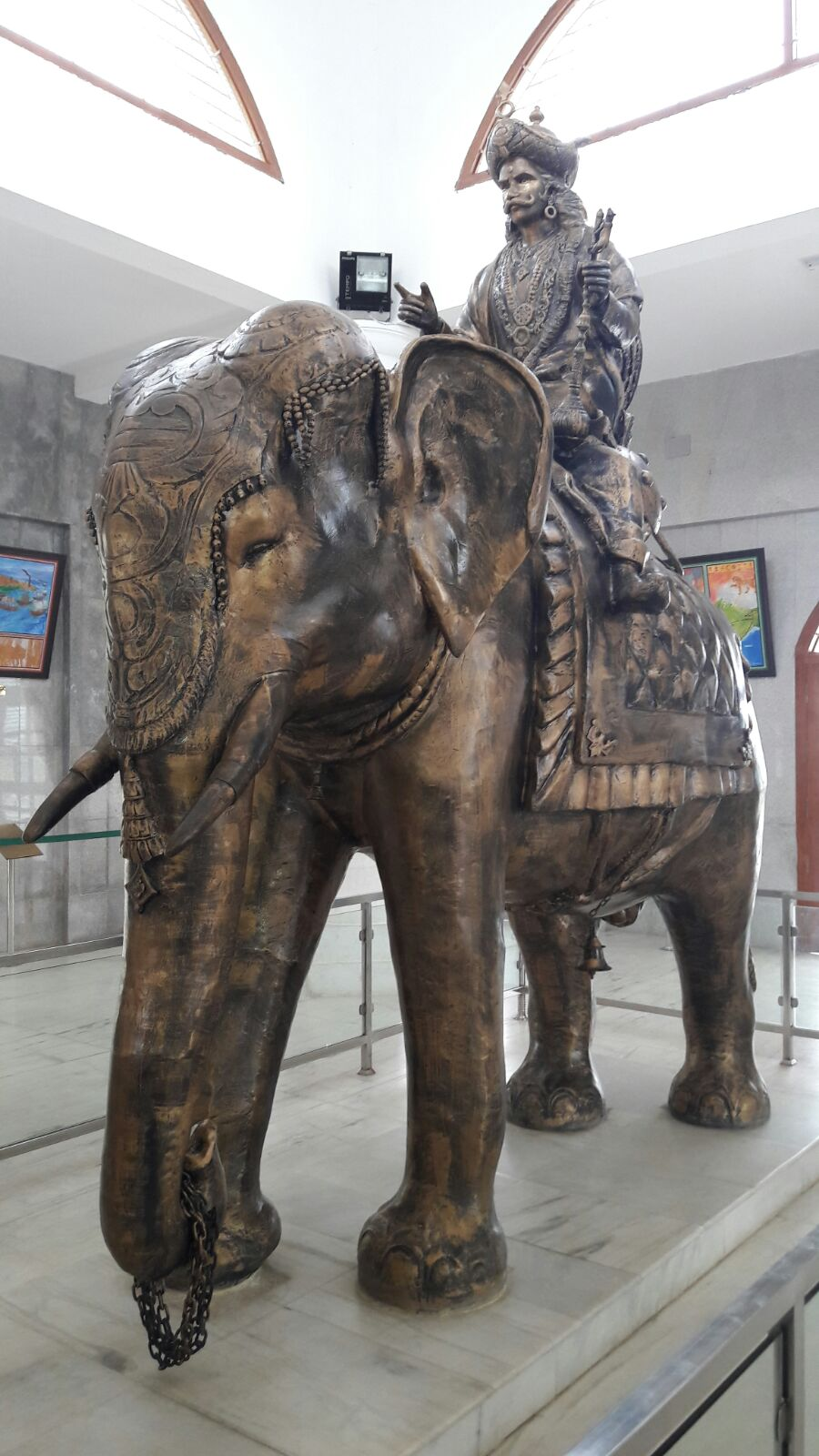
- Bronze statue of Karikāla Chōḻaṉ
- Predecessor: Ilamcetcenni
- Successor: Nedunkilli and Nalankilli
- Queen: Velir princess from Nangur
- Issue: Nalankilli; Nedunkilli; Māvalattān
- Father: Ilamcetcenni

Karikala (Tamil: கரிகால; [kaːrikɑːl]; Middle Tamil: Karikāḷa Cōḻaṉ (கரிகால சோழன்), often referred to as Karikala the Great and the Death to sin, (Note: as per the Thiruvilandur Copper Plate of Rajadhiraja Chola I and Rajendra Chola II) was a Tamil Emperor of the Early Cholas of the Chola dynasty who ruled ancient Tamilakam (Modern day South India) from Uraiyur and then Puhar. He is credited with the construction of the flood banks of the river Kaveri and conquest of Tamilakam, Andhra and Sri Lanka. He is recognised as the greatest of the Early Cholas. The Thiruvalangadu plates of Rajendra Chola I, and the Thiruvilandur plates associated with Rajadhiraja I and his younger brother Rajendra II, include Karikala Chola in their genealogical accounts of the Chola dynasty. Several Telugu dynasties also claimed descendant from Karikala.

== Sources ==
The story of Karikala is mixed with legend and anecdotal information gleaned from Sangam literature. The period covered by the extant literature of the Sangam is not easy to determine with any measure of certainty.

Paṭṭiṉappālai, Poruṇarāṟṟuppaṭai and a number of individual poems in the Akanaṉūṟu and Purananuru have been the main source for the information that is attributed to Karikala.

There are many inscriptions and records found both in Tamil Nadu and Andhra Pradesh which mention Karikala and his conquests and the construction of flood banks along the Kaveri river. Many rulers and petty chiefs who came after him claimed him as their ancestor and decorated themselves as belonging to the Chola clan of Karikala and of the Kashyapa gotra. The following lines are taken from the Malepadu plates of Renadu Chola king Punyakumara,

"Dinakara-kula-mandar-achala-mandara-padapassya

Kavera-tanaya-velollamghanaprasamana-pramukn-adyanak-atisaya-karinah

Trairajya-sthitim-atmasat-kritavatah-karikala"

The above lines are translated as: "In the clan of Karikala, who was the Mandara tree on the Mandara mountain, viz., the solar clan; who was the worker of many wonders like controlling the daughter of Kaveri"

== Early life ==
Karikala was the son of Ilamcetcenni. The name Karikalan has been held to mean "the man with the charred leg" and perpetuates the memory of a fire accident in the early years of his life. Some scholars also hold the view kari and kalan are Tamil words meaning "slayer of elephants". Poruṇarāṟṟuppaṭai describes the back-formed origin legend of this incident as follows:

The king of Uraiyur (Tiruchirappalli) Ilamcetcenni married a Velir princess from Azhundur and she became pregnant and gave birth to Karikala. Ilamcetcenni died soon after. Due to his young age, Karikala's right to the throne was overlooked and there was political turmoil in the country. Karikala was exiled. When normality returned, the Chola ministers sent a state elephant to look for the prince. The elephant finds the prince hiding in Karuvur (modern day Karur in Tamil Nadu). His political opponents arrested and imprisoned him. The prison was set on fire that night. Karikala escaped the fire and, with the help of his uncle Irum-pitar-thalaiyan, defeated his enemies. Karikala's leg was scorched in the fire and from thence Karikala became his name.

Old Sangam Age inscriptions and also sthala puranam of great ancient Saiva shrine at Parasalur, near Mayiladuthurai (erstwhile Mayavaram), says that, in order to escape the murder plot hatched by conspirators Karikal Valavan stayed there in disguise of a vedic and agama sastra lecturer for eight years.

Paṭṭiṉappālai, written in praise of Karikala also describes this incident, but without mention of the fable of the burnt limb:

Once, in a dense forest, a young tiger cub was captured by hunters and locked in a wooden cage. Inside, it grew quietly, its claws sharpening as its body filled with strength and purpose. Though confined, it watched the world outside and learned its captors' routines.

One day, a mighty elephant nearby struggled within a deep pit. Using its massive trunk, the elephant pushed against the edges of the trap, bringing the banks down and freeing itself. The tiger watched closely, inspired by the creature's determination and method.

Determined to break free as well, the tiger bided its time. It studied the weakness in the cage's structure and waited for the guards to grow complacent. Then, with a swift slash of its powerful claws, it tore through the wooden bars, catching the guards off guard. Overpowering them with its newfound strength and skill, it leapt into the jungle and reclaimed its freedom, thriving in its rightful domain.

== Military conquests ==
According to Silapathikaram, Indira vilavureduttakadai verses 89 to 110 Mentioned Karikala Chola Military Achievements:

"Once Tirumavalavan felt that there was no foe on either side fit to fight with him and thinking, in his thirst for war, that there might be foes in the north, he had an auspicious day chosen for taking out hig sword, umbrella and war-drum, and he prayed to his guardian deity that he might be lucky enough to find an enemy fit to encounter his broad shoulders, and advanced in that direction. Finding the great Himalayas, the residence of gods, as the barrier arresting his further progress, he retreated with pride after engraving his tiger-emblem on its rocky side. On his return, the king of the great Vacciranadu whose sway extended as far as the roaring sea (in the east), gave him a pearl canopy as tribute while th» king of Magadha famous for his sword-play, and his enemy a while ago, presented to him an audience-hall (pattimandapam) . The king of Avanti gave him a friendly present of a tall and beautiful arch on the gateway. Though all these were made of gold and gems, their technique was not known to human artists even of exceptional skill ; they were long ago given to the ancestors of these three monarchs by the divine Maya in return for some valuable service rendered to him. When they were all placed together, they formed an artistic mandapam much praised by great men."

— Silapathikaram,Indira vilavureduttakadai 89-110

According to Cilappatikaram, Nadukarkadai mentioned about Karikala Chola Successful North India Campaign and he received gifts from north Indian kingdoms by tributary it's follows:

"O king with the tumbai and the anklet, tokens of success in battle! Attended by these vanquished Arya kings we went to the ancient city of Sembiyan (Chola) and paid our respects to him through his officers. Seated in the ornamented mandapam constructed (with the materials received as gifts) from the Vaccira (Vatsa), Avanti and Magadha kings, he remarked to the commander of his chariot corps occupying the front rank of the army : ' it is no achievement to capture in the wide expanse of the battlefield those who, after displaying great military prowess, gave up their umbrellas and swords and fled in the disguise of non-combatants.”

— Cilappatikaram, Nadukarkadai 78 - 94

According to verse 178 of the Kalingattuparani, Karikala Chola is said to have inscribed the tiger emblem on the Himalayas:

"When the Chola king Karikālan went to the northern countries to fight,

the Himalaya mountain stopped him. He turned the hill upside down with a chendu weapon, planted his tiger banner on it and said to Himalaya, “May you become as before!”

and made the hill straight again."

— Kalingathuparani - 178

"You delight in looting the enemy's country by the light of the destructive fires which you have started. Because of your plunder, the enemy's land is deprived of all good things.”

— poet's praise of Karikāla Chola

=== Battle of Venni ===
According to the Poruṇarāṟṟuppaṭai, Karikala Chola fought a great Battle of Venni in which both Pandyan and Cheran king Uthiyan Cheralathan suffered a defeat. Although we know very little about the circumstances leading to this battle, there can be no doubt that it marked the turning point in Karikala's career, for in this battle he broke the back of the powerful confederacy formed against him. Besides the two crowned kings of the Pandya and Chera countries, eleven minor chieftains took the opposing side in the campaign and shared defeat at the hands of Karikala. The Chera king, who was wounded on his back in the battle, committed suicide by starvation. Venni was the watershed in the career of Karikala which established him firmly on his throne and secured for him some sort of hegemony among the three crowned monarchs. Venni is also known as Vennipparandalai and now it is known as Kovilvenni and is situated near Needamangalam, 25 km away from Thanjavur.

According to Thiruvilandur Copper Plate verse, issued during the reigns of Rajadhiraja Chola I and his younger brother Rajendra Chola II:

"Before departing for a war against the Pandyas, Karikala is said to have installed his learned queen as ruler; the account suggests that she may have been pregnant at the time".

— Sridhar, T. S. (2011), Thiruvindalur Copper Plate,

Karikala’s Naval Power and the Battle of Venni — described in Purananuru - 66 by Venni Kuyathiyar:

"O heir of a mighty man who mastered the movement of the wind and had his ships sail on the huge, full ocean! O Karikalan who owns rutting elephants! You who won displaying your strength in the battlefield near prosperous Venni town!

— Purananuru -66

=== Battle of Vahaipparandalai ===
According to Pattinapalai verse :

"Those from Oli land are humble and under

his control. Those from the ancient Aruva land submit to him. Northerners lose to him and Kudanadu ruler bows to his might. He captures enemy forts and ruins the strengths of the Pandiyan king. He ruins the weak forest kings and their heirs with enraged red eyes, as well as king Irungovel's clan, with his huge

army of brave warriors."

— Pattinapalai (274 - 285)

The Battle of Vahaipparandalai was a significant military engagement during the Sangam period in South India, fought by the Chola king Karikala. In this battle, Karikala Chola defeated confederacy of nine enemy chieftains, forcing them to submit. This victory, along with his earlier triumph at the Battle of Venni, solidified Karikala's dominance over the Tamil region and established him as a powerful ruler. Paranar, a contemporary of Karikala, in his poem from Agananuru mentions this incident without giving any information on the cause of the conflict. The Confederacy of Nine kings and their vassals were defeated by him, Numerous Oliyars Submitted to him, the Pallavas of Kanchi and the Kurumbas were Compelled to accept his sovereignty. The Battle of Vahaiparantalai make karikala master of vast domination including Thondaimandalam. Pattinapalai mentioned the city was strong walls with Goddess of victory and karikala furnished with door tiger cryst engraved. Pattinapalai also said Karikala chola has no enemies that he left his capital puhar with sword and proceeded his rule north up to Himalayas. Bramanical sacrifice was encouraged in his rule and karikala patrone literature. According to Seshadri sastri karikala reign was 113AD to 135 AD. Oliyar, Aruvalar, Vadavar, Kudavar, Tennavar, Poduvar, Irungovel were defeated in that battle of Vahaiparantalai. "The famous victor, the Sola, Karikal, protected the families of the Kurumbar who tend (flocks) on the hill-tops". The poem also states karikala destroyed forests and turned into habbitable places. According to Paranar, the nine princess with large army who proposed karikala probably Kurumbas and they were defeated by Karikala in that battle.

Karikala is said to have shifted the Chola capital from Uraiyur to Kaveripattinam (Puhar), which provided access to naval power and facilitated foreign trade. The poet of the Pattinappalai describes the city and its prosperity during Karikala's reign.

=== Further Wars and Conquest of Ceylon ===
According to legends Karikala was one of the few Chola kings who won the whole of Ceylon (Lanka). The Grand anicut was built after his conquest over the Sinhalese kingdom and he used Sinhalese war prisoners for the hard task of moving stones from the mountains to the river bed of the Kaveri. The Pattinappalai also describes the destruction caused by Karikala's armies in the territories of his enemies and adds that as the result of these conflicts, the "Northerners and Westerners were depressed… and his flushed look of anger caused the Pandya’s strength to give way…".

=== Conquest of Tondainadu and Andhra from Pallavas ===
Based on numerous village records and Telugu Chola inscriptions found in Andhra, Karikala seems to have battled against a Pallava king named Trilochana Pallava or Mukhanti Pallava or Mukhanti Kaduvetti and captured Tondainadu, leaving the southern Telugu country to the Pallava king. The Pallava king who had Kanchi as his capital moved the capital to Kalahasti after losing Kanchi in the battle. The inscriptions also says that Karikala ordered Trilochana Pallava to come and assist him in building the flood banks along the Kaveri river. But the Pallava king who was ruling from Kalahasti declined to obey which made Karikala to declare war against him. Karikala won the battle and captured the Telugu country. During that time period, southern Andhra was covered with big forests which is not fit for cultivation. So, Karikala destroyed the forests and planted many villages. One of the villages is Pottapi, which was the most important village and hence the whole locality acquired in course of time the name Pottapi Nadu. Unlike Trilochana Pallava, Karikala Chola donated lands not only to Brahmins but also to the cultivators.

== Grand Anicut ==
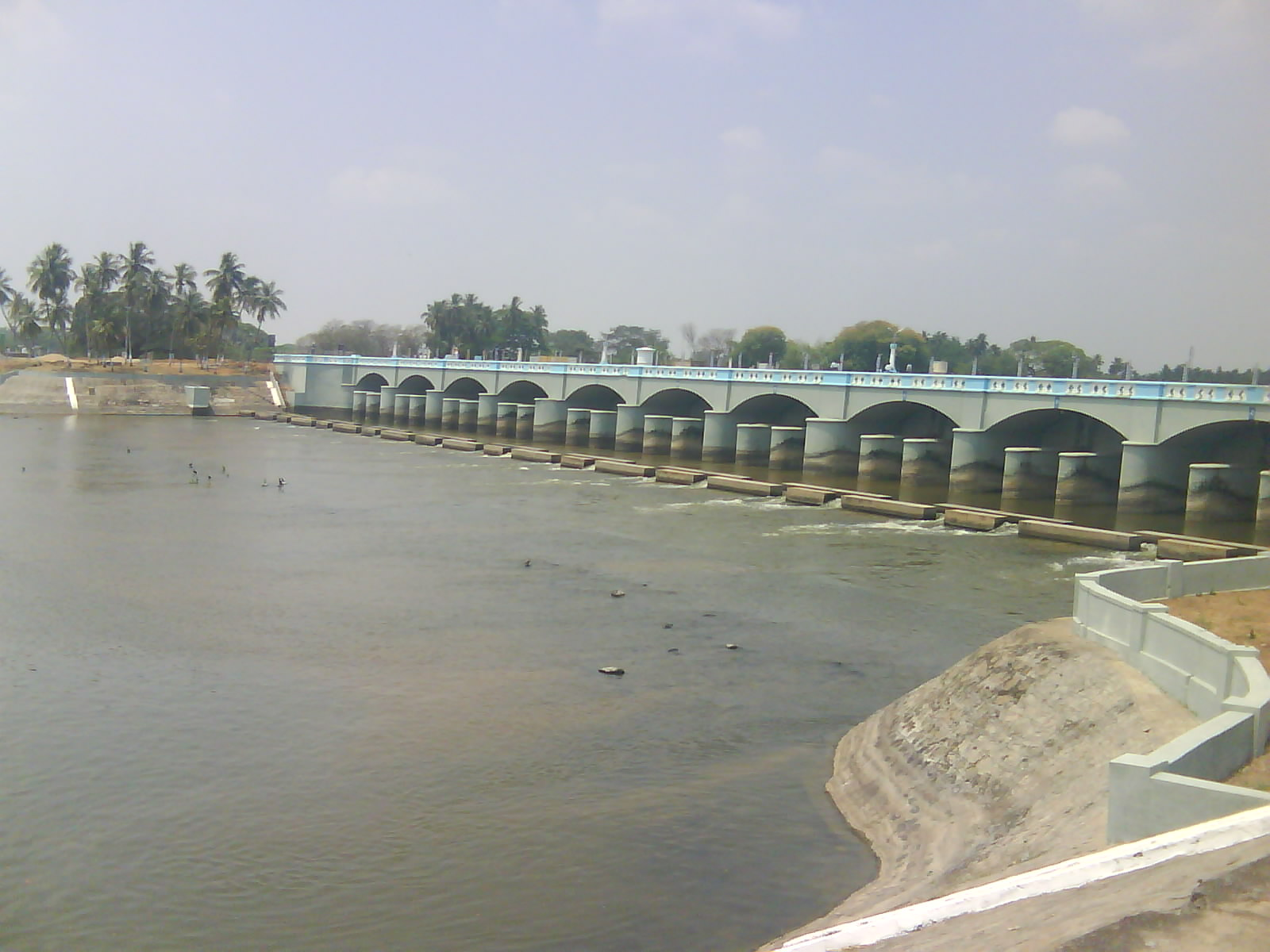
Kallanai built by Karikala Chola on river Kaveri

Sometime between the reign of Sinhalese monarch Vankanasika Tissa, Karikala, with a large army, invaded the island and took away 12,000 Sinhalese men to work as slaves to build the Kaveri Dam.

Later Chola kings attributed the building of dikes along the banks of the Kaveri to Karikala. The raising of the banks of the river Kaveri by Karikala is also mentioned by the Malepadu plates (seventh century CE) of the Telugu Chola sovereign of Renadu, Erigal-Mutturaju Punyakumara, who claims descent from Karikala: karuna – saroruha vihita – vilochana – pallava – trilochana pramukha kilapritvisvara karita kaveri tira (he who caused the banks of the Kaveri to be constructed by all the subordinate kings led by the Pallava Trilochana whose third eye was blinded by his lotus foot).

The Grand Anicut, also known as the Kallanai was built by Karikala and is considered one of the oldest water-diversion or water-regulator structures in the world which is still in use. The Kallanai is a massive dam of unhewn stone, 329 metres (1,080 ft) long and 20 metres (60 ft) wide, across the main stream of the Kaveri. The copper-plate charter of the Medieval Cholas records that Karikala “caused the Kavéri river to reach the ocean directly”. (Note: The statement that Karikala caused the Kaveri to “reach the ocean directly” may refer to hydraulic works associated with the regulation and diversion of the river's waters. Traditionally, the Kallanai (Grand Anicut) is attributed to Karikala and is understood to have regulated the flow of the Kaveri, directing surplus or floodwaters towards the Kollidam (Coleroon) while retaining the main flow in the Kaveri for irrigation.) A later Chola record from Thiruvaduthurai (Note: Inscription (110 of 1925) from the Masilamaniswara Temple, Thiruvaduthurai, in the present-day Mayiladuthurai district of Tamil Nadu.) inscription refers to this event that is raising the banks of the Kaveri by Parakesari Karikala Chola.

== Perur Patteeswarar Temple ==
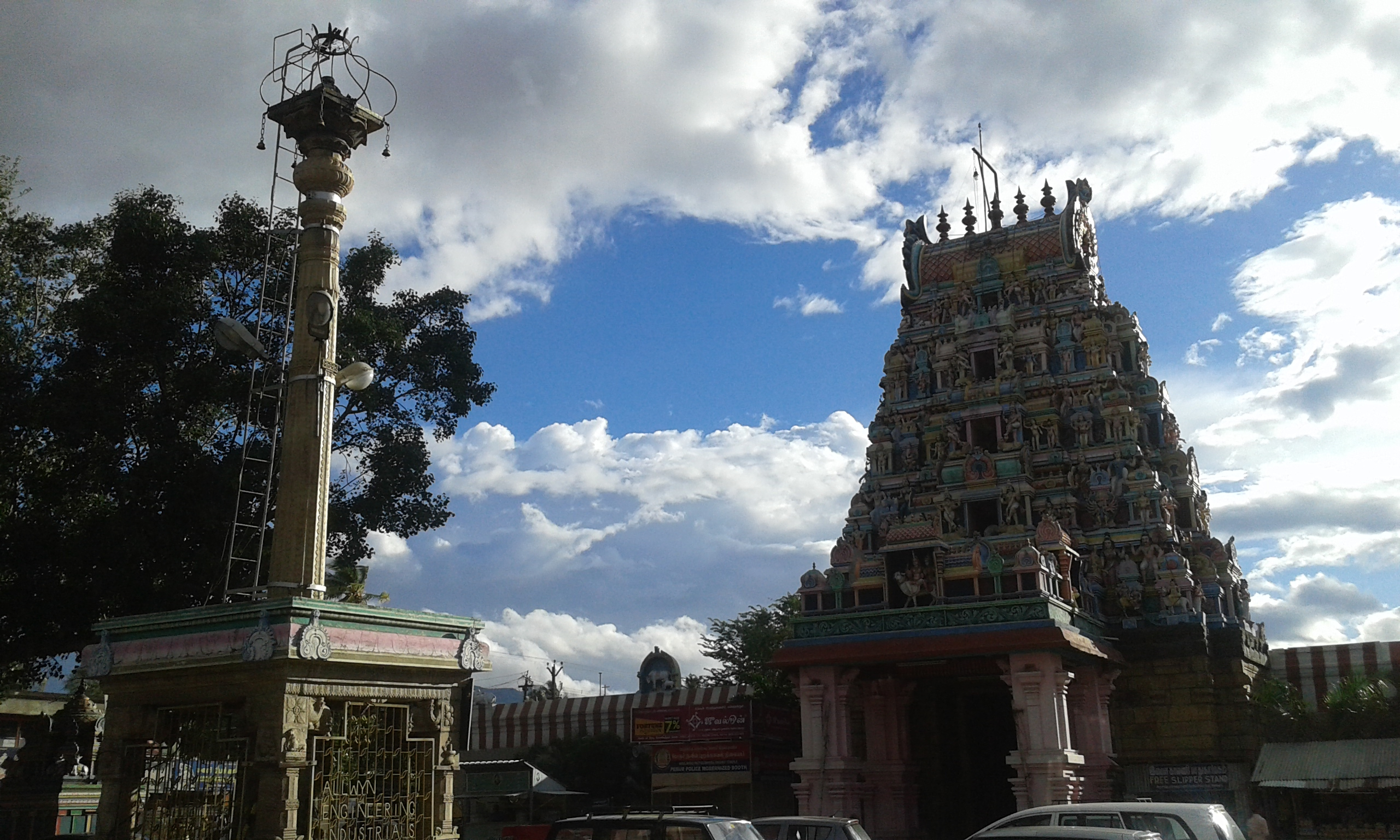
Perur Patteeswarar Temple

After his victory over the Northern kingdoms of Vatsa, Magadha and Avantika, Karikala returned to Tamil land and worshipped Lord Shiva at the Perur Pateeswarar Temple located at the banks of river Noyyal in present-day Coimbatore. Karikala was an ardent devotee of Lord Shiva. He is said to have done the Kumbhabhishekham (sanctification ritual) of the temple through a hundred golden vessels. A famous text named Perur Puranam was composed by Kachiyappa Munivar in Tamil on the origin of the temple.

=== Karikala Cholan Manimandapam ===
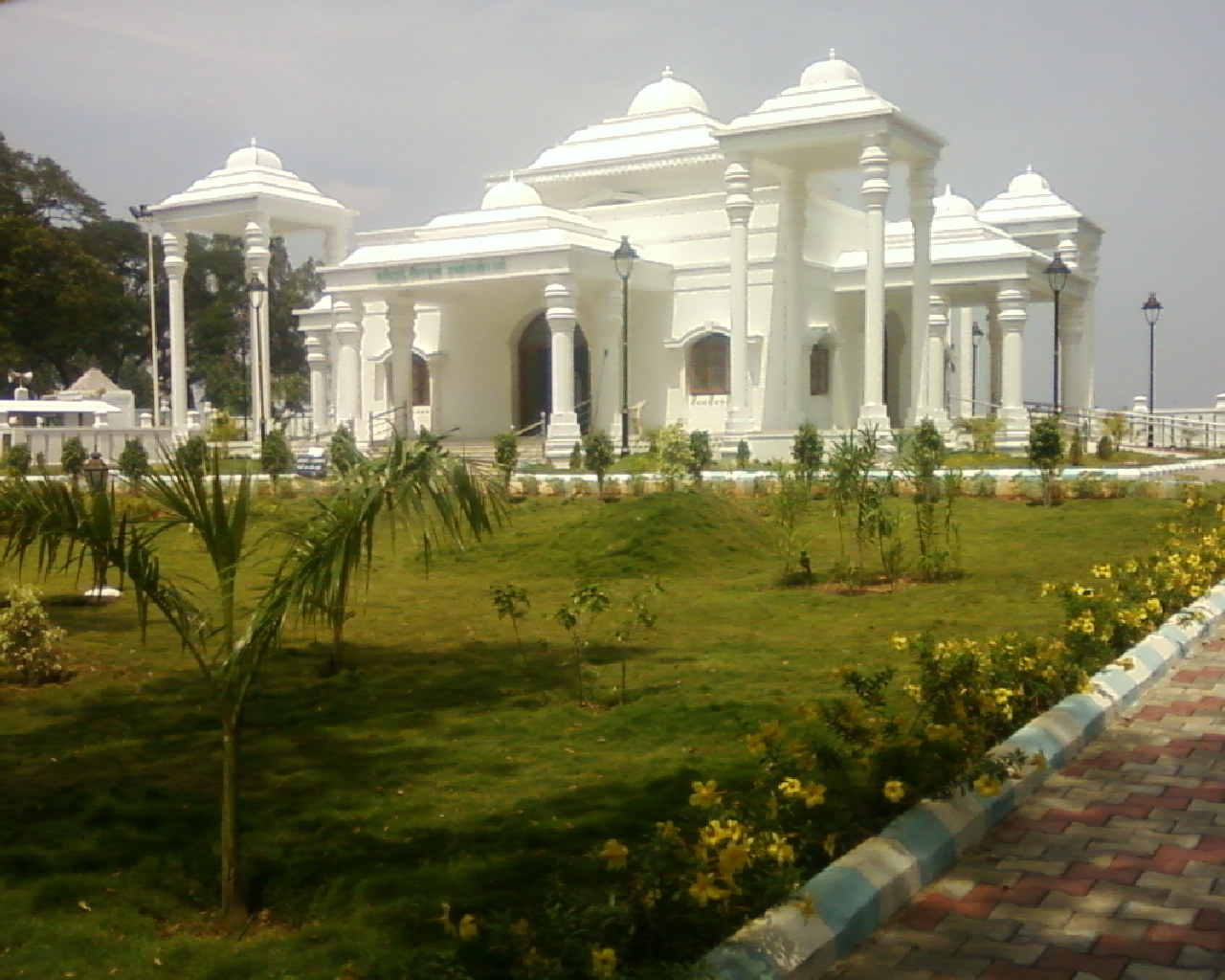
Karikala Cholan Manimandapam

Karikala Cholan Manimandapam (memorial hall) was built in honour of the king who built the Grand Anicut. The hall designed as per Chola architecture style was built at a cost of ₹ 21 million. It features a bronze statue of the king.

== Family and Legacy of Karikala ==
There is very little information available about Karikala's personal life. The author of Pattinappalai, Uruttirangannanar, briefly mentions that Karikala enjoyed the company of women and children.The later annotator Naccinarkkiniyar, perhaps drawing from a reliable tradition, adds that Karikala married a Velir woman from Nangur, a place known in the poems of Tirumangai Alvar for the valor of its warriors.

Karikala also had a daughter named Adimandi, who is the subject of several poems. After losing her husband, a Cera prince named Attan Atti, who drowned in the Kaveri river, Adimandi is said to have used her chastity to bring him back to life.

== Religious Beliefs and Death of Karikala ==
Karikala's devotion to the Vedic religion and the deep sorrow surrounding his death are powerfully expressed in the following lines by the poet Karungulal Adanar.

"He who stormed his enemies’ forts dauntlessly; who feasted his minstrels and their families and treated them to endless draughts of toddy; who, in the assembly of Brahmans noted for knowledge of dharma and purity of life, guided by priests learned in their duties and attended by his noble and virtuous queen, performed the vedic sacrifice in which the tall sacrificial post stood on a bird¬ like platform (garudacayana), within the sacrificial court surrounded by a high wall with round bastions; he, the great and wise king alas! is no more! Poor indeed is this world which has lost him. Like the branches of the v eng at tree, which stand bare, when their bright foliage has been cut down by shepherds eager to feed their cattle in the fierce summer, are his fair queens, who have cast off their jewels."

== Dating Karikala ==
According to Nilakanta Sastri Karikala reigned in 190 CE.

However, V. R. Ramachandra Dikshitar states that the Karikala mentioned in Silappadikaram and the Karikala in Sangam literature are two different kings and the Karikala mentioned in Silappadikaram has nothing to do with Trilocana Pallava and nothing prevents another Karikala having flourished in Puhar a few centuries later.

The copper-plate charters and stone inscription of the 10th and 11th centuries also mention two different Karikala thus unable to determine his exact reign.

== Descendants ==
Based on the literature, epigraphic evidence, and copper plate inscriptions, below are the various dynasties who claimed descent from Karikala Chola, and few used the title Lord of Uraiyur, which was the capital of Early Cholas.

- Imperial Cholas, ruled south India, Sri Lanka and South East Asia during 848–1279 CE.
- Durjaya, a legendary Andhra chieftain. Several ruling dynasties of medieval Andhra and Telangana, such as the Kakatiyas, Velanati Chodas, Malyalas, Viryalas, Haihayas, Konakandravadis, Ivani Kandravadis, Kondapadumatis, Natavadis, Parichchedis, Kotas, and Chagis, claimed descent from him.
- Kakatiya dynasty, ruled Andhra and Telangana during 1163–1323 CE.
- Nidugal Cholas, ruled parts of Karnataka, ruled during 12th to 14th century.
- Renati Chodas, ruled Rayalaseema, ruled from 5th century CE to 8th century CE.
- Pottapi Chodas, ruled Rayalaseema, ruled from 8th to 9th century CE.
- Konidena Chodas, ruled Kammanadu, from 950 to 1300 A.D.
- Nannuru Chodas ruled the region of Pakanadu.
- Nellore Chodas ruled south Andhra from 1100 to 1350 A.D.
- Kunduru Chodas, ruled Telangana region during 1080–1260 A.D.
- Eruva Cholas ruled Rajahmundry region during 1120–1330 A.D.

Telaga, a sub caste of Kapu in Andhra are linked to Telugu Chodas. Karikala Bhakthulu or Sengunthar caste in Andhra considers Karikala Chola as their hero.

== See also ==
- Legendary early Chola kings
- Tamil history from Sangam literature
- Chola Empire
- Chola Military
- List of Tamil monarchs
