= Kopperuncholan =

Chola Ruler
- Successor: Kochchenganan
- Dynasty: Chola

Kopperuncholan (Tamil: கோப்பெருஞ்சோழன்) was a Tamil king of the Early Cholas mentioned in Sangam Literature. The information we have about Kopperuncholan is from the fragmentary poems of Sangam in the Purananuru.

== Sources ==
The only source available to us on Kopperuncholan is the mentions in Sangam poetry. The period covered by the extant literature of the Sangam is unfortunately not easy to determine with any measure of certainty. Except the longer epics Silappatikaram and Manimekalai, which by common consent belong to the age later than the Sangam age, the poems have reached us in the forms of systematic anthologies. Each individual poem has generally attached to it a colophon on the authorship and subject matter of the poem, the name of the king or chieftain to whom the poem relates and the occasion which called forth the eulogy are also found.

It is from these colophons and rarely from the texts of the poems themselves, that we gather the names of many kings and chieftains and the poets patronised by them. The task of reducing these names to an ordered scheme in which the different generations of contemporaries can be marked off one another has not been easy. To add to the confusions, some historians have even denounced these colophons as later additions and untrustworthy as historical documents.

Any attempt at extracting a systematic chronology and data from these poems should be aware of the casual nature of these poems and the wide difference between the purposes of the anthologist who collected these poems and the historian’s attempts are arriving at a continuous history.

== Friendship with Poets ==
Kopperuncholan is the subject of a number of poems in Purananuru. Himself a poet, he is credited with a few poems in the Kuruntokai collection (Kuruntokai – 20, 53, 129, 147) and Purananuru (song 215). He was an intimate friend of many poets, the most notable among them being, Picirāntaiyār, Pullārrūr Eyiŗŗiyaņār and Pottiyār. Picirāntaiyār was a native of the Pandya country while the latter two were natives of Chola country. Pullārrūr Eyiŗŗiyaņār is renowned for his advice to the Chola king. Kopperuncholan’s friendship with these two poets became a classic example in later literature like that between Damon and Pythias.

Andayar’s poems reflect the happy and joyful nature of the poet. Asked once why though old, his hair had not turned gray, he gave this answer:

My years are many, yet my locks not grey:
You ask the reason why, 'tis simply this
I have a worthy wife, and children too;
My servants move obedient to my will;
My king does me no evil, aye protects;
To crown the whole, around me dwell good men
And true, of chastened souls with knowledge filled.
(Purananuru –191)

== Vellaikkudi Nakanar’s Devotion to Kopperuncholan ==
The following poem reveals Vellaikkudi Nakanar’s deep affection and loyalty toward King Kopperuncholan, which even surpassed his attachment to the ruler of his own native land. This expression of personal devotion highlights the strong emotional bond that often existed between Tamil poets and their royal patrons.

"If you ask us ‘who is your king?’ Our king is he who To the labourers gives strong palm-wine strained and
mellow,
And with the fat of turtle satiates their desire,
And fills their mouths with lampreys’ rich roast flesh. They leave short toil for feast; the feast prolong!
In that good fertile land the minstrels with their kin Find our king the foe of want and hunger’s pangs.
He is the lord of Kōḷi, the mighty Cōḷa king.
He loves converse with Potti, whose friendship knows no flaw.
All the day long he laughs with heart right glad!"[4]

== Kopperuncholan’s Suicide ==
There are a number of poems in Purananuru in sequence describing the sad end of this king.

Kopperuncholan and his two sons had a serious quarrel. His two sons vie the throne and raise an army against their father. As Kopperuncholan prepares for war, Pullārrūr Eyiŗŗiyaņār, a poet and a friend reasons with him that if he slays his own sons and wins the war then the country would be left without an heir, and on the other hand if he loses then they would become victors. So he advises the king to take his own life thereby leaving an heir to his kingdom and at the same time denying them all glory. The king would commit suicide by the rite of vadakiruttal, a Tamil act of committing suicide, where the victim sits facing north and starves himself to death. (Excerpt from Purananuru, song 213):

In the thick of the battle you show your strength, your white umbrella shines, king of victories. In this vast world, encircled by its roaring waters, two men have risen against you. They are not your old enemies with their established power..If they lose to whom will you leave your wealth? And if you lose, your enemies will be happy..Oh lord of furious battle, put down your weapons and quickly rising, show your courage. The shadow of your feet that helps the suffering must not lose its fame. You must do what is right. You must become a guest welcomed happily by the gods in that world so hard for men to attain

Kopperuncholan takes the advice of the poet and takes his own life by vadakirruttal along with those closest to him. But before he sits facing north with the sword by his side he informs his men of his desire to see his friend Picirāntaiyār, a poet in the neighboring Pandya kingdom. His men send word but then tell him that Picirāntaiyār may not come. To this the king replies, (excerpt from Purananuru, song 215):

..in the southern land of the Pandyan king, where they say Picirōn lives. I cannot die without him. He may have stayed away in good times but he will not fail me now.

Picirāntaiyār arrives and joins his friend in his desire to quit this world (Purananuru, the song (218) of Kannakanār as he saw Picirāntaiyār taking his seat and facing north). Another poet, Karuvūrp Peruñcatukkattup Pūtanātanār is distressed that the king forgot to invite him and sings thus: (Purananuru 219):

On an island in a river, in spotted shade, you sit and your body dries up.
Are you angry with me, warrior, who has asked so many to join you here?

After the king's death, Pottiyār another poet, unable to bear the loss of his patron, sits facing north amidst the heroes' stones and commits suicide by vadakirruttal. He reasons that the spirit of the dead king has given him permission to do so: (Purananuru - song 223);

You gave shade to many, the world praised you. And yet you could not finish your reign but had to reduce yourself to this small space, where you have become an undecaying stone. And the other stones surely will be kind and give me space, for I come to them with an old love that holds me to them like life to the body.

== The Tragic End of Kopperuncholan and His Poets ==
Two short poems depict King Kopperunjolan’s longing to see his dear friend Andai before his death, reflecting his calm assurance that Andai would not abandon him. True to this bond, Andai arrived in time and joined the king in his decision to renounce the world. Deeply moved, Pottiyar expressed profound admiration for the king’s nobility and Andai’s wisdom, while mourning the loss of a ruler whose virtues had so greatly inspired devotion, even from one who owed him no fealty.

Two additional poems commemorate the joint suicide of the king and Andai.One recounts that Andai fasted to death beneath a tree in the riverbed.When Pottiyar attempted to follow his companions in death, the king forbade him, urging him to delay until after his child was born.Obeying his friend’s final wish, Pottiyar returned to Uraiyur — and in the verses that followed, he poured out his grief and reverence for the departed monarch and poet.

"The keeper who has lost the huge elephant which he daily supplied
With its ample meal, and tended for many a year,
Is sad as he surveys the vacant pillar where it stood.
And weeps. Even so, did I not grieve when I beheld
The courtyard in the ancient town where Killi lived and died
Killi, with wealth of chariots, o’er which waves the conqueror's wreath?
When, a little later, he visited the spot of the king’s death, marked by a stone ( nadukal ), he was greatly moved by the recollection of his noble traits, 
 He had the praises manifold of minstrels whose wants he relieved.He was most loving to the dancers who resorted to his court;
He swayed his sceptre in accordance with the teaching of the sages:
His friendship had the firmness honoured of the wise;
He was gentle to women, brave in the face of the strong;
He was the refuge of the spotless learned ones.
Such an one death did not spare, but carried off his sweet souk
Therefore, my afflicted kinsfolk,   let us Embracing one another join in reviling death.
Come, all ye bards, whose words are true!
He hath become a pillar planted in the wild.
Crowned with imperishable praise!
While the wide world in sorrow   mourns.
Such is the lot of him who was our protector![11]

== See also ==
- Sangam Literature
- Early Cholas
- Legendary early Chola kings
