= Killivalavan =

Killivalavan கிள்ளி வளவன்
- Kulamuttrathu Tunjiya Killivalavan
- Predecessor: Nalankilli
- Successor: Kopperuncholan

Killivalavan (Tamil: கிள்ளிவளவன்) was a Tamil king of the Early Cholas mentioned in Sangam literature, and of a period close to that of Nedunkilli and Nalankilli. The information we have for Killivalavan is from the fragmentary poems of Sangam in the Purananuru.

== Killivalavan in Tamil history ==
Contemporary with Nalankilli and Nedunkilli, as indicated by the poets who praised all three rulers, Killivalavan was another prominent Chola king remembered for his valor and patronage.He is said to have died at Kulamurram. Another reference to a king named Killivalavan, found in a single poem by Kovur Kilar, mentions his death at Kurappalli. Scholars suggest that both references may point to the same ruler.Kovur Kilar’s poem, composed after Killivalavan’s capture of Karuvur, appears to describe a later phase of his conflict with the Chera kingdom, whereas Alattur Kilar’s poem portrays Karuvur still under siege.Sirukudi.

Killivalavan is celebrated in eighteen poems by ten different bards and is also credited with composing a verse himself in honor of his close friend Pabnan, the lord of Sirukudi.

== General sources ==
- Mudaliar, A.S, Abithana Chintamani (1931), Reprinted 1984 Asian Educational Services, New Delhi.
- Nilakanta Sastri, K.A. (1935). The CōĻas, University of Madras, Madras (Reprinted 1984).
- Nilakanta Sastri, K.A. (1955). A History of South India, OUP, New Delhi (Reprinted 2002).
- Project Madurai – Purananuru eText - http://tamilnation.co/literature/ettuthokai/pm0057.pdf
