= Nalankilli =

Nalankilli நலங்கிள்ளி
- Nalankilli Chola
- Reign: c. 415 BCE
- Predecessor: Nedunkilli
- Successor: Killivalavan
- Born: c. 445 BCE; Kaveri Poompattinam, Chola Kingdom, Tamilakam
- Died: c. 380 BCE; Ilavandigaippalli, Pandyan Kingdom, Tamilakam
- Father: Karikala Chola

Nalankilli (Tamil: நலங்கிள்ளி; [n̪aɭaŋɡiɭːi]; Middle Tamil: Nālankilli Cōḻaṉ; c. 445 BCE – c. 380 BCE) was a Tamil King of the Early Cholas of the Chola Dynasty who ruled Tamilakam (modern-day Southern India) and was mentioned in the ancient Sangam Literature. He was the son of the emperor Karikala Chola. Nalankilli was mentioned in context with a civil war between him and another Chola king Nedunkilli. The information known about him are from the fragmentary stanzas of the Purananuru and the Buddhist epic Manimekalai.

== Sources ==
according to Purananuru 31 , its describes nalankilli achivements :

"Like the great tradition where wealth and pleasure

follow righteousness, your tall umbrella shines alone, bright like the moon, followed by two umbrellas. Craving for great fame, you will not rest anywhere but in your camps, where battle victories are won. Your elephants attack enemy fort walls, their tusk tips get blunted, and they are out of control. Your warriors wearing anklets, who desire battles, enter countries with forests and very distant places, without complaining. You linger in your enemy country celebrating loud festivals, and leave the eastern ocean behind you as the white-topped waves of the western ocean laps the hooves of your horses. Afraid of you circling the earth, the kings of the northern countries are distressed, their hearts

trembling, and their eyes unable to sleep"

— Purananuru - 31

The source available to us on Nalankilli is mentioned in Sangam poetry and Manimekalai. The period covered by the extant literature of the Sangam is unfortunately not easy to determine with any measure of accurate certainty. Except the longer epics Cilappatikaram and Manimekalai, which by common consent belong to the Sangam age, the poems have reached us in the forms of systematic anthologies. Each individual poem has generally attached to it a colophon on the authorship and subject matter of the poem, the name of the king or chieftain to whom the poem relates and the occasion which called forth the eulogy are also found.

It is from these colophons and rarely from the texts of the poems themselves, that we gather the names of many kings and chieftains and the poets patronised by them. The task of reducing these names to an ordered scheme in which the different generations of contemporaries can be marked off one another has not been easy. To add to the confusions, some historians have even denounced these colophons as later additions and untrustworthy as historical documents.

Any attempt at extracting a systematic chronology and data from these poems should be aware of the casual nature of these poems and the wide difference between the purposes of the anthologist who collected these poems and the historian’s attempts are arriving at a continuous history.

== Nalankilli in Sangam literature ==
Nalankilli is the subject of no fewer than fourteen poems in the Purananuru. Among these, the poet Kovur Kilar contributes nearly half, suggesting that Nalankilli, like the renowned Karikala Chola, enjoyed a form of broad hegemony among the Tamil kingdoms. Kovur Kilar’s verses, though marked by poetic exaggeration, portray Nalankilli as a powerful and respected ruler within the Tamil political landscape.

== As a patron and contributor to literature ==
Like many princes of his time, Nalankilli was not only a patron of literature but also a poet himself. Two of his compositions have survived, one of which is notable for its unique and eerie tone — an uncanny oath that reflects both his literary skill and the distinctive style of royal expression during the Sangam age.

== As ruler ==
Nalankilli forms the subject of no fewer than fourteen poems in Purananuru. These poems suggest that Nalankilli continued to enjoy a vague hegemony among the other Tamil kings as did by Karikala Chola (Puranānūru – 31). The same poet Kovur Kilar, proving that he was not a sycophant, exhorts his patron to sue for peace instead of continuing the siege of Urayur against the rival Chola Nedunkilli.

Kaverippatinam was Nalankilli’s capital (Puranānūru – 30) and he enjoyed the benefits of its extensive trade. However the people were not in a contented state of mind due to the continuing civil strife. We perceive this from the melancholy tones of the poems by the poet Urayur Mudukannan Sattanar on Nalankilli (Puranānūru – 27, 28, 29).

Nalankilli like many other princes of his age, cultivated literature himself, and two of his poems survive. (Puranānūru – 72 and 73)

== Civil war ==
Purananuru speaks of the war between two Cholas Nalankilli and Nedunkilli, which lasted until the death of Nedunkilli at the battlefields of Kariyaru. These two Cholas must have belonged to the rival branches of the Chola families, which ruled from Kaverippattinam and Urayur as their capitals.

Kovur Kilar's pleadings were of no avail and the civil war only ended with the death of Nedunkilli.

Nalankilli died at a place called Ilavandigaippalli (colophon of Puranānūru – 61).

== See also ==
- Sangam Literature
- Early Cholas
- Legendary early Chola kings
