= Vatakkiruttal =

Tamil ritual of fasting till death

Vatakkiruttal (Tamil: வடக்கிருத்தல், Vaṭakkiruttal, 'fasting facing north'), also Vadakiruthal and vadakiruttal, was a Tamil ritual of fasting until death. The Tamil kings pledged a martial vow (Tamil: நோன்பு, nōnpu, 'vow') to meet their death "facing north", refusing to turn their backs in battle. Fasting was either performed alone or as a group among the supporters of the captured king. The practice was especially widespread during the Sangam age.

== Examples ==
- Poet Kapilar fasted at Kabilar Kundru following the death of his friend King Vēl Pāri in battle.
- King Kopperuncholan and his friend, the poet Pisiranthaiyar, committed suicide by Vatakkirruttal together.
