= Tamil literature in the Chola Empire =

Tamil literature during the Chola reign (9th–13th centuries CE)

Chola literature, written in Tamil, is the literature created during the period of Chola reign in South India between the 9th and the 13th centuries CE. The age of the imperial Cholas was the most creative epoch of the history of South India and was the Golden Age of Tamil culture.
