= Ilamchetchenni =

- Cerup - paali-Yerinta - ilancedcenni (Destroyer of Seruppali )

Chola King
- Reign: c. 501 BCE – 470 BCE
- Successor: Karikala
- Born: Uraiyur, Chola Kingdom (now in Tiruchirapalli, Tamil Nadu, India)
- Died: c. 470 BCE; Puhar, Chola Kingdom (now Poombuhar, Mayiladuthurai district, Tamil Nadu, India)
- Consort: Alundur
- Issue: Karikala
- Dynasty: Chola
- Religion: Shaivism

Ilamchetchenni (Iḷamcēṭceṉṉi; [iɭəmt͡ɕeːt͡ɕːsen̪ːi] c. 501 BCE தமிழ் : இளஞ்சேட்சென்னி) was an early Tamil king of the Chola dynasty during the Sangam period. He was a great warrior and ruled the Chola kingdom with Uraiyur as the capital. He married a Velir princess from Alundur and their child was Karikala Chola. Ilamchetchenni Chola was succeeded by his son, Karikala Chola, who is considered one of the greatest among the Early Cholas.

== Claims ==
N.K. Sastri claims that this is the period when the Maurya dynasty established its empire from Persia to southern India. Bindusara, son of Chandragupta Maurya, conquered much of India besides Kalinga and the Cholas. Fragmentary Sangam poems in the Purananuru state that Ilamchetchenni Cholan successfully resisted unknown Aryan army with chariots invasion in the southern region of the Indian subcontinent. Sastri claims that Ilamchetchenni reigned from 501 BCE to 470 BCE, when the Cholas dominated the Chera and Pandya dynasties.

== See also ==
- Early Cholas
- Chola Empire
- Chola dynasty
- History of India
- History of South India
