= Cilappatikaram =

Ancient Tamil Jain epic

Cilappatikāram (Tamil: சிலப்பதிகாரம்) (Tamil pronunciation: [ʧiləppət̪ikɑːrəm], lit. 'the Tale of an Anklet'), also referred to as Silappathikaram or Silappatikaram, is the earliest Tamil epic. It is a poem of 5,730 lines in almost entirely akaval (aciriyam) meter. The epic is a tragic love story of an ordinary couple, Kaṇṇaki and her husband Kōvalaṉ. The Cilappatikāram has more ancient roots in the Tamil bardic tradition, as Kannaki and other characters of the story are mentioned or alluded to in the Sangam literature such as in the Natṟiṇai and later texts such as the Kovalam Katai. It is attributed to a prince-turned-jain-monk Iḷaṅkō Aṭikaḷ, and was probably composed in the 5th century CE (although estimates range from 2nd to 6th century CE).

The Cilappatikāram is an ancient literary masterpiece. It is to the Tamil culture what the Iliad is to the Greek culture, states R. Parthasarathy. It blends the themes, mythologies and theological values found in the Jain, Buddhist and Hindu religious traditions. It is a Tamil story of love and rejection, happiness and pain, good and evil like all classic epics of the world. Yet unlike other epics that deal with kings and armies caught up with universal questions and existential wars, the Cilappatikāram is an epic about an ordinary couple caught up with universal questions and internal, emotional war. The Cilappatikaram legend has been a part of the Tamil oral tradition. The palm-leaf manuscripts of the original epic poem, along with those of the Sangam literature, were rediscovered in monasteries in the second half of the 19th century by UV Swaminatha Aiyar – a pandit and Tamil scholar. After being preserved and copied in temples and monasteries in the form of palm-leaf manuscripts, Aiyar published its first partial edition on paper in 1872, the full edition in 1892. Since then the epic poem has been translated into many languages including English.

== Plot ==
The Cilappatikāram is set in a flourishing seaport city of the early Chola kingdom. Kaṇṇaki and Kōvalaṉ are a newly married couple, in love, and living in bliss. Over time, Kōvalaṉ meets Mātavi (Mādhavi) – a courtesan. He falls for her, leaves Kaṇṇaki and moves in with Mātavi. He spends lavishly on her. Kaṇṇaki is heartbroken, but as the chaste woman, she waits despite her husband's unfaithfulness. During the festival for Indra, the rain god, there is a singing competition. Kōvalaṉ sings a poem about a woman who hurt her lover. Mātavi then sings a song about a man who betrayed his lover. Each interprets the song as a message to the other. Kōvalaṉ feels Mātavi is unfaithful to him and leaves her. Kaṇṇaki, still waiting for him, takes him back.

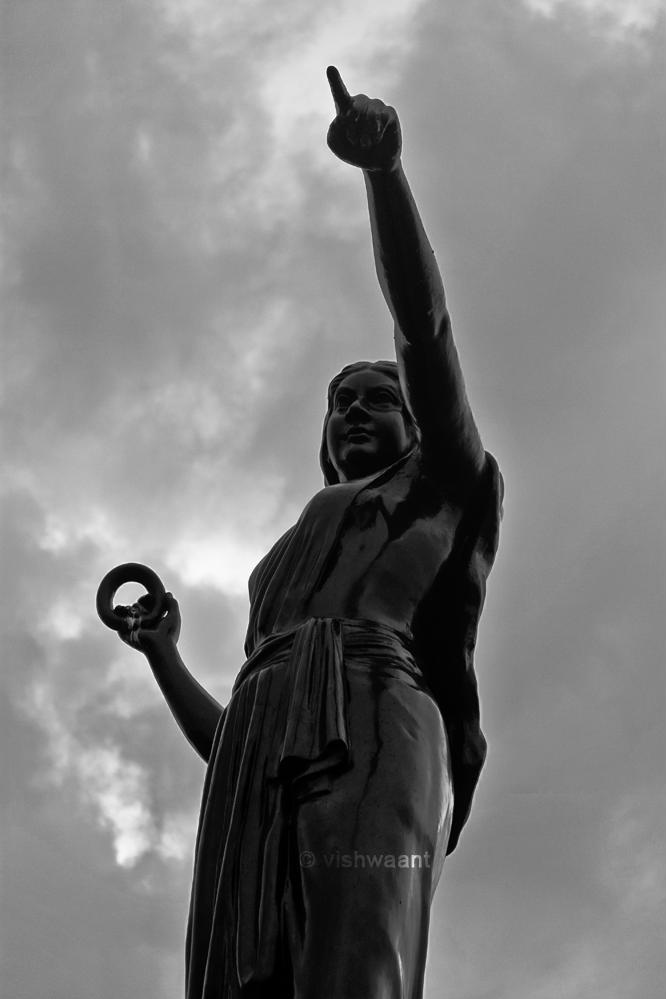
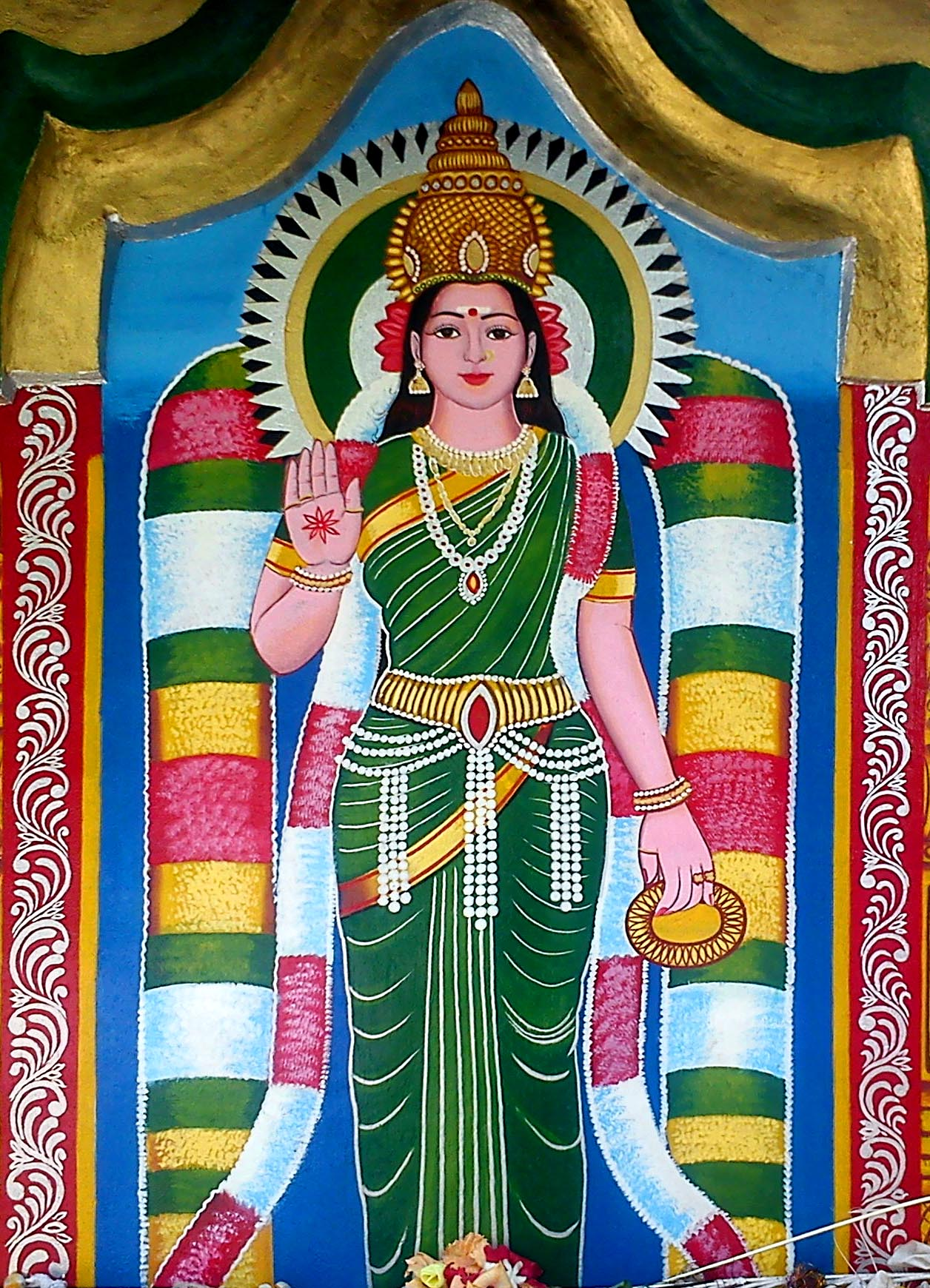
Kaṇṇaki (above) is the central character of the Cilappatikāram epic. Statues, reliefs and temple iconography of Kannaki are found particularly in Tamil Nadu and Kerala.

Kannagi and Kōvalaṉ leave the city and travel to Madurai, the capital of the Pandya kingdom. Kōvalaṉ is penniless and destitute. He confesses his deceit to Kannagi. She forgives him and describes him the hurt his adultery caused her. Then, she encourages her husband to rebuild their life together, and gives him one of her jeweled anklets to sell to raise starting capital. Kōvalaṉ sells it to a merchant, but the merchant falsely frames him as having stolen the anklet from the queen. The king arrests Kōvalaṉ and then executes him, without the due checks and processes of justice. When Kōvalaṉ does not return home, Kannagi goes searching for him. She learns what has happened. She protests the injustice and then proves Kōvalaṉ's innocence by throwing in the court the other jeweled anklet of the pair. The king accepts his folly. Kannagi curses the king and the people of Madurai, tearing off her breast and throwing it at the gathered public. The king dies. The society that had made her suffer, suffers in retribution as the city of Madurai is burnt to the ground because of her curse.

In the third section of the epic, gods and goddesses meet Kannagi at Cheranadu and she goes to heaven with the god Indra. The king Cheran Chenkuttuvan and royal family of the Chera kingdom (today Kerala) learn about her and resolve to build a temple with Kannagi as the featured goddess. They go to the Himalayas, bring a stone, carve her image, call her goddess Pattini, dedicate a temple, order daily prayers, and perform a royal sacrifice.

== Nomenclature ==
According to V R Ramachandra Dikshitar, the title Silappatikāram – also spelled Silappadikaram – is a combination of two words, "silambu" (anklet) and "adikaram" (the story about). It therefore connotes a "story that centers around an anklet". The content and context around that center is elaborate, with Atiyarkkunallar describing it as an epic story told with poetry, music, and drama.

== Author ==
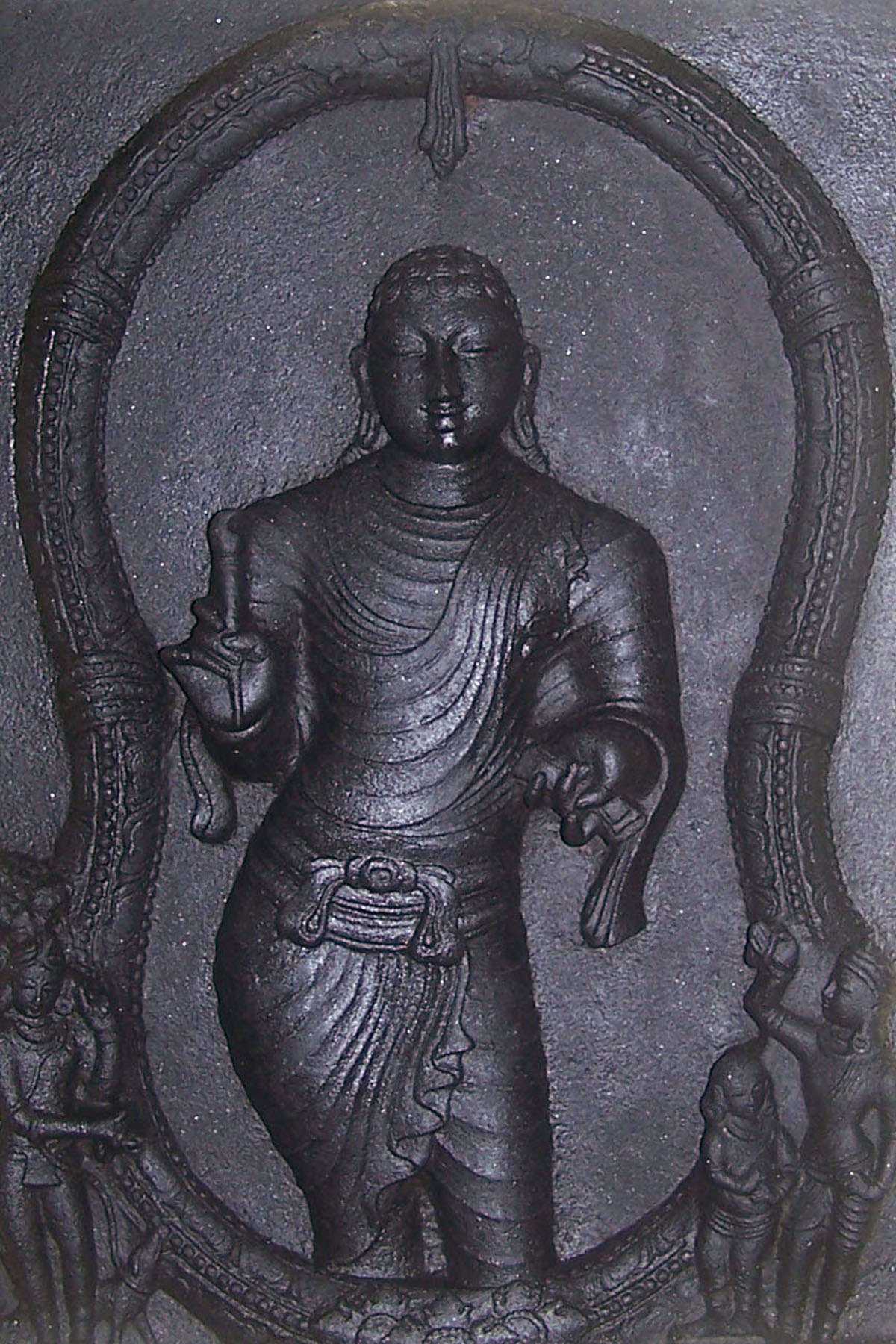
Statues and reliefs of Ilango Adigal are found in India and Sri Lanka. He is believed to be the author of Cilappatikāram.

The Tamil tradition attributes Cilappatikaram to the Iḷaṅkō Aṭikaḷ ("the venerable ascetic prince"), also spelled Ilango Adigal. He is reputed to have been a Jain Monk and the brother of Chera king Chenkuttuvan, whose family and rule are described in the Fifth Ten of the Patiṟṟuppattu, a poem of the Sangam literature. In it or elsewhere, however, there is no evidence that the famous king had a brother. V. Kanakasabhai opined that Ilango was a monk of a nirgrantha sect of Jain. The Sangam poems never mention Ilango Adigal, the epic or the name of any other author for the epic. The Ilango Adigal name appears in a much later dated patikam (prologue) attached to the poem, and the authenticity of this attribution is doubtful. According to Gananath Obeyesekere, the story of the purported Cilappadikaram author Ilango Adigal as the brother of a famous Chera king "must be later interpolations", something that was a characteristic feature of early literature.

The mythical third section about gods meeting Kannaki after Kovalan's death, in the last Canto, mentions a legend about a prince turned into a monk. This has been conflated as the story of the attributed author as a witness. However, little factual details about the real author(s) or evidence exist. Given the fact that older Tamil texts mention and allude to the Kannaki's tragic love story, states Parthasarathy, the author was possibly just a redactor of the oral tradition and the epic poem was not a product of his creative genius. The author was possibly a Jaina scholar, as in several parts of the epic, the key characters of the epic meet a Jaina monk or nun. The epic's praise of the Vedas, Brahmins, inclusion of temples, Hindu gods and goddesses and ritual worship give the text a cosmopolitan character, and to some scholars' evidence to propose that author was not necessarily a Jaina ascetic.

According to Ramachandra Dikshitar, the ascetic-prince legend about Ilango Adigal as included in the last canto of Cilappadikaram is odd. In the epic, Ilango Adigal attends a Vedic sacrifice with the Chera king Cenkuttuvan after the king brings back the Himalayan stone to make a statue of Kannaki. If the author Ilango Adigal was a Jain ascetic and given our understanding of Jainism's historic view on the Vedas and Vedic sacrifices, why would he attend a function like the Vedic sacrifice, states Ramachandra Dikshitar. This, and the fact that the epic comfortably praises Shaiva and Vaishnava lifestyle, festivals, gods and goddesses, has led some scholars to propose that author of this epic was a Hindu.

Ilango Adigal has been suggested to be a contemporary of Sattanar, the author of Maṇimēkalai. However, evidence for such suggestions has been lacking.

== Date ==
In the modern era, some Tamil scholars have linked the Ilango Adigal legend about his being the brother of king Cenkuttuvan, as a means to date this text. A Chera king Cenkuttuvan is tentatively placed in the 100–250 CE, and the traditionalists, therefore, place the text to the same period. In 1939, for example, the Tamil literature scholar Ramachandra Dikshitar presented a number of events mentioned within the text and thereby derived that the text was composed about 171 CE. According to Dhandayudham, the epic should be dated to between the 3rd and 5th century. Ramachandra Dikshitar analysis that the epic was composed before the Pallava dynasty emerged as a major power in the 6th-century is accepted by most scholars, because there is no mention of the highly influential Pallavas in the epic. His chronological estimate of 171 CE for Cilappadikaram cannot be far from the real date of composition, states Alain Daniélou – a French Indologist who translated the Cilappadikaram in 1965. Daniélou states that the epic – along with the other four Tamil epics – were all composed sometime between the last part of the Sangam and the subsequent centuries, that is "3rd to 7th-century".

Other scholars, such as Kamil Zvelebil – a Tamil literature and history scholar, state that the legends in the epic itself are a weak foundation for dating the text. A stronger foundation is the linguistics, events and other sociological details in the text when compared to those in other Tamil literature, new words and grammatical forms, and the number of non-Tamil loan words in the text. The Sangam era texts of the 100–250 CE period are strikingly different in style, language structure, the beliefs, the ideologies, and the customs portrayed in the Cilappatikāram, which makes the early dating implausible. Further, the epic's style, structure and other details are quite similar to the texts composed centuries later. These point to a much later date. According to Zvelebil, the Cilappatikāram that has survived into the modern era "cannot have been composed before the 5th- to 6th-century".

According to other scholars, such as Iyengar, the first two sections of the epic were likely the original epic, and third mythical section after the destruction of Madurai is likely a later extrapolation, an addendum that introduces a mix of Jaina, Hindu and Buddhist stories and practices, including the legend about the ascetic prince. The hero (Kōvalaṉ) is long dead, and the heroine (Kaṇṇaki) follows him shortly thereafter into heaven, as represented in the early verses of the third section. This part adds nothing to the story, is independent, is likely to be of a much later century.

Other scholars, including Zvelebil, state that this need not necessarily be so. The third section covers the third of three major kingdoms of the ancient Tamil region, the first section covered the Cholas and the second the Pandya. Further, states Zvelebil, the deification of Kaṇṇaki keeps her theme active and is consistent with the Tamil and the Indian tradition of merging a legend into its ideas of rebirth and endless existence. The language, and style of the third section is "perfectly homogeneous" with the first two, it does not seem to be the work of multiple authors, and therefore the entire epic should be considered a complete masterpiece. Fred Hardy, in contrast, states that some sections have clearly and cleverly been interpolated into the main epic, and these additions may be of 7th- to 8th century. Daniélou concurs that the epic may have been "slightly" reshaped and enlarged in the centuries after the original epic was composed, but the epic as it has survived into the modern age is quite homogeneous and lacks evidence of additions by multiple authors.

Iravatham Mahadevan states that the mention of a weekday (Friday) in the text and the negative portrayal of a Pandya king narrows the probable date of composition to between 450 and 550 CE. This is because the concept of weekdays did not exist in India until the 5th century CE, and the Pandya dynasty only regained power in 550 CE, thus meaning that Jains could freely criticise them without any threat to their lives.

== Contents ==
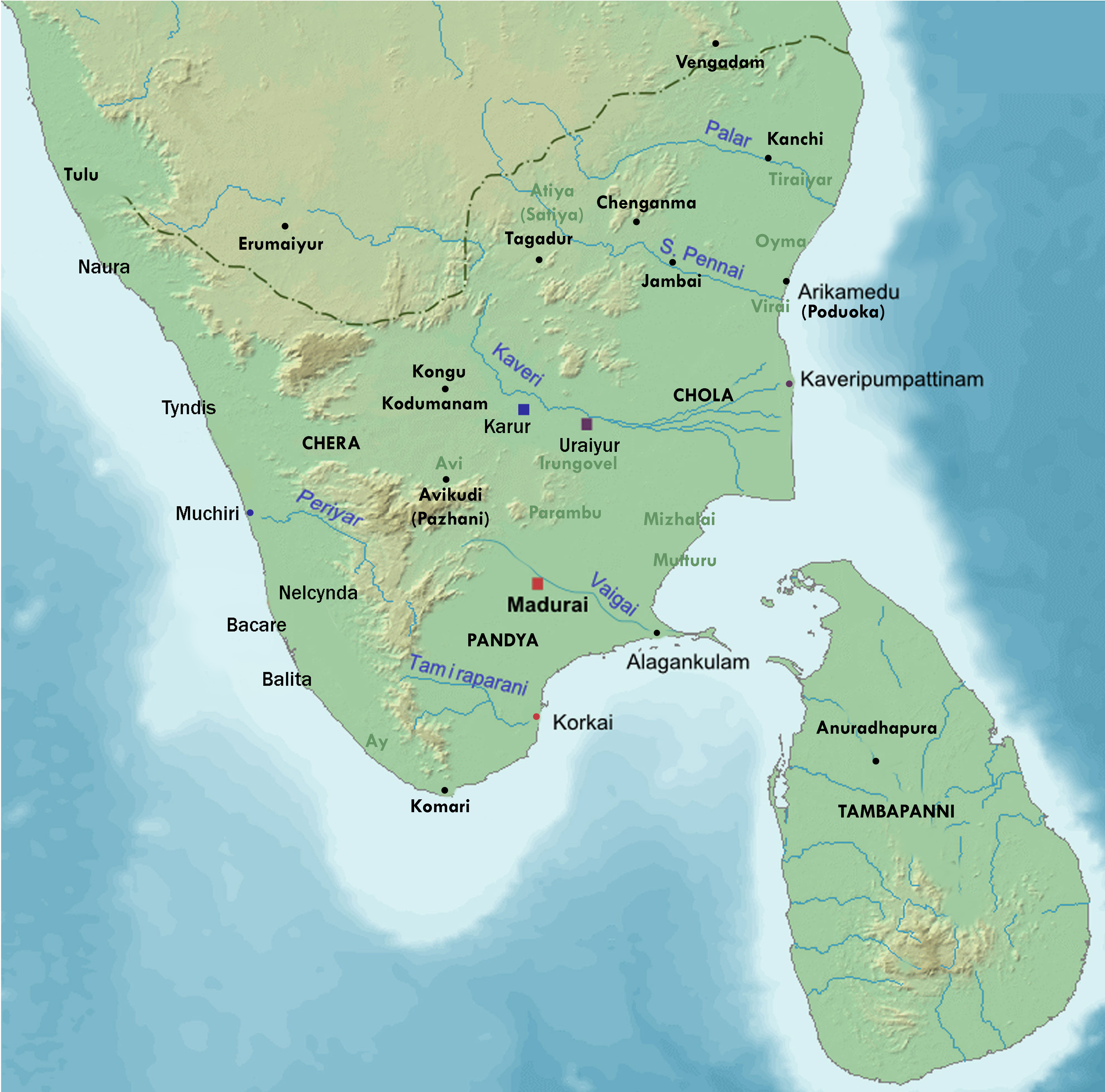
The epic is based in the ancient kingdoms of Chola (Book 1), Pandya (Book 2) and Chera (Book 3).

=== Structure of Cilappatikaram ===
The Cilappatikaram is divided into three kantams (book, Skt: khanda), which are further subdivided into katais (cantos, Skt: katha). The three kantams are named after the capitals of the three major early Tamil kingdoms:

- Pugarkkandam (Tamil: புகார்க் காண்டம்), based in the Chola capital of Pugar (Kaveripoompattinam, where river Kaveri meets the Bay of Bengal). This book is where Kannagi and Kovalan start their married life and Kovalan leaves his wife for the courtesan Madhavi. This contains 9 cantos or divisions. The first book is largely akam (erotic love) genre.
- Maturaikkandam (Tamil: மதுரைக் காண்டம்), based in Madurai which then was the capital of the Pandya kingdom. This book is where the stories about the couple are told after leaving Puhar and as they try to rebuild their lives. This is also where Kovalan is unjustly executed after being falsely framed for stealing the queen's anklet. This book ends with the apotheosis of Kannaki, as gods and goddesses meet her and she herself is revealed as a goddess. The second book contains 11 cantos and belongs to the puranam (mythic) genre of Tamil literature, states Parthasarathy.
- Vanchikkandam (Tamil: வஞ்சிக் காண்டம்), based in the capital of Chera country, Vanci. The third book begins after Kannaki has ascended to the heavens in the chariot of Indra. The epic tells the legends around the Chera king, queen and army resolving to build a temple for her as goddess Pattini. It contains the Chera journey to the Himalayas, the battles along the way and finally the successful completion of the temple for Kannaki's worship. This book contains 5 cantos. The book is the puram (heroic) genre.

The katais range between 53 and 272 lines each. In addition to the 25 cantos, the epic has 5 song cycles:

- The love songs of the seaside grove
- The song and dance of the hunters
- The round dance of the herdswomen
- The round dance of the hill dwellers
- The benediction

=== Main characters ===
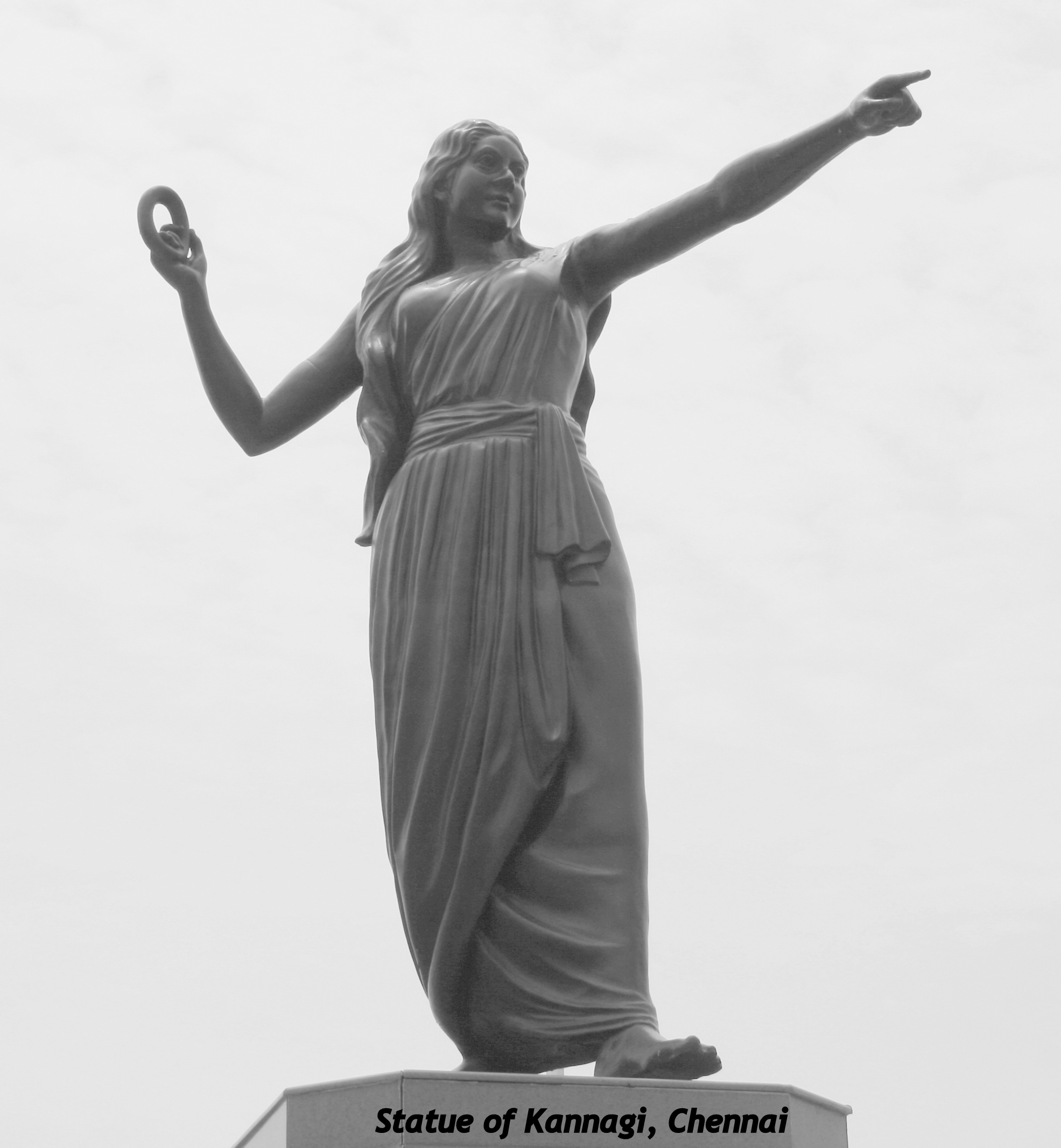
Statue of Kannagi at Chennai Marina Beach.

- Kannaki – the heroine and central character of the epic; she is the simple, quiet, patient and faithful housewife fully dedicated to her unfaithful husband in book 1; who transforms into a passionate, heroic, rage-driven revenge seeker of injustice in book 2; then becomes a goddess that inspires Chera people to build her temple, invade, fight wars to get a stone from the Himalaya, make a statue of Kannaki and begin the worship of goddess Pattini. Lines 1.27–29 of the epic introduces her with allusions to the Vedic mythology of Samudra Manthana, as, "She is Lakshmi herself, goddess of peerless beauty that rose from the lotus, and chaste as the immaculate Arundhati".
- Kovalan - husband of Kannaki, son of a wealthy charitable kind merchant in the seaport capital city of early Chola kingdom at Poompuhar; Kovalan inherits his wealth, is handsome, and the women of the city want him. The epic introduces him in lines 1.38–41 with "Seasoned by music, with faces luminous as the moon, women confided among themselves: "He [Kovalan] is the god of love himself, the incomparable Murukan". His parents and Kannaki's parents meet and arrange their marriage, and the two are married in Canto 1 of the epic around the ceremonial fire with a priest completing the holy wedding rites. For a few years, Kannaki and he live a blissful householder's life together. The epic alludes to this first phase of life as (lines 2.112–117), "Like snakes coupled in the heat of passion, or Kama and Rati smothered in each other's arms, so Kovalan and Kannakai lived in happiness past speaking, spent themselves in every pleasure, thinking: we live on earth but a few days", according to R Parthasarathy's translation.
- Madhavi - A young, beautiful courtesan dancer; the epic introduces her in Canto 3 and describes her as descended from the line of Urvasi – the celestial dancer in the court of Indra. She studied folk and classical dances for seven years from the best teachers of the Chola kingdom, perfecting the postures and rhythmic dancing to all musical instruments and revered songs. She is spellbinding on stage and wins the highest award for her dance performance: a garland made of 1,008 gold leaves and flowers.
- Vasavadaththai - Madhavi's female friend
- Kosigan - Madhavi's messenger to Kovalan
- Madalan - A Brahmin visitor to Madurai from Poomphuhar (Book 2)
- Kavunthi Adigal - A Jain nun (Book 2)
- Netunceliyan I - Pandya king (Book 2)
- Kopperundevi - Pandya Queen (Book 2)
- Indra – the god who brings Kannaki to Heaven (Book 3)
- Senguttuvan - Chera king who invades and defeats all Deccan and north Indian kingdoms to bring a stone from the Himalayas for a temple dedicated to Kannaki (Book 3)

=== Story ===
Canto V of Silappadikaram
The entire Canto V is devoted to the festival of Indra, which takes place in the ancient city of Puhar. The festivities begin at the temple of the white elephant [Airavata, the mount of Indra] and they continue in the temples of Unborn Shiva, of Murugan [beauteous god of Youth], of nacre white Valliyon [Balarama] brother of Krishna, of dark Vishnu called Nediyon, and of Indra himself with his string of pearls and his victorious parasol. Vedic rituals are performed and stories from the Puranas are told, while temples of the Jains and their charitable institutions can be seen about the city.

— Elizabeth Rosen, Review of Alain Daniélou's translation of Silappatikaram

Book 1

The Cilappatikaram is set in a flourishing seaport city of the early Chola kingdom. Kannaki and Kovalan are a newly married couple, in love, and living in bliss. Over time, Kovalan meets Matavi (Madhavi) – a courtesan. He falls for her, leaves Kannaki and moves in with Matavi. He spends lavishly on her. Kannaki is heartbroken, but as the chaste woman, she waits despite her husband's unfaithfulness. During the festival for Indra, the rain god, there is a singing competition. Kovalan sings a poem about a woman who hurt her lover. Matavi then sings a song about a man who betrayed his lover. Each interprets the song as a message to the other. Kovalan feels Matavi is unfaithful to him and leaves her. Kannaki is still waiting for him. She takes him back.

Book 2

Kannaki and Kovalan leave the city and travel to Madurai of the Pandya kingdom. Kovalan is penniless and destitute. He confesses his mistakes to Kannaki. She forgives him and tells him the pain his unfaithfulness gave her. Then she encourages her husband to rebuild their life together and gives him one of her jeweled anklets to sell to raise starting capital. Kovalan sells it to a merchant, but the merchant falsely frames him as having stolen the anklet from the queen. The king arrests Kovalan and then executes him, without the due checks and processes of justice. When Kovalan does not return home, Kannaki goes searching for him. She learns what has happened. She protests the injustice and then proves Kovalan's innocence by throwing in the court the other jeweled anklet of the pair. The king accepts his mistake. Kannaki curses the king and curses the people of Madurai, tearing off her breast and throwing it at the gathered public, triggering the flames of a citywide inferno. The remorseful king dies in shock. Madurai is burnt to the ground because of her curse. The violence of the Kannaki fire kills everyone, except "only Brahmins, good men, cows, truthful women, cripples, old men and children", states Zvelebil.

Book 3

Kannaki leaves Madurai and heads into the mountainous region of the Chera kingdom. Gods and goddesses meet Kannaki, the king of gods Indra himself comes with his chariot, and Kannaki goes to heaven with Indra. The royal family of the Chera kingdom learns about her, resolves to build a temple with Kannaki as the featured goddess. They go to the Himalayas, bring a stone, carve her image, call her goddess Pattini, dedicate a temple, order daily prayers, and perform a royal sacrifice.

== Literary value and significance ==
The manuscripts of the epic include a prologue called patikam. This is likely a later addition to the older epic. It, nevertheless, shows the literary value of the epic to later Tamil generations:

We shall compose a poem, with songs,
To explain these truths: even kings, if they break
The law, have their necks wrung by dharma;
Great men everywhere commend
wife of renowned fame; and karma ever
Manifests itself, and is fulfilled. We shall call the poem
The Cilappatikāram, the epic of the anklet,
Since the anklet brings these truths to light.

Twenty-five cantos of the Cilappatikaram are set in the akaval meter, a meter found in the more ancient Tamil Sangam literature. It has verses in other meters and contains five songs also in a different meter. These features suggest that the epic was performed in the form of stage drama that mixed recitation of cantos with the singing of songs. The 30 cantos were reciting as monologues.

=== Sanskrit epics ===
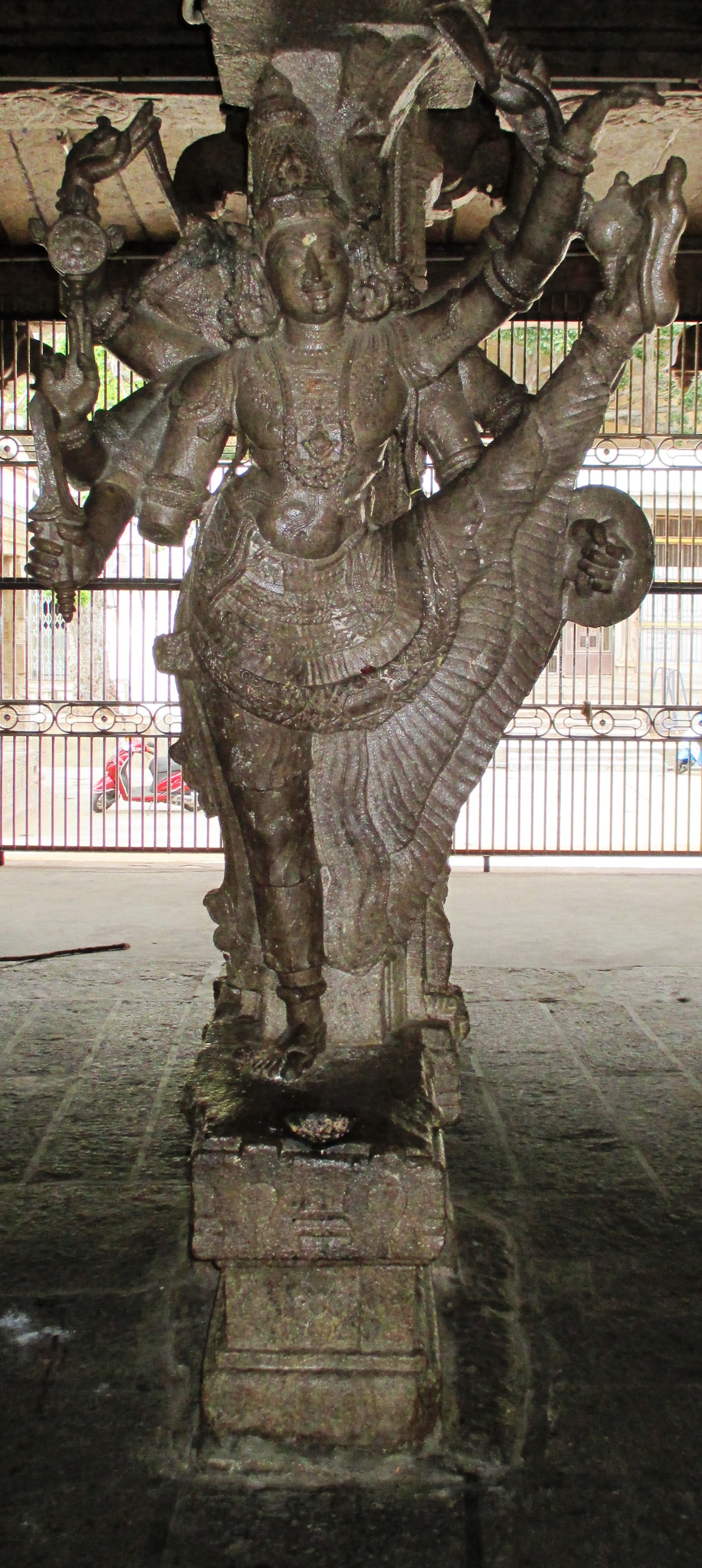
Sculpture of Vishnu as the god who measured the 3 worlds in Kallalagar Temple.

The Tamil epic has many references and allusions to the Sanskrit epics and puranic legends. For example, it describes the fate of Poompuhar suffering the same agony as experienced by Ayodhya when Rama leaves for exile to the forest as instructed by his father. The Aycciyarkuravai section (canto 27), makes mention of the Lord who could measure the three worlds, going to the forest with his brother, waging a war against Lanka and destroying it with fire. These references indicate that the Ramayana was known to the Cilappatikaram audience many centuries before the Kamba Ramayanam of the 12th century CE.

The 17th canto of the epic explains the Beauty and greatness of Lord Vishnu with respect to his forms and Various incarnations. Vishnu was the deity most mentioned in Tamil Sangam literature and is said to be one of the favourite gods of the people who lived in the Sangam time. The epic states that "Vain are the ears which do not hear the glory of Rama who is Vishnu, Vain are the eyes which do not see the dark hued Lord, the great God, the Mayavan Vishnu, Vain is the tongue that will not praise him who triumphed over the deceit of the foolish schemer Kamsa (Krishna), Vain is the tongue which does not say 'Narayana'.

According to Zvelebil, the Cilappatikaram mentions the Mahabharata and calls it the "great war", just like the story was familiar to the Sangam era poets too as evidenced in Puram 2 and Akam 233. One of the poets is nicknamed as "The Peruntevanar who sang the Bharatam [Mahabharatam]", once again confirming that the Tamil poets by the time Cilappatikaram was composed were intimately aware of the Sanskrit epics, the literary structure and significance of Mahakavyas genre. To be recognized as an accomplished extraordinary poet, one must compose a great kavya has been the Tamil scholarly opinion prior to the modern era, states Zvelebil. These were popular and episodes from such maha-kavya were performed as a form of dance-drama in public. The Cilappatikaram is a Tamil epic that belongs to the pan-India kavya epic tradition. The Tamil tradition and medieval commentators such as Mayilaintar have included the Cilappatikaram as one of the aimperunkappiyankal, which literally means "five great kavyas".

According to D. Dennis Hudson – a World Religions and Tamil literature scholar, the Cilappatikaram is the earliest and first complete Tamil reference to Pillai (Nila, Nappinnai, Radha), who is described in the epic as the cowherd lover of Krishna. The epic includes abundant stories and allusions to Krishna and his stories, which are also found in ancient Sanskrit Puranas. In the canto where Kannaki is waiting for Kovalan to return after selling her anklet to a Madurai merchant, she is in a village with cowgirls. These cowherd girls enact a dance, where one plays Mayavan (Krishna), another girl plays Tammunon (Balarama), while a third plays Pinnai (Radha). The dance begins with a song listing Krishna's heroic deeds and his fondness for Radha, then they dance where sage Narada plays music. Such scenes where cowgirls imitate Krishna's life story are also found in Sanskrit poems of Harivamsa and Vishnu Purana, both generally dated to be older than Cilappatikaram. The Tamil epic calls portions of it as vāla caritai nāṭaṅkaḷ, which mirrors the phrase balacarita nataka – dramas about the story of the child [Krishna]" – in the more ancient Sanskrit kavyas. (Note: Similarly, other cantos describe stories of Durga and Shiva found in the Puranas of the Shaivism tradition.) According to the Indologist Friedhelm Hardy, this canto and others in the Tamil epic reflect a culture where "Dravidian, Tamil, Sanskrit, Brahmin, Buddhist, Jain and many other influences" had already fused into a composite whole in the South Indian social consciousness.

According to Zvelebil, the Cilappadikaram is the "first literary expression and the first ripe fruit of the Aryan-Dravidian synthesis in Tamilnadu".

=== Tamil nationalism ===
In early 20th-century, the Cilappadikaram became a rallying basis for some Tamil nationalists based in Sri Lanka and colonial-era Madras Presidency. The epic is considered as the "first consciously national work" and evidence of the fact that the "Tamils had by that time [mid 1st-millennium CE] attained nationhood", or the first expression of a sense of Tamil cultural integrity and Tamil dominance. This view is shared by some modernist Tamil playwrights, movie makers, and politicians. According to Norman Cutler, this theme runs in recent works such as the 1962 re-rendering of the Cilappadikaram into Kannakip Puratcikkappiyam by Paratitacan, and the 1967 play Cilappatikaram: Natakak Kappiyam by M. Karunanidhi – an influential politician and a former Chief Minister behind the Dravida Munnetra Kazhagam and Dravidian movement. These versions, some by avowed atheists, have retold the Cilappadikaram epic "to propagate their ideas of [Tamil] cultural identity", along with a hostility to "the North, the racially different Aryans, the Brahmins", and the so-called "alien culture", according to Prabha Rani and Vaidyanathan Shivkumar.

The Tamil nationalistic inspiration derived from the Cilappadikaram is a selective reading and appropriation of the great epic, according to Cutler. It cherrypicks and brackets some rhetorical and ideological elements from the epic but ignores the rest that make the epic into a complete masterpiece. In the third book of the epic, the Tamil king Cenkuttuvan defeats his fellow Tamil kings and then invades and conquers the Deccan and the north Indian kingdoms. Yet, states Cutler, the same book places an "undeniable prestige" for a "rock from the Himalayas", the "river Ganges" and other symbols from the north to honor Kannaki. Similarly, the Pandyan and the Chera king in various katais, as well as the three key characters of the epic (Kannaki, Kovalan and Madhavi) in other katais of the Cilappadikaram pray in Hindu temples dedicated to Shiva, Murugan, Vishnu, Krishna, Balarama, Indra, Korravai (Parvati), Saraswati, Lakshmi, and others. The Tamil kings are described in the epic as performing Vedic sacrifices and rituals, where Agni and Varuna are invoked, and the Vedas are chanted. These and numerous other details in the epic were neither of Dravidian roots nor icons, rather they reflect an acceptance of and reverence for certain shared pan-Indian cultural rituals, symbols and values, what Himalayas and Ganges signify to the Indic culture. The epic rhetorically does present a vision of a Tamil imperium, yet it also "emphatically is not exclusively Tamil", states Cutler.

According to V R Ramachandra Dikshitar, the epic provides no evidence of sectarian conflict between the Indian religious traditions. In Cilappadikaram, the key characters pray and participate in both Shaiva and Vaishnava rituals, temples and festivals. In addition, they give help and get help from the Jains and the Ajivikas. There are Buddhist references too in the Cilappadikaram such as about Mahabodhi, but these are very few – unlike the other Tamil epic Maṇimēkalai. Yet, all these references are embedded in a cordial community, where all share the same ideas and belief in karma and related premises. The major festivals described in the epic are pan-Indian and these festivals are also found in ancient Sanskrit literature.

== Preservation ==
U. V. Swaminatha Iyer (1855-1942 CE), a Tamil scholar, rediscovered palm-leaf manuscripts of the poem, along with those of the Sangam literature, in Hindu monasteries near Kumbakonam. These manuscripts were preserved and copied in temples and monasteries over the centuries, as palm-leaf manuscripts degrade in the tropical climate. This rediscovery in the second half of the 19th-century and the consequent publication brought Cilappatikaram to readers and scholars outside the temples. This helped trigger an interest in ancient Tamil literature. Aiyar published its first partial edition in 1872, the full edition in 1892. Since then, the epic poem has been translated into many languages.

S Ramanathan (1917-1988 CE) has published articles on the musical aspects of the Silappadikaram.

== Reception ==
To some critics, Maṇimēkalai is more interesting than Cilappadikaram, but in terms of literary evaluation, it seems inferior. According to Panicker, there are effusions in Cilappadikaram in the form of a song or a dance, which does not go well with western audience as they are assessed to be inspired on the spur of the moment. According to a Calcutta review, the three-epic works on a whole have no plot and no characterization to qualify for an epic genre.

A review by George L. Hart, a professor of Tamil language at the University of California, Berkeley, "the Silappatikaram is to Tamil what the Iliad and Odyssey are to Greek — its importance would be difficult to overstate."

== Translations ==
The first English translation of Cilappadikaram was published in 1939 by V R Ramachandra Dikshitar (Oxford University Press). In 1965, an English translation of the epic was published by Alain Daniélou. R. Parthasarathy's English translation was published in 1993 by Columbia University Press and reprinted in 2004 by Penguin Books. Paula Saffire of Butler University state that Parthasarathy's translation is "indispensable" and more suited for scholarly studies due to its accuracy, while Daniélou's translation was more suited to those seeking the epic's spirit and an easier to enjoy poem.

The Parthasarathy translation won the 1996 A.K. Ramanujan Book Prize for Translation.

The epic has been translated into French by the same Alain Daniélou and RN Desikan in 1961 (before his English translation), into Czech by Kamil Zvelebil in 1965, and into Russian by JJ Glazov in 1966.

=== Rewritings ===
Veteran Tamil writer Jeyamohan rewrote the whole epic into a novel as Kotravai in 2005. The novel having adapted the original plot and characters, it revolves around the ancient South Indian traditions, also trying to fill the gaps in the history using multiple narratives. H. S. Shivaprakash a leading poet and playwright in Kannada has also re-narrated a part from the epic namely Madurekanda. It has also been re-narrated in Hindi by famous Hindi writer Amritlal Nagar in his novel Suhag Ke Nupur which was published in 1960. He had also written a 1.25-hour radio-play on the story which was broadcast on Aakashvani in 1952.

== In popular culture ==
There have been multiple movies based on the story of Cilappathikaram and the most famous is the portrayal of Kannagi by actress Kannamba in the 1942 movie Kannagi. P. U. Chinnappa played the lead as Kovalan. The movie faithfully follows the story of Cilappathikaram and was a hit when it was released. The movie Poompuhar, penned by M. Karunanidhi is also based on Cilapathikaram. There are multiple dance dramas as well by some of the great exponents of Bharatanatyam in Tamil as most of the verses of Cilappathikaram can be set to music.

Cilappatikaram also occupies much of the screen time in the 15th and 16th episodes of the television series Bharat Ek Khoj. Pallavi Joshi played the role of Kannagi and Rakesh Dhar played that of Kovalan.

- Poompuhar (film)
- Paththini (2016 film) in Sinhala - Sri Lanka
- Kodungallooramma film in Malayalam (1968)
- Upasana - Television Series in Hindi (1996) (doordarshan)
- Aalayam - Television Series in Tamil (1996) (dubbed version of Upasana)

Indian Railways launched a new train named after the poem, the Silambu Express, between Chennai and Manamadurai in 2013.

== See also ==
- Five Great Epics
