= List of people associated with Mayiladuthurai district =

The following people were born or based their life in the Mayiladuthurai district in Tamil Nadu, India.

== Academics ==
- M. S. Udayamurthy – A Tamil writer and social activist.
- K. S. Venkataramani - An Indian novelist and short-story writer.
- S.R. Renganathan – An Indian librarian and mathematician. He is considered to be the father of library science, documentation, and information science in India.
- Sa. Kandasamy – A novelist and documentary film-maker.
- T. R. Venkatarama Sastri – An Indian lawyer and politician who served as the Advocate-General for Madras Presidency
- Raghavan Seetharaman – former CEO of Doha Bank, Qatar.

== Film artists and musicians ==
- M. K. Thyagaraja Bhagavathar – An Indian actor and Carnatic singer. Critics and film historians acknowledge Bhagavathar as the "First superstar of Tamil cinema.
- Padma Shri Sirkazhi Govindarajan – A Carnatic vocalist and a playback singer of Indian cinema, predominantly in Tamil cinema.
- S. S. Mani Bhagavathar - An Indian Carnatic music singer, cine actor and a playback singer in Tamil language films.
- Nadaswaram Vidwan T.N. Rajarathinam – An Indian Carnatic musician, nadaswaram maestro, vocalist and film actor. He was popularly known as "Nadaswara Chakravarthi" (literally, the Emperor of Nadaswaram).
- Kumari Kamala - an Indian dancer and actress, appeared in almost 100 Tamil, Hindi, Telugu and Kannada films.
- G. N. Balasubramaniam – An Indian Carnatic singer and also a Tamil film actor.
- S. Kalyanaraman – A vocalist in the Carnatic tradition.
- T. Rajendar – An Indian actor, film director, film producer, musician, cinematographer, film distributor and politician.
- P. Krishnamoorthy – An Indian film art director, production designer and costume designer.
- S. R. D. Vaidyanathan – An Indian musician who played the Nadaswaram.
- R. D. Rajasekhar – an Indian cinematographer who predominantly works in films of Indian languages such as Tamil, Malayalam, Telugu, and Hindi.
- T. V. Sankaranarayanan - A Carnatic vocalist and a South Indian classical playback singer.

== Religious and spiritual poets ==
- Sambandar - a Shaiva poet-saint of Tamil Nadu who lived in the 7th century CE. He is revered as one of the Nalvar ("group of four" in Tamil), a set of four foremost Nayanars Tamil saints alongside Appar, Sambandarm and Manikkavacakar.
- Iyarpagai Nayanar - a Nayanar saint and counted as the third in the list of 63 Nayanars.
- Thirumangai Alvar - the last of the 12 Alvar saints of south India, who are known for their affiliation with the Vaishnava tradition of Hinduism.
- Sirappuli Nayanar - a Nayanar saint, venerated in the Hindu sect of Shaivism, counted as the thirty-fifth in the list of 63 Nayanars.
- Kambar – A poet and the author of Ramayana in Tamil Language known as Kambaramayanam.
- Manakanchara Nayanar – a Nayanar saint, counted as the twelfth in the list of 63 Nayanars.
- Abhirami Pattar - A Hindu saint, famed as the author of a collection of hymns called Abhirami Anthadhi.
- Muthu Thandavar - A composer of Carnatic music. He composed several kritis and padams, short songs mainly sung accompanying Bharatanatyam performances.
- Arunachala Kavi - A Tamil poet and a composer of Carnatic music. He composed the opera Rama Natakam.
- Marimutha Pillai - A composer of Carnatic music and was a contemporary of Arunachala Kavi.
- Mayuram Vedhanaygam Pillai – An Indian civil servant, Tamil poet, novelist and social worker who is remembered for the authorship of Prathapa Mudaliar Charithram (1879), recognized as the "first modern Tamil novel"
- Kundrakudi Adigal - a Saivite ascetic, Tamil orator, and writer, has written many books about Saivism and Tamil Literature.
- Kalki Krishnamoorthy – An Indian writer, journalist, poet, critic and Indian independence activist. Historical novels such as Ponniyin Selvan, Sivagamiyin Sabatham written by Kalki apart from this his writings include over 120 short stories, 10 novellas, 5 novels, 3 historical romances, editorial and political writings and hundreds of film and music reviews.
- Kavignar Meenavan - A Tamil poet, writer, activist, popular scholar and has written lot of poetry and research articles in Tamil language.

== Science ==
- S. Srinivasan - An Indian aeronautical engineer and the Director of the Vikram Sarabhai Space Centre, known for his work in rocket science. He also served as the director of Satish Dhawan Space Centre and assisted A. P. J. Abdul Kalam in the SLV3 Mission as its deputy director.

== Sports ==
- Viswanathan Anand – An Indian chess grandmaster. Anand is a five-time World Chess Champion, a two-time World Rapid Chess Champion, a two-time Chess World Cup Champion, a World Blitz Chess Cup Champion and six-time Chess Oscar Winner. He became the first grandmaster from India in 1988, and he has the eighth-highest peak FIDE rating of all time. He has been awarded with Padma Vibhushan – Second highest civilian award awarded by Government of India in 2008.
- Adhiban Baskaran - is an Indian chess grandmaster who won the World Under-16 Champion in 2008 and the Indian champion in 2009.
- Baranica Elangovan – an Indian pole vaulter, won a bronze medal at 2026 Asian Games.

== Participants in anti-Hindi agitations in Tamil Nadu ==
- Mayiladuthurai Sarangapani - was a student and participant in the anti-Hindi agitations who died by self-immolation during the anti-Hindi agitations in 1965.

== Political leaders ==
- Thillaiyadi Valliammai – A South African Tamil girl who worked with Mahatma Gandhi in her early years when she developed her nonviolent methods in South Africa fighting its apartheid regime.
- R. K. Bharathi Mohan – An Indian politician and former Member of Parliament elected from the from Mayiladuthurai constituency.
- P. Govindasamy Pillai – A revered successful South Indian businessman and philanthropist in Singapore.
- P. V. Rajendran – An Indian politician and former Member of the Legislative Assembly of Tamil Nadu.
- Kudanthai N. Ramalingam – An Indian politician and former Member of Parliament elected from Tamil Nadu.
- S. Ramanathan – An Indian politician who served as the minister of Madras Presidency in the Congress-led government of 1937.
- K. R. Sambandam – An Indian politician and former Member of Parliament elected from the from Nagapattinam.
- N. Kittappa - An Indian politician and former Member of Tamil Nadu legislative assembly from Mayuram constituency

== See also ==
- List of people from Tamil Nadu
