= Music of Tamil Nadu =

Musical traditions of Tamil Nadu, India

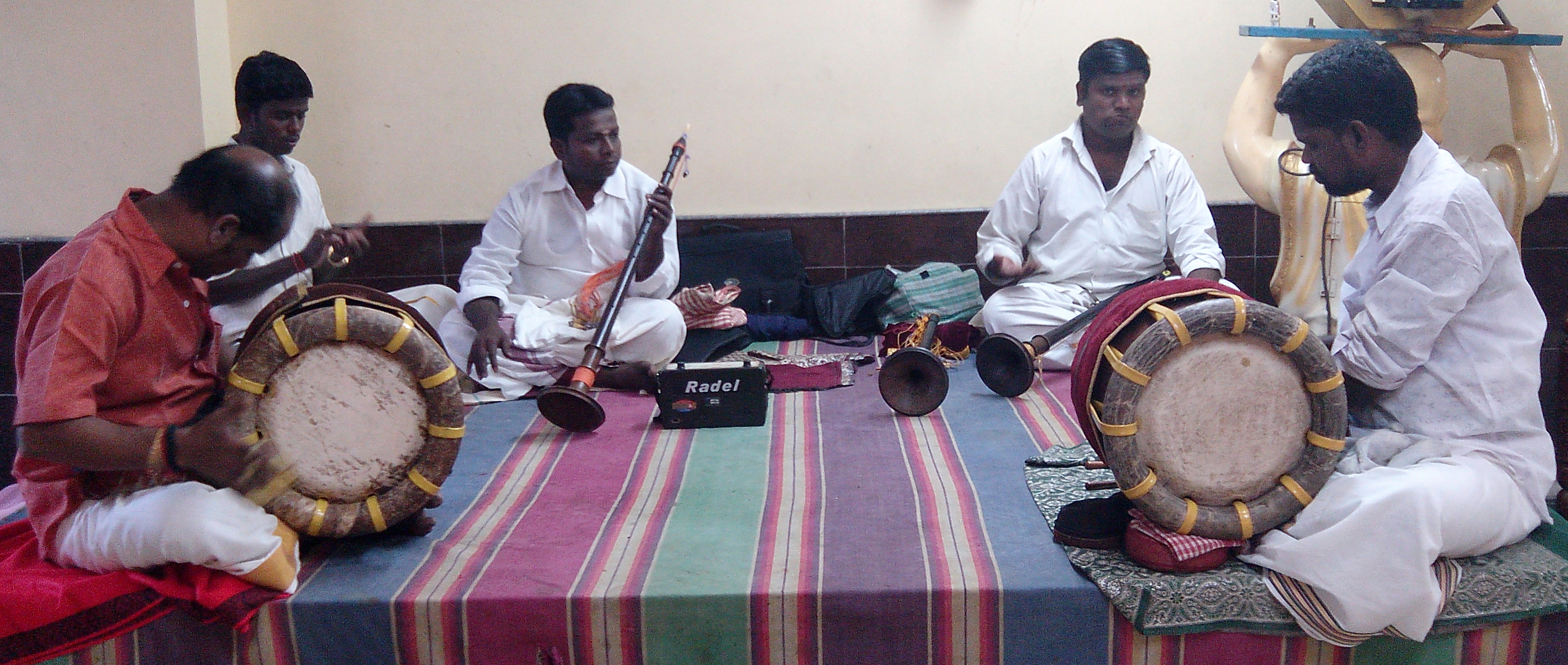
A Tamil musical troup

Music of Tamil Nadu has a long tradition and history going back thousands of years. Music is a very important aspect of marriage, temple ceremonies, and festivals for the Tamil people.

== Ancient music ==
Thiruppugazh - Umbartharu

The tradition of Tamil music goes back to the earliest period of Tamil history. Many poems of the Sangam literature, the classical Tamil literature of the early common era, were set to music. There are various references to this ancient musical tradition found in the ancient Sangam books such as Ettuthokai and Pathupattu. The early narrative poem Silappatikaram, belonging to the post-Sangam period also mentions various forms of music practiced by the Tamil people. Music was also utilised in the compositions of the Tamil Saiva saints such as Appar, Thirugnana Sambanthar and Manikkavasagar during the Hindu revival period between the sixth and the tenth centuries CE. The musical poet (sandakkavi) Arunagirinathar further embellished the Tamil musical tradition through his compositions of Tamil hymns known as Thiruppugazh.

== Pannisai ==
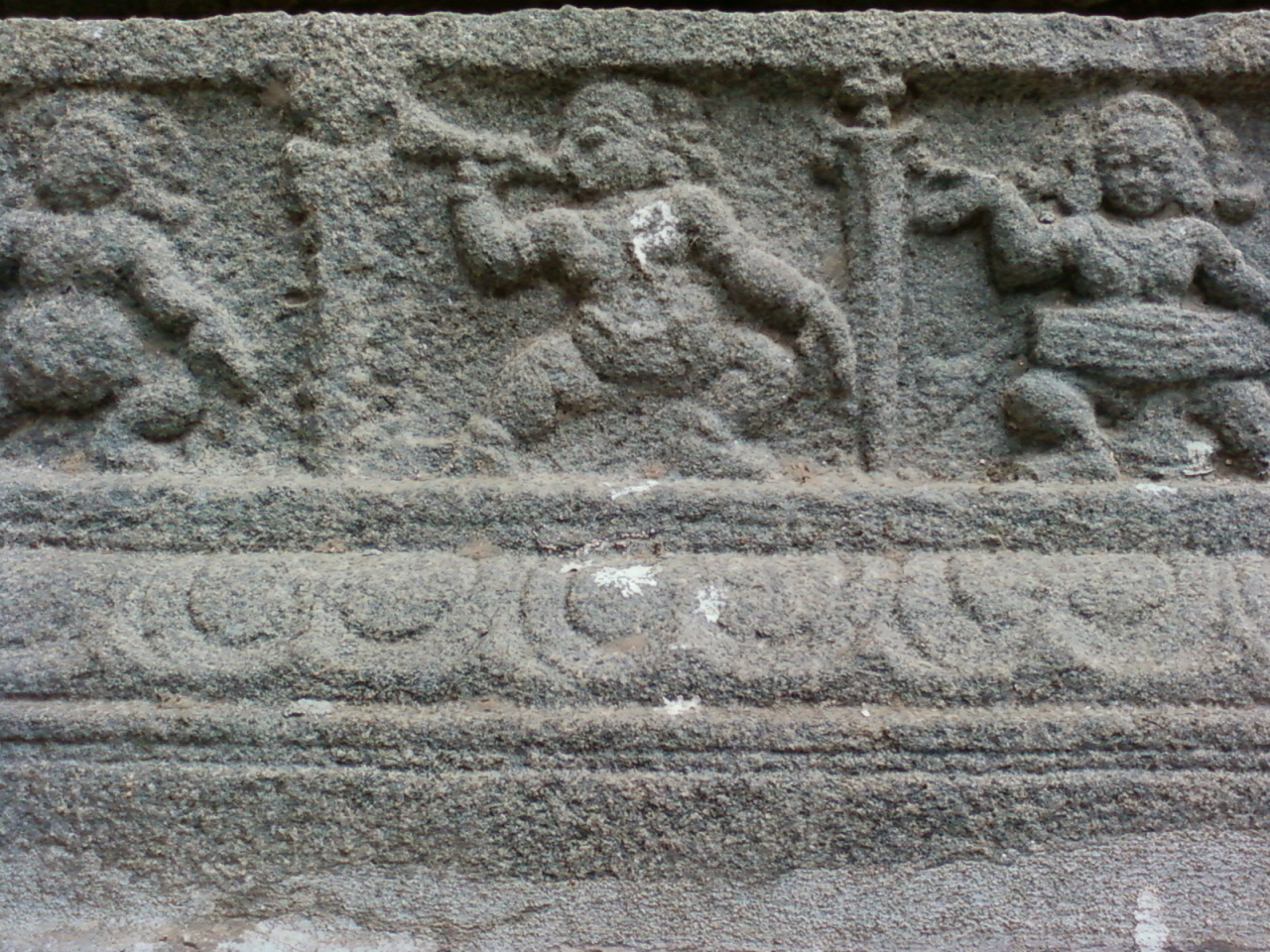
Tiruvannamalai temple sculpture depicting musicians

Pann, which is the classical music form of Southern India, has a long history in Tamil Nadu. Later the name was mistakenly changed as Carnatic music. Even today Pannisai is sung in temple festivals. Tamil Nadu has produced a number of famous performers, as well as a closely related classical dance form Bharatha Natyam. Chennai hosts a large cultural event, the annual Madras Music Season, which includes performances by hundreds of artists.

The musical tradition features 72 primary octave scales (melodic frameworks) alongside complex melodic and rhythmic structures. Considered one of the world's classical music systems, its compositions have historically been transmitted through generations via teacher-disciple lineages.

The composers belonging to the Tamil Trinity of Muthu Thandavar (1560 - 1640 CE), Arunachala Kavi (1712–1779) and Marimutthu Pillai (1717–1787) composed hundreds of devotional songs in Tamil and helped in the evolution of Carnatic music. Three saint composers of the 18th to 19th Century, Tyagaraja, Muthuswami Dikshitar and Shyama Shastri, have composed thousands of songs that remain favourites among musicians and audiences. Today, Tamil Nadu has hundreds of notable carnatic singers who spread this music all over the world. M. S. Subbulakshmi, a renowned carnatic singer, had the honour of singing a song in the UN Security Council.

== Folk music ==
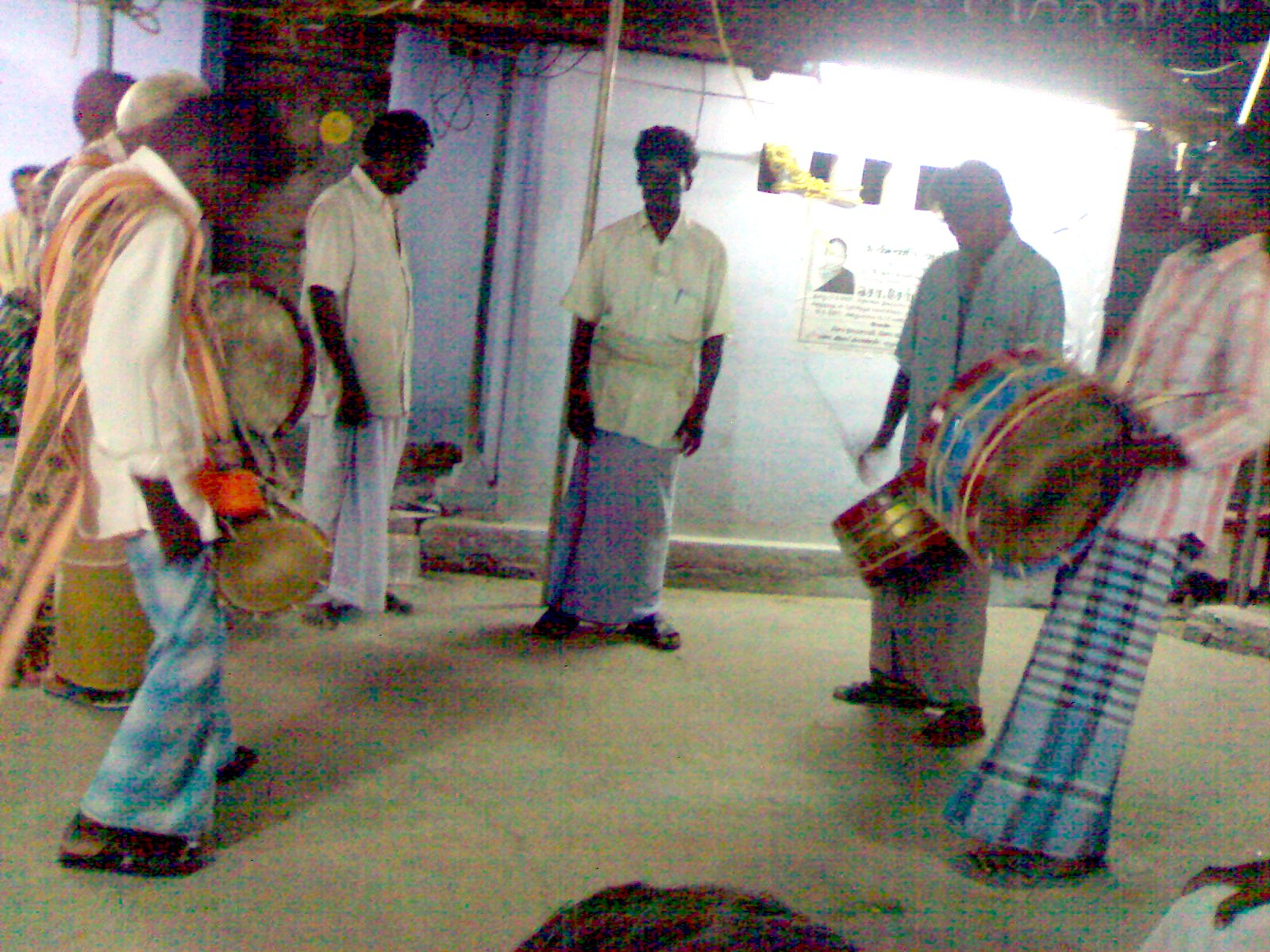
Tamil folk artists

Folk singing remains popular, especially in rural areas; elements of the traditional styles are sometimes used in film music. There are contemporary enthusiasts, like Vijayalakshmi Navaneethakrishnan and Pushpavanam Kuppuswamy, who have worked to revive popular interest in the folk music of Tamil Nadu. The urumi melam also remains as one of the more popular forms of folk music in rural Tamil Nadu and the ensemble is most often played with an urumee and the nadaswaram as the instrument of choice.

The rural hill tribes of Tamil Nadu each have their own folk traditions. The Pulayar, for example, perform melodies called talams which are said to come from the cooing of birds. Each talam is named after a deity, including Kunhanada talam, Mangalanada talam and Karaganachi talam.

A Tamil folk ritual song recorded at Salem Mettur

A Tamil wedding Song

== Gaana ==
Gaana is a rap-like "collection of rhythms, beats and sensibilities native to the Dalits of Chennai." It evolved over the past two centuries, combining influences from the siddhars (tantric adepts) of ancient Tamilakam, Tamil Sufi saints, and more. Gaana songs are performed at weddings, stage shows, political rallies, and funerals. Performers sing about a wide range of topics, but the essence of gaana is said to be "angst and melancholy" based in life's struggles. In the past few decades, the genre has entered the music of the mainstream Tamil film industry and gained popularity. Contemporary gaana bands like The Casteless Collective are bringing the genre to new audiences while using it for social activism, especially against caste discrimination.

== Film music ==
Tamil cinema is well known for its talented composers. The two most famous and acclaimed film composers of India, Ilaiyaraaja and A. R. Rahman are from Tamil Nadu, and predominantly work in the Tamil Film Industry, otherwise known as Kollywood. Other prominent Tamil film score and soundtrack composers in the industry include Harris Jayaraj, Yuvan Shankar Raja, Vidyasagar, D. Imman, Deva, S. A. Rajkumar, Sirpy, Bharadwaj, G. V. Prakash Kumar, Anirudh Ravichander, Santhosh Narayanan and Hiphop Tamizha. During the 1960s and 1970s, prominent film composers K. V. Mahadevan, M. S. Viswanathan and others were popular.

The film music of Tamil Nadu is widely known for its innovation and eclecticism. Scores may showcase blends of Carnatic, Western and other instruments, with a range of melodic and rhythmic patterns. Orchestral themes and minimalist songs often feature. Recent trends show the prevalence of synthesizers and other electronic instruments.

== Instruments ==
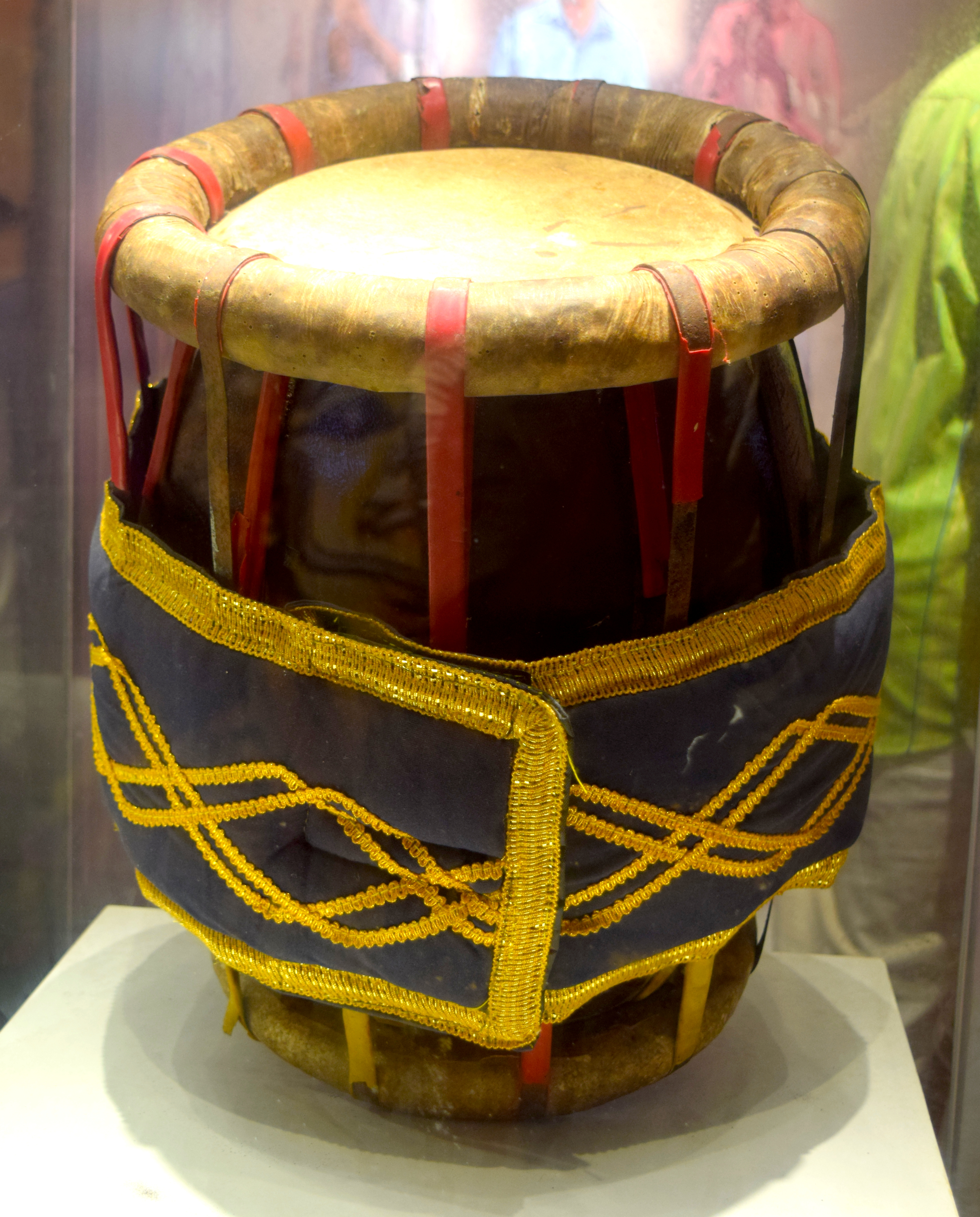
Thavil

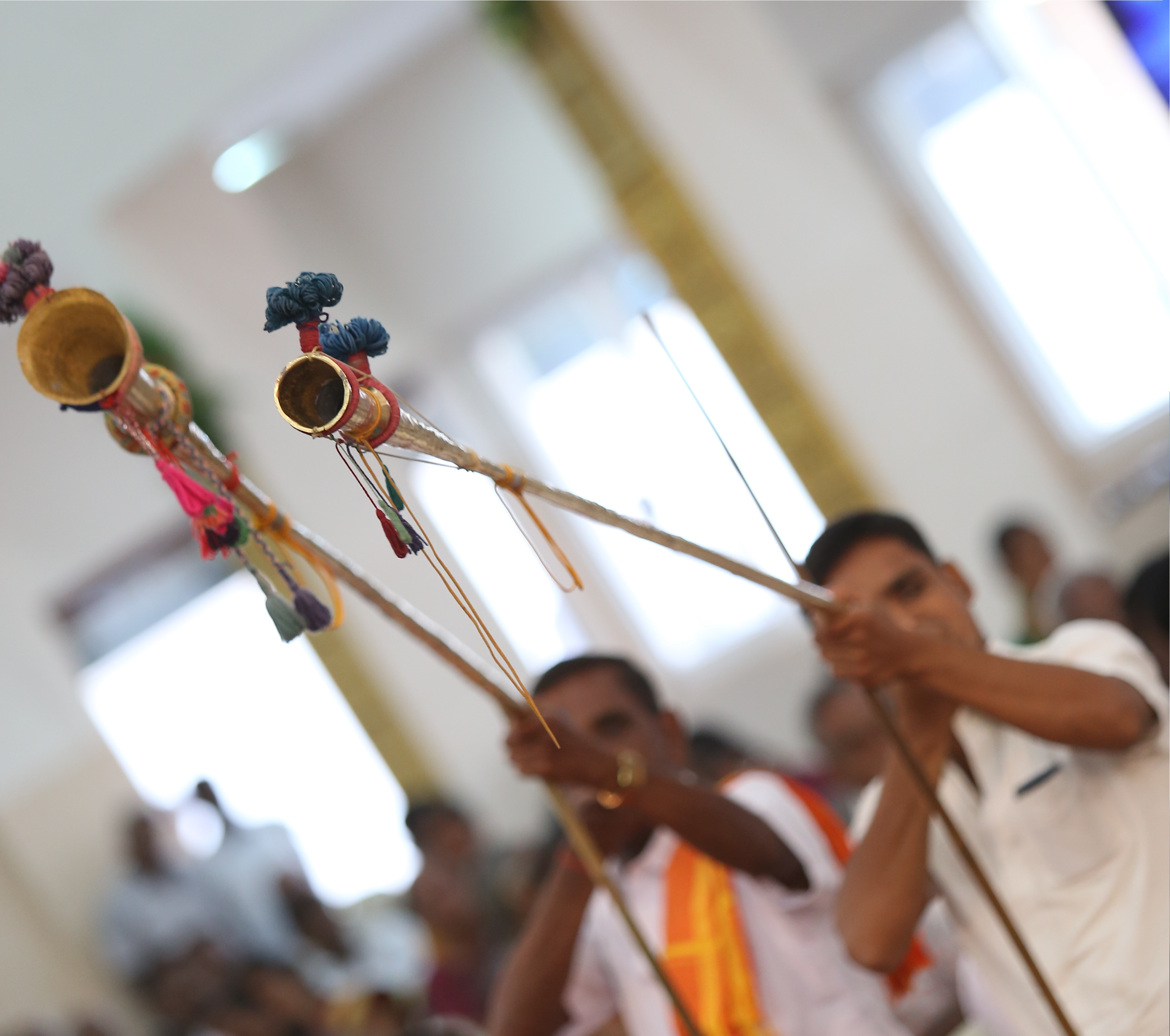
Nedunthaarai

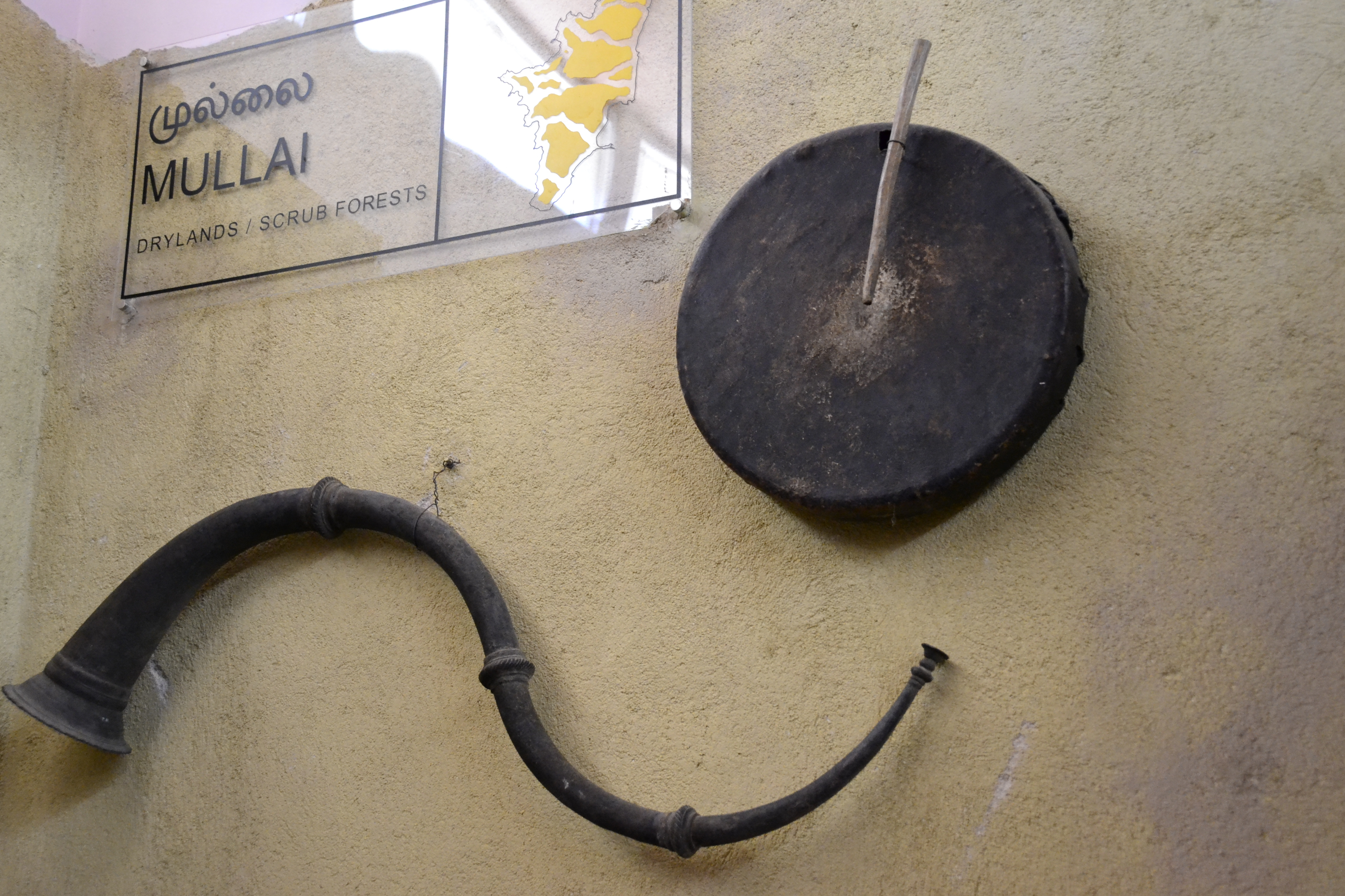
Tharai and Parai

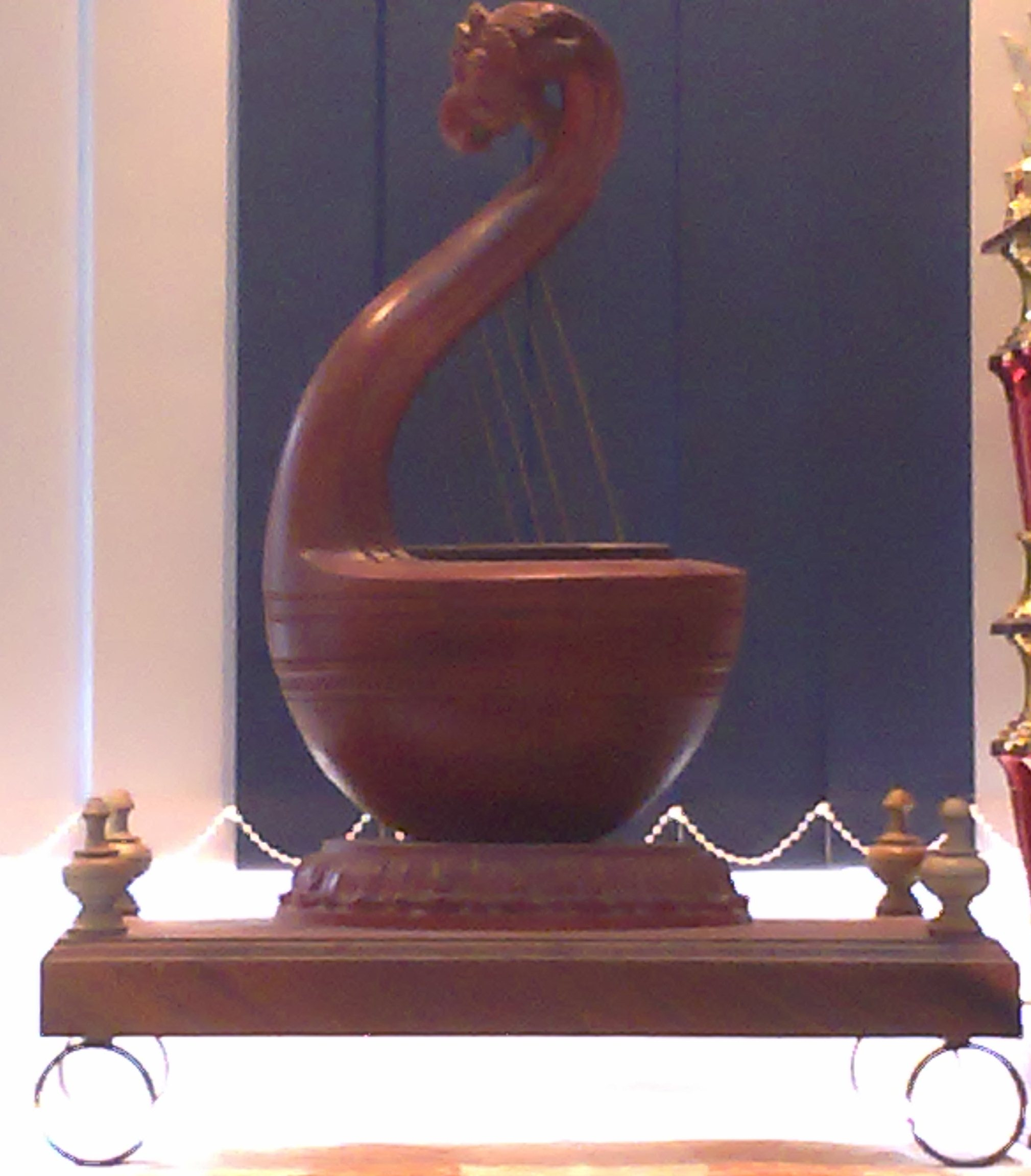
Yazh

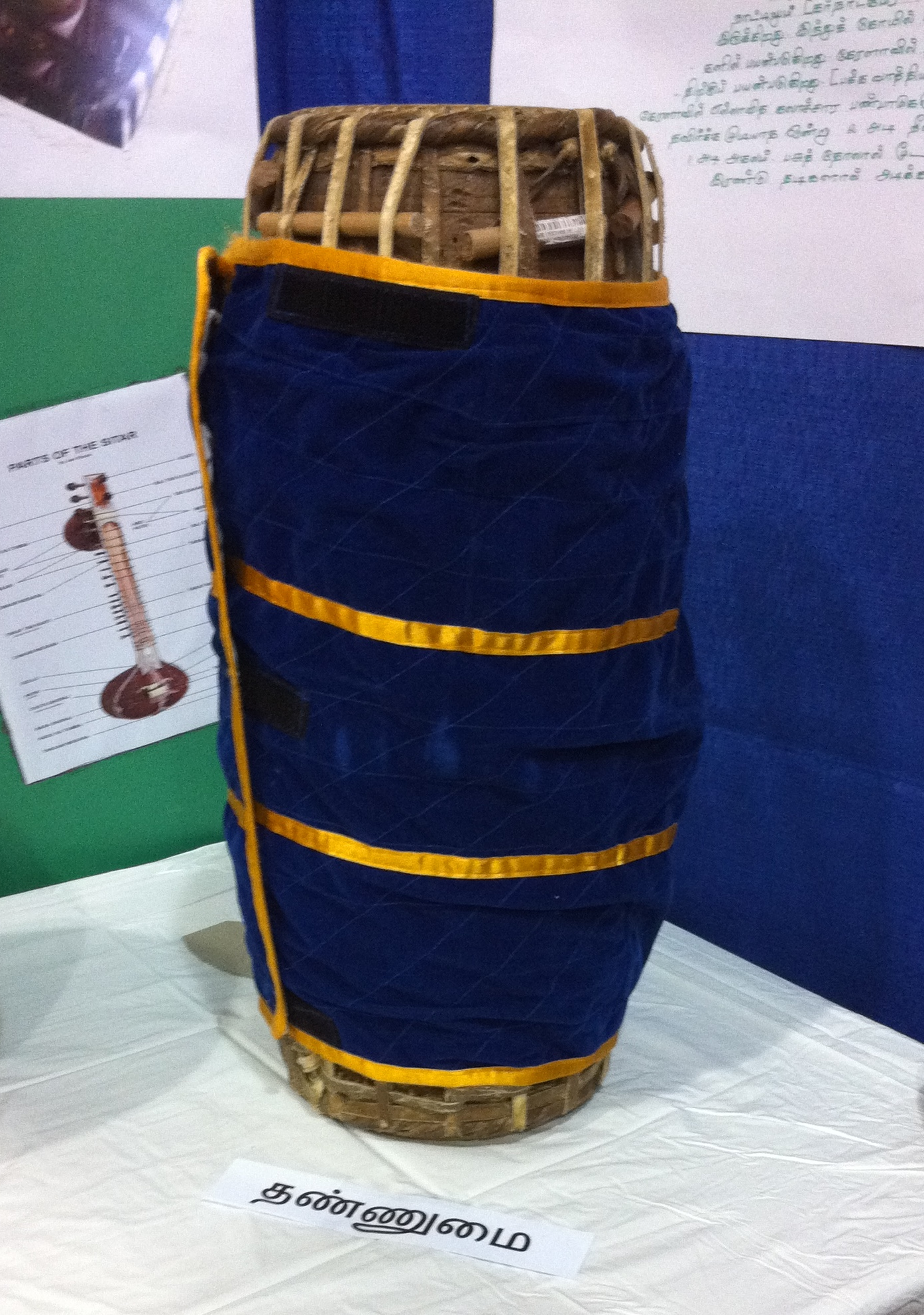
Thannumai

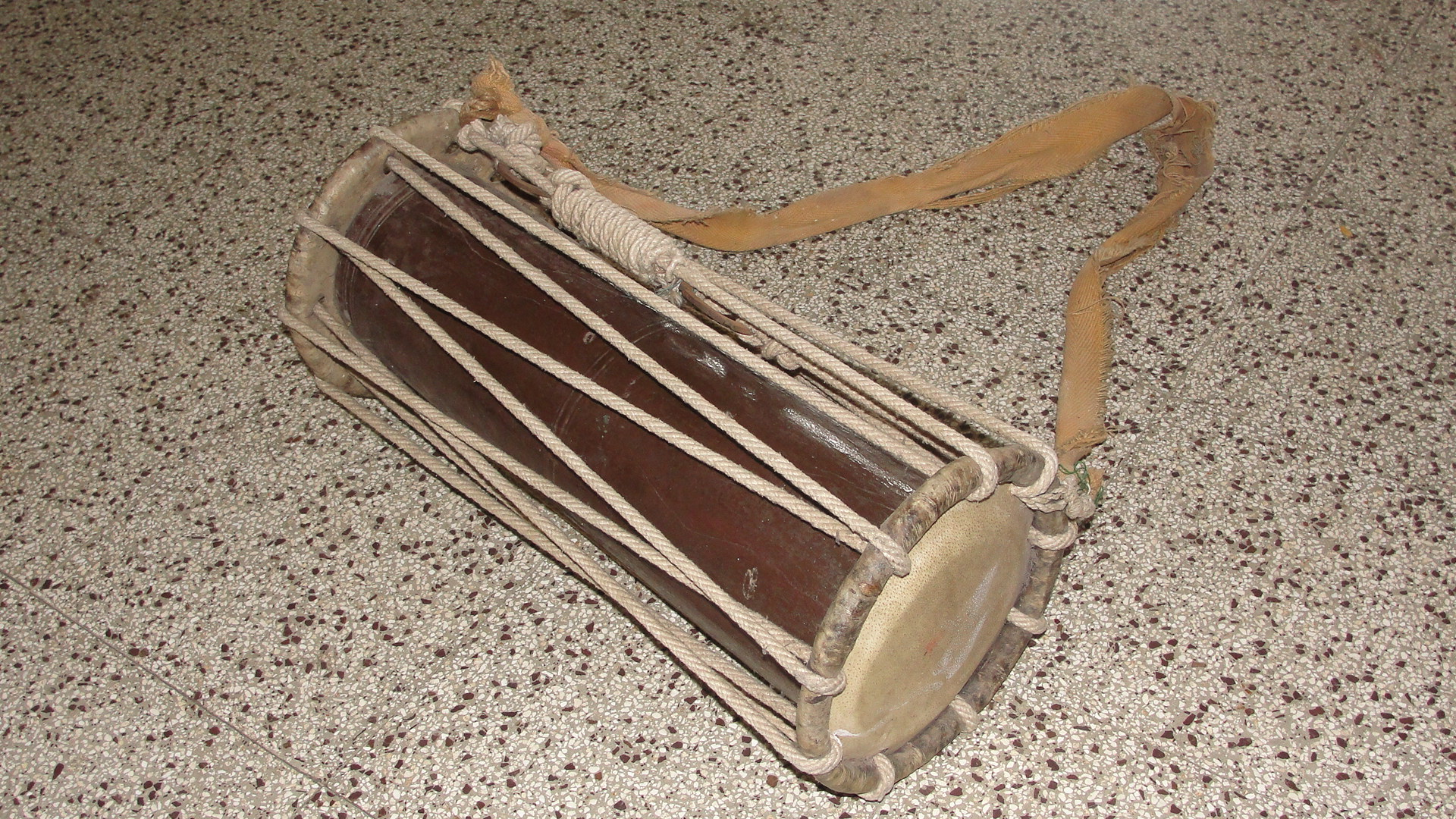
Pambai

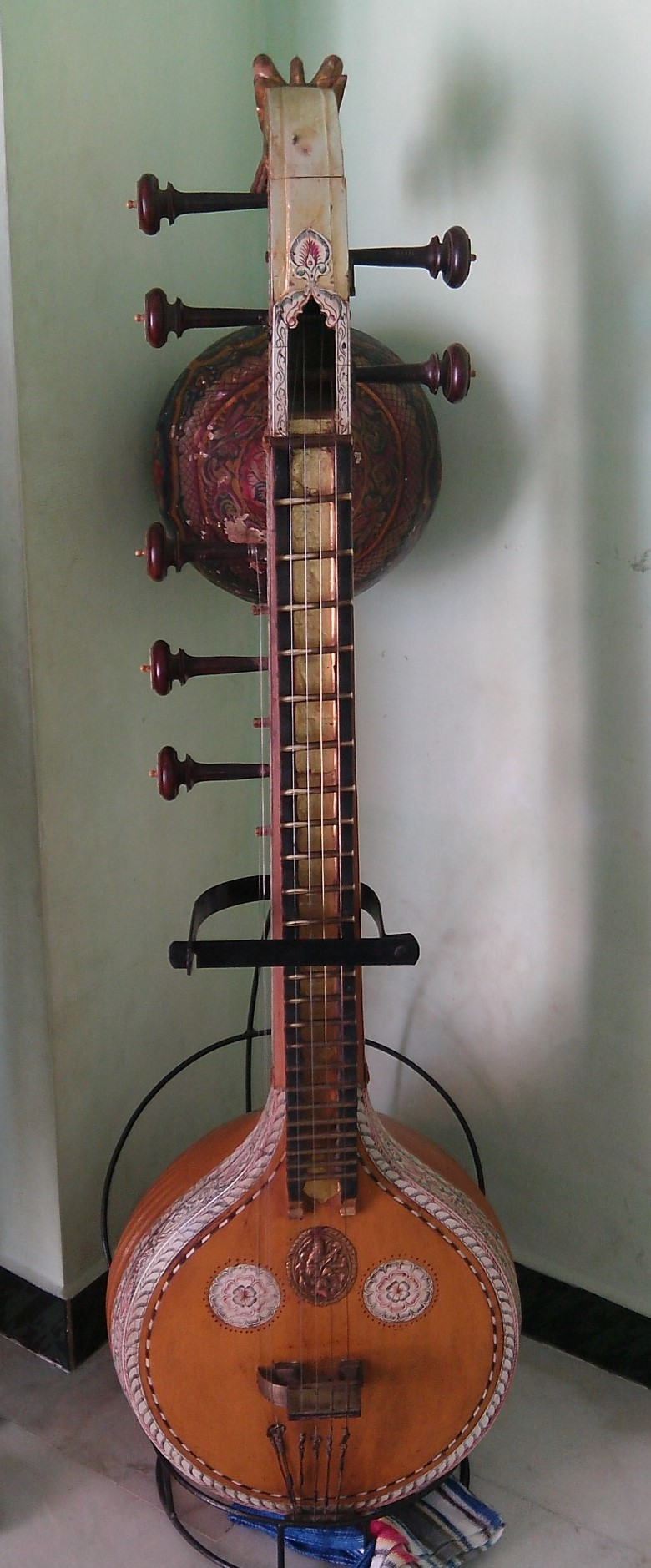
Veena

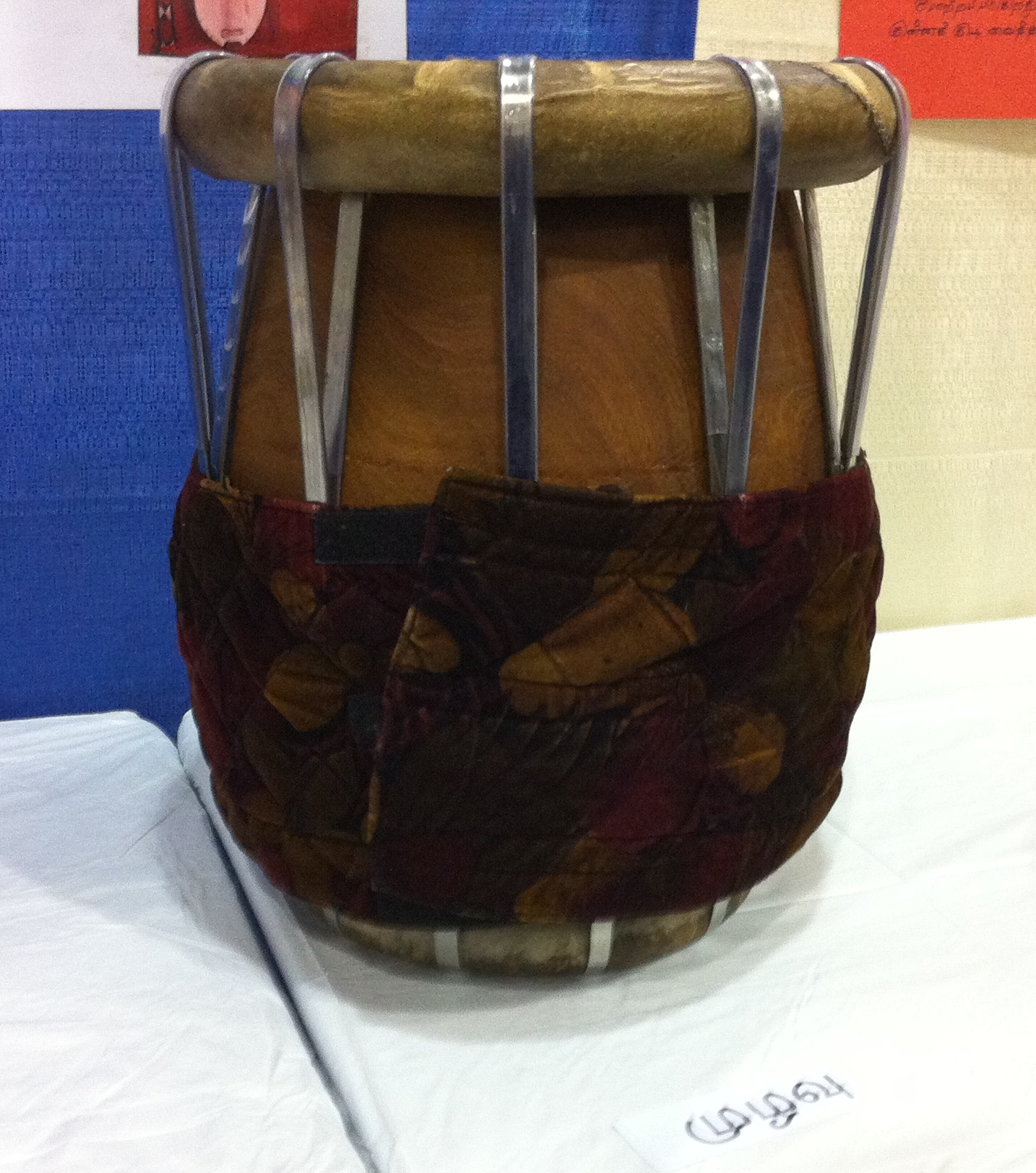
Muzhavu

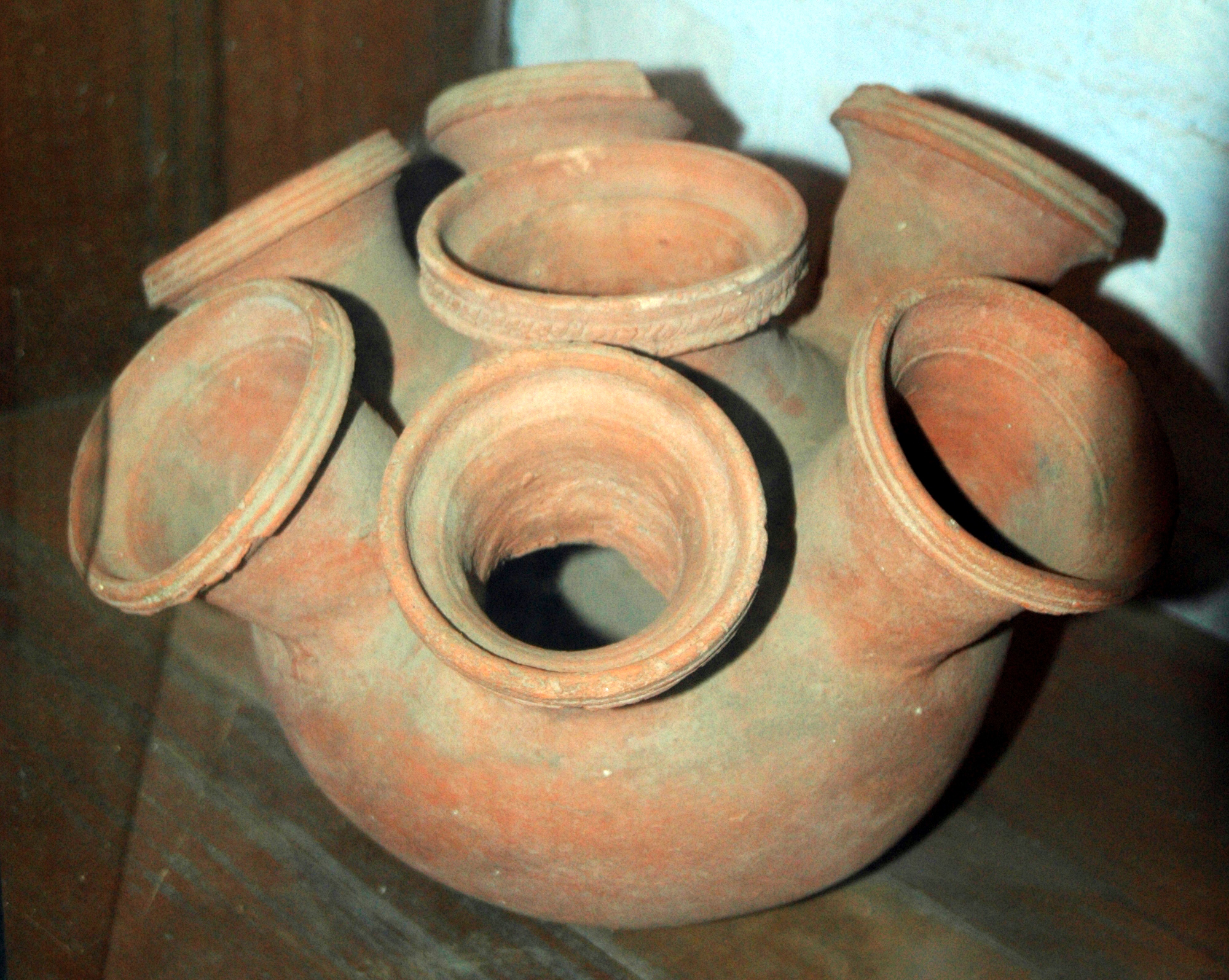
7 mouthed pot

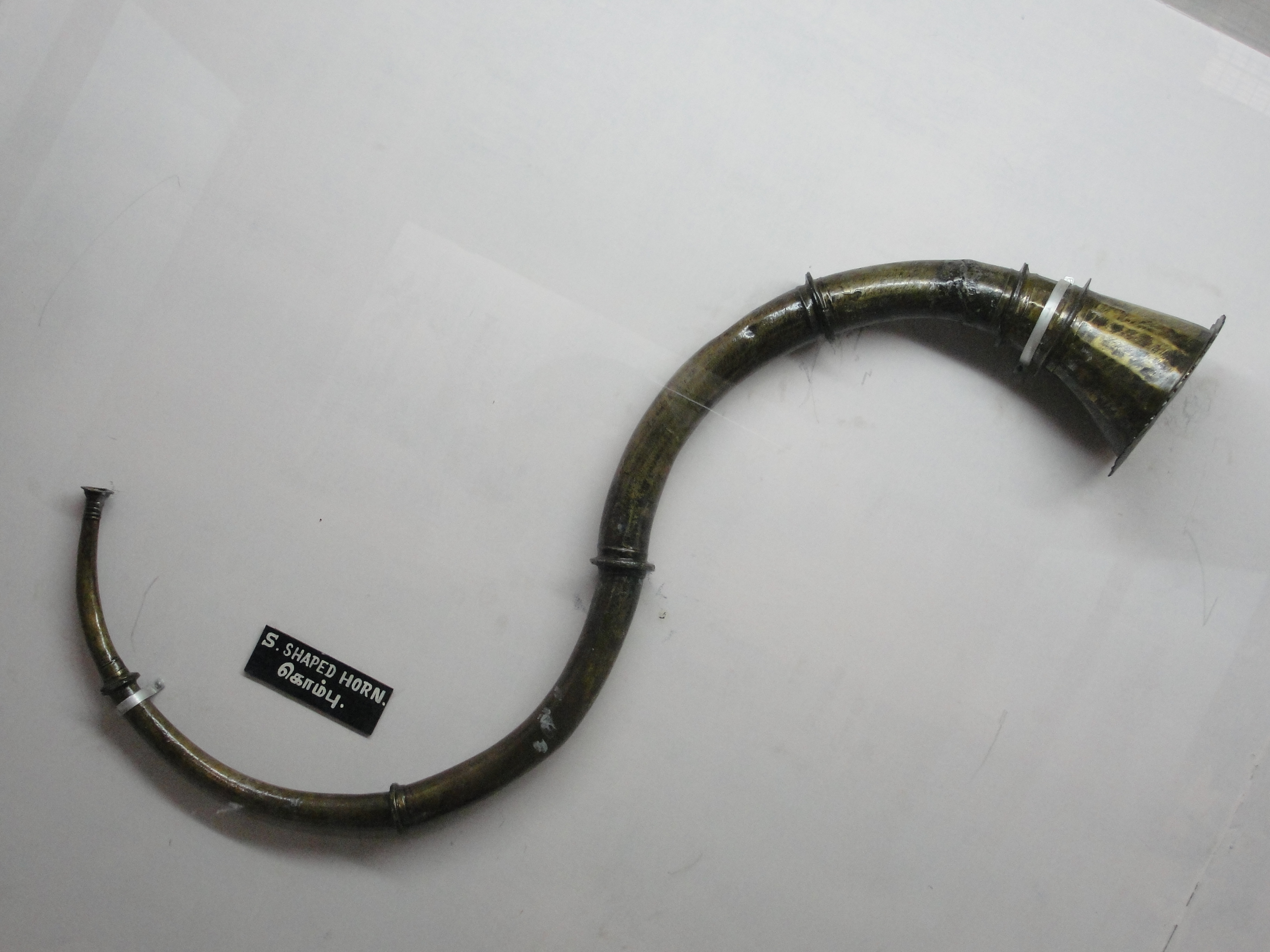
Kombu

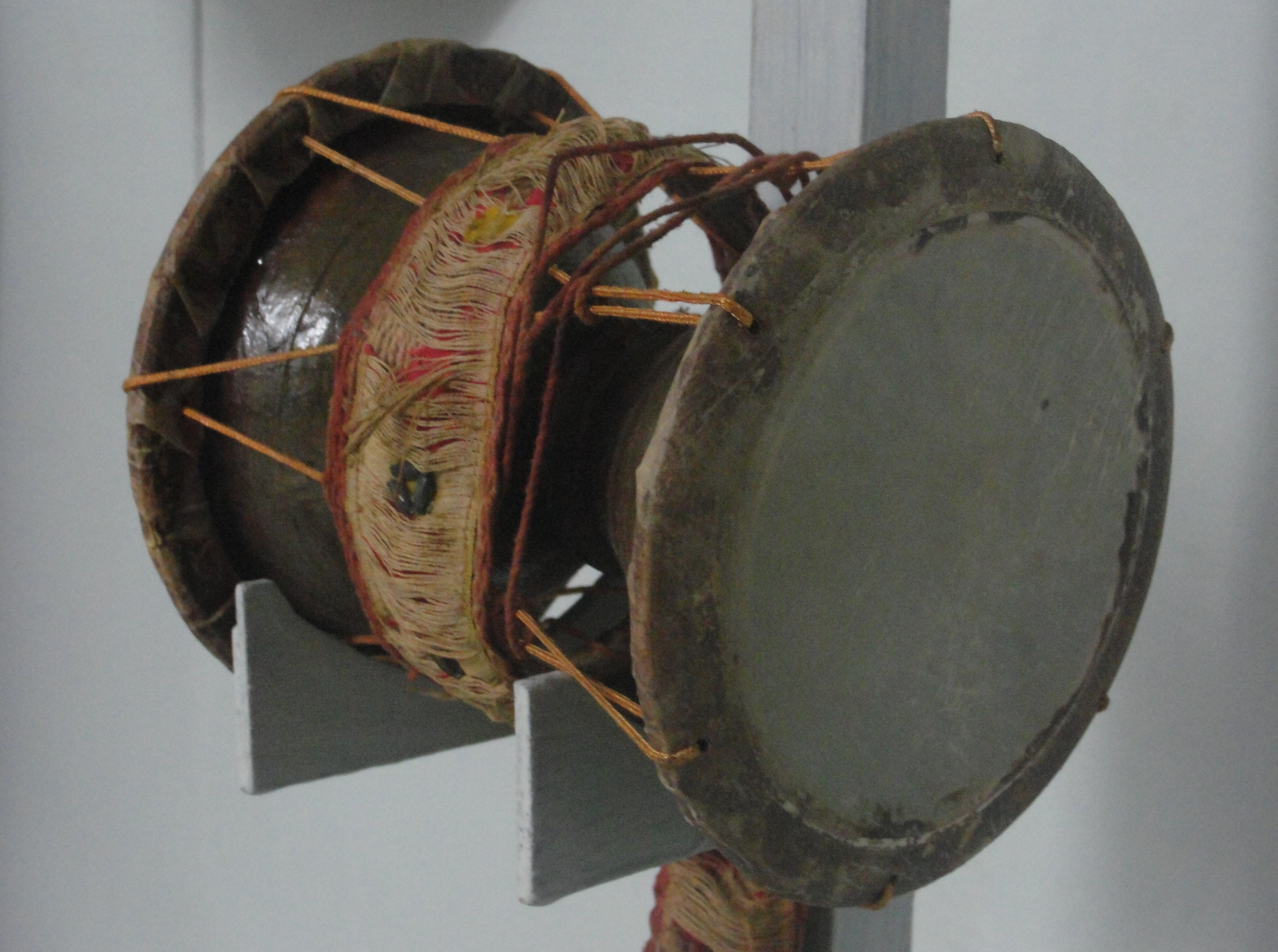
Udukkai

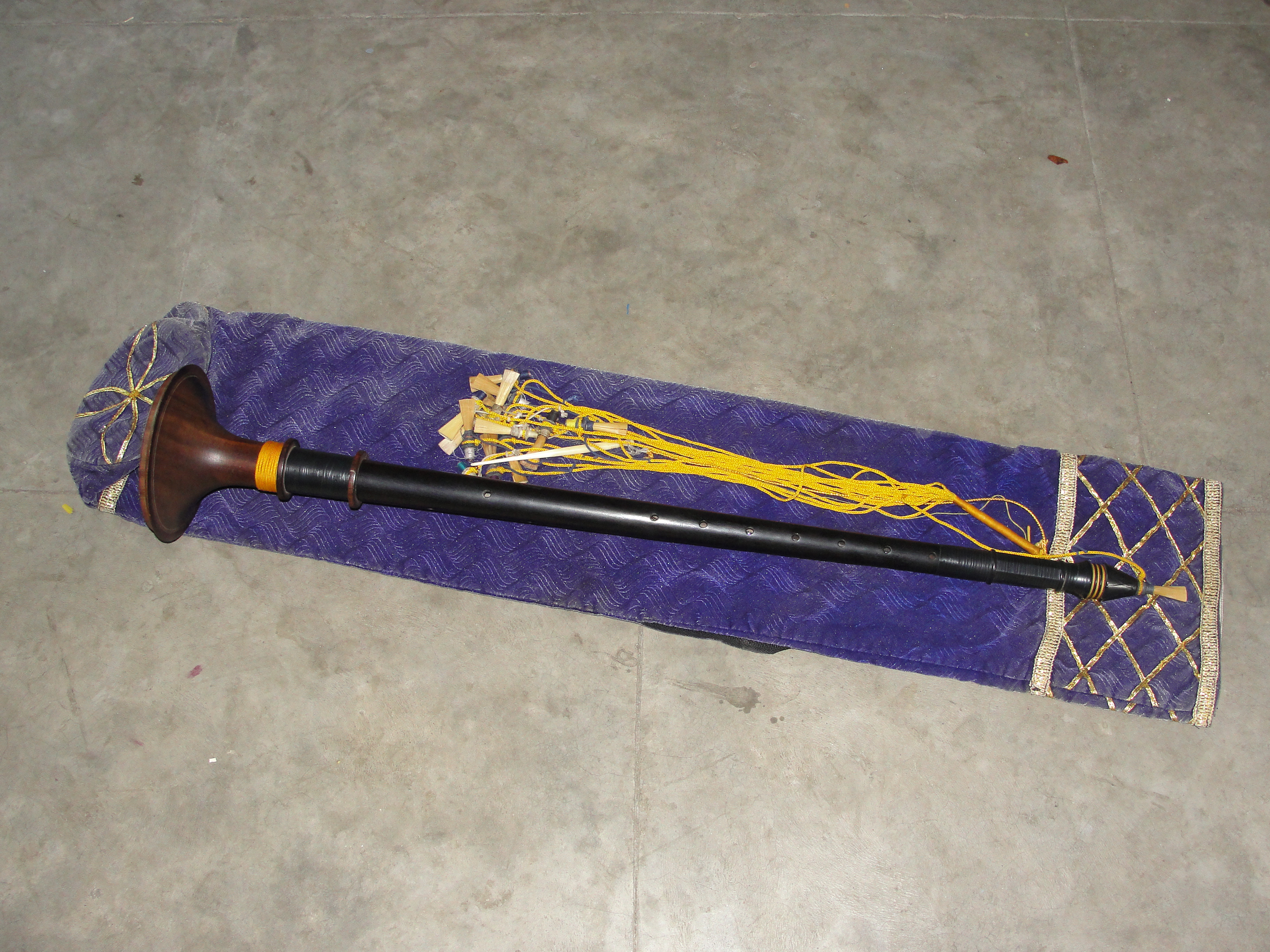
Nadaswaram

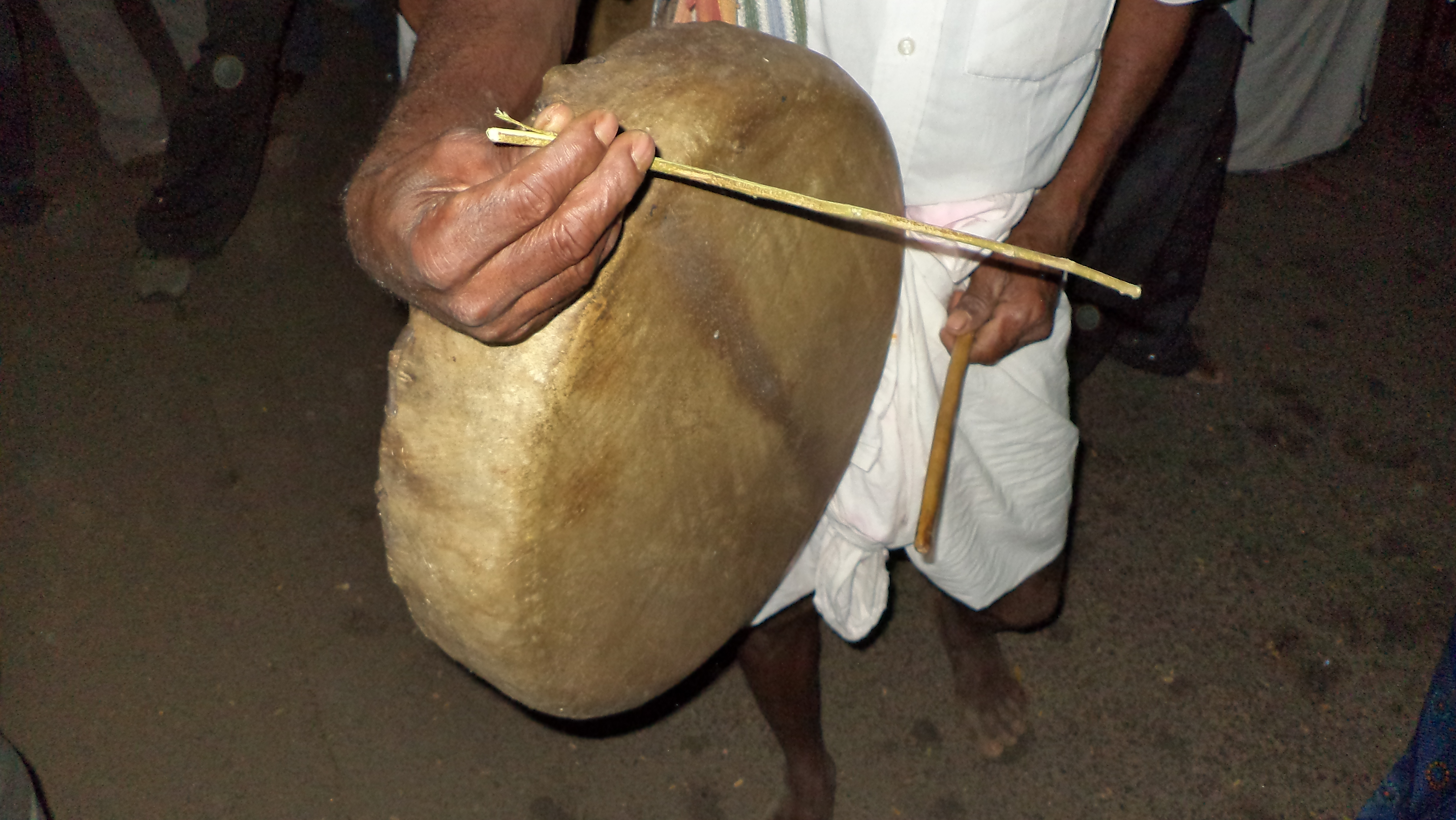
Thappatai

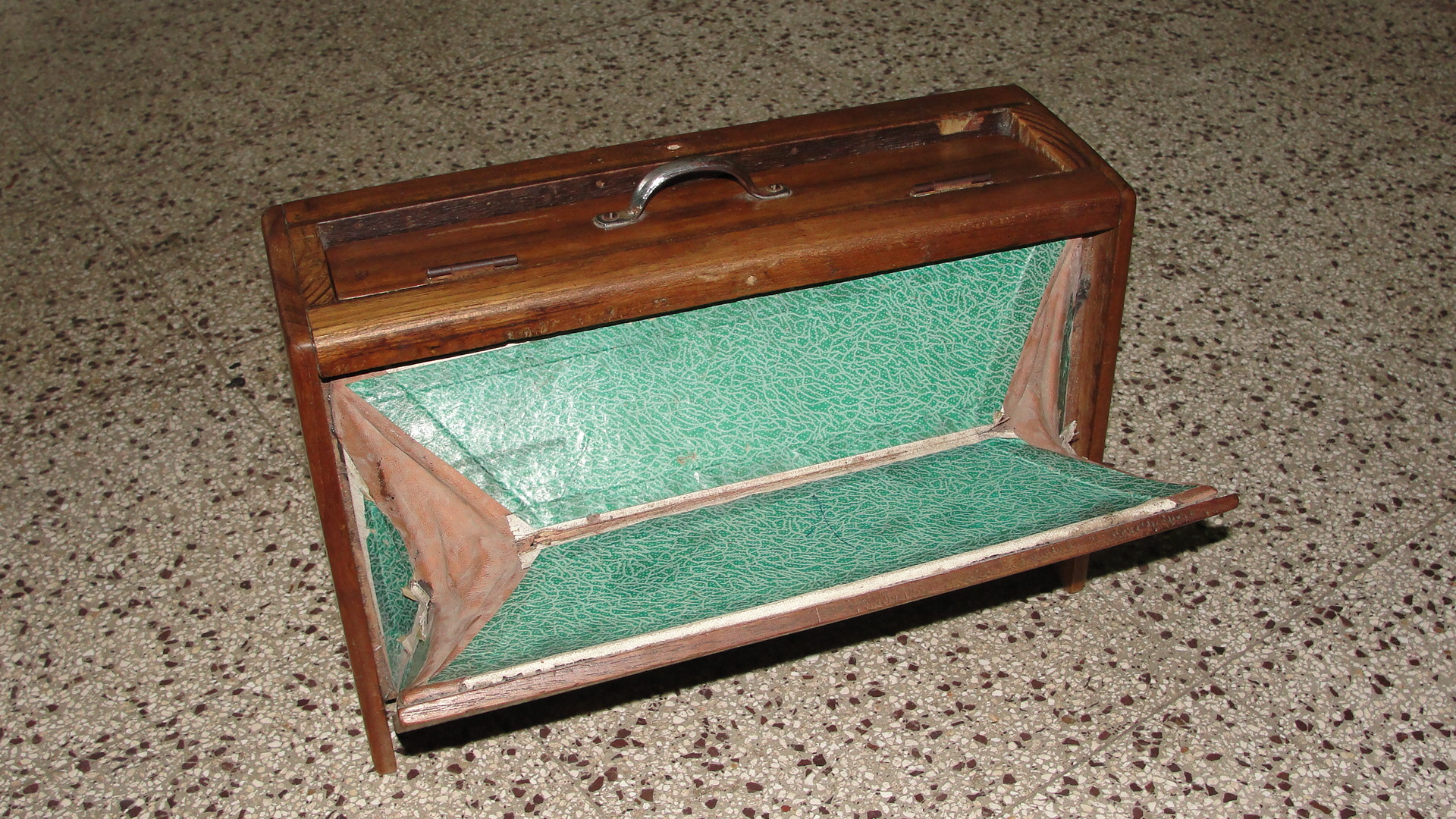
Shruti box
