= Rama Natakam =

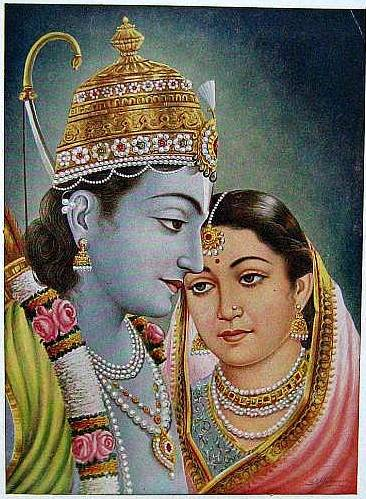
- Rāma and Sita together.

Information
- Religion: Hinduism
- Author: Arunachala Kavi
- Language: Tamil
- Period: 18th Century AD
- Chapters: 6 Kandas, 192 Songs

The Rama Natakam is a Tamil Opera that was written by the Tamil poet Arunachala Kavi also known as Arunachala Kavirayar during the 18th century. Based on Kambar's and Valmiki's Ramayana (which is in Tamil and Sanskrit), the opera describes the legend of King Rama of Ayodhya. The Rama Natakam is even more similar to the Tamil version than the Sanskrit version in many aspects – both in spiritual concepts and in the specifics of the storyline. Several songs of this opera are well known and sung all over Tamil Nadu. Arunachala Kavirayar studied Sanskrit and Tamil in the Dharmapuram Adheenam and excelled in his studies . After his marriage he set up a pawn-broker shop, This not only provided him with a good living, but also with a fair amount of Leisure to pursue his literary studies. Just as he was good at “estimating the fineness of the precious metal, he was equally proficient at estimating the worth of the literary works.” Two books were most liked by Kavirayar — The Tirukkural of Tiruvalluvar and the Ramavataram of Kambar, While the former was only a book of ethics, the latter gave the same in the form of a story which would be more appealing to the common man.

== Legend of Composition ==
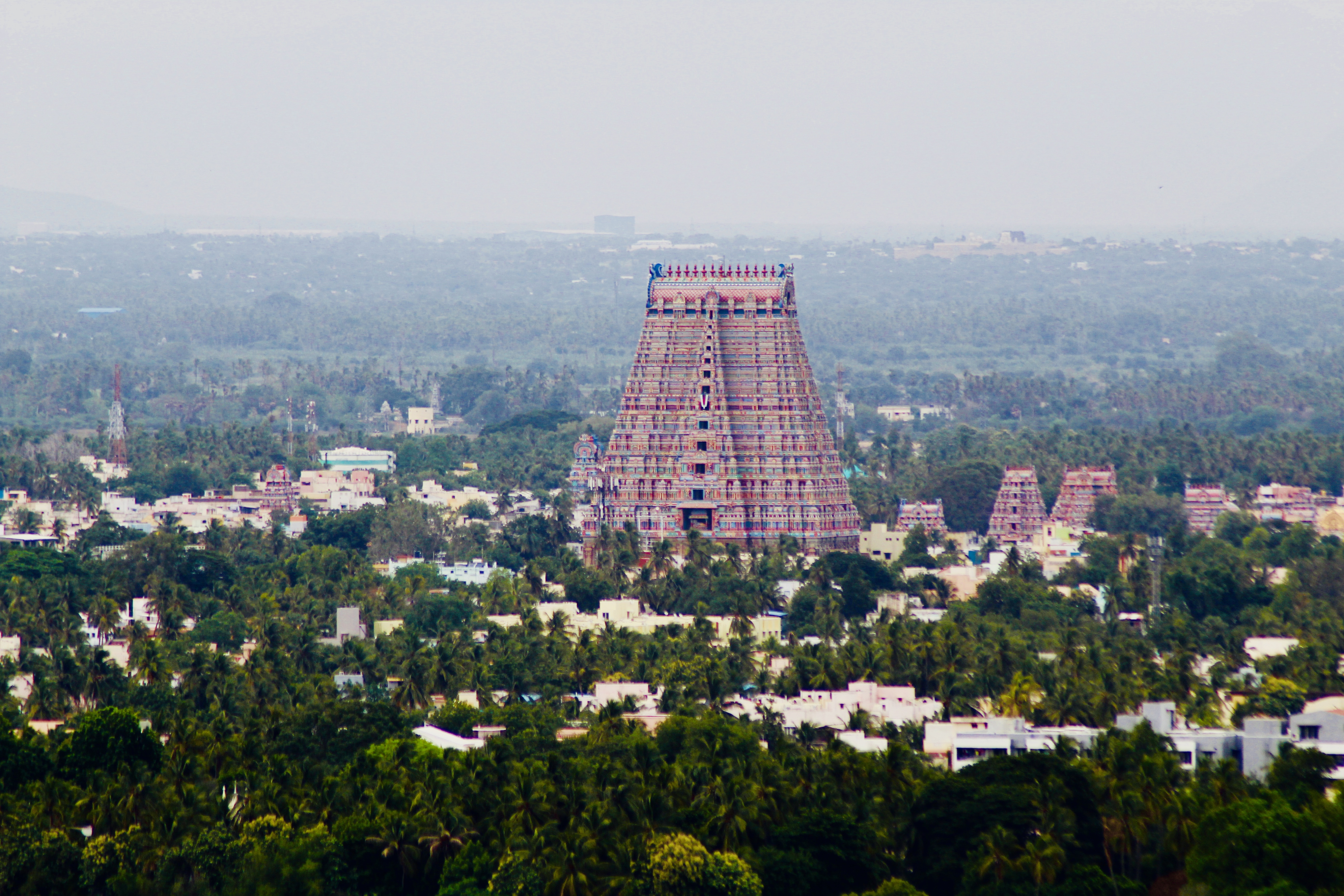
The Opera Rama Natakam was written within the premise of the Srirangam Ranganathaswamy temple.

Arunachala Kavi was fascinated by the epic Ramayana so much that he wanted to impart the story and the good lessons preached by it to a large number of persons who could not obviously read the entire epic in original. He gave a number of discourses on the epic. Arunachala kavi wanted his work also to be officially noted and released in the premises of Srirangam Ranganathaswamy temple as the shrine had some association with the actual story of Ramayana. He marched towards Srirangam and requested permission from the temple authorities. The Temple authorities accepted the request and Arunachala sat in a part of the temple and composed a very beautiful song named as “En Pallikondeeraiyaa” (O Lord! why did you stop and sleep here?) in Kedaragowla, set to Adi tala.

That night both the poet and the temple Priests had separate visions of Lord Ranganatha. The poet was asked to sing about the Parivaara Devatas and the priest was asked to accept Arangetram after such songs were sung by the poet. So, the next day, the poet sang the ‘Todayam’ in which he offered salutations to Garuda, Vishwaksena, Five weapons of the Lord, Alwaars and Aachaaryas. After his Invocation to the Parivaradevatas he composed the Rama Natkam. His compositions became popular as it was noted by Maharaja Tulajaji of the Tanjore court, also Arunachala went to Madras and sang his pieces before a large audience of patrons, scholars and the public. The poet was profusely honoured and has composed a number of songs in praise of his patrons.

== Structure ==
There are the usual six cantos — Bala Kandam, Ayodhya Kandam, Aranya Kandam, Kishkindha Kandam, Sundara Kandam and Yuddha Kandam — prefaced by an introductory verse called Paayiram. The entire opera consists of 278 verses. All the 278 verses were written in various types of metres:- Kochagam-6; Venba- 2; Vachanam-1; Kalithurai-1; Viruthams-268. Arunachala Kavi has utilised only thirty six ragas for the 198 songs. Saveri, Mohana, Madhyamavathi, Asaveri, Sowrashtram, Mukhari, Surali, Atana, Begada, Nadanamakinya are some of the Rakti ragas used. Arunachala wanted to use simple melodies and simple words to convey the story of Ramayana to the common man and hence employed fewer ragas to his compositions. It is of course not certain that the original ragas given by the author have come down correctly in tradition.

== Popularity ==
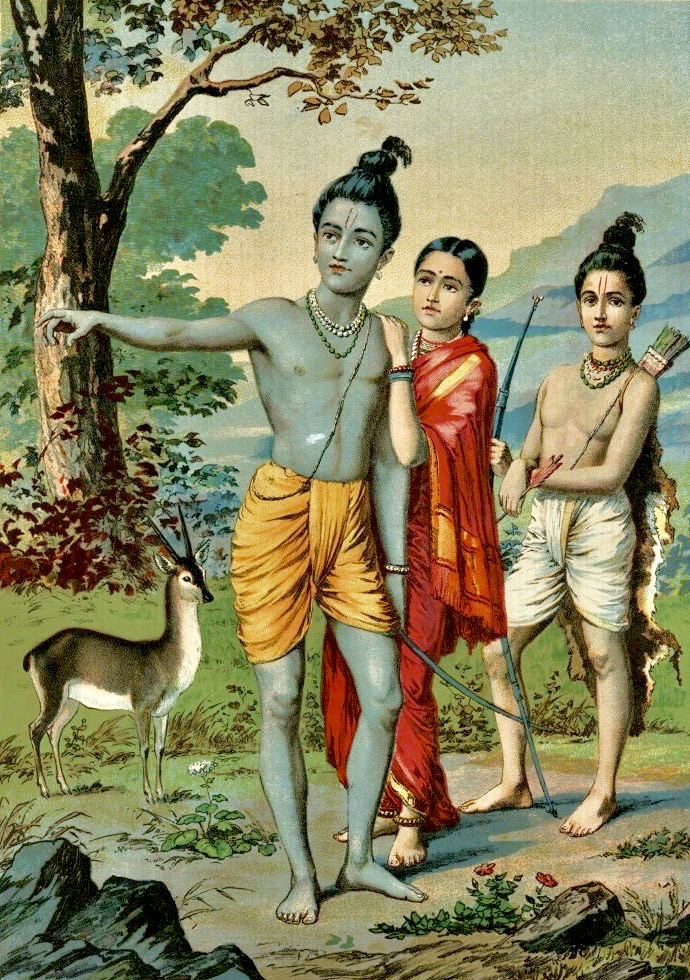
The Keerthana "Arivar Yar" from the Rama Nataka which explains the Legend of Rama, Sita, and Lakshmana in the forest. The song was sung many times by D. K. Pattammal in several concerts.

Arunachala Kavirayar's Rama Natakam was quite popular even in his own times and the public also liked his simple diction which they could follow quite easily. Thus the long cherished wish of the poet that he should popularise Ramayana among the people of Tamil Nadu was fulfilled in a large measure. Out of the Tamil Trinity Arunachala Kavirayar is often considered even more popular than the other two as he wrote the entire Ramayana in the form of songs in simple Tamil so that it could be enjoyed even by the normal people. Some of his famous compositions of Ramanatakam are still popular today like Annai Jaanaki vandale (Saveri), Enpalli kondir iyya (Mohanam), Yaro ivar yaro (Bhairavi), Kanden Kanden Sitayai (Vasantha), Ramanai Kannara Kandane (Mohanam), RAmanukku mannan muDi (Anandabhairavi) and many more. The song Ramanukku Mannan Mudi (A song from the Bala Kandam of Rama Natakam) was sung by Actress P. Bhanumathi in the Tamil movie called Pathu Madha Bandham taken in 1974. Many other songs were sung in several stages. Vishakha Hari a Carnatic music vocalist and proponent of Harikatha, she says that "The simple language of music makes it easy for anybody to understand Harikatha" She has performed several concerts with several dedicated to Rama and Ramayanam on the view of Arunachala kavirayar with his Rama Natakam. The Keerthanas of Rama Nataka are sung by many other great singers like M. S. Subbulakshmi, D. K. Pattammal, Nithyasree Mahadevan, Bombay Jayashri, Bombay Sisters and many other Classical Carnatic singers.

=== Ramanatakam in Thematic Singing and Dancing Concerts ===
Keerthanas or Songs of Rama Natakam is often preferred by singers and Dancers (Classical) to express the Ramayana easily to the audience of Tamil Nadu, Several thematic concerts of Rama Natakam were taken place all over Tamil Nadu. The original ragas set by the composer were lost by time and Ariyakudi Ramanuja Iyengar understood the importance of these compositions and set tune for many keerthanas. Ariyakudi Ramanuja Iyengar sang at least two songs from the Rama Natakam in his each and every concert. From then these keerthanas became even more famous. A Famous example is the year 2008 in Margazhi Maha Utsavam the Ramanatakam was sung by four famous singers where several Ramanatakam keerthanas were sung. The singers were Haricharan, Bharat Sundar, Saindhavi, Sriranajani santhanagopalan. Suki Sivam gave a preface before each song was sung. Several Dancers used Ramanatakam songs to Dance and explain the Ramayana to the audience. A famous example is the Dance consort of Mithun Shyam at the India International Centre, New Delhi performed the Rama Natakam.

== Rama Natakam suited for other platforms ==
Several Songs of Rama Natakam has been automatic choices for hundreds of Carnatic singers for the scope they offer and can be easily understood by normal people. Arunachal Kavi's aim was Ramayana to reach everyone and hence he used simple terms to portray his Ramayana. Rama Nataka has many famous proverbs and sayings which make people understand it easily. Rama Nataka is also taken as a choice by Bharatanatyam dancers. Urmila Satyanarayana says that "Rama Natakam" a masterpiece by Sri Arunachala Kavi, clearly portrays the experience of Rama with other characters of the epic to explain the great character of Rama and uses the Rama Natakam to perform her Rama Rasanubhavam. Many other classical dancers opt these Keerthanas and performs dance shows on Ramayana.

== See also ==
- Ramayana in Tamil literature
- Ramavataram
- Ramayana
- Arunachala Kavi
