= Ramayana in Tamil literature =

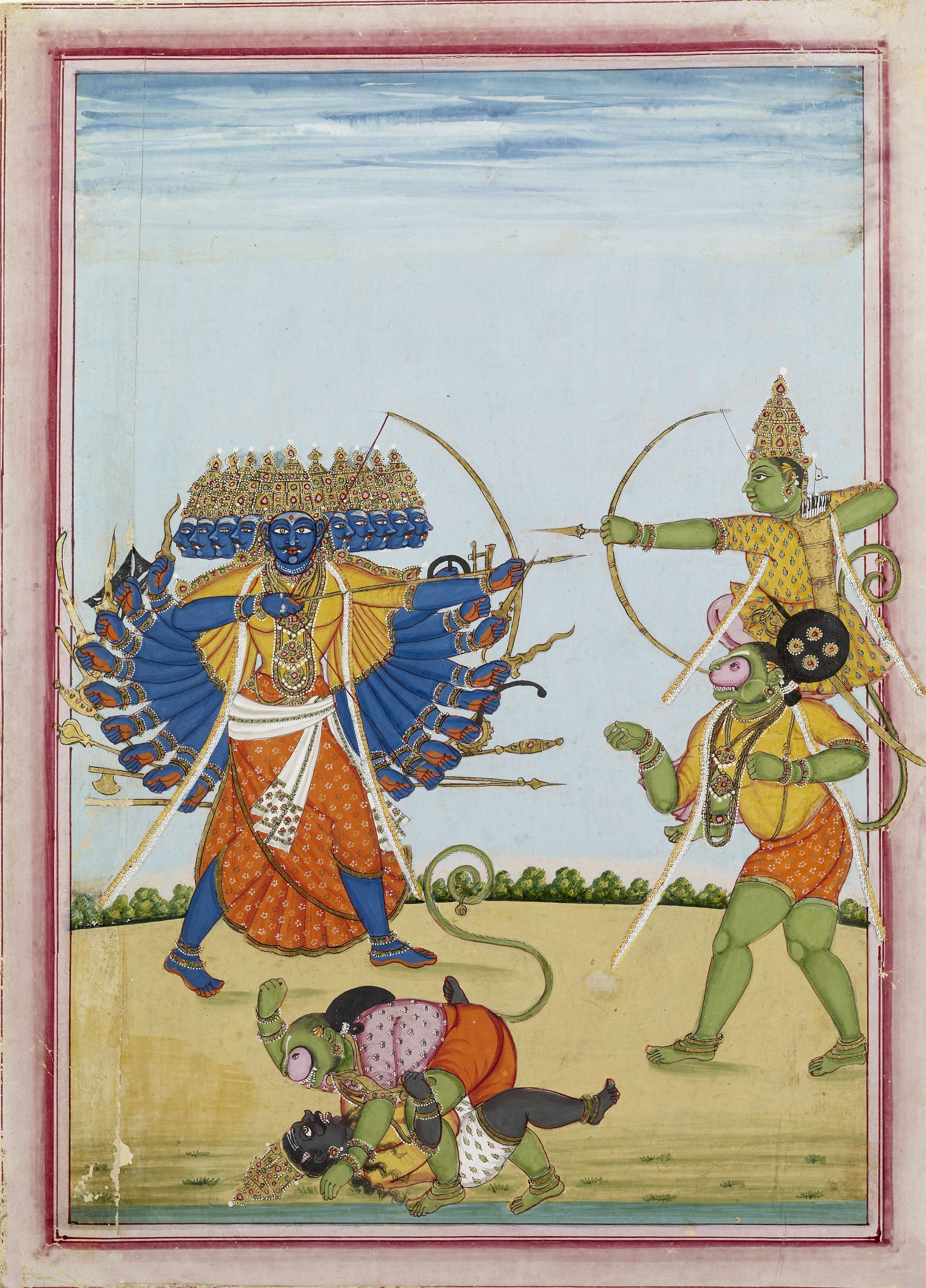
Rama and Hanuman fighting Ravana, an album painting on paper from Tamil Nadu, ca 1820.

Ramayana is one of the ancient Indian epics. According to Robert P. Goldman, the oldest parts of the Ramayana date to the mid-8th century BCE. The story is narrated by the saint poet Valmiki and tells the tale of Prince Rama of the city of Ayodhya, who is banished into the forest, accompanied by his wife Sita and half-brother Lakshmana. During the exile, Sita gets kidnapped by the king Ravana of Lanka, and Rama, with the help of a vanara (primate-like forest dwellers) army, rescues Sita from Lanka. The tale has parallels to the Greek Iliad, the details however differing. The original set in Sanskrit consists of 24,000 verses, and there are several variations in the story narrated in South Asian and South East Asian cultures, across the Indian subcontinent, Thailand and Indonesia, with several versions re-written in various Indian and other Asian languages.

There are earlier references of Ramayana in Sangam literature (300 BCE–300 CE), but the earliest known written version of Ramayana in the Tamil language, is the Ramavataram (popularly known as Kamba Ramayanam) written in the 12th century CE, by Kambar. However, there are references to the Ramayana story in earlier Tamil literature, dating back as the early Tamil literature in CE, which indicate that the story was known in the Tamil lands much before Kamba Ramayana in the 12th century.

== Sangam Literature ==
The age of Sangam literature (Tamil: சங்க இலக்கியம், caṅka ilakkiyam) refers to the ancient Tamil literature roughly extends between 300 BCE and 300 CE, although most of the work is believed to have been composed between 100 CE and 250 CE.

=== Purananuru ===
The earliest reference to the story of the Ramayana is found in the Purananuru which is dated from 1st century BCE and 5th century CE. Purananuru 378, attributed to the poet Unpodipasunkudaiyar, written in praise of the Chola king Karikala. The poem makes the analogy of a poet receiving royal gifts and that worn by the relatives of the poet as being unworthy for their status, to the event in the Ramayana, where Sita the wife of the invincible Rama drops her jewels when abducted by demon Ravana and these jewels being picked up red-faced monkeys who delightfully wore the ornaments (Hart and Heifetz, 1999, pp. 219–220).

=== Akanaṉūṟu ===
Akanaṉūṟu, which is dated between 1st century BCE and 2nd century CE, has a reference to the Ramayana in poem 70. The poem places a triumphant Rama at Dhanushkodi, sitting under a Banyan tree, involved in some secret discussions, when the birds are chirping away.

== Twin Epics of the Common Era ==
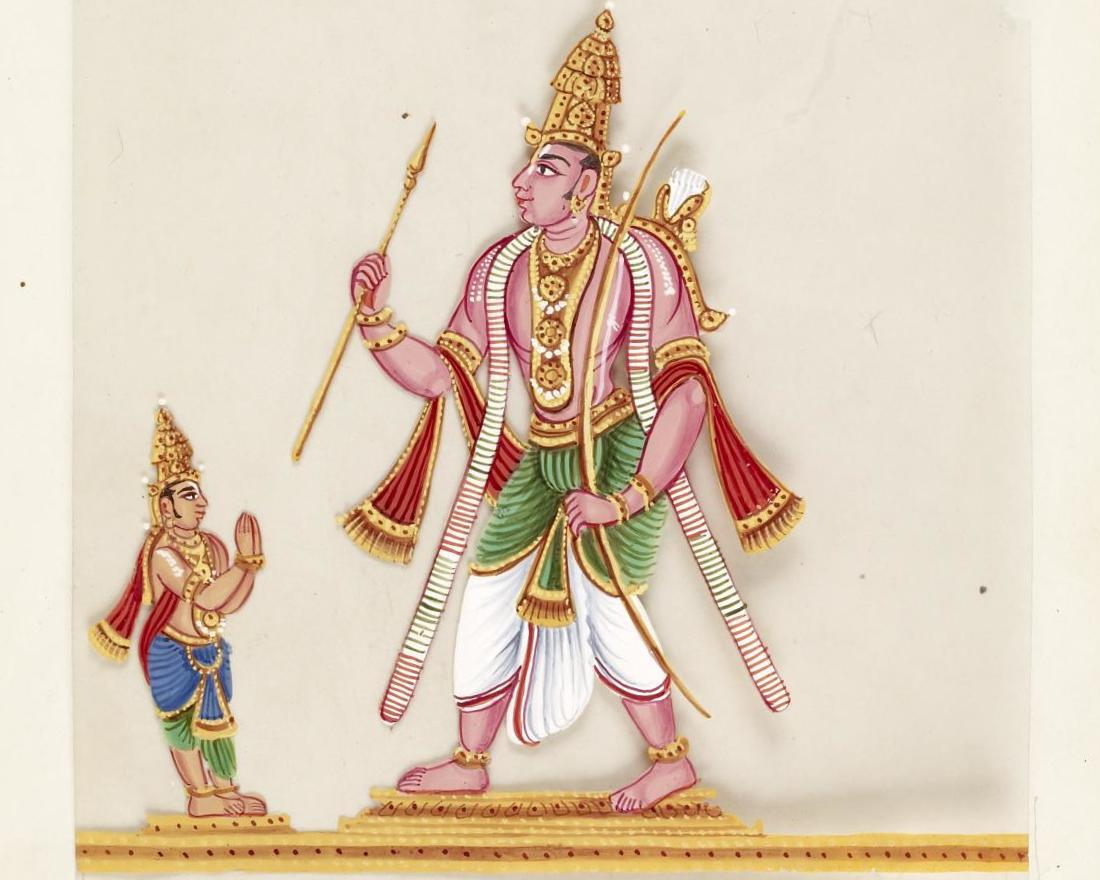
Rama portrayed as Incarnation of Vishnu

=== Cilappatikaram ===
The Cilappatikaram written by a prince turned Jain monk Ilango Adigal, dated to the 2nd century CE or later. The epic narrates the tale of Kovalan, son of a wealthy merchant, his wife Kannagi, and his lover Madhavi, and has many references to the Ramayana story. It describes the fate of Poompuhar suffering the same agony as experienced by Ayodhya when Rama leaves for exile to the forest as instructed by his father (Dikshitar, 1939, p. 193). The Aycciyarkuravai section (canto 27), makes mention of the Lord who could measure the three worlds, going to the forest with his brother, waging a war against Lanka and destroying it with fire (Dikshitar, 1939, p. 237). This seems to imply on Rama being regarded as divinity, rather than a mere human. These references indicate that the author was well aware of the story of the Ramayana in the 2nd century CE.

the very city of Puhar of ancient fame has gone mad — like Ayodhya at the separation of the great hero Rama who left it and penetrated the thick jungles saying, ‘To me the kingdom is nothing, but my father’s command is everything’

— Silappadikaram, Book 8, Lines 64-68, translated by V. R. Ramachandra Dikshitar

=== Manimekalai ===
Manimekalai written as the sequel to the Cilappatikaram by the Buddhist poet Chithalai Chathanar, narrates the tale of Manimekalai, the daughter of Kovalan and Madhavi, and her journey to become a Buddhist Bhikkuni. This epic also makes several references to the Ramayana, such as a setu (bridge) being built by monkeys in canto 5, line 37 (however the location is Kanyakumari rather than Dhanushkodi). In another reference, in canto 17, lines 9 to 16, the epic talks about Rama being the incarnate of Trivikrama or Netiyon, and he building the setu with the help of monkeys who hurled huge rocks into the ocean to build the bridge. Further, canto 18, lines 19 to 26, refers to the illegitimate love of Indra for Ahalya the wife of the rishi Gautama (Pandian, 1931, p. 149)(Aiyangar, 1927, p. 28).

== Alvar literature ==
The Alvars were Vaishnavite Tamil poets -saints of South India who composed literature preaching bhakti (devotion) to the god Vishnu and his avatars. Modern scholars place Alvar literature between the 5th and 10th centuries CE.

=== Kulasekhara Alvar ===
Kulasekhara Alvar is the seventh in the line of the 12 Alvars. Kulasekhara Alvar rules as the Chera king of Travancore, with scholars dating his period as first half of the 9th century CE. The king gradually takes interest in religious matters, much to the concern of his ministers. On a certain occasion, on hearing the narration of the Ramayana incident of Rama standing up to the battle against demons, he plunges into the sea to swim to Ceylon to rescue Sita. His compositions include the Perumal Tirumoli in Tamil and Mukundamala in Sanskrit (Hooper, 1929, p. 20).

=== Thirumangai Alvar ===
The Periya Tirumoli, written by Thirumangai Alvar (8th century CE) in verse 8, refers to Guhan, the fisherman king who Rama persuades not to follow him into exile while crossing the Ganges, and Hanuman, the son of the wind god Vayu (Hooper, 1929, p. 41).

=== Andal ===
Andal's Tiruppavai, verse 12 makes mention of "the Lord Rama who slew the Lord of Lanka, Ravana" (Hooper, 1929, p. 53). and verse 24 of Tiruppavai states "We worship your fame of winning over the king of Southern Lanka". Andal mentions five incidents which are written in the Puranas, Mahabharatha and Ramayana in this single 24th verse which shows that Sangam literature used Sanskrit literature as references in their literature.

=== Nammalvar ===
Nammalvar's Tiruviruttam, verse 36, speaks of the friend of the Alvar who criticises the Lord who once destroyed the crowded halls of Lanka (for the sake of Sita), but fails to relieve the grief of the Alvar (Hooper, 1929, p. 71).

== Tamil kingdoms and their belief on Ramayana ==
The Chola king Parantaka I named himself "Sangrama Raghava" after his conquest of Sri Lanka, while his son Aditya I was called Kothandarama. Some later Pandya kings also made contributions to the temple's of Rama. A mutilated inscription in the temple Adi Jagannatha Perumal Temple made during the 37th year of Maravarman Sundara Pandyan in 1305 records order of a minister by name Arya Chakravarthi. Historians believe some portions of the Adi Jagannatha Perumal Temple tower might also have been built by Jaffna kings, who were friends of Pandya Empire and also rulers of Rameswaram.

Another Famous temple of Rama called as Eri-Katha Ramar Temple was built during the Pallava era, and is estimated to be 1600 years old. The Moolavar (presiding deity) of the temple is Rama, thus making this one of the oldest temples of lord Rama in South India. The temple has inscriptions indicating generous gifts from Chola king Parantaka I. The place was once famous during the rule of Cholas who ruled this place as Maduranthaga Chaturvedi Mangalam after the Chola ruler Madurantaga Uttama Chola (973 -85 CE). It is believed that Gandaraditya donated the village to the Vedics (Chaturvedi - one who knows all four vedas) of the place and hence it came to be known as Chaturvedi Mangalam.

There are many other temples dedicated to Rama in Tamil Nadu.

== Rama Natakam ==
The entire Ramayana was written as a Tamil Opera again in the 18th century CE by Arunachala Kavirayar in Srirangam. The Ramayana was named as Rama Natakam and was composed in Tamil Language. Arunachala Kavi was fascinated by the epic Ramayana so much that he wanted to impart the story and the good lessons preached by it to a large number of persons who could not obviously read the entire epic in original. He composed the entire Ramayana in the form of songs together as an opera so even normal people could understand his Ramayana. His compositions are so famous that his Rama Natkam Keerthanas are still alive and sung by many singers. Many dancers also use the Rama Nataka Keerthanas to perform thematic concerts.
