= Tamil Trinity Memorial Hall =

Tamil Trinity Memorial Hall, also referred to as Tamil Trinity Mani Mandapam or lit. 'Tamizhisai Moovar Mani Mandapam' in Tamil, is a memorial located in Sirkazhi, Mayiladuthurai district in Tamil Nadu, India. The hall commemorates the Tamil Trinity of Carnatic music - Muthu Thandavar, Arunachala Kavi and Marimutthu Pillai who were prominent composers from Sirkazhi.

== Background ==
The Tamil Trinity refers to an earlier group of Carnatic music composers who lived about five decades before the well-known Trinity of Carnatic music Tyagaraja, Muthuswami Dikshitar, and Shyama Shastri. The Tamil Trinity composed and sang all their works in the Tamil language. They are credited with developing the keertana (kriti) form of carnitic musical composition and giving a structured format to Pallavi, Anupallavi, and Charanam in Carnatic music.

In 2010, the DMK-led government initiated the construction of a memorial hall and allocated 19,160 square feet (1,780 square metres) of land on the Mayiladuthurai to Chidambaram highway near Sirkazhi. Construction began on 2 August 2010, and the majority of the work was completed by the end of 2011. The memorial hall was later inaugurated on 20 February 2013 by then Chief Minister J. Jayalalithaa of the AIADMK-led government via video conference.

== Architecture ==
The memorial hall was constructed on an area of 4,772 square feet (443.3 square metres). Its facade features full-length bronze statues of the Tamil Trinity. At the center of the hall, seven kalasams are placed, symbolizing the seven walls.

== See also ==
- Sirkazhi
- Tamil Trinity
- Carnatic music
