= Muthu Thandavar =

Carnatic music composer

Muthu Thandavar (1525–1600 CE) (Tamil:முத்துத்தாண்டவர்) was a composer of Carnatic music. He lived in the town of Sirkazhi in Tamil Nadu. His contributions to Carnatic music have been largely forgotten and not many of his kritis are in vogue today. Muthu Thandavar, along with Arunachala Kavi (1712–1779) and Marimutthu Pillai (1717–1787) are known as the Tamil Trinity of Carnatic music.

Muthu Thandavar also composed several padams, short songs mainly sung accompanying Bharatanatyam performances. Some of these padams are still popular such as Teruvil Varano in raga Khamas and Ittanai Tulambaramai in raga Dhanyasi.

== Compositions ==
Very few of Muththu Thandavar's compositions have survived the test of time. Sixty of them have been collected. Twenty five padams are also available. Some of his compositions that are sung in music concerts are:

- Bhooloka Kailasa-His first composition (Raga Bhavapriya)
- Arumarundhonru Thani Marundhidhu (Raga Mohanam or Kambhoji)
- Pesadhe Nenjame (Raga Todi)
- Innamum Oru Thalam (Raga Todi)
- Kanammal Vinile (Raga Neelambari, Dhanyasi or Kambhoji)
- Teruvil Varano-Padam (Raga Khamas)
- Ittanai Tulambaramai-Padam (Raga Dhanyasi)
- Unai Nambinen Ayya (Raga Keeravani)
- Isane Koti Surya Prakasane (Raga Nalinakanti)
- Darishittha Alavil (Raga Latangi or Saranga)
- Sevikka Vendumayya (Raga Andolika)
- Innum Oru Taram (Raga Simhendramadhyamam)
- Ambara Chidambaram (Raga Jana Ranjani)
- Innum Oru Sthalam (Raga Surutti)
- Aadi Kondaar (Raga Mayamalavagowla)
- Ayyane Natanam (Raga Saveri)
- Arar Asai Padar (Raga Nadanamakriya)
- Chidambarame Ninai Maname (Raga Nadanamakriya)
- Shivachidambarame (Raga Nagasvaravali)
- Darishnam Seivene (Raga Vasantha)
- Kanamal Irundhal (Raga Kalyani)
- Ambara Chidambara (Raga Surutti, Sunadavinodini or Jana Ranjani)
- Sambho Sankara Mahadeva (Raga Shanmukhapriya)
- Chithsabhai Thanile (Raga Neelambari)
- Shivantha Padhathai (Raga Sankarabharanam)
- Enru Sendru Kanben (Raga Kapi)
- Maravadhiru Nenjame (Raga Malayamarutam)
- Kandapin Kan (Raga Malayamarutam or Shankarabharanam)
- Innam Piravamale (Raga Madhyamavati)

== See also ==
- Tamil Trinity Memorial Hall
