= Lalitha (raga) =

Janya raga of Carnatic music

- Arohanam: S R₁ G₃ M₁ D₁ N₃ Ṡ
- Avarohanam: Ṡ N₃ D₁ M₁ G₃ R₁ S

Lalitha is a raga in Carnatic music (musical scale of South Indian classical music). It is a janya raga of Mayamalavagowla, the 15th Melakarta raga. It is closely related to Vasantha, as the two share many characteristic prayogas and have similar scales. Lalitha is often used In Tamil film songs, especially by Ilayaraja who has composed five film songs based on this ragam.

== Structure ==
Lalitha is a symmetric scale that does not contain panchamam. It is called a shadava raga structure is as follows (see swaras in Carnatic music for details on below notation and terms):

- ārohaṇa : S R₁ G₃ M₁ D₁ N₃ Ṡ (Note: Alternate notations: Hindustani: S Ṟ G M Ḏ N Ṡ; Western: C D♭ E F A♭ B C)
- avarohaṇa : Ṡ N₃ D₁ M₁ G₃ R₁ S (Note: Alternate notations: Hindustani: Ṡ N Ḏ M G Ṟ S; Western: C B A♭ F E D♭ C)

This scale uses the notes shadjam, shuddha rishabham, antara gandharam, shuddha madhyamam, shuddha dhaivatham and kakali nishadam.
