= Iyarpagai Nayanar =

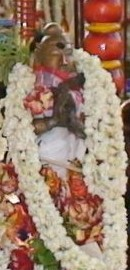

Personal life
- Born: 3rd Century BCE Puhar
- Honors: Nayanar saint,

Religious life
- Religion: Hinduism
- Philosophy: Shaivism, Bhakti

Iyarpagai Nayanar, also known as Iyarpagaiar, Iyarpahai Nayanar, Iyarpagaiya Nayanar and Iyarppakai Nayanar is a Nayanar saint, venerated in the Hindu sect of Shaivism. He is generally counted as the third in the list of 63 Nayanars.

== Life ==
The life of Iyarpagai Nayanar is described in the Tamil Periya Puranam by Sekkizhar (12th century), which is a hagiography of the 63 Nayanars. His name "Iyarpagai" means "Contrary to Nature", as the Nayanar's excessively philanthropic ways were against the worldly ways of Nature.

Iyarpagai Nayanar was born in Kaveripoompattinam (also known as Puhar or Poompuhar), a port city located at the mouth of the river Cauvery where it meets the Bay of Bengal. Puhar, the ancient capital of the Chola kingdom is located in Mayiladuthurai district in the Indian state of Tamil Nadu. Iyarpagai Nayanar belonged to the Vaishya (merchant) caste. A staunch Shaiva (devotee of the god Shiva), he served Shiva and his devotees. A wealthy merchant, he built of a reputation that he never refused to anything a devotee of Shiva would ask for.

Once, Shiva decided to test the married Iyarpagai. The god disguised himself as a Shaiva (sivanadiyar; member of the priest caste) and arrived at Iyarpagai's home, where he was welcomed by Iyarpagai and his wife. The elderly sivanadiyar said he had come to Iyarpagai, having heard tales of Iyarpagai's generosity. Upon enquiry about what he wanted, the sivanadiyar asked for Iyarpagai's wife to come to his house and look after him and his household tasks. The sivanadiyar said he never married due to a vow of chastity and did not have any children to look after him in his old age. Therefore, he needs someone to look after him as if he was their own father. Although, since the sivanadiyar continued to work as a pujari in his faraway town, for her to serve the sivanadiyar she would have to live there which was very faraway from their hometown and she would not be able to be with her husband.

The merchant told his wife about the request, who was initially appalled, but later consented considering it as the command of her husband. Iyarpagai's wife worshipped the sivanadiyar feet and readied to proceed with the sivanadiyar. The visitor asked another favour of Iyarpagai. He requested the merchant to escort him and the wife to outside the town and protect him against his kin. Iyarpagai took his sword and shield and accompanied his guest and his wife on their journey.

Meanwhile, the relatives of the wife and Iyarpagai, were infuriated that she was to become a virtual slave instead of living her life. Armed with various weapons, they caught with the trio in the way and threatened the "lecherous" sivanadiyar. As the sivanadiyar looked at his caregiver frightened, she comforted him, while the merchant warned the kin to flee or face his wrath. Iyarpagai, who was skilled in warfare, charged at the opposing host and massacred his kindred, chanting the Shiva Panchakshara, following onslaughts from all sides. As the trio approached Tiru Chaikadu (presently known as Sayavanam), the sivanadiyar told Iyarpagai Nayanar to return. The Nayanar prostrated before the sivanadiyar and left. Suddenly, he heard the sivanadiyar cries of help and rushed back to check any one had attacked the sivanadiyar again. When Iyarpagai reached the spot, the sivanadiyar had disappeared and his wife stood alone. Lord Shiva and Goddess Parvati appeared before the couple. The Nayanar bowed in reverence; Shiva praised the Nayanar's devotion as took the couple to Kailash, his divine abode. The relatives killed by the Nayanar attained Svarga (heaven).

== Remembrance ==
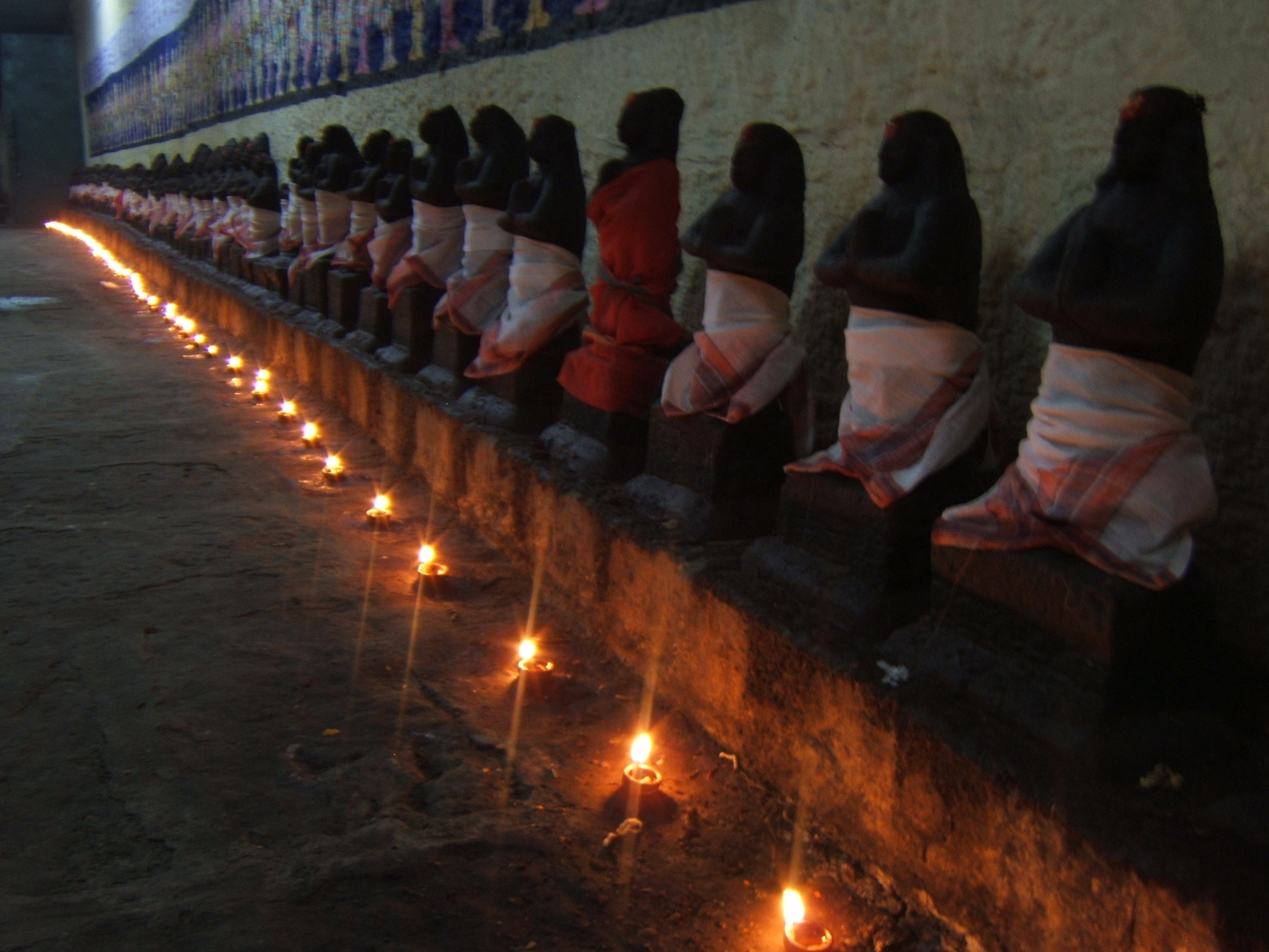
The images of the Nayanars are found in many Shiva temples in Tamil Nadu.

One of the most prominent Nayanars, Sundarar (8th century) venerates Iyarpagai Nayanar in the Tiruthonda Thogai, a hymn to Nayanar saints, praising as the one who was munificent. The Tamil poet Gopalakrishna Bharati (1810–1896) has composed a musical play Iyarpagai Nayanar Charitram, which has 21 songs and some verses based on the life of the Nayanar.

Iyarpagai Nayanar is worshipped in the Tamil month of Margazhi, when the moon enters the Uttara Phalgunī nakshatra (lunar mansion). He is depicted with a crown and folded hands (see Anjali mudra). He receives collective worship as part of the 63 Nayanars. Their icons and brief accounts of his deeds are found in many Shiva temples in Tamil Nadu. Their images are taken out in procession in festivals.

The Chayavaneswarar Temple dedicated to Shiva in Sayavanam, where Shiva is described to have appeared before Iyarpagai Nayanar, has a special affiliation with the Nayanar. After bathing in Kaveri's mouth at Puhar, devotees worship at this temple. A shrine dedicated to Iyarpagai Nayanar and his wife, exists in the temple. A special five-day temple festival is celebrated around the great Iyarpagai Nayanar's holy day of salvation in Margazhi. In the Tamil months of Chithirai and Vaikasi (April to June, which correspond to the summer months), it is a tradition to offer water and buttermilk to visiting devotees in the name of the Nayanar, in the temple.
