= Arunachala Kavi =

Tamil poet and Carnatic music composer (1711–1779)

Arunachala Kavi (Tamil: அருணாசல கவி) (1711–1779) was a Tamil poet and a composer of Carnatic music. He was born in Tillaiyadi, which was formerly part of Thanjavur District and is now located in Mayiladuthurai district in Tamil Nadu. The three Tamil composers Arunachala Kavi, Muthu Thandavar and Marimutthu Pillai are considered the Tamil Trinity, who contributed to the evolution of Carnatic music. He composed the famous opera Rama Natakam.

== Life ==
His father died when he was 12, and during that time he went to Dharmapuram Adheenam to continue his studies in Sanskrit and Tamil. The head of Mutt was so pleased with him and even considered making Arunchala as his successor. At 18, Arunachala left the Mutt and continued his studies in Tamil for another 12 years. He got married at the age of 30 in a place called Karuppur and earned his livelihood by setting up a jeweller's shop.

He wanted to buy gold at a cheaper rate, therefore he travelled to Pondicherry. On his way, he stopped at Seerkazhi, and found a branch of Dharmapuram Mutt. The head was his old colleague named Chidambaram. Chidamabaram convinced him and his family to settle in Seerkaazhi. Therefore, he got the name Seerkaazhi AruNaachala Kavi. Arunachala lived a major part of his active life in the town Seerkazhi. As he was running a jeweller shop, this not only provided him with a good living, but also with a fair amount of leisure to pursue his literary studies. Just as he was good at “estimating the fineness of the precious metal, he was equally proficient at estimating the worth of the literary works.” Two books were most liked by him — The Tirukkural of Tiruvalluvar and The Kambar's Ramavataram, While the former was only a book of ethics, the latter gave the same in the form of a story which would be more appealing to the common man.

== Arunachala Kavi's Rama-Natakam ==
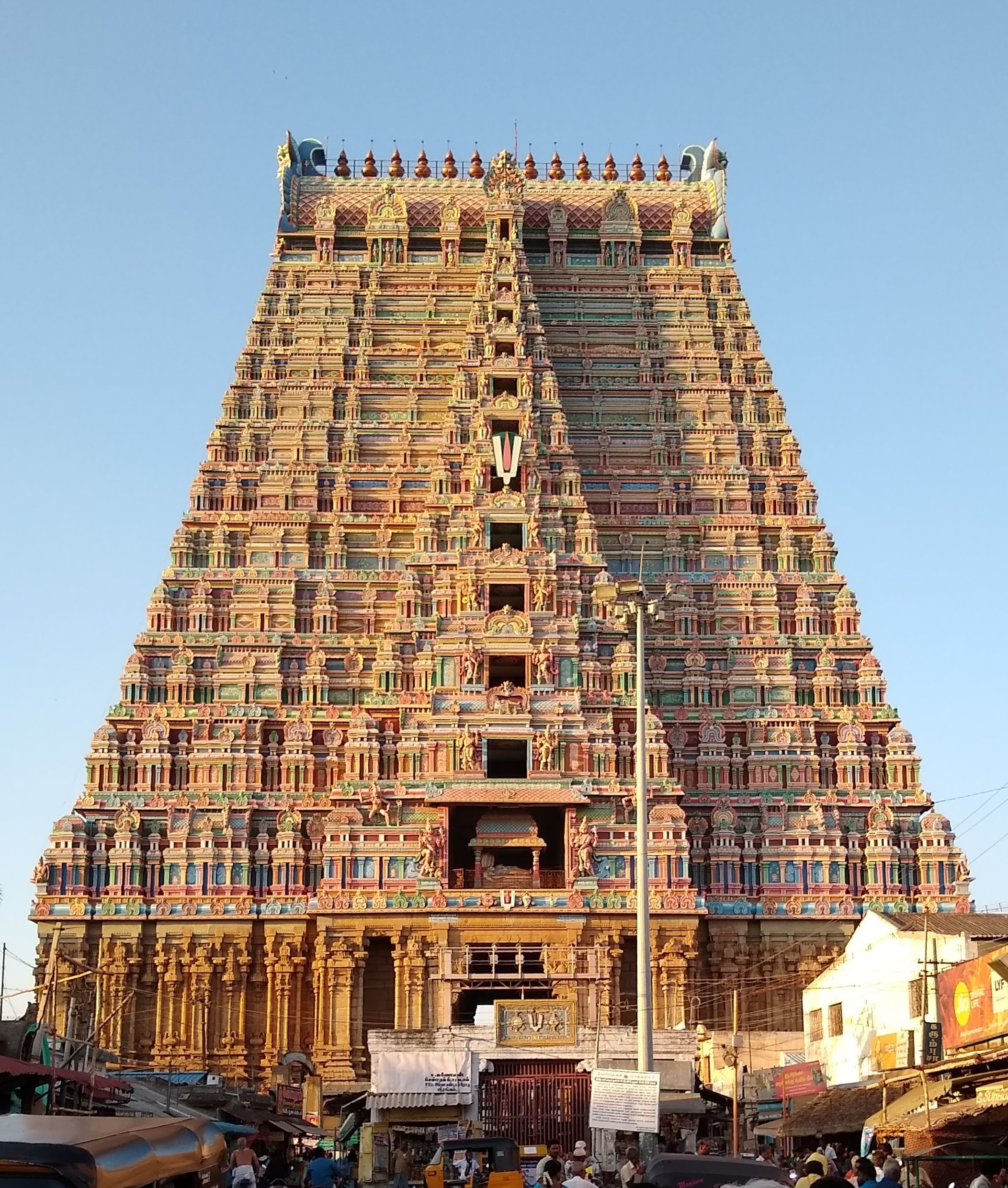
Srirangam Ranganathaswamy temple was the place where both the Kambar's Ramavataram and Arunachala Kavirayar's Rama Natakam were composed in this Temple.

Arunachala Kavi was fluent in Tamil, and Sanskrit. He wrote Rama Natakam, a musical drama based on the Ramayana. Kavirayar was fascinated by the Ramayana so much that he wanted to impart the story and the good lessons preached by it to a large number of persons who could not obviously read the entire epic in original. He gave a number of discourses on the epic. Two of his disciples, Venkataraman Iyer and Kodandaraman Iyer who were very proficient in music, requested him to compose songs from Kambar's Ramavataram.

Arunachala kavi wanted his work also to be officially noted and released in the premises of Srirangam Ranganathaswamy temple as the shrine had some association with the actual story of Ramayana. He marched towards Srirangam and requested permission from the temple authorities. Arunachala sat in a part of the temple and composed a very beautiful song named as “En Pallikondeeraiyaa” (O Lord! why did you stop and sleep here?) in Kedaragowla, set to Adi tala. That night both the poet and the temple Priests had separate visions. The poet was asked to sing about the Parivaara Devatas and the priest was asked to accept Arangetram after such songs were sung by the poet. His compositions became popular as it was noted by Maharaja Tulajaji of the Tanjore court, also Arunachala went to Madras and sang his pieces before a large audience of patrons, scholars and the public. The poet was profusely honoured and has composed a number of songs in praise of his patrons.

Arunachala Kavirayar's works were quite popular even in his own times and the public also liked his simple diction which they could follow quite easily. Thus the long cherished wish of the poet that he should popularise Ramayana among the people of Tamil Nadu was fulfilled in a large measure. Out of the Tamil Trinity Arunachala Kavirayar is often considered even more popular than the other two as he wrote the entire Ramayana in the form of songs in simple Tamil so that it could be enjoyed even by the normal people. Some of his famous compositions of Ramanatakam are still popular today like Annai Jaanaki vandale (Saveri), Enpalli kondir iyya (Mohanam), Yaro ivar yaro (Bhairavi or Saveri), Kanden Kanden Sitayai (Vasantha), Ramanai Kannara Kandane (Mohanam), RAmanukku mannan muDi (Anandabhairavi) and many more.

== See also ==
- List of Carnatic composers
- Tamil Trinity Memorial Hall
