= Marimutha Pillai =

Marimuthu Pillai (1712 – 1787 CE) was a composer of Carnatic music and, along with Arunachala Kavi and Muthu Thandavar, was one of the pioneering Tamil Trinity of Carnatic music. He was a contemporary of Arunachala Kavi. He was born in Thillaividangan, near Sirkazhi, located in Mayiladuthurai district in Tamil Nadu.

== Compositions ==
- Orukal Sivachidambaram in Arabhi.
- Thillai Chidambarame in Kapi Narayani
- Enna Thunivai in Saramati
- Kalai Thookki in Yadukulakamboji.
- Edhukkittanai in Surutti
- Enneramum in Hanumatodi
- Darisittalavil Mukthi in Saranga
- Kanamal Irundal En in Chakravakam
- Darisittha Perai in Kedaragowla
- Chidambaram Sthalathile in Srikanthi

== See also ==
- List of Carnatic composers
- Tamil Trinity Memorial Hall
