= Tamil Trinity =

The Tamil Trinity (also known as the Tamil Moovar), or Shiyali Trinity, commonly refers to three Tamil composers of early Carnatic music, all hailing from the city of Shiyali (Sirkazhi). They were Muthu Thandavar (1525–1600 CE), Arunachala Kavi (1711–1779) and Marimutthu Pillai (1712–1787), and lived five decades before the Tiruvarur Trinity or Trinity of Carnatic Music. They introduced several innovations that led to the evolution of the Carnatic kriti (song).

A memorial hall was constructed in honor of the Tamil Isai Moovar, in Sirkazhi.

== See also ==
Tamil Trinity Memorial Hall
