= Saveri =

Janya raga of Carnatic music

- Arohanam: S R₁ M₁ P D₁ Ṡ
- Avarohanam: Ṡ N₃ D₁ P M₁ G₃ R₁ S

Saveri (pronounced sāvēri) is a Carnatic music ragam. This raga is a janya of the 15th Melakarta raga Mayamalavagowla. This raga brings out karuna rasa, i.e. it brings mood of compassion.

== Structure and Lakshana ==
Ascending scale with Shadjam at C

Descending scale with Shadjam at C

This ragam is an Audava-Sampurna ragam (five notes in the ascending scale and seven notes in the descending scale).

- ārohaṇa: S R₁ M₁ P D₁ Ṡ (Note: Alternate notations: Hindustani: S Ṟ M P Ḏ Ṡ; Western: C D♭ F G A♭ C)
- avarohaṇa: Ṡ N₃ D₁ P M₁ G₃ R₁ S (Note: Alternate notations: Hindustani: Ṡ N Ḏ P M G Ṟ S; Western: C B A♭ G F E D♭ C)

The notes are shuddha rishabham, shuddha madhyamam and shuddha dhaivatam in ascending scale and kakali nishadam, shuddha dhaivatam, shuddha madhyamam, antara gandharam and shuddha rishabham in descent. The two swaras which give the raga such a characteristic are R (Rishabham) and D (Dhaivatham).

== Related rāgams ==
- Karnataka Shuddha Saveri is a pentatonic scale which has a symmetric descending scale as the ascending scale, which is same as the ascending scale of Saveri, while Saveri has a sampurna descending scale. Its ārohaṇa-avarohaṇa structure is S R1 M1 P D1 S : S D1 P M1 R1 S
- Malahari is a audava-shadava scale (5 notes in ascending and 6 in descending scale) that resembles Saveri. Its ascending scale has shuddha madhyamam in place of antara gandharam, while the nishadham is dropped in descending scale. Its ārohaṇa-avarohaṇa structure is S R1 M1 P D1 S : S D1 P M1 G3 R1 S
