= Vasantha (raga) =

Janya raga of Carnatic music

- Arohanam: S M₁ G₃ M₁ D₂ N₃ Ṡ
- Avarohanam: Ṡ N₃ D₂ M₁ G₃ R₁ S

Vasantha (pronounced vasantā) is a raga in Carnatic music (musical scale of South Indian classical music). It is a janya raga of Suryakantam, the 17th Melakarta raga. According to P|Subba Rao, majority opinion is that the raga is derived from Mayamalavagowla, the 15th Melakarta raga.

Vasantha is suitable to be sung in evening and is considered an auspicious raga.

== Structure ==
Vasantha is an asymmetric scale that does not contain panchamam. It is called a vakra audava-shadava raga, malathiga structure is as follows (see swaras in Carnatic music for details on below notation and terms):

- ārohaṇa : S M₁ G₃ M₁ D₂ N₃ Ṡ (Note: Alternate notations: Hindustani: S M G M D N Ṡ; Western: C F E F A B C)
- avarohaṇa : Ṡ N₃ D₂ M₁ G₃ R₁ S (Note: Alternate notations: Hindustani: Ṡ N D M G Ṟ S; Western: C B A F E D♭ C)

This scale uses the notes shadjam, shuddha rishabham, antara gandharam, shuddha madhyamam, chathusruthi dhaivatham and kakali nishadam. Some claim that Vasantha had only D1 and not D2 originally.

Arohanam and avarohanam for Vasantha with tambura

== Related ragas ==
- Lalitha is a popular raga that sounds very similar to Vasantha. Lalitha uses shuddha rishabham in ārohaṇa also, while the shuddha dhaivatam is used in it, compared to chatusruti dhaivatam in Vasantha.
