= Pugal Chola =

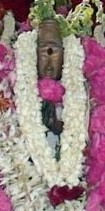

Personal life
- Born: Uraiyur
- Honors: Nayanar saint,

Religious life
- Religion: Hinduism(Shaivism)
- Philosophy: Shaivism, Bhakti

Pugal Chola, also known as Pukal Chola, Pukazhchozha Nayanar, Pugazh, Pukazhcchozhar, Pukal Cholan and Pugal Chola Nayanar, is described as a Chola ruler and was a Nayanar saint, venerated in Shaivism, one of the main sects of Hindu. He is generally counted as the eighth in the list of 63 Nayanars.

== Life ==
Eripatha trying to Suicide and Pugal Chola protecting.

The life of Pugal Chola is described in the Periya Puranam by Sekkizhar (12th century), which is a hagiography of the 63 Nayanars. Pugal Chola is described as an early Chola king. However, his dating is uncertain. His historicity seems "probable" and he could one of the legendary early Cholas. He is described as the ancestor of Kulothunga Chola II (Anapaya), who reigned between 1133 and 1150 CE. He is described a contemporary of Eripatha Nayanar, another Nayanar saint.

Pugal Chola ruled the Chola kingdom from its capital Uraiyur, presently a neighbourhood of the Indian city of Tiruchirappalli. He is described as a devotee of Shiva, the patron god of Shaivism. He appears in two chapters in the Periya Puranam. In the chapter of Eripatha Nayanar, a detailed account of his encounter with fellow Nayanar, Eripatha Nayanar, is given. His primary account in his chapter relates to his death in Karuvur, generally identified as the Indian city of Karur, which is famous for its Pasupateeswarar temple dedicated to Shiva.

Pugal Chola is described as an ideal monarch who served his subjects, Shiva and devotees of Shiva. Shaivism prospered under his reign. He was the emperor of the region and had numerous vassals. Once, he visited Karuvur, which was one of the chief towns of the Chola kingdom. Once on the day of Maha Navami, the royal elephant of the Chola was being paraded through the town. The elephant saw Sivakami Andar and seized the basket of flowers from his hands and crushed the flowers, which were meant for the worship of Shiva. Seeing the wailing devotee, Eripatha not only slew the beast, but also its mahout and accompanying guards who failed in their duty to control the elephant. The news of murder of the royal elephant reached Pugal Chola.

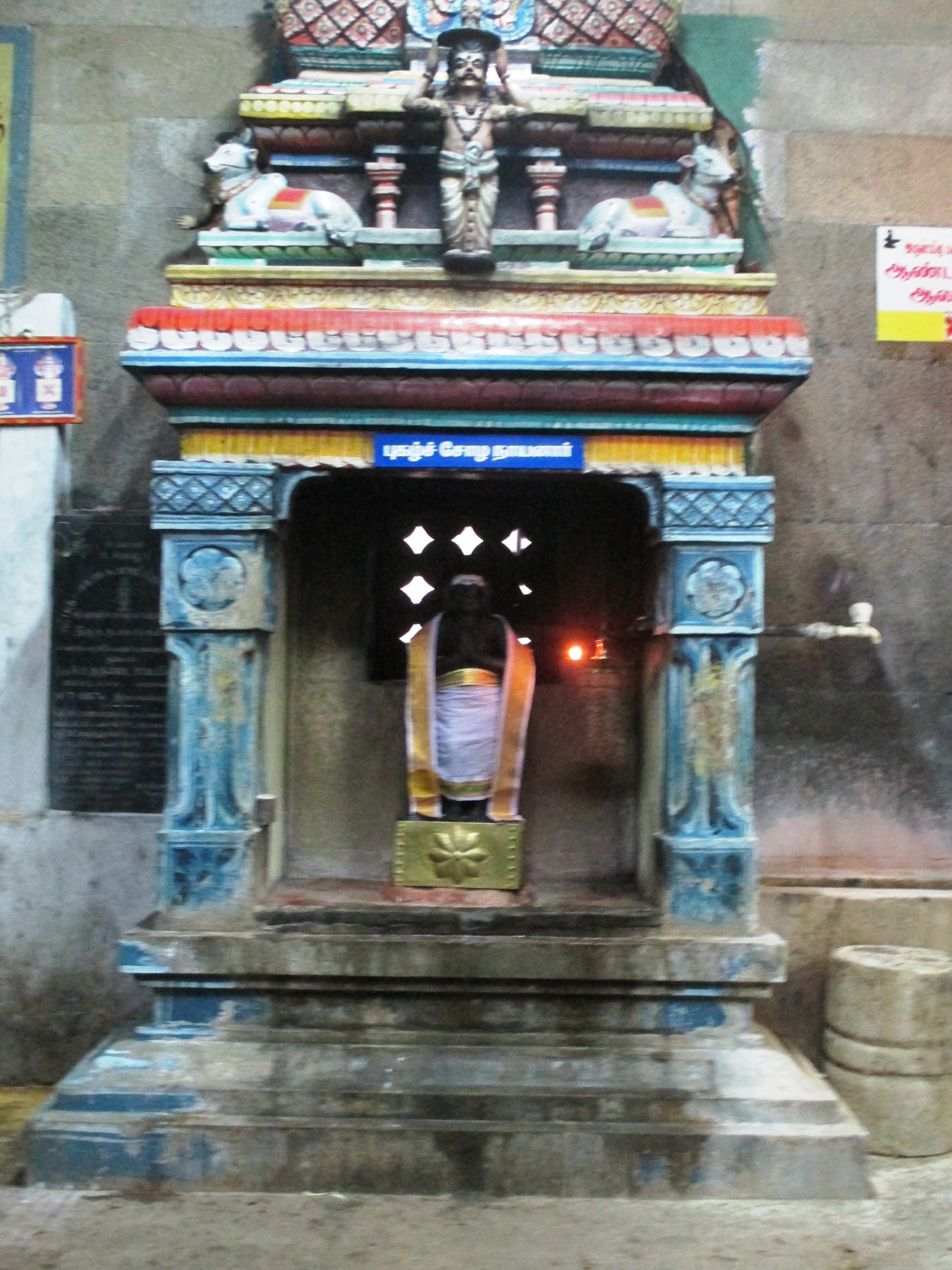
Pugal Chola Nayanar is associated with the Panchavarnaswamy Temple in Uraiyur - a shrine dedicated to him. The top of the shrine has the sculpture of the saint holding the severed head above his head.

The enraged king reached the spot of the massacre. While the king expected an army who challenged his authority, he saw a lone crusader standing over the elephant. Upon enquiry, the guards pointed to and introduced Eripatha as the slayer of the elephant. Pugal Chola alighted from his horse and bowed to the angry Eripatha in reverence and asked about the crime of his elephant and men. Eripatha informed him of the events leading to the killing and said that he had punished them for a sin against Shiva. The Chola felt it was his moral responsibility. He bent before the Nayanar and presenting his sword asked the Nayanar to kill him too, as the king is ultimately culpable for the actions of his elephant and army. Eripatha was taken aback by the king's devotion and actions and felt remorseful. He thought it would be best to commit suicide by the sword as penance for the murders. As Eripatha raised the sword to cut his head, the horrified king held his hands to stop him. As they struggled with the sword to sacrifice their lives, Shiva appeared pleased with their devotion and blessed them. He also resurrected the elephant and the king's men. Sivakami Andar's basket was also restored with flowers. Eripatha was given the honour of seating on the royal elephant, while the king held the royal umbrella over his head, like a slave. Both of them went to the Pasupateeswarar temple and worshipped Shiva.

While in Karuvur, the Chola king learnt that a vassal prince named Adigan (Adiyaman) was due to pay tributes to the king. The king declared war on the vassal and ordered his troops to destroy the enemy fort. An account of a fierce battle is told in the Periya Puranam. Ultimately, the Chola army triumphed, annihilating the armies of Adigan and razing this fort to dust. Adigan escaped death, by abandoning his citadel. The Chola warriors arrived with the wealth and women from Adigan's city and brought severed heads of their fallen foes as a sign of valour. As the king surveyed the pile of heads, he saw a head with matted hair. On further investigation, he realized his soldiers had killed a Shaiva ascetic. To expiate the sin of killing a devotee of Shiva, he decided to end his life. He crowned his son as the king. He built a funeral pyre. He smeared his body with sacred ash and took the head of the devotee in a golden, jewel-studded vessel on his head. He circumambulated the blazing flames, reciting the Panchakshara mantra to placate Shiva and finally plunged into the fire. For his supreme sacrifice, he attained Kailash, the abode of Shiva after his death.

== Remembrance ==
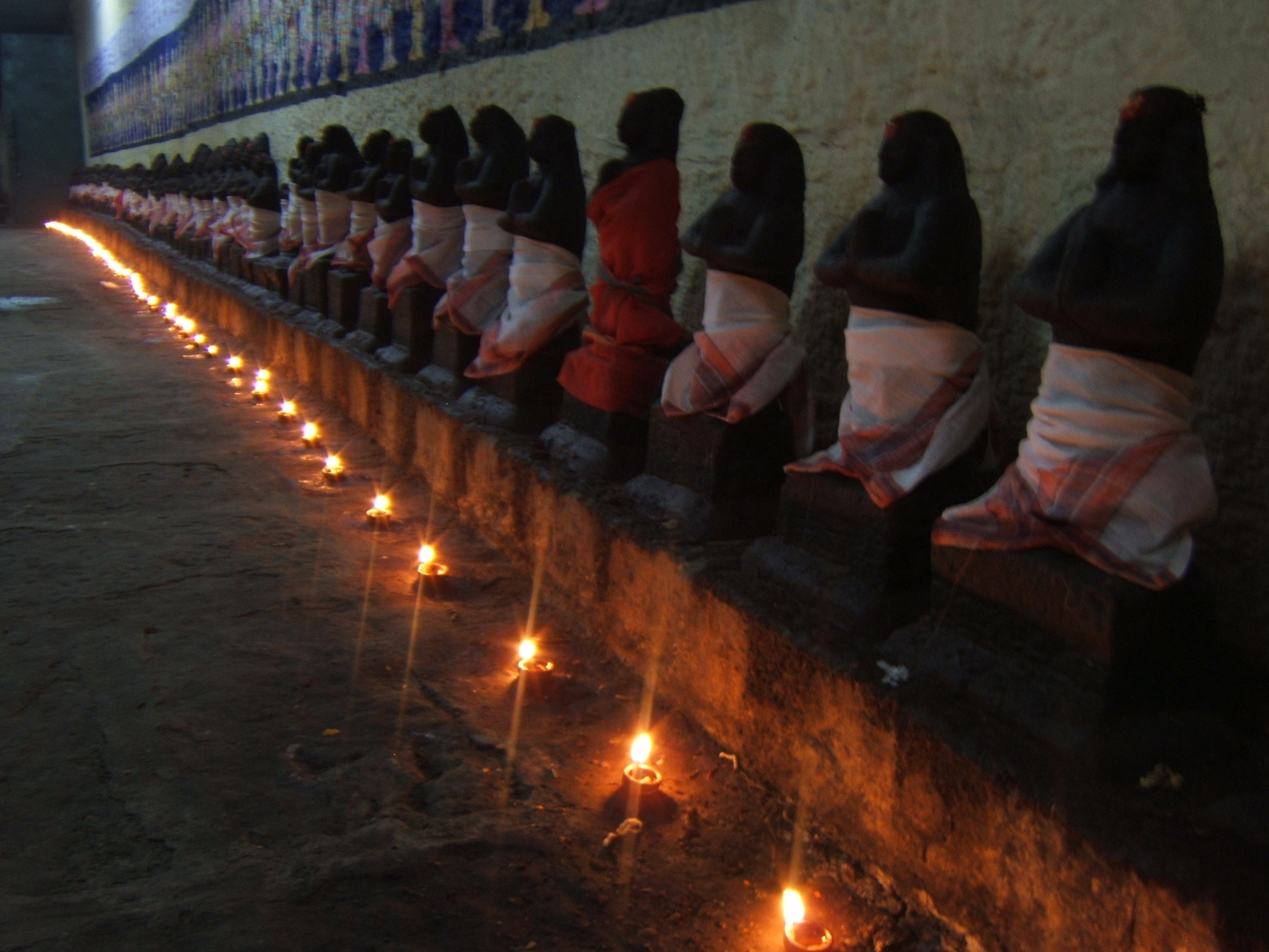
The images of the Nayanars are found in many Shiva temples in Tamil Nadu.

Pugal Chola is depicted wearing regal clothes and a crown, with folded hands (see Anjali mudra) and with a sword in crook of his hand. A holy day in his honour is observed in the Tamil month of Adi, where the moon enters the Krittika Nakshatra (lunar mansion). He receives collective worship as part of the 63 Nayanars. Their icons and brief accounts of his deeds are found in many Shiva temples in Tamil Nadu. Their images are taken out in procession in festivals.

One of the most prominent Nayanars, Sundarar (8th century) mentions Pugal Chola in hymn to various Nayanar saints. He is described to have been killed in war in Karuvur.
