= Thanthondreeswarar Temple, Woraiyur =

Temple in India

Thanthoneeswarar Temple
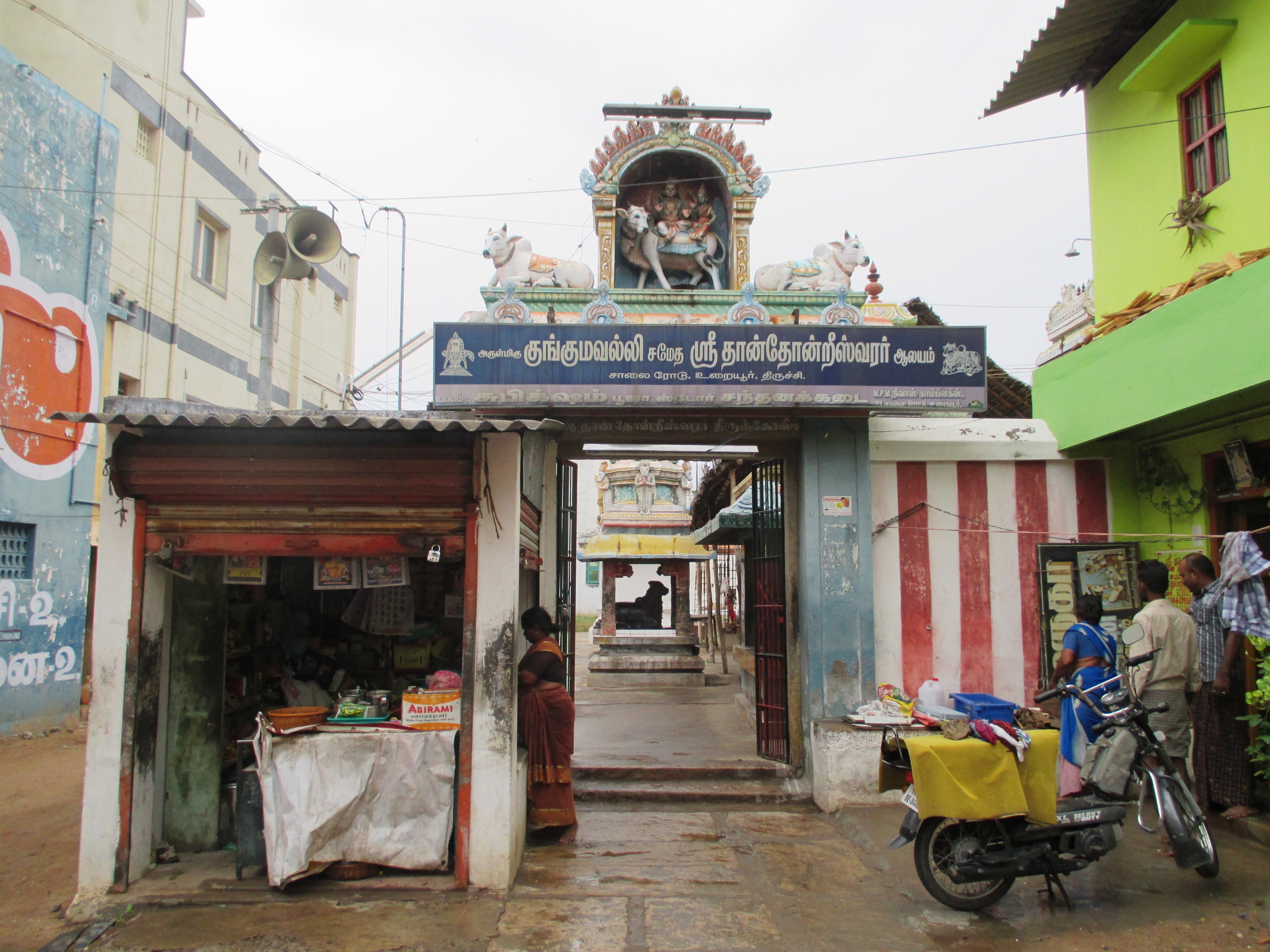

- Location in Tamil Nadu

Religion
- Affiliation: Hinduism
- District: Tiruchirapalli
- Deity: Thanthoneeswarar

Location
- Location: Woraiyur
- State: Tamil Nadu
- Country: India
- Coordinates: 10°22′N 78°51′E

Architecture
- Type: Dravidian architecture

Thanthoneeswarar Temple (also called Thanthonrisvaram) is a Hindu temple dedicated to Shiva, located in Woraiyur, a suburb in the town of Tiruchirapalli in Tamil Nadu, India. The temple was built by the Pandya ruler Varaguna Pandiyan II during the 9th century. It has inscriptions dating back to 885 AD during the rule of Cholas.

The temple is associated with the legend of Shiva appearing as helper or mid-wife for the pregnant Chola Queen Kanthimathi. The bangle festival called valaigkappu celebrated during the Tamil month Thai (January – February) is the most prominent festival celebrated in the temple.

== Etymology and legend ==
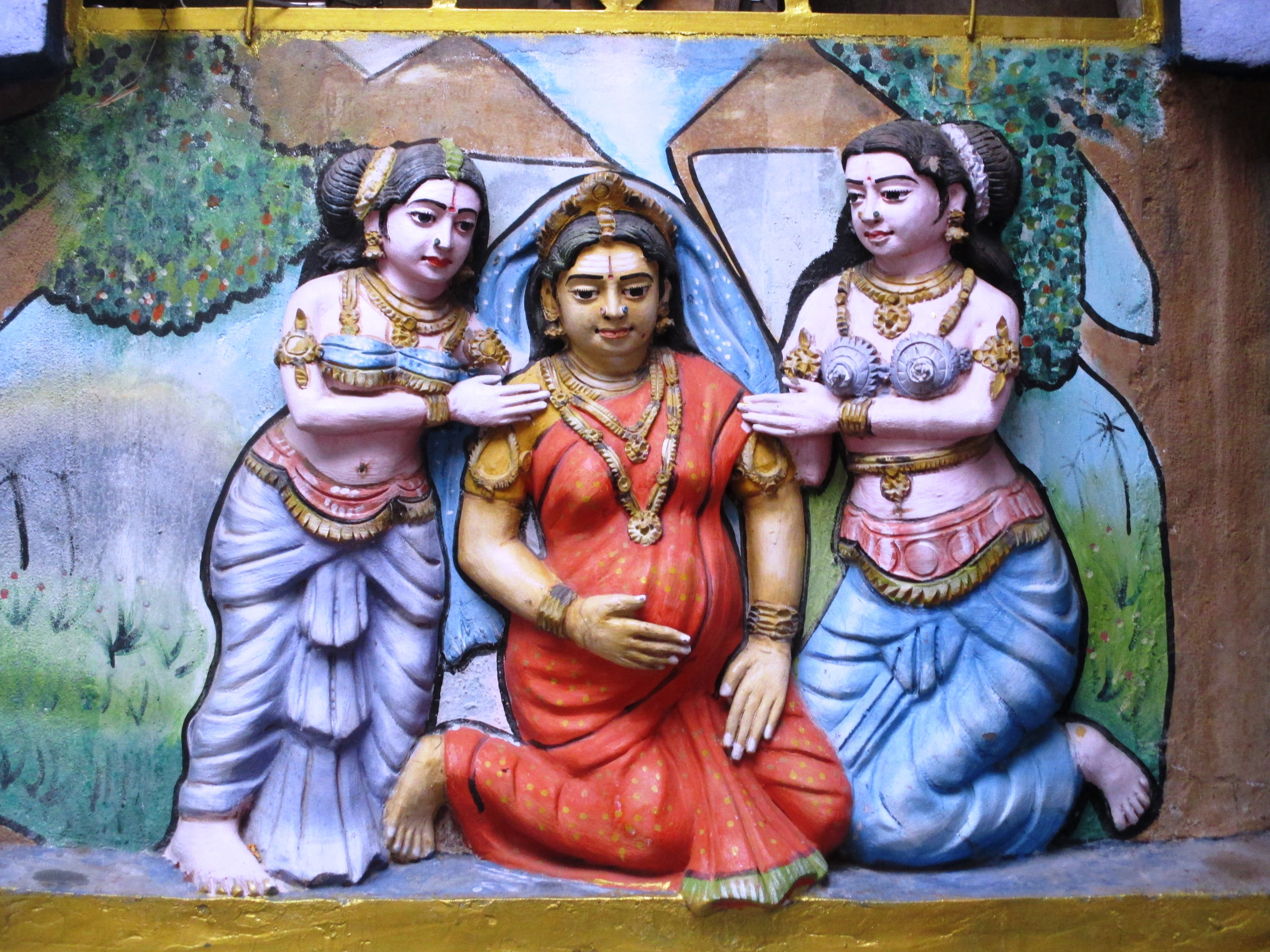
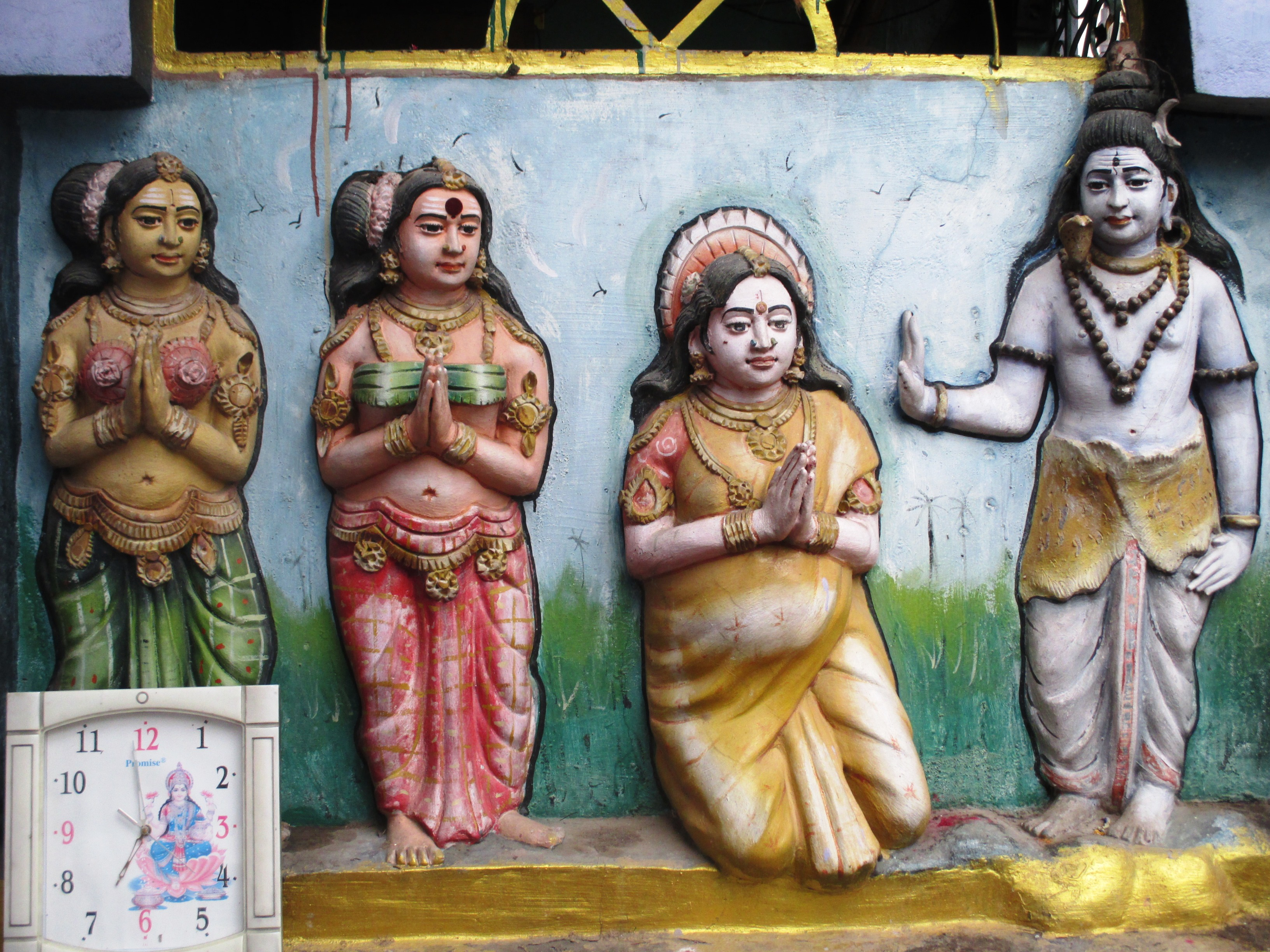
Stucco images in the temple indicating the legend

Thanthoneeswarar, the presiding deity of the temple, derives its name from Tamil word Thanthondri, meaning the one who formed on his own. As per Hindu legend, Chola queen Kanthimathi was an ardent devotee of Shiva and worshipped Shiva in the temple now known as Thayumanavar swamy Temple. When she was pregnant, she could not climb the hill to reach the temple. Shiva was pleased by the devotion of the queen and is believed to have appeared to her in the form of lingam (an iconic form of Shiva) at this place on his own and blessed her with a safe delivery.

== History ==
The temple was built by the Pandya ruler Varaguna Pandiyan II during the 9th century. It has inscriptions dating back to 885 AD during the rule of Cholas. The temple, in modern times, is maintained and administered by hereditary trustees. The temple has an inscription from The inscriptions speak about the donation made by Ananthan Chandramadhiyar from Chola period recording a gift made by the queen of Thennavan Ilangovar, a feudatory of the Kodumbalur clan. The record gifts golden jewelry as a deposit to the temple, the income of which was to be utilized for desilting the temple tank. The inscriptions was made during the regime of Parantaka I during 911. The remaining amount from the gold was to be utilized for perpetual lighting of the temple. Similar inscriptions are found in other temples in the Trichy region like Vayalur, Allur, Andanallur, Paluvur and Thirupparaitturai indicating the supremacy of the Chola clan along with their relation with the Kodumbalur clan. Historians assign the date of Parantaka to the temple based on the image of Ardhanareeswara.

== Architecture ==
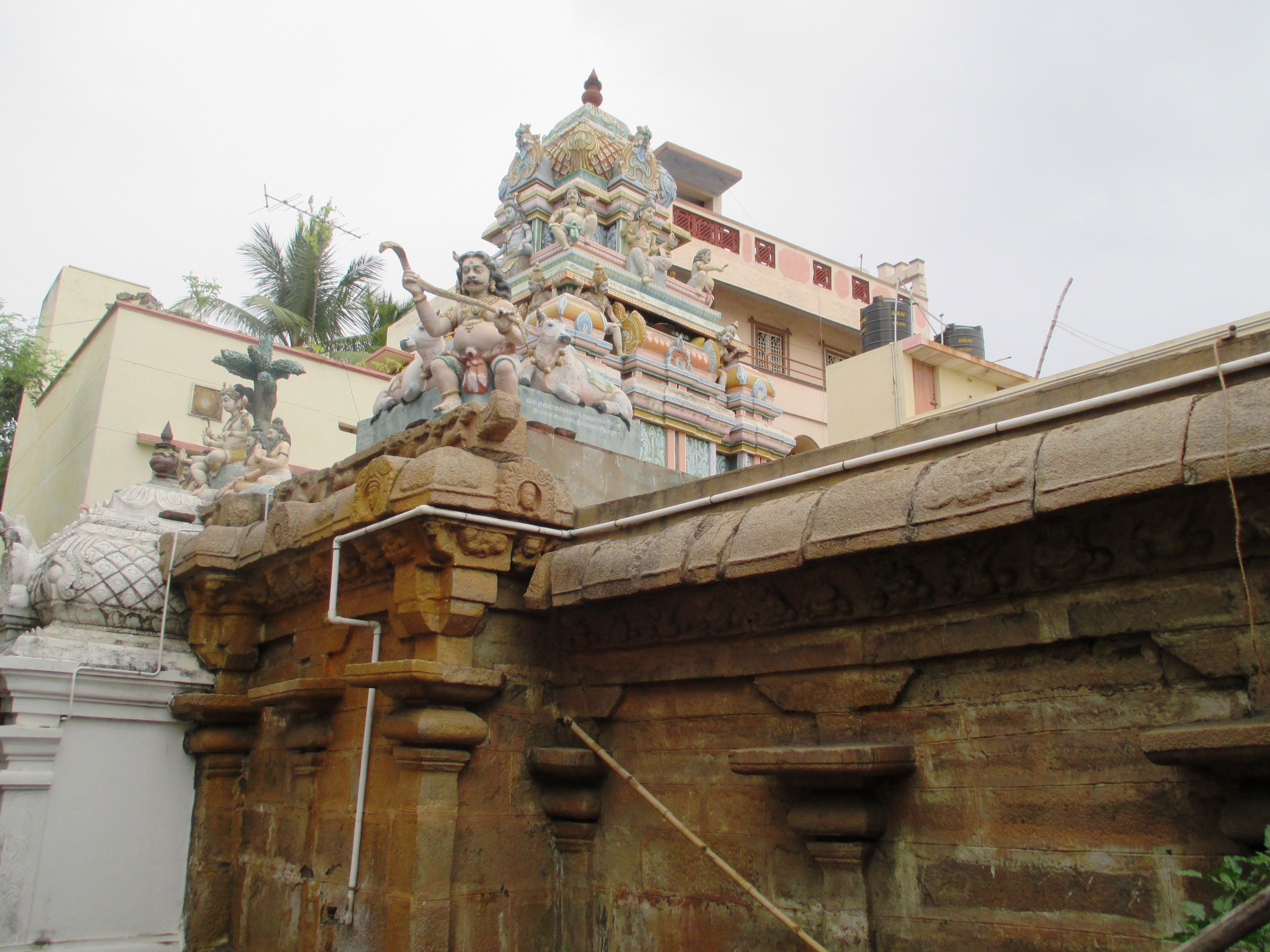
view of the shrines of the temple

Thanthoneeswarar temple complex has a single prakaram (outer courtyard) and a two-tiered vimana (tower over the sanctum). The central shrine faces east and holds the image of Thanthoneeswarar (Shiva) in the form of lingam made of granite. The granite images of the deities Ganesha (son of Shiva and god of wisdom), Murugan (son of Shiva and god of war), Nandi (the bull and vehicle of Shiva) and Navagraha (nine planetary deities) are located in the hall leading to the sanctum. As in other Shiva temples of Tamil Nadu, the first precinct or the walls around the sanctum of Thanthoneeswarar has images of Dakshinamurthy (Shiva as the Teacher), Durga (warrior-goddess) and Chandikeswarar (a saint and devotee of Shiva). The shrine of Kunkumavalli, the consort of Thanthoneeswarar, faces North and is depicted with Ankusam and lotus in her two hands. The temple precinct is surrounded by granite walls. Unlike other South Indian temples, the temple does not have any Gopuram, an ornamental temple tower. These are typical of the early medieval regime Chola temples. The original walls of the temple carrying some of inscriptions are still present in the temple, while the surrounding structure are of recent origin.

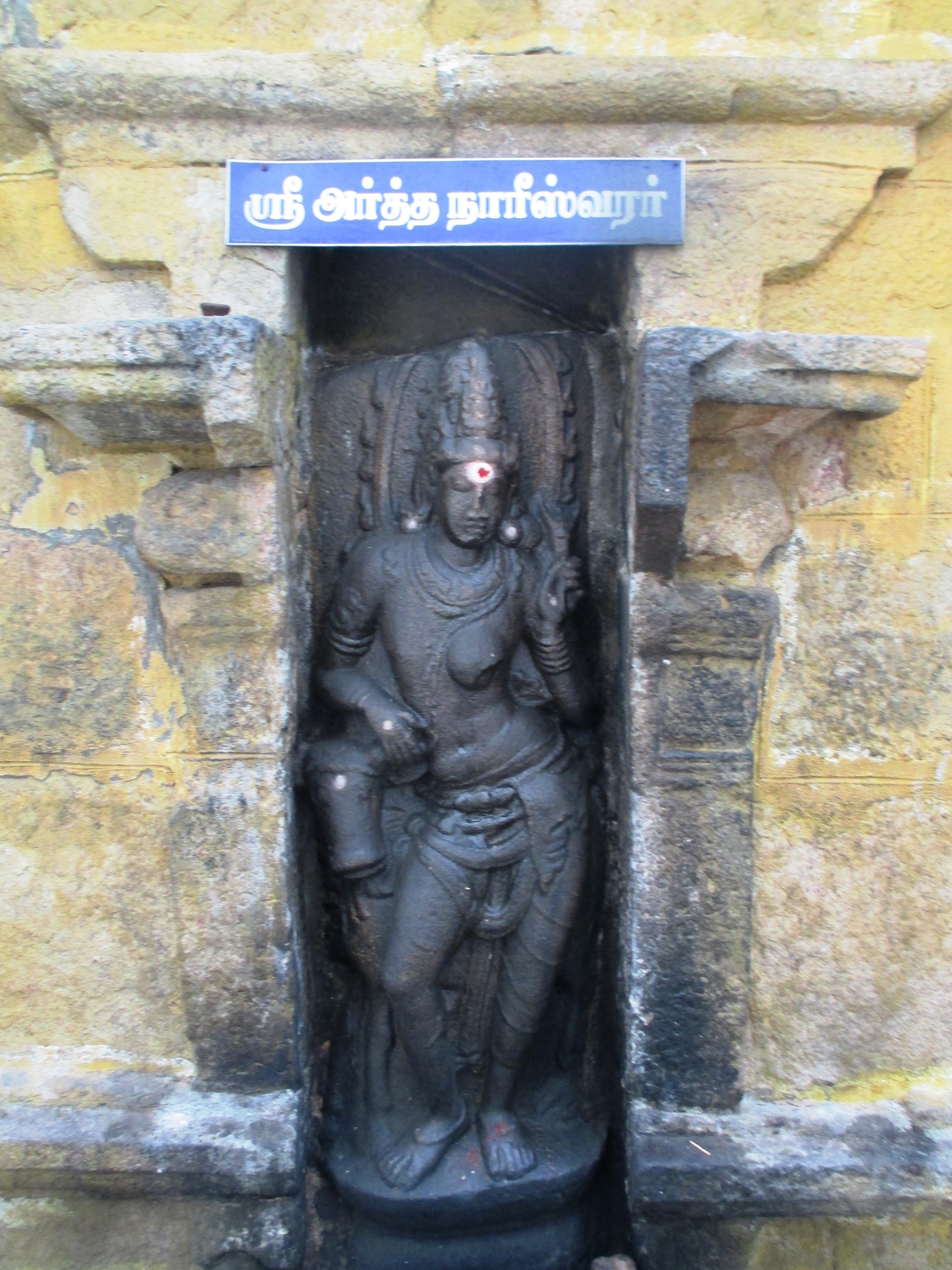
Image of Ardhanarishvara

Commemorating the event of Kanthimathi giving bangles to the Naga deity during her pregnancy, a bangle festival is celebrated during the Tamil month of Thai.
