= Vekkali Amman Temple =

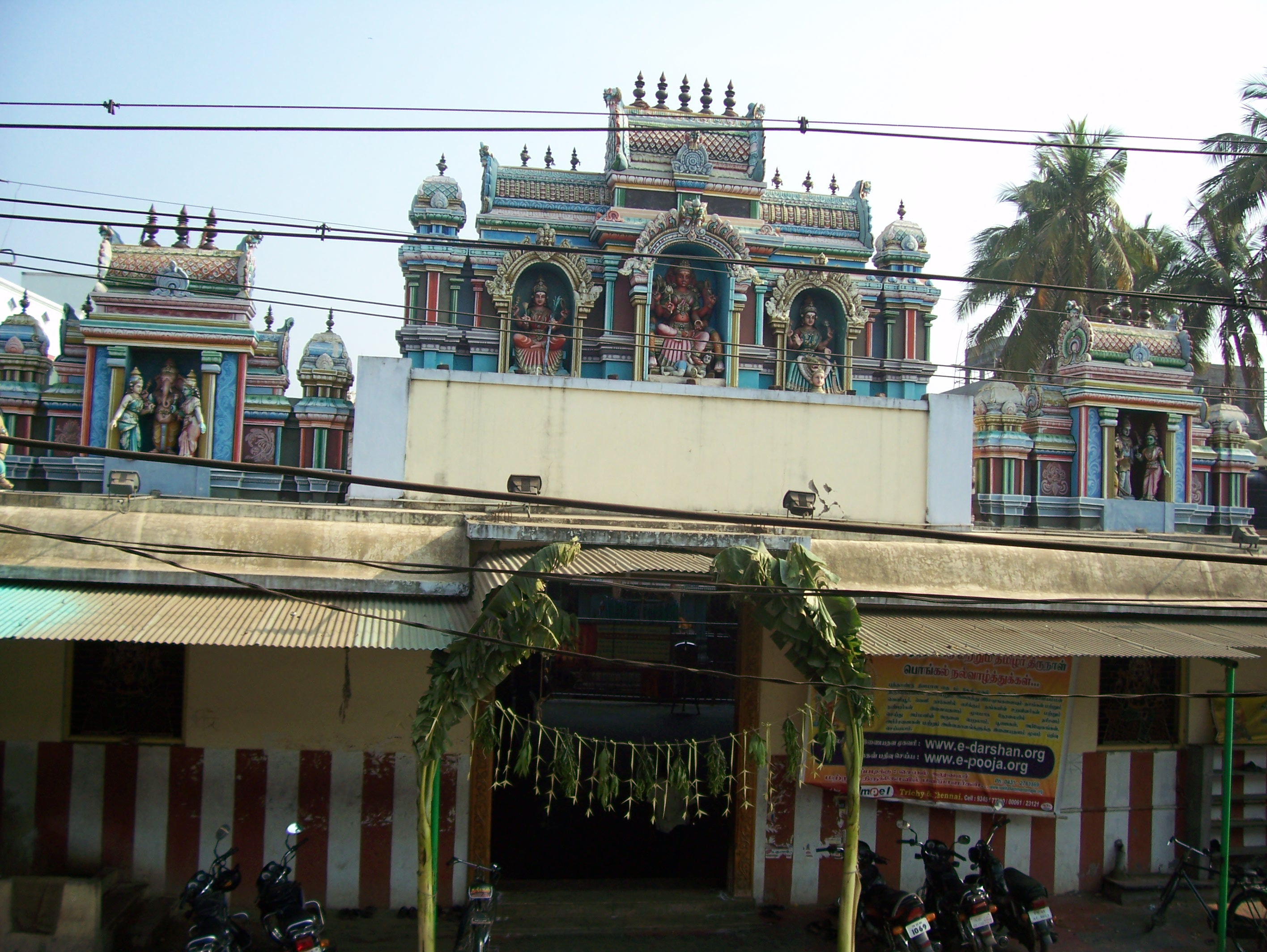
- Southern entrance of the temple

- Location in Tamil Nadu

Religion
- Affiliation: Hinduism
- District: Tiruchirappalli
- Deity: Vekkali Amman

Location
- Location: Woraiyur
- State: Tamil Nadu
- Country: India
- Coordinates: 10°50′20.5368″N 78°40′11.8164″E

Architecture
- Type: Dravidian architecture

Website
- http://www.woraiyurvekkaliamman.tnhrce.in

Vekkali Amman Temple is a temple to Vekkaali, a form of the Hindu goddess Kali, in Woraiyur, a neighbourhood in Tiruchirappalli, Tamil Nadu, India. The central shrine of the temple houses the image of Vekkali Amman and the major feature of the temple is the absence of roof over the sanctum. The temple is known from the period of early Cholas, but there are no historical records. The people of Woraiyur see Vekkali Amman as their guardian deity. The temple chariot is made of gold and was launched during 2010. The temple is maintained and administered by the Hindu Religious and Endowment Board of the Government of Tamil Nadu.

== Religious significance ==
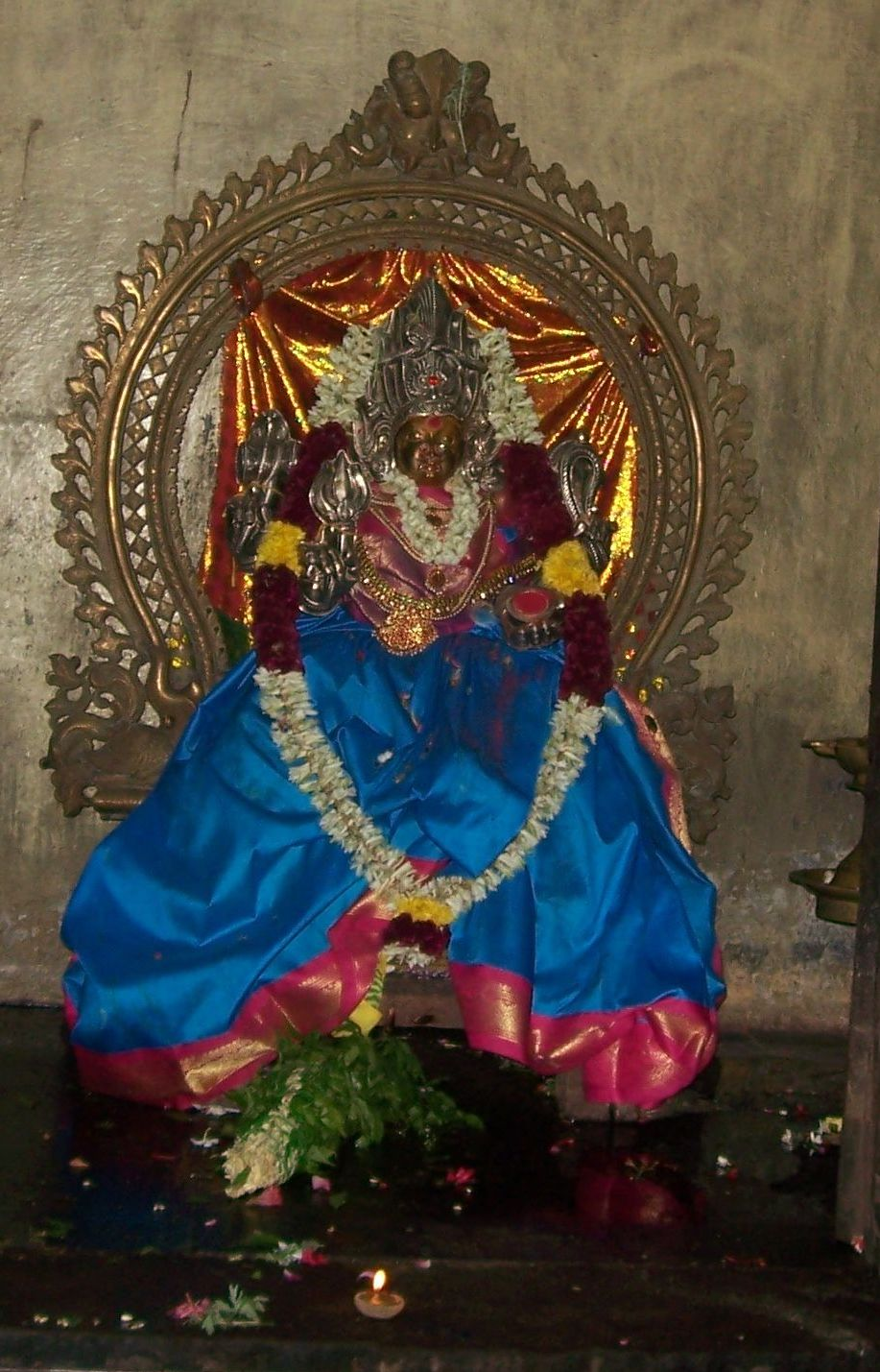
Festival image of Vekkali Amman

The roof over the sanctum was constructed during different times, but is believed to be burnt by the power of Vekkali Amman. The position of the leg of Vekkali Amman is different from other Shakti temples without roof where the right leg is placed over demon. As per Hindu legend, the position requires lot of energy and while Nataraja, during his dance switched his legs, Vekkali Amman remained in the position to show her energy levels. The posture is also believed to signify kindness, love, affection and compassion to her devotees. Historically, temples facing north, are considered to provide victories on endeavours. The Cholas worshipped the deity before proceeding to military campaign. The people of Woraiyur see Vekkali Amman as the saviour deity during difficult times.

== Festivals ==
Chittirai festival held during April–May, Panguni Poochoridal in March–April, Mango ablution on the last Friday of Tamil month of Vaikasi (May–June), Navarathri in Purattasi (September–October), Thai Velli (Fridays of January–February) and Aadi Velli (Fridays of July–August) are the festivals celebrated in the temple.
