= Panchavarnaswamy Temple =

Panchavarnaswamy Temple (Ancient Tamil Temple)
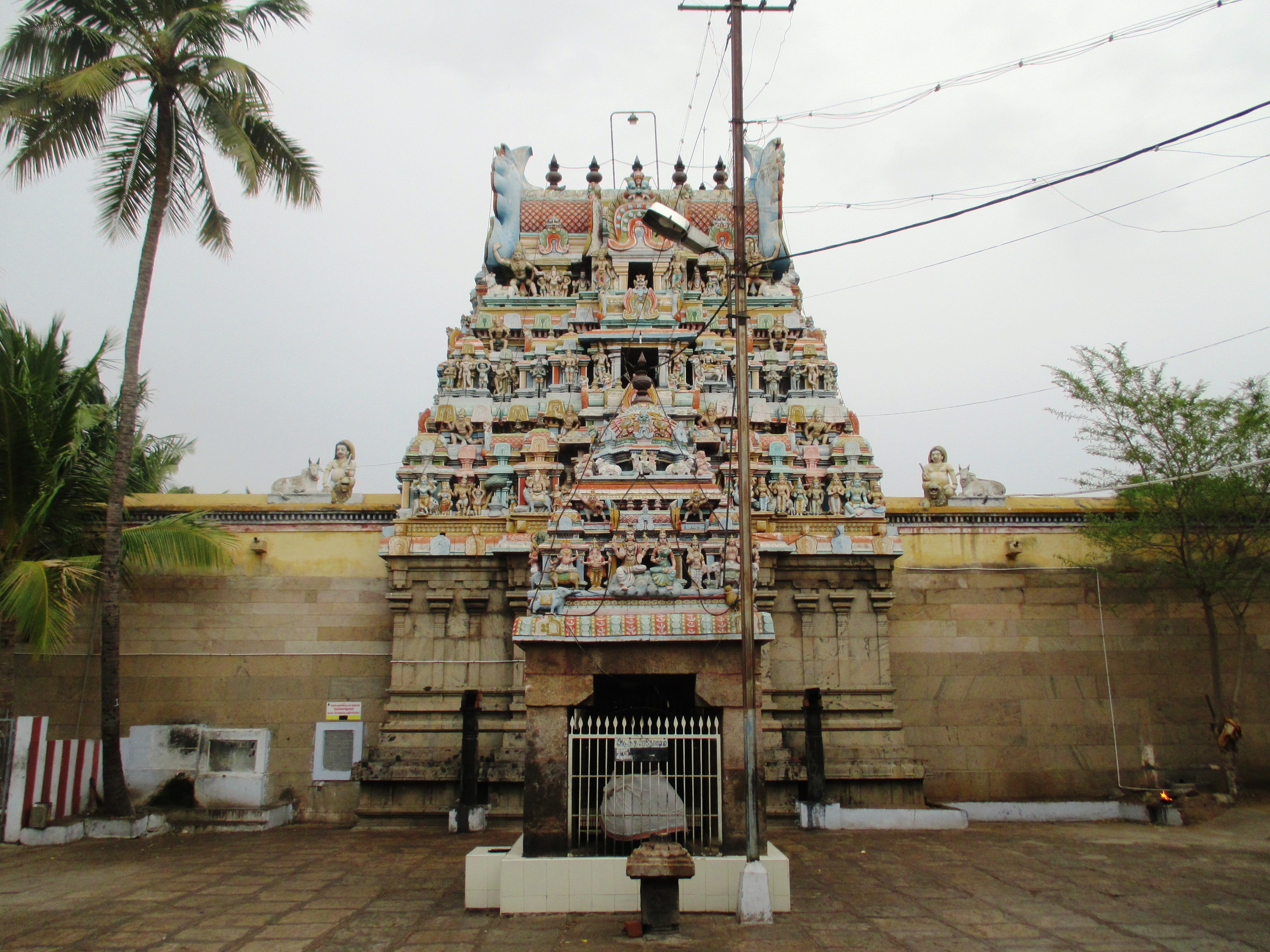

- Location in Tamil Nadu

Religion
- Affiliation: Hinduism
- District: Tiruchirapalli
- Deity: Panchavarnaswamy (Shiva)

Location
- Location: Woraiyur
- State: Tamil Nadu
- Country: India
- Coordinates: 10°22′N 78°51′E

Architecture
- Type: Dravidian architecture

Panchavarnaswamy Temple (usually Panjavarnaswamy Temple) is a Tamil temple dedicated to Shiva in Woraiyur, a neighborhood in the town of Tiruchirapalli in Tamil Nadu, India. Shiva is believed to portray five different colours, giving the name of the presiding deity, Panchavarnaswamy. Panchavarnaswamy is mentioned in the 7th century Tamil Saiva canonical work, the Tevaram, written by Tamil saint poets known as the tri-nayanars (Sambandar, Thirunavukkarasar, Sundar) (சம்பந்தர், திருநாவுக்கரசர், சுந்தரர், and classified as Paadal Petra Sthalam.

It has several inscriptions dating back to the Chola period. The temple is maintained and administered by the Tamil Nadu Religious and Charitable Endowments Department of the Government of Tamil Nadu.

== Etymology and legend ==
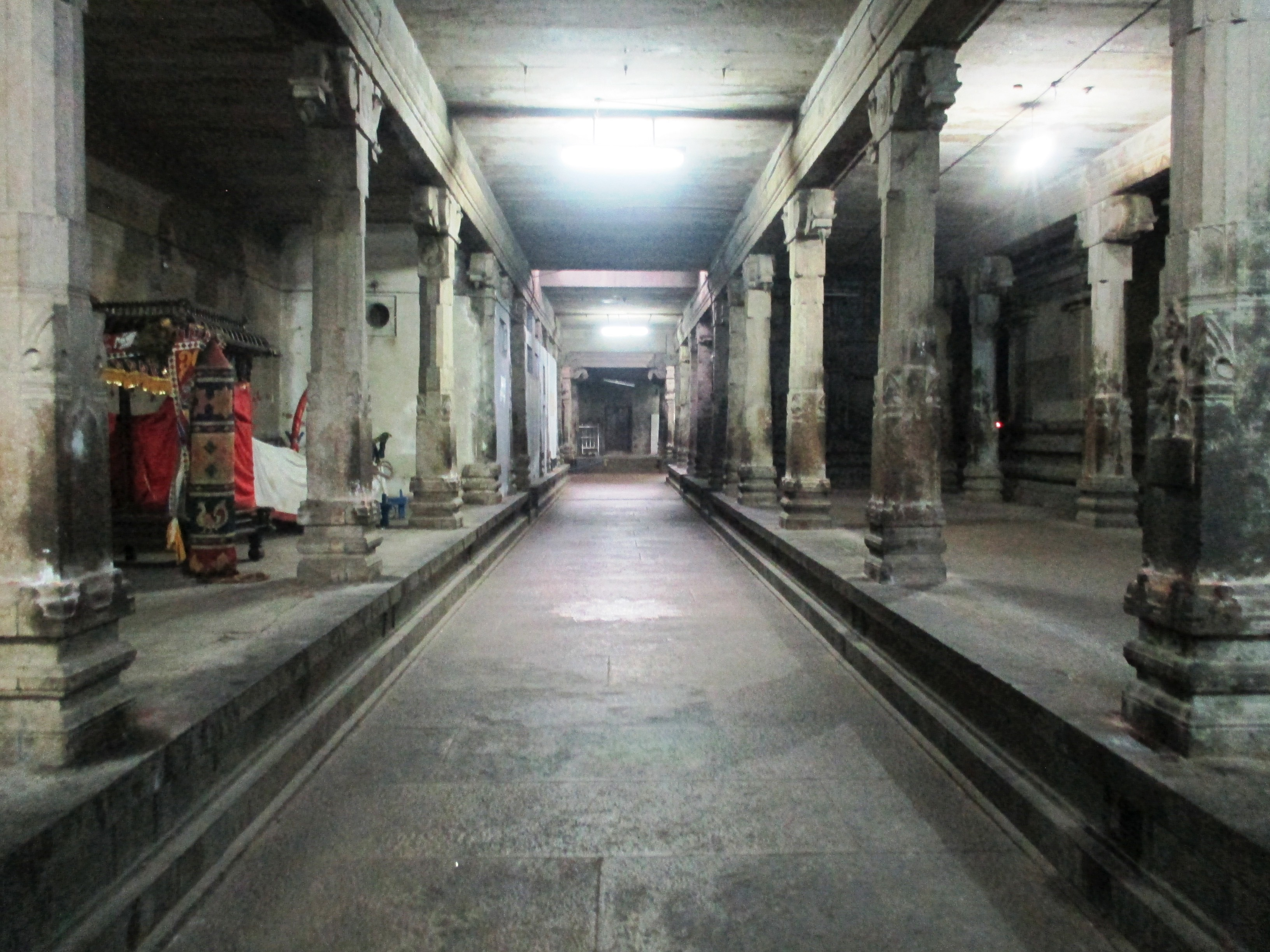
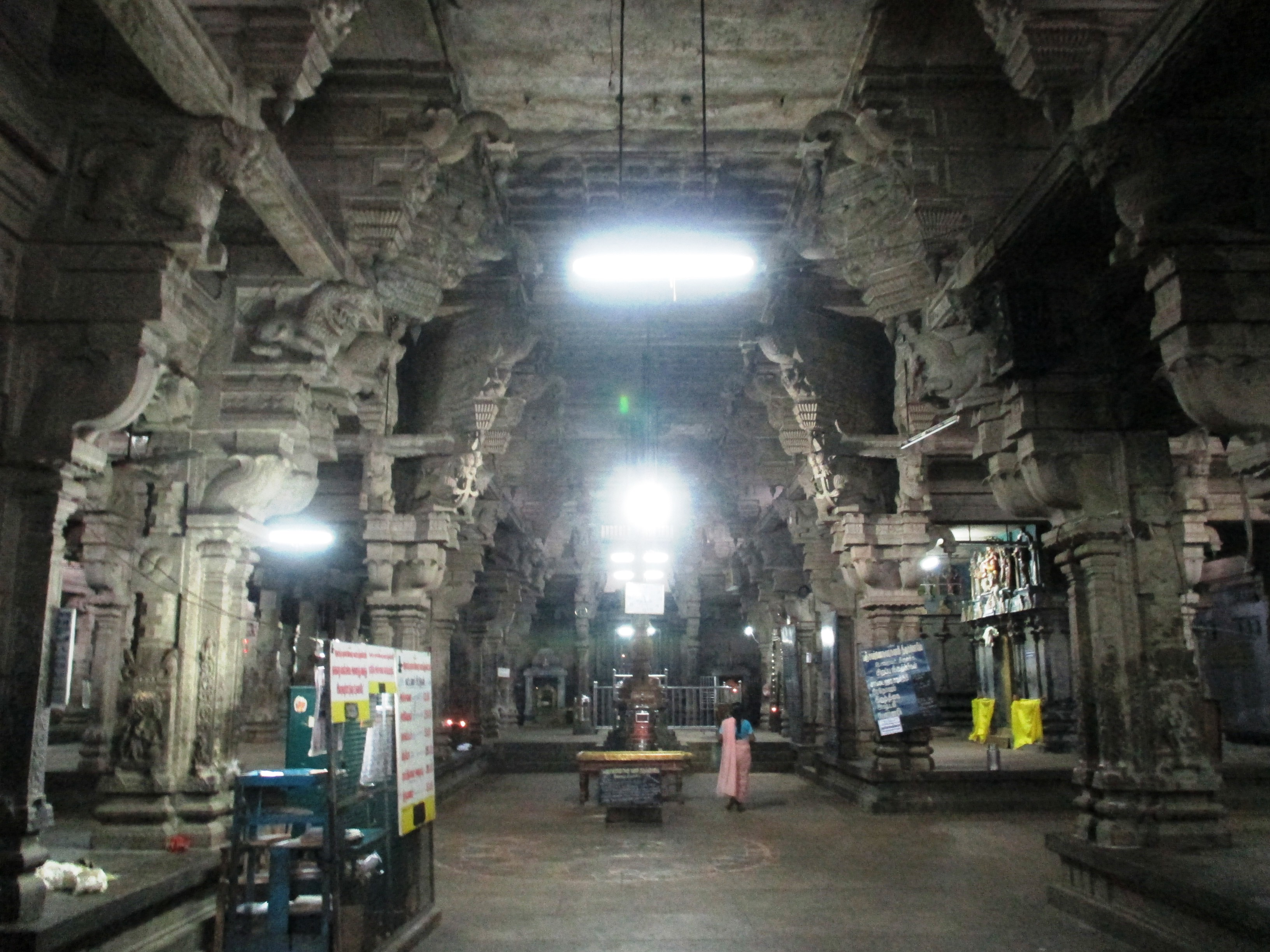
Halls in the temple with sculpted pillars

The place is called Uraiyur or Tirumukkeswaram, was once the capital of Chola kings as noted to Greek traveller Ptolemy. Panchavarnaswamy, the presiding deity of the temple, derives its name from the word panchavarnam, meaning five colours. As per Hindu legend, Shiva is believed to have appeared for sage Udanga in five different colours in five parts of the day. The temple is also called as "Tirumukeechwaram"(திருமூக்கீச்சரம்) or "Kozhi". The 7th century Saiva canonical work Tevaram by Tirugnanasambandar mentions the place as "Tirumukeechwaram".

As per Hindu legend, Shiva is believed to have appeared in five different colours and hence the presiding deity came to be known as Panchavarneswarar ("Lord of five colours"). Nagaraja, the serpent king was carrying the images of five different Lingams, which all got merged into one as the presiding deity at this temple. The temple is believed to have been worshipped by Garuda, sage Kathiru and wife of sage Kashyapa.

== Architecture ==
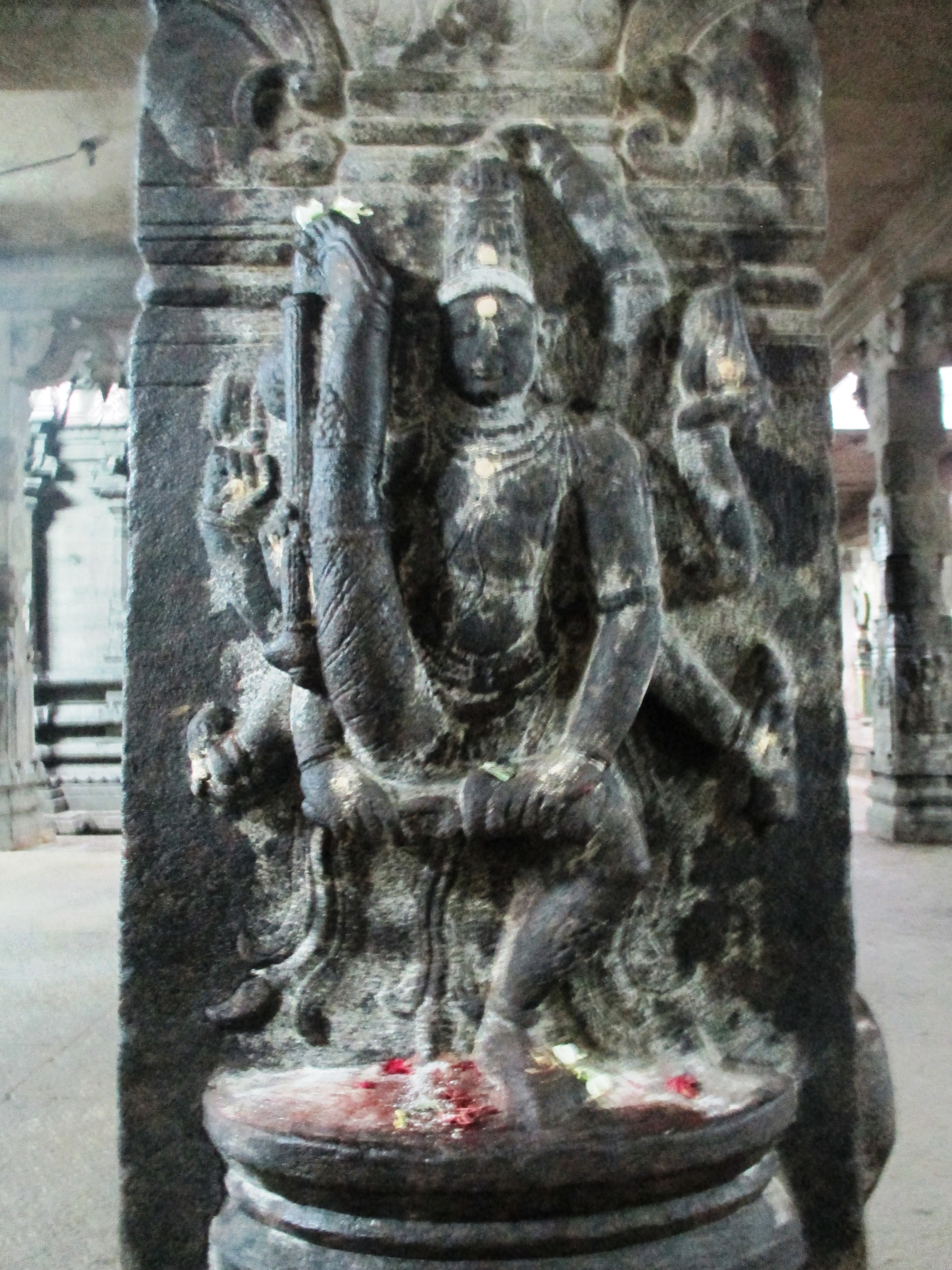
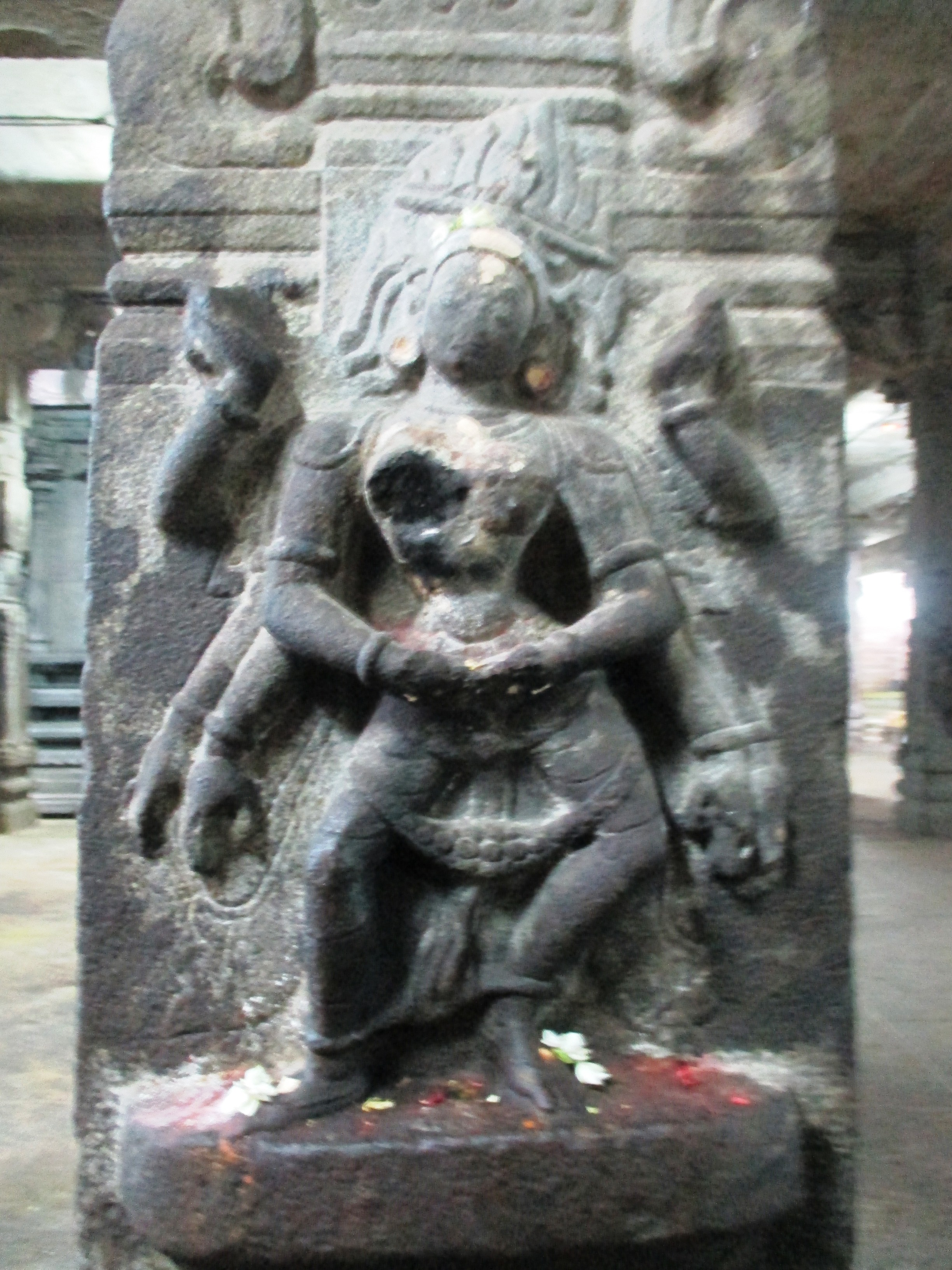
Sculptures in the temple

Panchavarnaswamy temple complex has three prakarams (outer courtyard) and a five-tiered rajagopuram (gateway tower). The central shrine faces east and holds the image of Panchavarnaswamy (Shiva) in the form of lingam made of granite. The granite images of the deities Ganesha (son of Shiva and god of wisdom), Murugan (son of Shiva and god of war), Nandi (the bull and transport of Shiva) and Navagraha (nine planetary deities) are located in the hall leading to the sanctum. As in other Shiva temples of Tamil Nadu, the first precinct or the walls around the sanctum of Panchavarnaswamy has images of Dakshinamurthy (Shiva as the Teacher), Durga (warrior-goddess) and Chandikeswarar (a saint and devotee of Shiva). The second precinct is surrounded by granite walls.

There are eight historical inscriptions in the temple, which are recorded by Epigraphy India as 181-188 of 1907. One of them dated the fourth year of a ruling Chola king records a gift of the village Atigunakapaganallur to the maintenance of the temple. The historical introduction of Chola king Rajendra Chola I can be traced in the inscription. Another inscription on the north wall of the presiding deity during the seventh year of Raja Raja Chola I mentions Rajasraya-Chaturvedimangalam in Uraiyur-kurram, a subdivision in Keralankata-Valanadu. The temple is mentioned as Udaiyar tiurndaitalai Mahadeva at Tiru-uraiyur.

The epigraph 51 of 1890 on a rock called Cholamparai near Uraiyur, mentions a record of Tribhuvanachakravartin Tribhuvanavira-Vikramadeva.

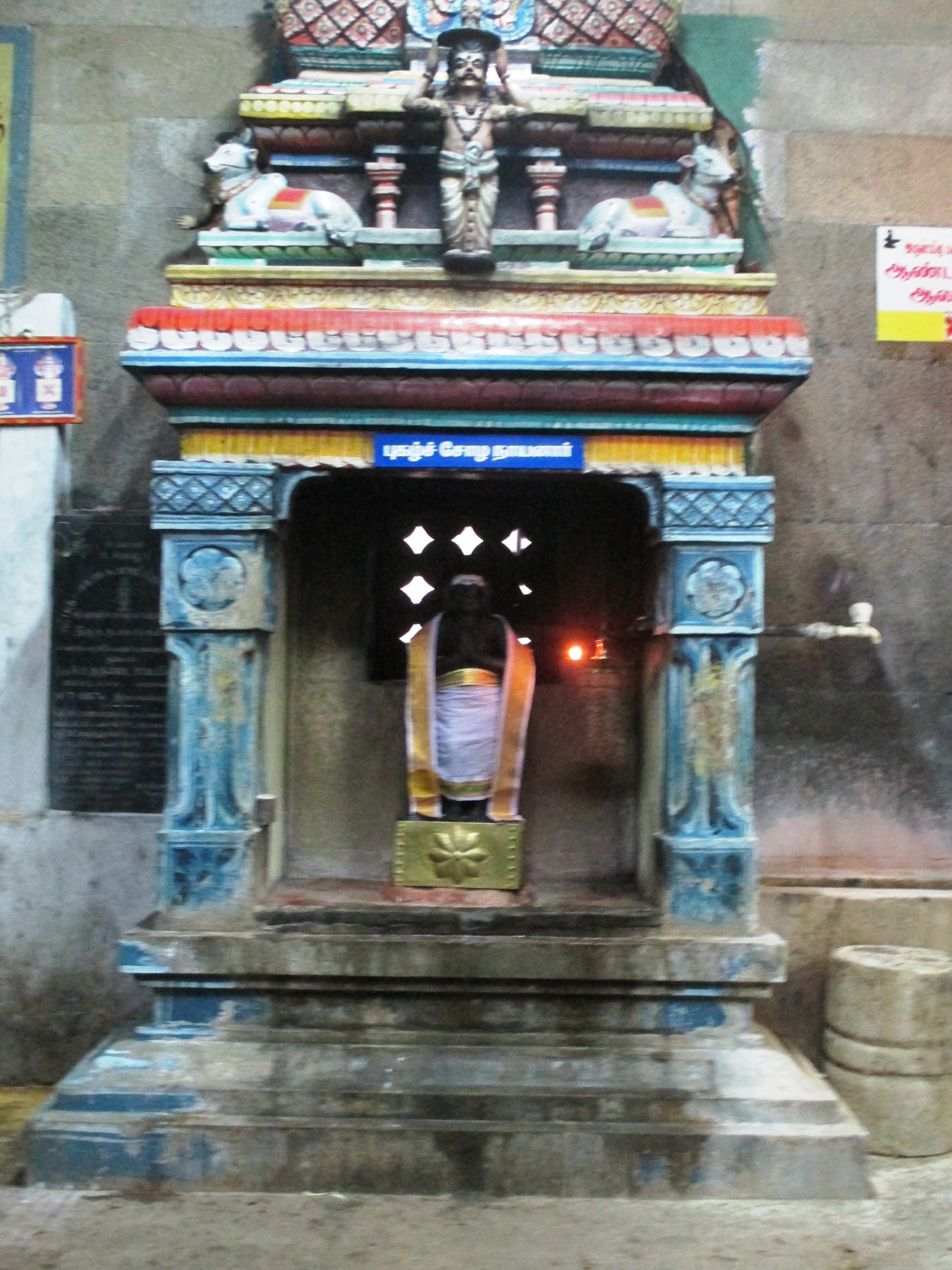
Pugazh Chola Nayanar, associated with the temple has a shrine dedicated to him

The temple is on the banks of River Kaveri. The presiding deity is mentioned in the 7th century Tamil Saiva canonical work, the Tevaram.
