= Eripatha Nayanar =

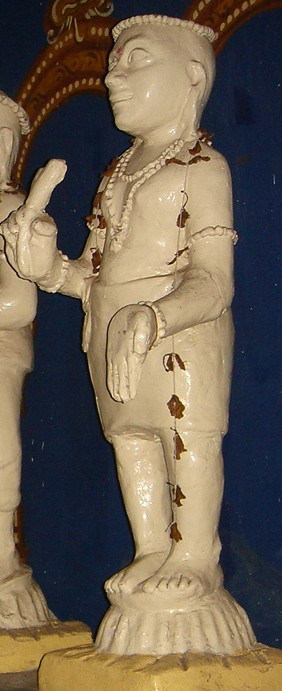

Personal life
- Born: Karur
- Honors: Nayanar saint

Religious life
- Religion: Hinduism
- Philosophy: Shaivism, Bhakti

Eripatha Nayanar, also known as Eripathar, Eripatar, Eribattar, Eripattan, Eripaththa Nayanar and Eripattha Nayanar, is Nayanar saint, venerated in the Hindu sect of Shaivism. He is generally counted as the eighth in the list of 63 Nayanars.Eripatha Nayanar worshipped Lord Pasupatheesvarar(Shiva) and devoted himself to serving and protecting Siva devotees. He carried an axe and used it against those who harmed them.

== Life ==
The life of Eripatha Nayanar is described in the Periya Puranam by Sekkizhar (12th century), which is a hagiography of the 63 Nayanars. Eripatha Nayanar belonged to Karuvur, generally identified as the Indian city of Karur, which is famous for its Pasupateeswarar temple dedicated to the patron god of Shaivism, Shiva. Karuvur was then one of the chief centres of the Chola kingdom. Pugal Chola, who is also venerated as Nayanar, ruled over the land. According to Vidya Dehejia, his historicity is "probable". He is one of the few Nayanars, whose caste is not mentioned in the Periya Puranam. The Nayanar worked in the Shiva temple of Karuvur.

Eripatha is said to be a devotee of Shiva and worshipped him daily at the shrine of Pasupateeswarar. He spent his time serving Shiva and his devotees. He always carried an axe with him for protection of the devotees of Shiva. He would punish any one who harmed the devotees by his axe. A devotee named Sivakami Andar had the habit of collecting fresh flowers in the morning for making garlands for Shiva's worship. Once on the day of Maha Navami, the royal elephant of the Chola was being paraded through the town. The elephant saw Sivakami Andar and seized the basket of flowers from his hands and crushed the flowers. The devotee pursued the elephant, but failed to keep pace due to his ripe age. While passing by, Eripatha saw the wailing devotee and chased the elephant to punish it. He caught up with the elephant and not only slew the beast, but also its mahout and accompanying guards who failed in their duty to control the elephant.

Eripatha trying to commit suicide and Pugal Chola protecting him.

The news of murder of the royal elephant reached Pugal Chola. The enraged king reached the spot of the massacre. While the king expected an army who challenged his authority, he saw a lone crusader standing over the elephant. Upon enquiry, the guards pointed to and introduced Eripatha as the slayer of the elephant. Pugal Chola alighted from his horse and bowed to the angry Eripatha in reverence and asked about the crime of his elephant and men. Eripatha informed him of the events leading to the killing and said that he had punished them for a sin against Shiva. The Chola felt it was his moral responsibility. He bent before the Nayanar and presenting his sword asked the Nayanar to kill him too, as the king is ultimately culpable for the actions of his elephant and army. Eripatha was taken aback by the king's devotion and actions and felt remorseful. He thought it would be best to commit suicide by the sword as penance for the murders. As Eripatha raised the sword to cut his head, the horrified king held his hands to stop him. As they struggled with the sword to sacrifice their lives, Shiva appeared pleased with their devotion and blessed them. He also resurrected the elephant and the king's men. Sivakami Andar's basket was also restored with flowers. Eripatha was given the honour of seating on the royal elephant, while the king held the royal umbrella over his head, like a slave. Both of them went to the Pasupateeswarar temple and worshipped Shiva. After death, Eripatha is said to have attained Kailash, Shiva's abode and became the leader of his ganas (attendants).

== Remembrance ==
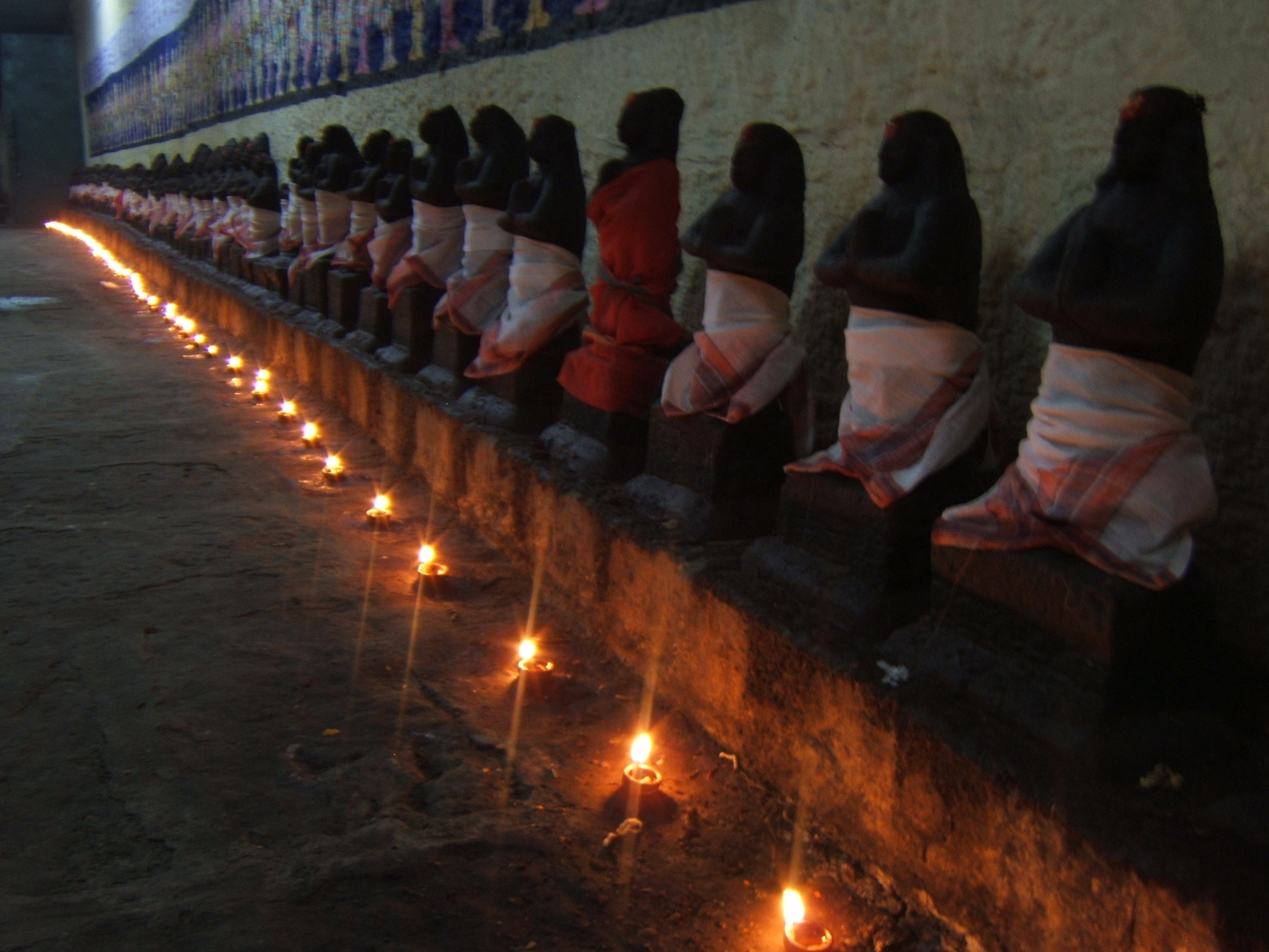
The images of the Nayanars are found in many Shiva temples in Tamil Nadu.

Eripatha Nayanar is depicted with a shaven head, with folded hands (see Anjali mudra) and with an axe (parashu) in crook of his hand. A holy day in his honour is observed on the fifteenth day of the Tamil month of Masi, generally coincides with 27 February. He receives collective worship as part of the 63 Nayanars. Their icons and brief accounts of his deeds are found in many Shiva temples in Tamil Nadu. Their images are taken out in procession in festivals.

One of the most prominent Nayanars, Sundarar (8th century) mentions Eripatha Nayanar (called Prince Eripattan here and is described to have bear a spear) in hymn to various Nayanar saints.
