= Uraiyur =

Part of Tiruchirapalli city in Tamil Nadu, India

Woraiyur Woraiyur Urayur
- Neighbourhood
- Nickname: Capital of Trichy
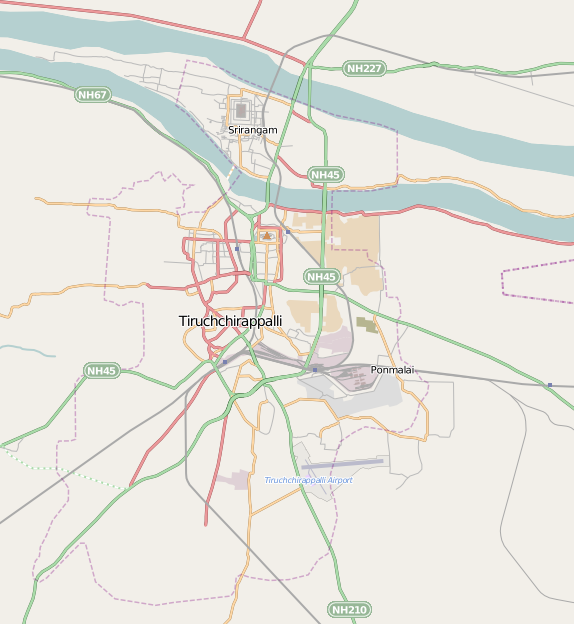
- Location within Tiruchirapalli Location within Tamil Nadu Location within India
- Coordinates: 10.8308°N 78.6799°E
- Country: India
- State: Tamil Nadu
- Elevation: 316.9 ft (96.58 m)
- Time zone: UTC+5.30 (IST)

Uraiyur (also spelt Woraiyur) is a locality in Tiruchirappalli, Tamil Nadu, India. Uraiyur was historically the ancient name of Tiruchirappalli City. Now, it has become one of the major commercial centers within in the modern city. It was historically the capital of the early Cholas, one of the four main dynasties of the ancient Tamil country. Sometimes spelled Urayur, this site is also known in various traditional Tamil lietrature as Thirukkozhi, Nikalaapuri, Uranthai, and Kozhiyur or Koliyur.

Evidence of Uraiyur's antiquity comes from the inscriptions of the Mauryan Emperor Ashoka (r. c. 268–232 BCE), which explicitly mention the Cholas, and date their capital to 272–232 BCE. While Ashokan inscriptions refer to the Cholas as an independent southern kingdom, Tamil Sangam literature identifies Uraiyur directly as the royal seat of early Chola rulers, Including Karikala Cholan. The Jain scholar, Samantabhadra, was born in Uraiyur in the late 2^{nd} century CE. His notable works include Ratnakarandaka Shravakachara, Aaptamimamsa and Swambhu Stotra.

== History ==
Prior to the 1st century CE, Uraiyur was the capital of Chola King Karikala. The city remained an important regional center until 850 CE when Vijayalaya Chola revived Chola power. The Cholas were one of the four major Tamil dynasties, the other three being the Pallavas, Cheras and Pandyas. During their peak, the Cholas ruled almost all of southern India, the Konkan coast, and the Deccan Plateau. Extending their empire beyond the Narmada, they gradually pushed northwards as far as the Ganges–Damodar delta.

The word Uraiyur literally means "the residence" in Tamil. It was an ancient city fortified with walls along the south bank of the Kaveri River. Following centuries of decline during which the pallavas dominated the region, the revived Imperial Cholas established Thanjavur as their capital in the 9th century CE. Uraiyur eventually lost its significance as an administrative center when the later Imperial Chola rulers decided to make Thanjavur their capital. During the Sangam Period, this city was also known as Koḻi, or "rooster", after the bird that was said to have frightened off a war elephant. According to the legend, the king was so impressed with the rooster's courage that he attributed it to the local soil and chose the spot for his city. This legend is depicted on square Chola copper coins dated to the 1st century BCE, as well as in the Purananuru.

== Temples ==
Several notable temples are situated here:

- Panchavarnaswamy Temple
- Sri Azhagiya Manavala Perumal Temple
- Vekkali Amman Temple
- Thanthoneeswarar Temple
