= Nataraja Temple, Chidambaram =

Hindu temple of Shiva in Tamil Nadu, India

Thillai Nataraja Temple
- Chidambaram Nataraja Temple
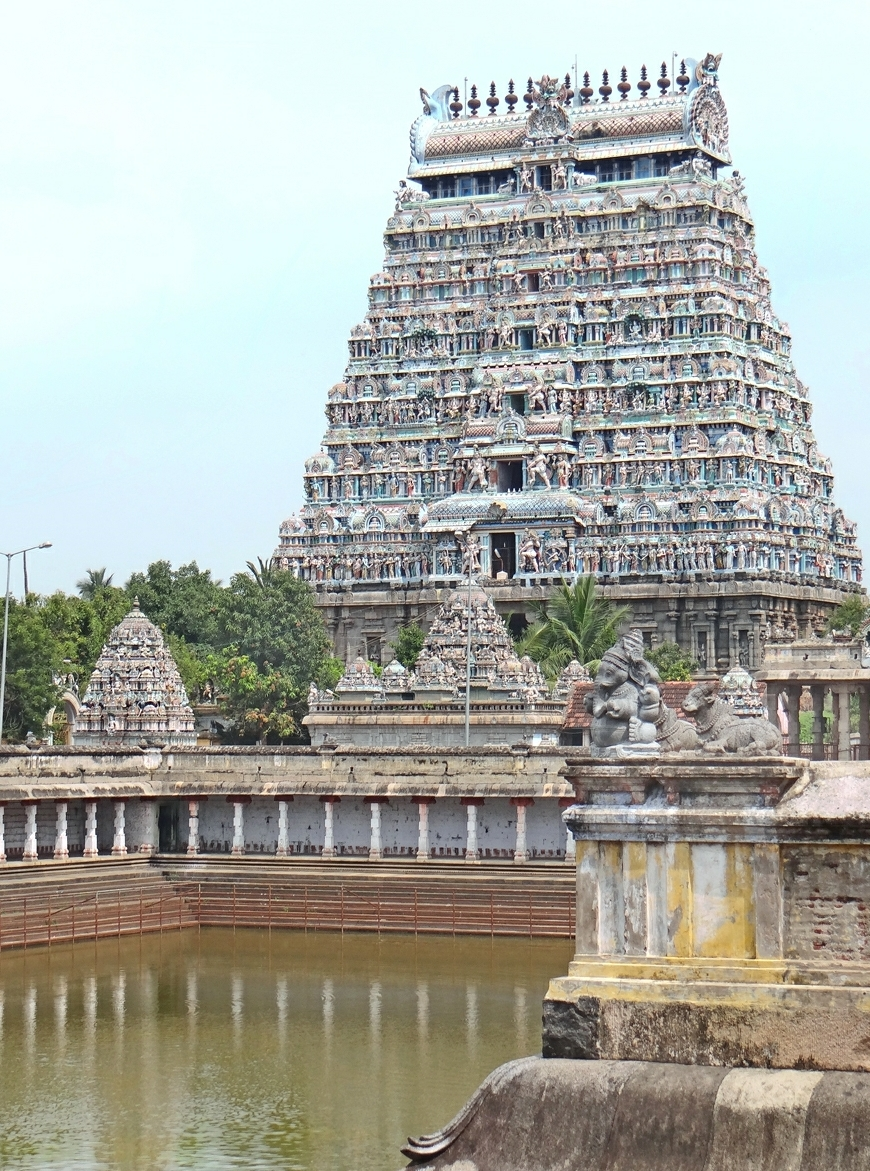
- A view of north-side gopuram and pond of the temple

Religion
- Affiliation: Hinduism
- District: Cuddalore District
- Deity: Nataraja (Shiva)

Location
- Location: Chidambaram
- State: Tamil Nadu
- Country: India
- Interactive map of Thillai Nataraja Temple
- Coordinates: 11°23′58″N 79°41′36″E

Architecture
- Type: Chola architecture
- Creator: Cholas, Pandyas
- Inscriptions: Tamil

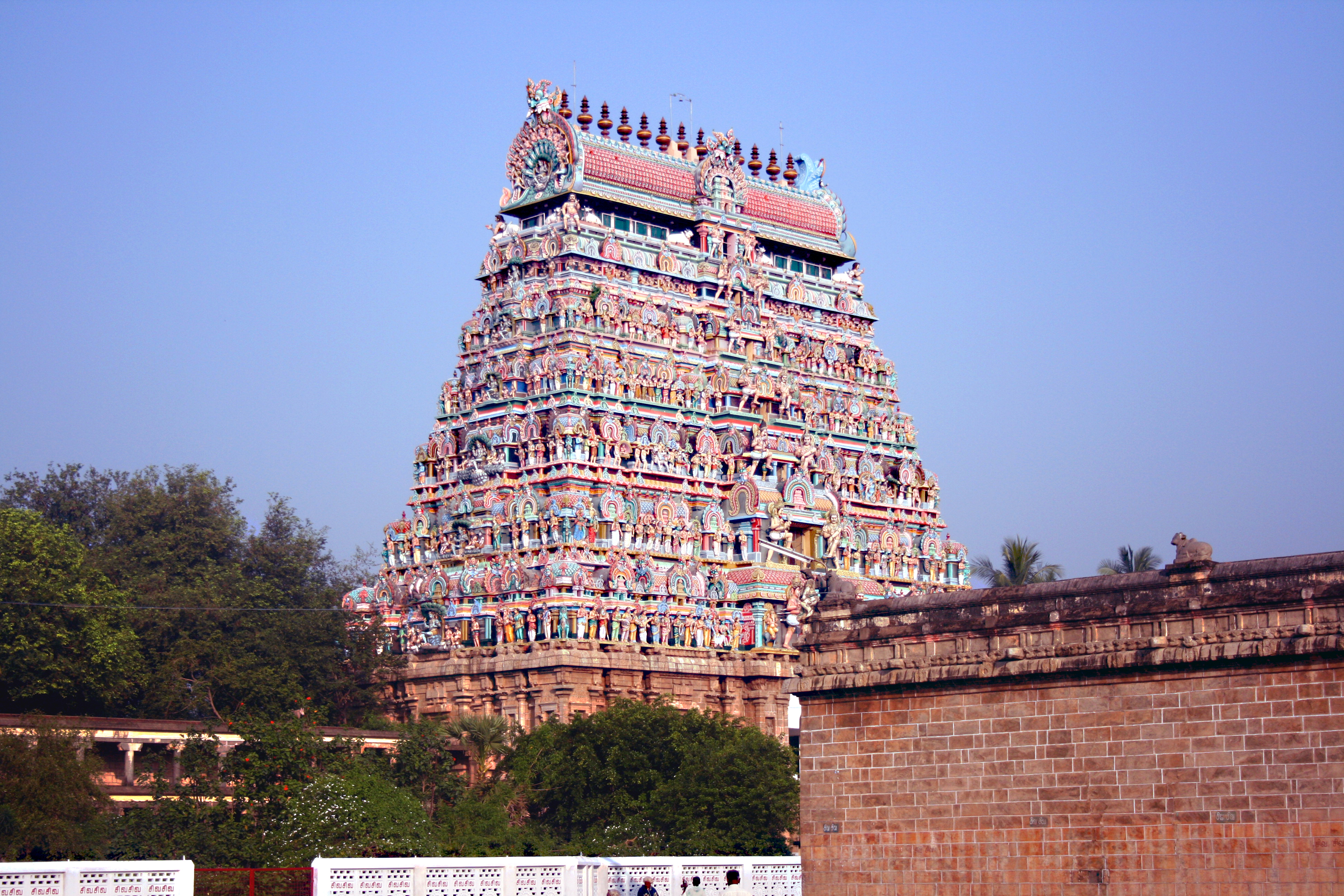
The main gopuram of Chidambaram Natarajar temple

Thillai Nataraja Temple, also referred as the Chidambaram Nataraja Temple, is a Hindu temple dedicated to Nataraja, the form of Shiva as the lord of dance (cosmic dancer). This temple is located in Chidambaram, Tamil Nadu, India. This temple has ancient roots and a Shiva shrine existed at the site when the town was known as Thillai. Chidambaram, the name of the city literally means "stage of consciousness". The temple is commonly called "Kovil" (The Temple) in Tamil Shaivism Tradition. The architecture symbolizes the connection between the arts and spirituality, creative activity and the divine. The temple wall carvings display all the 108 karanas from the Natya Shastra by Bharata Muni, and these postures form a foundation of Bharatanatyam, an Indian classical dance. it is the only Shiva temple common to both the Pancha Sabha Thalam and the Pancha Bhuta Thalam.

The present temple was renovated into current form in the 10th century when Chidambaram was one of the main cities of Chola dynasty. As per the Thiruvalangadu Copper plate and Thiruvilandur Copper plate inscriptions, the Golden roof of the shrine was constructed by Parantaka Chola I during 9th CE. (Note: According to the Thiruvilandur Copper Plate by T. S. Sridhar, Parantaka’s claim of gilding the Chidambaram temple may have involved restoring or enhancing an earlier golden roof. Appar (6th–7th century) and Tirumangai Alvar (mid-8th century) had already described the temple as having a golden structure. Parantaka may therefore have restored the existing golden vimana or added significant new elements to it.) The temple is mentioned in 7th CE Thevaram and Thiruvasagam Hymns making it older than Medieval Cholas. Cholas revered Nataraja as their family deity, as per Periyapuranam Cholas got crowned in this temple. This temple has been damaged, repaired, renovated and expanded through the 2nd millennium. Most of the temple's surviving plan, architecture and structure is from the late 12th and early 13th centuries, with later additions in similar style. While Shiva as Nataraja is the primary deity of the temple, it reverentially presents major themes from Shaktism, Vaishnavism, and other traditions of Hinduism. The Chidambaram temple complex, for example, has the earliest known Amman or Devi temple in South India, a pre-13th-century Surya shrine with chariot, shrines for Ganesha, Murugan and Vishnu, one of the earliest known Shiva Ganga sacred pools, large mandapas for the convenience of pilgrims (choultry, ambalam or sabha) and other monuments. Shiva himself is presented as the Nataraja performing the Ananda Tandava ("Dance of Delight") in the golden hall of the shrine Pon Ambalam.

The temple is one of the five elemental lingas in the Shaivism pilgrimage tradition, and considered the subtlest of all Shiva temples (Kovil) in Hinduism. It is also a site for performance arts, including the annual Natyanjali dance festival on Maha Shivaratri.

== Etymology ==
Chidambaram is one of the many temple towns in the state which is named after the groves, clusters or forests dominated by a particular variety of a tree or shrub and the same variety of tree or shrub sheltering the presiding deity. The town used to be called Thillai, following Thillaivanam, derived from the mangrove of Tillai trees (Excoecaria agallocha) that grow here and the nearby Pichavaram wetlands.

The word Chidambaram comes from the Tamil word Chitrambalam (also spelled Chithambalam) meaning "wisdom atmosphere". The roots are citt or chitthu means "consciousness or wisdom", while ampalam means "atmosphere". This composite word comes from its association with Shiva Nataraja, the cosmic dancer and the cultural atmosphere for arts. The word Chidambaram is translated by James Lochtefeld as "clothed in thought".

The town and temple name appears in medieval Hindu texts by various additional names such as Kovil (lit. "the temple"), Pundarikapuram, Vyagrapuram, Sirrampuram, Puliyur and Chitrakuta. Additional names for Chidambaram in Pallava era and North Indian texts include Kanagasabainathar, Ponnambalam, Brahmastpuri and Brahmapuri.

== Location ==
The Nataraja temple in Chidambaram is located in the southeastern Indian state of Tamil Nadu. It is about 5 kilometres (3.1 mi) north of the Kollidam River (Kaveri), 15 kilometres (9.3 mi) west from the coast of Bay of Bengal, and 220 kilometres (140 mi) south of Chennai. The closest major airport is about 60 kilometres (37 mi) north in Pondicherry (IATA: PNY). The National Highway 32 (old numbering: NH-45A) passes through Chidambaram. The Tamil Nadu State Transport Corporation and private companies operate services connecting it to major cities in the state. The site is linked to the Indian Railways with daily express trains to South Indian cities.

Chidambaram is a temple town, with the Nataraja complex spread over 16 hectares (40 acres) within a nearly square courtyard in the center. Its side roads are aligned to the east–west, north–south axis. It has double walls around its periphery with gardens. It has had entrance gateways on all four sides.

== History ==
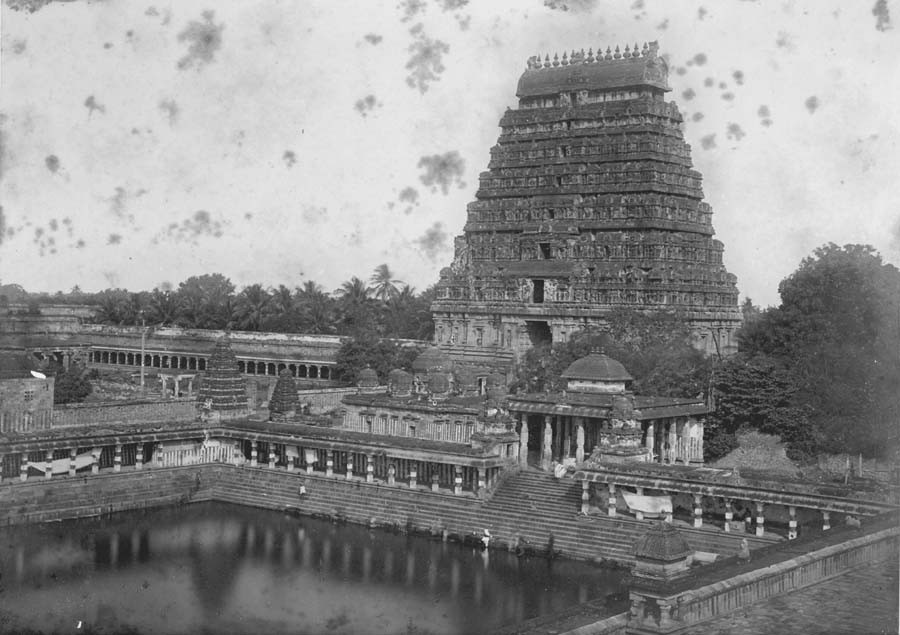
Sivaganga pool and gopuram, ca. 1800–1850.

The Nataraja temple has ancient roots, early textual evidence, such as those of the Sangam tradition, suggest a temple existed here along with Madurai in ancient times, but the town is not named Chidambaram in these pre-5th-century texts. The earliest mention of "dancing god of Chidambaram" as Shiva is found in 6th- and early-7th-century texts by Appar and Sambadar. The Suta Samhita embedded inside Sri Kanda Puranam and variously dated between 7th and 10th century mentions the Chidambaram dance. Likely following the temple architecture tradition that is found all over South India from at least the 5th century when many older brick and wooden temples were being replaced by more lasting temples from cut stone as the building blocks in dozens of places across South India. The surviving Nataraja temple has a structure that is traceable to the early Chola Dynasty. Chidambaram was the early capital of this dynasty, and Shiva Nataraja was their family deity. The Chidambaram temple town remained important to the Cholas, albeit with increasing competition from other temple towns when Rajaraja Chola I moved the capital to Thanjavur, built a new city and the massive Brihadeeswarar Temple dedicated to Shiva in the early 11th century, which is now a world heritage site.

Nataraja Shiva and his "dance of bliss" is an ancient Hindu art concept. It is found in various texts such as Tatva Nidhi which describes seven types of dance and their spiritual symbolism, Kashyapa Silpa which describes 18 dance forms with iconographic details and design instructions, as well as Bharata's ancient treatise on performance arts Natya Shastra which describes 108 dance postures among other things. Reliefs and sculptures of Nataraja have been found across the Indian subcontinent, some dating to the 6th century and earlier such as in Aihole and Badami cave temples. (Note: Dance and performance arts are not unique to Shiva in Hindu texts, including the Tamil literature. Many other deities, including Vishnu, Durga, Krishna, Ganesha, Kartikeya are all envisioned as dancers amongst other things. However, with Shiva the idea is most evolved.)

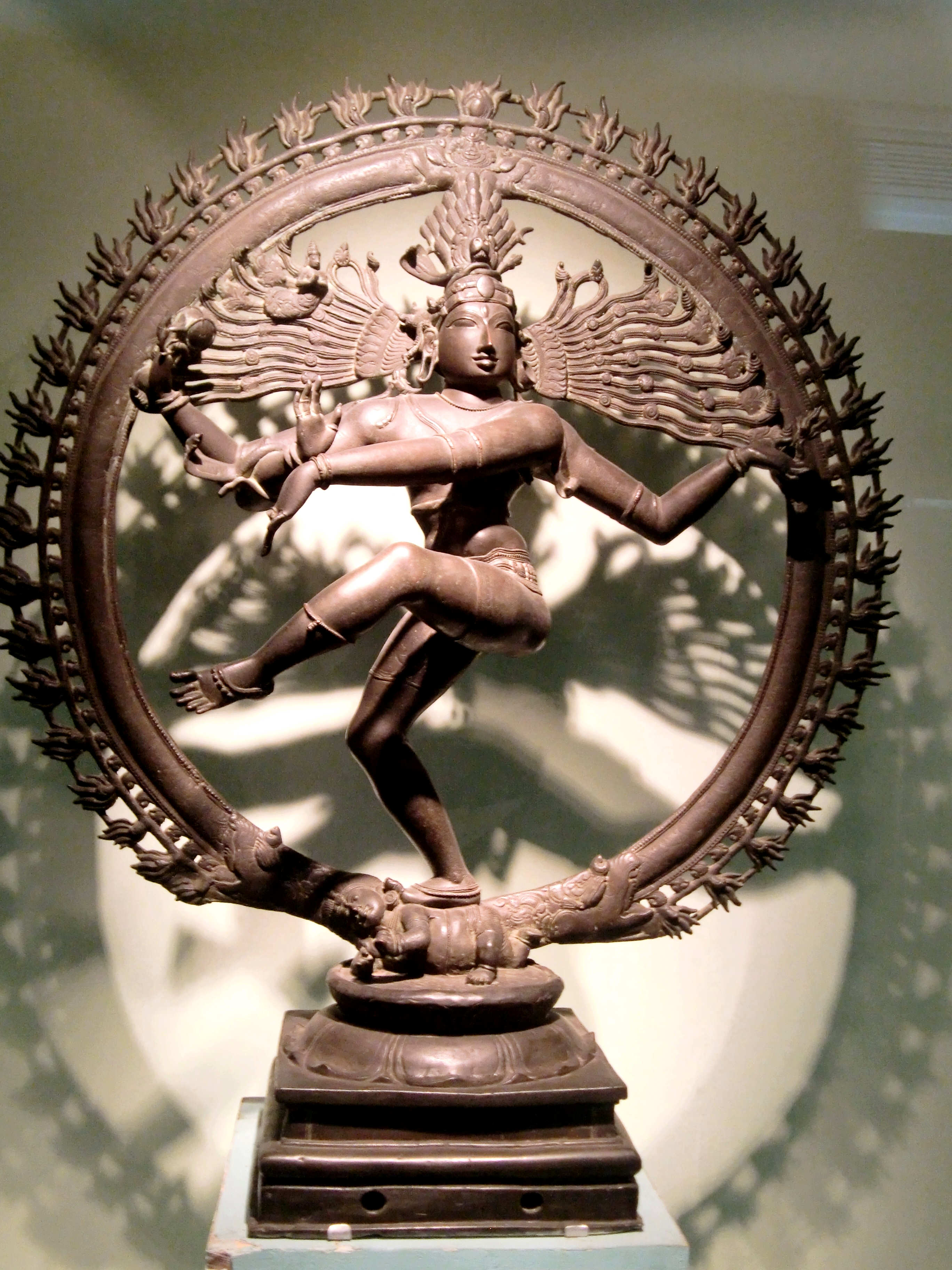
Nataraja – Shiva as the cosmic dancer, inspired the 10th-century Chola kings to rebuild the Chidambaram temple with stone and gold. A silver Nataraja, not Shivalinga, is the principal icon in this temple.

The earliest historically verifiable Shiva temple at Chidambaram is traceable in inscriptions that date to the rule of Aditya Chola I in the early 10th century, and far more during the rule of the 10th-century Chola king Parantaka Chola I. (Note: Sharada Srinivasan states that the Nataraja bronze has roots in 7th- to 9th-century Pallava innovations.) For them, the dancing Shiva was the kula-nayaka (family guide or deity) and Chidambaram was the capital they built. These inscriptions and texts from this period suggest that the significance of the Agama texts and Shaiva Bhakti movement was strengthening within the Chola leadership and thought.

The copper plate inscriptions of Parantaka I (c. 907–955 CE) describe him as the "bee at the lotus feet of Shiva" who built the golden hall for Shiva, with Chit-sabha, Hema-sabha, Hiranya-sabha and Kanaka-sabha (all mandapam, pillared pilgrim rest places). He is referred to as "Pon veinda Perumal", which means "one who covered with gold" the Chit-sabha of Chidambaram. Both Aditya I and his Chola successor Parantaka I were active supporters of arts and temple building. They converted many older brick and wooden temples into more lasting temples from cut stone as the building blocks in dozens of places across South India.

Raja Raja Chola I (985–1013 CE) embarked on a mission to recover the hymns of the 63 Nayanmars after hearing short excerpts of the Tevaram in his court. He sought the help of Nambiyandar Nambi, who was a priest in a temple. It is believed that by divine intervention Nambi found the presence of scripts, in the form of cadijam leaves half eaten by white ants in a chamber inside the second precinct in the temple. The brahmanas (Dikshitars) in the temple are supposed to have disagreed with the king by saying that the works were too divine, and that only by the arrival of the "Naalvar" (the four saints)—Appar, Sundarar, Tirugnanasambandar and Manickavasagar would they allow for the chambers to be opened. Rajaraja, however, created idols of them and prepared for them to be brought to the temple through a procession. but Rajaraja is said to have prevailed. Rajaraja thus became known as Tirumurai Kanda Cholan meaning one who saved the Tirumurai.

In another version of the story, Rajaraja is said to have experienced a dream from lord Shiva telling Rajaraja that the hymns in Thillai Nataraja Temple, Chidambaram are in a state of destruction and to recover the remaining hymns from the chambers. The brahmanas (Dikshitars) in the temple, however, are supposed to have disagreed with the king by saying that the works were too divine to be accessed, and that only by the arrival of the 63 Nayanmars would they allow for the chambers to be opened. Rajaraja, devising a plan, consecrated idols of each of them and prepared for them to be brought into the temple through a procession. It is said that the 63 idols are still present in the Thillai Nataraja Temple. When the vault was opened, Rajaraja is said to have found the room infested with white ants, and that the hymns were salvaged as much as possible.

The temple, according to inscriptions found in South India and Southeast Asia, was also historic recipient of a precious jewel from the king of Angkor who built the Angkor Wat through Chola king Kulothunga, who submitted it to the temple in 1114 CE. Kulothunga I and his son expanded the Chidambaram Nataraja temple sixfold.

Chidambaram temple thrived during the Chola dynasty rule through mid-13th century, along with the later Shiva-based Thanjavur and Gangaikondacholapuram capitals, as well as Vishnu-based Srirangam temple towns. Its facilities infrastructure was expanded. Naralokaviran, the general of king Kulothunga Chola I was responsible for building the steps that lead to Sivaganga water pool, a goddess shrine, a shrine for child saint Thirugnana Sambanthar, temple gardens and a pilgrim road network in and around Chidambaram. He constructed a hall for recitation of Tevaram hymns and engraved the hymns in copper plates. The thousand pillar choultry, with friezes narrating Hindu texts, was built in the late 12th century. Between the second half of the 12th century and the early 13th century, the Chola kings added colorful and high gopura stone gateways as easily identifiable landmarks, starting with the western gopura. Thereafter, about mid 13th century, the Pandya dynasty ended the Chola dynasty. The Hindu Pandyas were liberal supporters of Chidambaram temple, along with other Shiva and Vishnu temples, just like the Chola. Sundara Pandya added the huge eastern gopura at Chidambaram, beginning the colossal gateway tradition. Most of the structure and plans currently seen in the Chidambaram complex, including the mandapas with their pillar carvings, the various shrines with polished granite sculptures, the sacred water pool and the early gopurams are from the 12th and 13th century, attributed to the late Chola and early Pandya kings.

=== Invasions ===
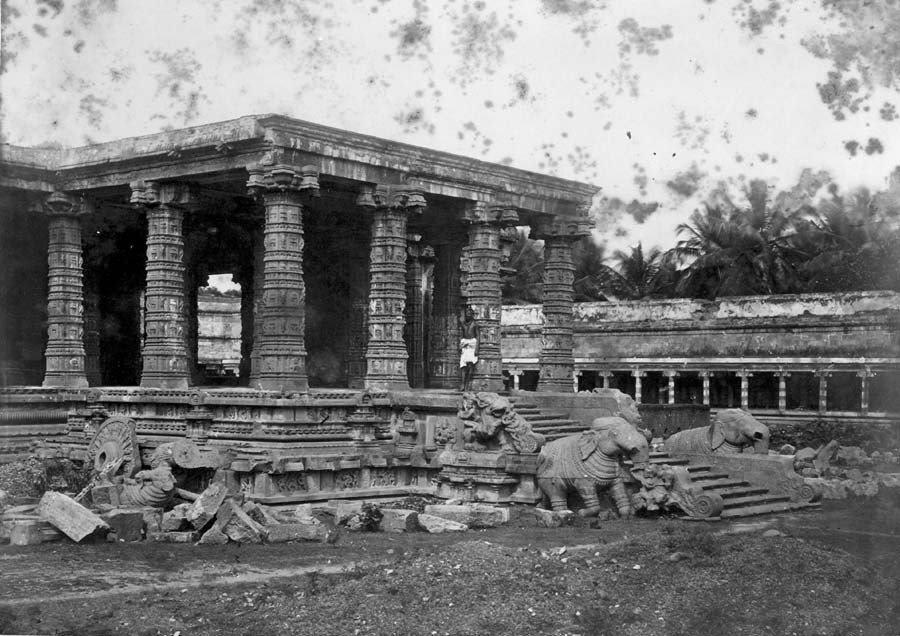
Subrahmanya shrine in ruins, early 19th century

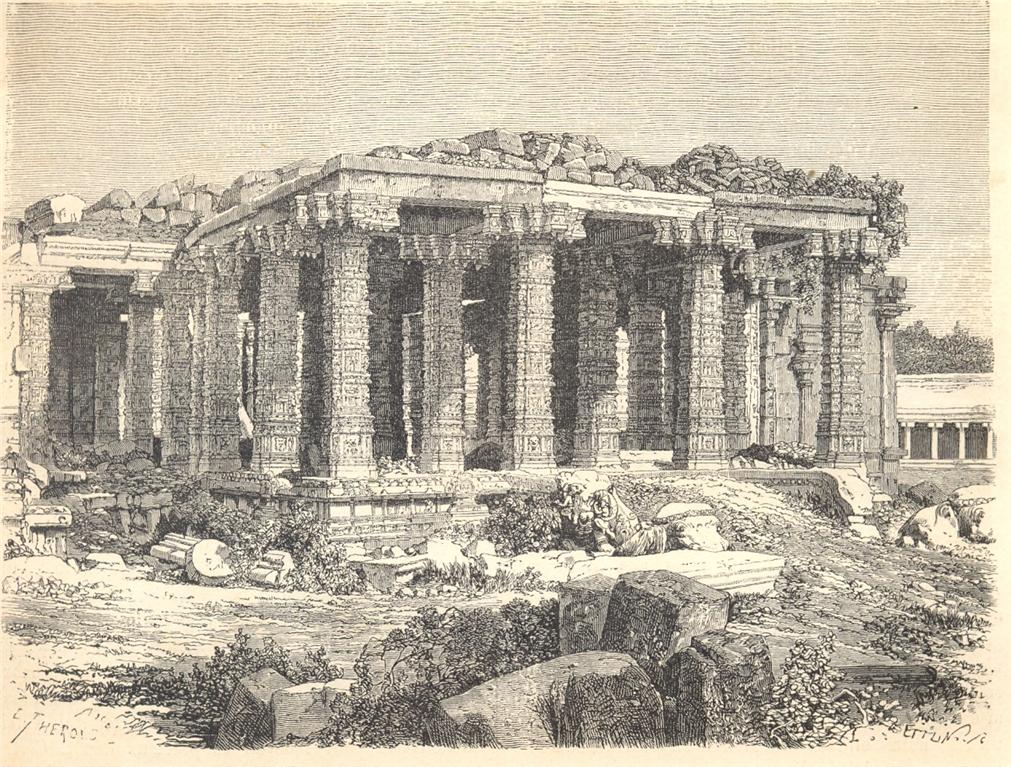
A Mandapam in 1869

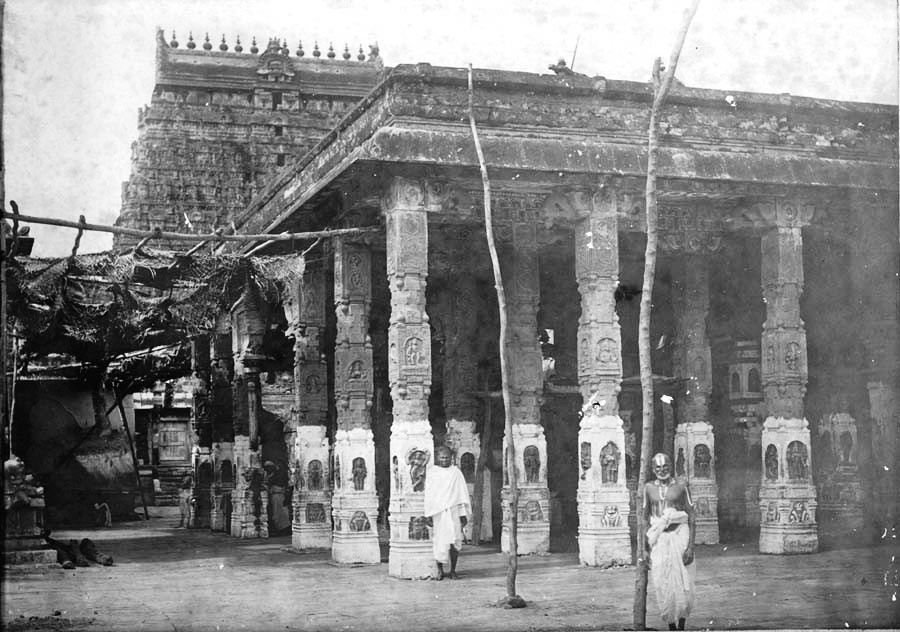
One of the temple's pillared halls before demolition in the late 19th century.

In the north, the Indian subcontinent had been conquered by the Delhi Sultanate. Muslim armies had begun raiding central India for plunder by the late 13th century. In 1311, when Sultan Alauddin Khilji ordered his general Malik Kafur and his forces to invade southern Hindu kingdoms, he went deeper into the Indian peninsula for loot and to establish annual tribute agreement between the kingdoms and the Sultanate. The records left by the court historians of the Delhi Sultanate state that Malik Kafur raided Chidambaram, Srirangam, Madurai and other Tamil towns, destroyed the temples, and the Nataraja temple was one of the sources of gold and jewels booty he brought back to Delhi.

The temple towns of Tamil Nadu were again targeted for loot in the 1320s. However, when the news of another invasion spread in Tamil lands, the community removed them into the Western Ghats or buried numerous sculptures and treasures in the land and concealed chambers underneath temples sites before the Muslim armies reached them. A large number of these were rediscovered in archaeological excavations at the site in and after 1979, including those in Chidambaram. According to Nagaswamy, those who buried the temple artworks followed the Hindu Agama texts such as Marici Samhita and Vimanarcanakalpa that recommend ritually burying precious metal murtis as a means of protection when war and robbery is imminent. Over 200 such items have been recovered, including relevant hordes of copper plate inscriptions.

The Islamic invasion in the 14th century, states George Michell – a professor and art historian of Indian architecture, brought an abrupt end to the patronage of Chidambaram and other temple towns. The Delhi Sultan appointed a Muslim governor, who seceded within the few years from the Delhi Sultanate and began the Madurai Sultanate. This Sultanate sought tribute from the temple towns, instead of supporting them. The Muslim Madurai Sultanate was relatively short lived, with Hindu Vijayanagara Empire removing it in the late 14th century. The Vijayanagara rulers restored, repaired and expanded the temple through the 16th century, along with many other regional temples. These kings themselves went on pilgrimage to Chidambaram, and gifted resources to strengthen its walls and infrastructure.

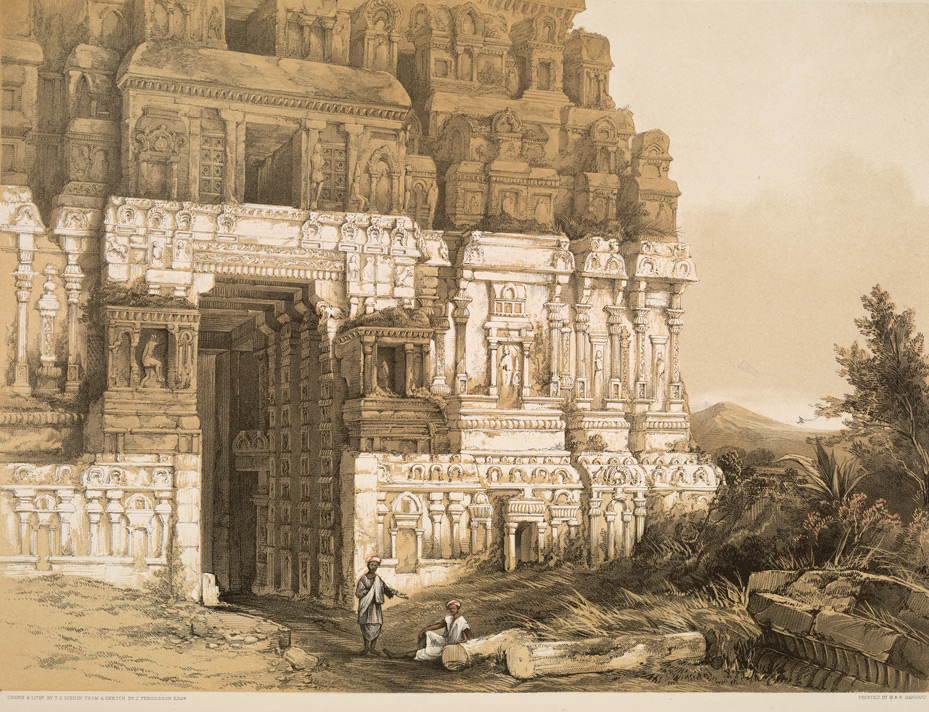
An 1847 sketch of gopuram with ruined pillars, published by James Fergusson

The decline and dissolution of the Vijayanagara Empire in the late 16th century by an alliance of Sultanates, followed within a few decades by entrance of Portuguese, French and British colonial interests brought geopolitical uncertainties to Chidambaram and other temple towns. The Portuguese were already a major Coromandel Coast trading group by the early 17th century, a region to which Chidambaram belonged. The Portuguese began building forts, garrison and churches in Coromandel Coast region after the demise of Vijayanagara, triggering the intervention of the French and the British. By the mid-17th century, the temple complex was within the patronage of Nayakas, who repaired the temple and repainted the frescoes on mandapa ceilings. According to Michell, these restorations likely occurred about 1643 CE during the reign of Shrirangadeva Raya III.

According to British reports, Chidambaram temple town had to bear the "brunt of several severe onslaughts" between the French and the British colonial forces several times particularly in the 18th century.

=== Legend ===
The Chidambaram temple legend is contained in the 12th-century text Chidambara-mahatmya. The central episode states that Shiva visits sages in the mythical forest in the form of a dancer mendicant (Bhikshatana) accompanied by Mohini, Vishnu in his avatar as a beautiful woman. Mohini triggers lustful interest of the sages, while Shiva performs Tandava dance that triggers the carnal interest of the wives of these sages. The sages ultimately realise how superficial their austerities have been. The episode becomes widely known. Two sages named Patanjali (also called Sesha-bodied in the south for his connection to Vishnu) and Vyaghrapada (also called Tiger-footed sage) want to see the repeat performance of this "dance of bliss" in the Thaillai forest, Chidambaram. They set up a Shivalinga, pray, meditate and wait. Their asceticism impresses Shiva who appeared before them in Chidambaram and performed "the dance" against "the wall, in the blessed hall of consciousness". This is how this temple started, according to the mahatmya embedded in the Tamil Sthalapurana. According to Kulke, the late medieval text Chidambaramahatmya may reflect a process of Sanskritisation, where these North Indian named sages with Vedic links became incorporated into regional temple mythology.

According to a Hindu legend, once Shiva and his consort Parvati wanted to judge who among them was a better dancer, and wanted their sons Ganesha and Murugan to judge their performances. Both of them judged in favour of Parvati, after which Shiva was not satisfied. He wanted Brahma to judge, and the competition was held in Thiruvalangadu. Brahma was still not satisfied, and he wanted Vishnu to judge, and the latter wanted the competition in Tillaivanam. Shiva performed the Urthvathandavam pose of picking his earring with his legs, and wearing them in the ear with his legs. Parvati was not able to perform the feat. Vishnu was Impressed and declared Shiva as the winner. Parvati got angry due to her frustration at her defeat, became Kali at the Thillai Kali temple.

According to another Hindu legend, Mahalingaswamy at Thiruvidaimarudur is the centre of all Shiva temples in the region and the Saptha Vigraha moorthis (seven prime deities in all Shiva temples) are located at seven cardinal points around the temple, located in various parts of the state. The seven deities are Nataraja in Chidambaram Nataraja Temple at Chidambaram, Chandikeswarar temple at Tirucheingalur, Ganesha in Vellai Vinayagar Temple at Thiruvalanchuzhi, Murugan in Swamimalai Murugan Temple at Swamimalai, Bhairava in Sattainathar Temple at Sirkali, Navagraha in Sooriyanar Temple at Suryanar Kovil, Dakshinamoorthy in Apatsahayesvarar Temple at Alangudi.

The temple, also called Perumpatrapuliyur in this context, is one of the Nava Puliyur Temples worshipped by Patanjali and Vyaghrapada. The other temples are Thirupathiripuliyur, Erukathampuliyur, Omampuliyur, Sirupuliyur, Atthippuliyur, Thaplampuliyur, Perumpuliyur and Kanattampuliyur.

== Description ==
Nataraja temple plan. 1: East gopura; 2: South gopura; 3: West gopura; 4: North gopura; 5: 1000 pillar hall (choultry); 6: Shivaganga pool; 7: Devi temple; 8: Shiva Sanctum + Chit Sabha + Kanaka Sabha; 9: Vishnu shrine.

=== Architecture ===
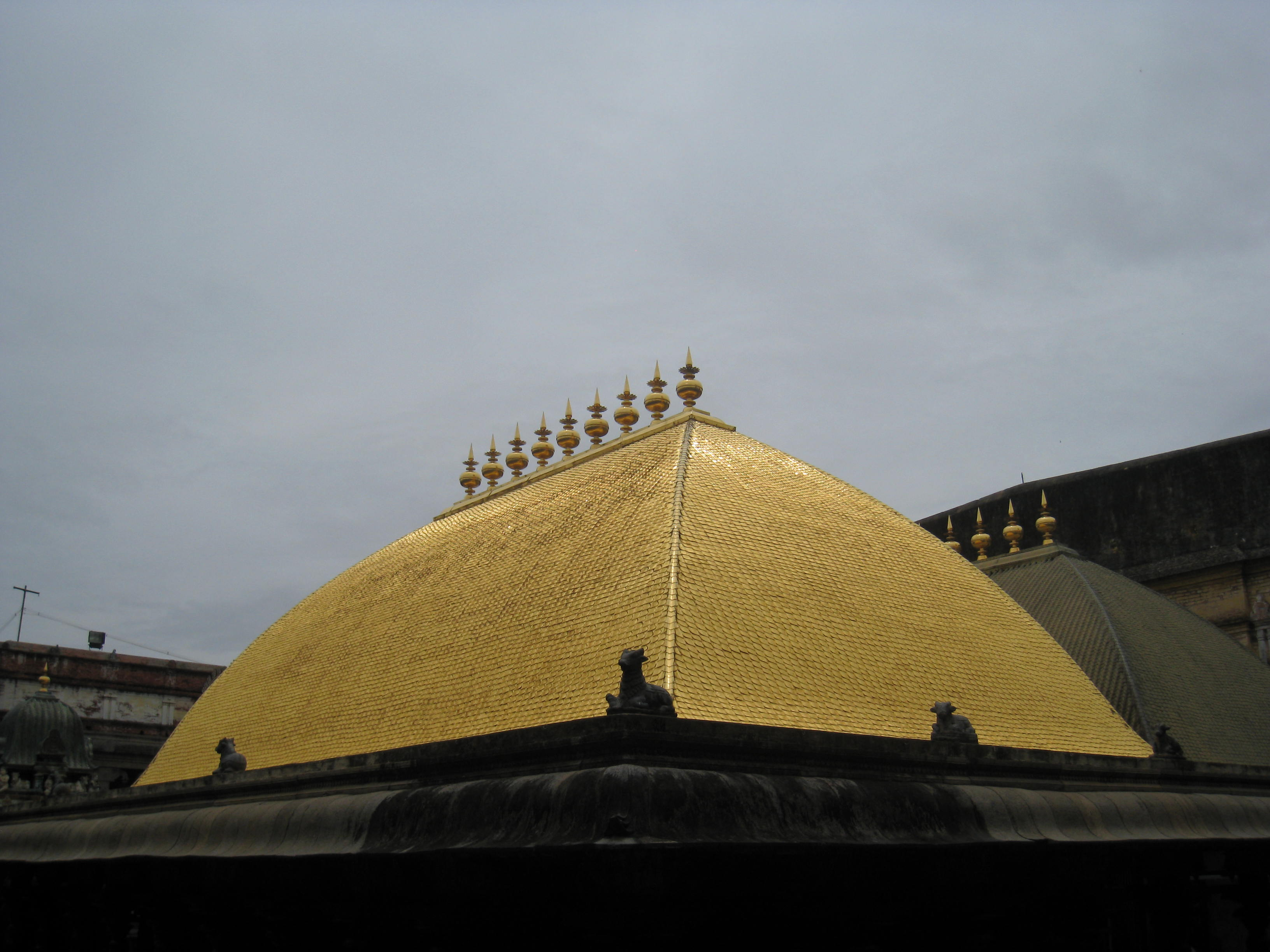
Golden Roof, Nataraja Temple in Chidambaram

The temple as it stands had a pre-Chola existence and the architecture is a combination of Chola and Pandyan architecture with the Sanctum Sanctorum closely resembling Kerala style structures. Indeed, the royal charters mention the rebuilding of the Sanctum using architects from Kerala. However, the golden roof is a striking example of Vesara architecture with its apsidal shape. Two small structures called the Chit Sabha and Kanak Sabha form the crux of the vast architectural complex. The temple is spread over a 40-acre (16 ha) area, within layers of concentric courtyards. The inner sanctum, its connecting mandapams and pillared halls near it are all either squares or stacked squares or both. The complex has nine gopurams, several water storage structures of which the Shivaganga sacred pool is the largest with a rectangular plan. The temple complex is dedicated to Nataraja Shiva and theological ideas associated with Shaivism concepts in Hinduism. However, the temple also includes shrines for Devi, Vishnu, Subrahmanyar, Ganesha, Nandi and others including an Amman shrine, a Surya shrine complete with Chariot wheels. The plan has numerous gathering halls called sabha, two major choultry called the 100 pillared and 1,000 pillared halls, inscriptions and frescoes narrating Hindu legends about gods, goddesses, saints and scholars.

=== Courtyards ===
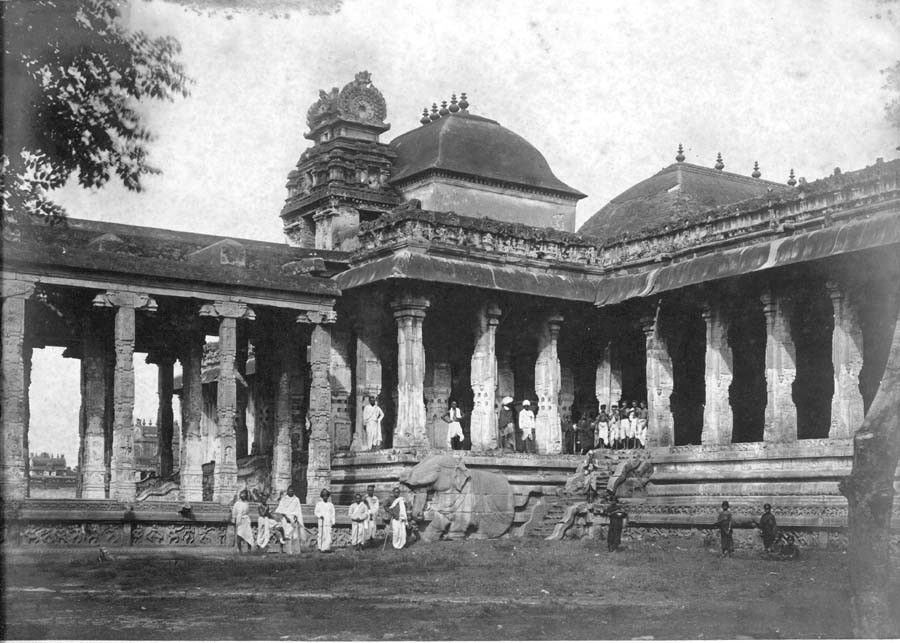
Mandapam of thousand pillars, ca. 1800–1850.

The Nataraja Temple complex is embedded inside four prakarams (courtyards). Each courtyard has walls that were defensively fortified after the 14th-century plunder and destruction.

The outermost wall around the fourth courtyard has four gateways. The walls and gateways of the fourth courtyard were added in the 16th century by Vijayanagara rulers after they had defeated the Madurai Sultanate, and this outermost layer was heavily fortified by the Nayakas in the 17th century. These face the four large gopurams that are gateways into the third courtyard. These gopurams are also landmarks from afar. Inside the third courtyard, near the northern gopuram, is the Shivaganga tank, the thousand pillar mandapam, the Subrahmanyar (Murugan, Kartikeya) shrine and the shrine for Parvati (as Shivakama Sundari). The other three gateways are closer to the sanctum. The four gopurams pilgrims and visitors to enter the temple from all four cardinal directions. The complex is interconnected through a maze of pathways.

The courtyard walls and gateways are made from cut stones with some brick structure added in. The gardens and palm groves are in the fourth courtyard, outside the walls of the third courtyard walls with the four large gopurams. These were restored or added in by the Vijayanagara rulers in the 16th century.

=== Towers: gopurams ===
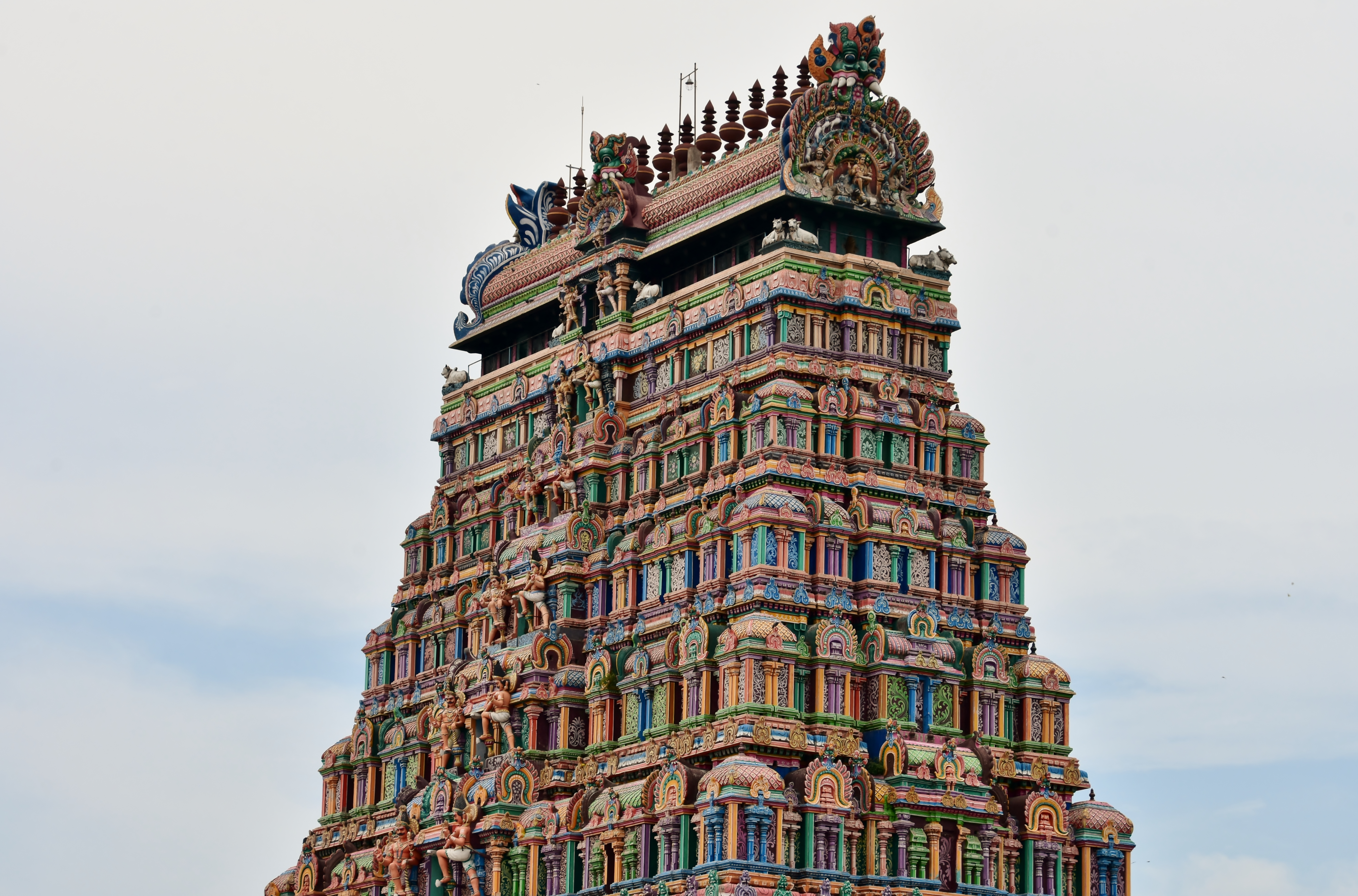
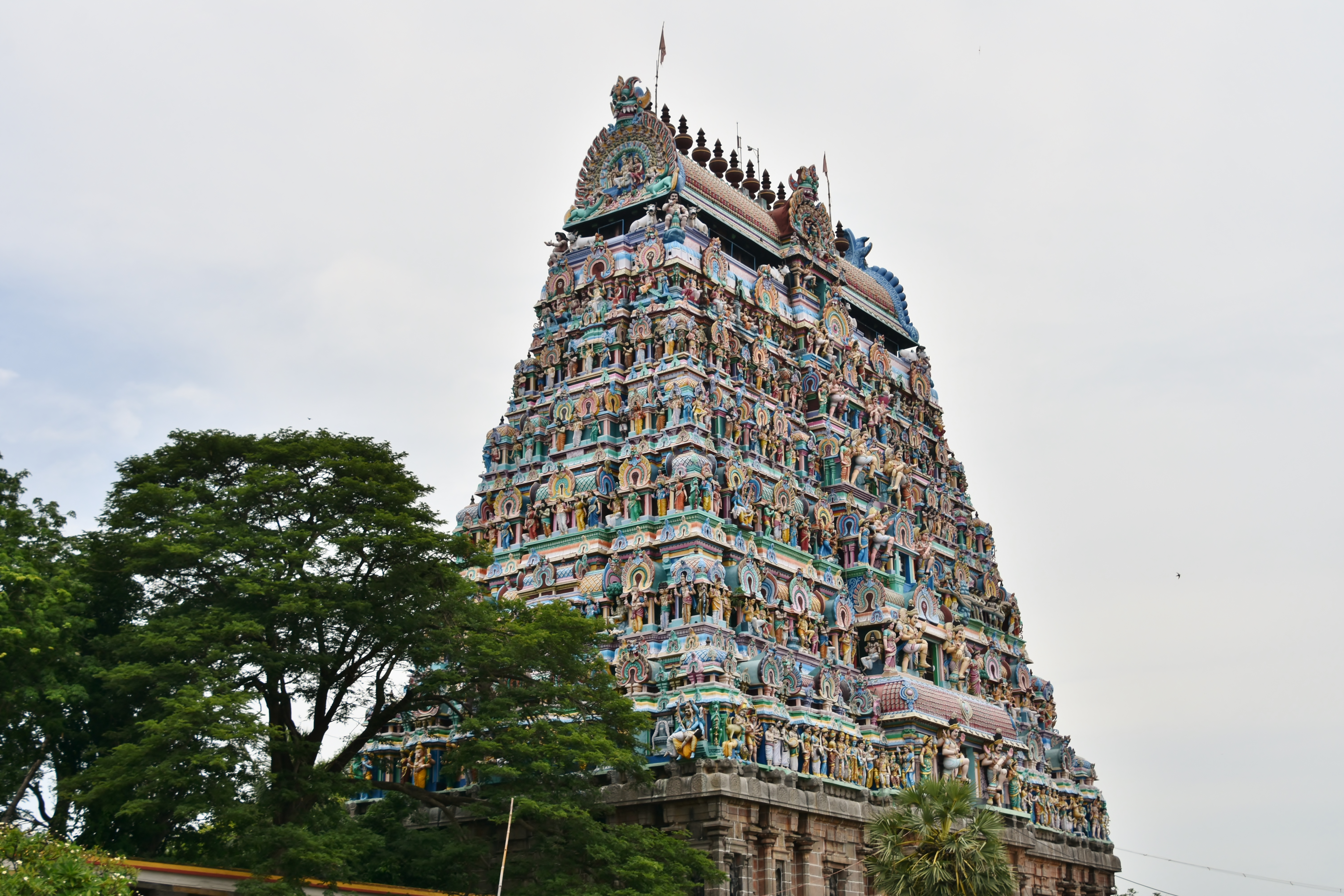
Two distinct styled gopurams of the Chidambaram temple. The artwork narrates religious and secular stories from Hindu texts.

The temple has nine major gopuram gateways connecting the various courtyards. Four of these are huge and colorful, visible from afar, a symbolic and convenient landmark for pilgrims. These gateway towers or gopurams each have 7 storeys facing the East, South, West and North. The first edition of the four gopuram superstructures were likely built between 1150 and 1300 CE. The earliest was likely the western gopuram, which is also the smaller of the four. This is generally dated to about 1150 CE. The eastern gopura was likely completed by about 1200 CE, southern gopura by the mid-13th century, while the northern was added in the late 13th century. The four high gopurams were destroyed, rebuilt, repaired, enlarged and redecorated several times after the 13th century. This has made the gopurams difficult to place chronologically, yet useful in scholarly studies of the history of the Nataraja temple.

All gopurams are built of precisely cut large stone blocks all the way to the main cornice. Upon this is a stone, brick and plaster structure with layers of pavilions. Above these talas (storeys) is a South Indian style barrel vaulted roof, crowned with thirteen kalasa finials. All of them are similar in size with a 14:10:3 ratio, about 42.7 metres (140 ft) high, 30.5 metres (100 ft) wide and 9.1 metres (30 ft) deep.

==== Artwork on the gopuram ====
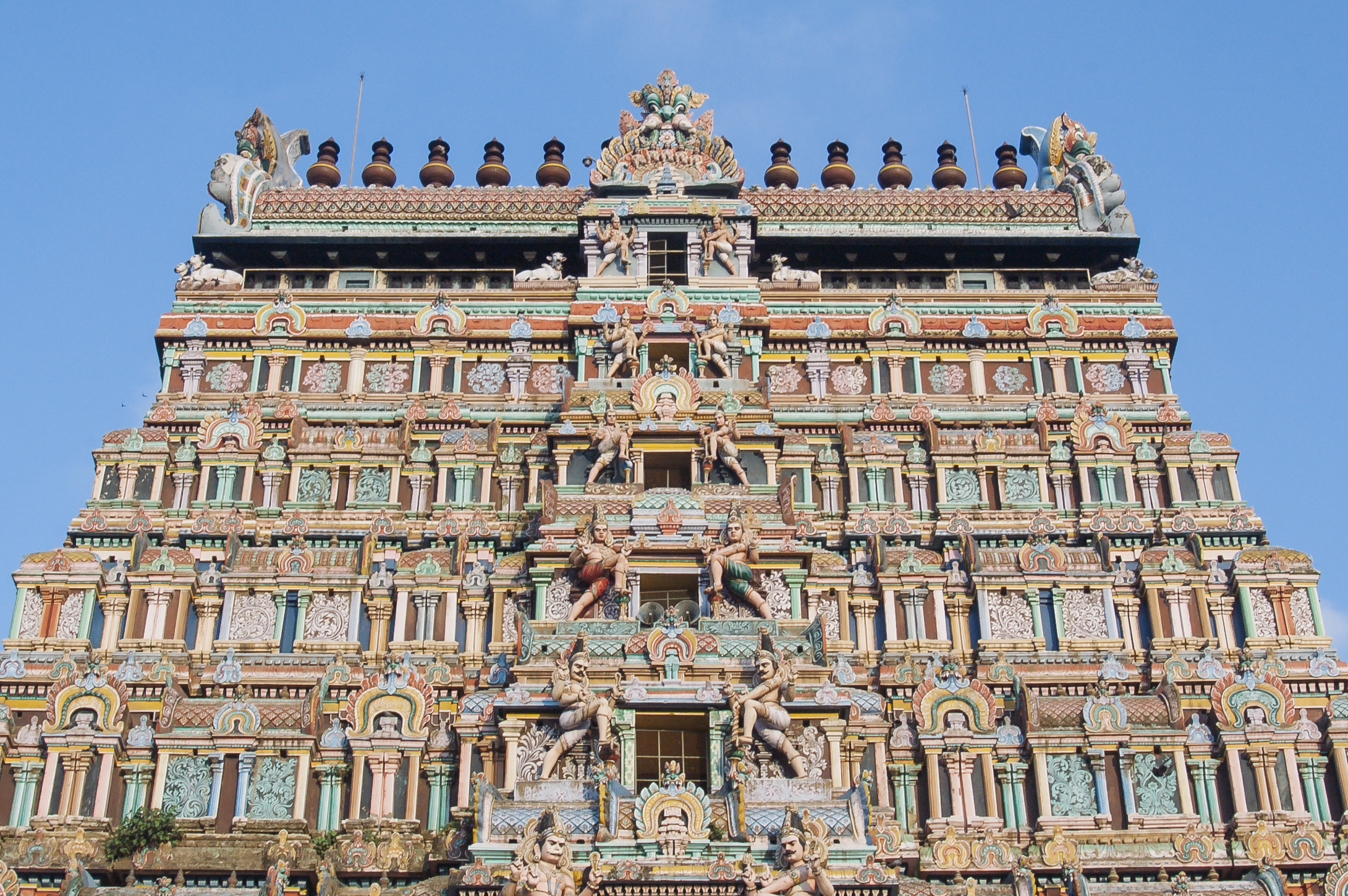
Nataraja Temple gopuram artwork in Chidambaram, Tamil Nadu

Each gopuram is colorful and unique in its own ways. They narrate stories from various Hindu texts, showing religious and secular scenes from the various Hindu traditions. This art is presented in each gopuram with anthropomorphic figure panels and about fifty niches with stone sculptures in every gopuram. The scenes include multiple panels about the legend of Shiva-Parvati wedding with Brahma, Vishnu, Saraswati and Lakshmi attending, dancing Ganesha, Shiva in his various aspects, Durga in the middle of her war with a demon, Skanda ready for war, seated Nandi, musicians, dancers, farmers, merchants, sadhu in namaste posture, dancing dvarapalas near the vertical center line and others. The artists and architects who built these gopura may have had a rationale in the relative sequence and position of the artwork with respect to each other and on various levels, but this is unclear and a subject of disagreement among scholars.

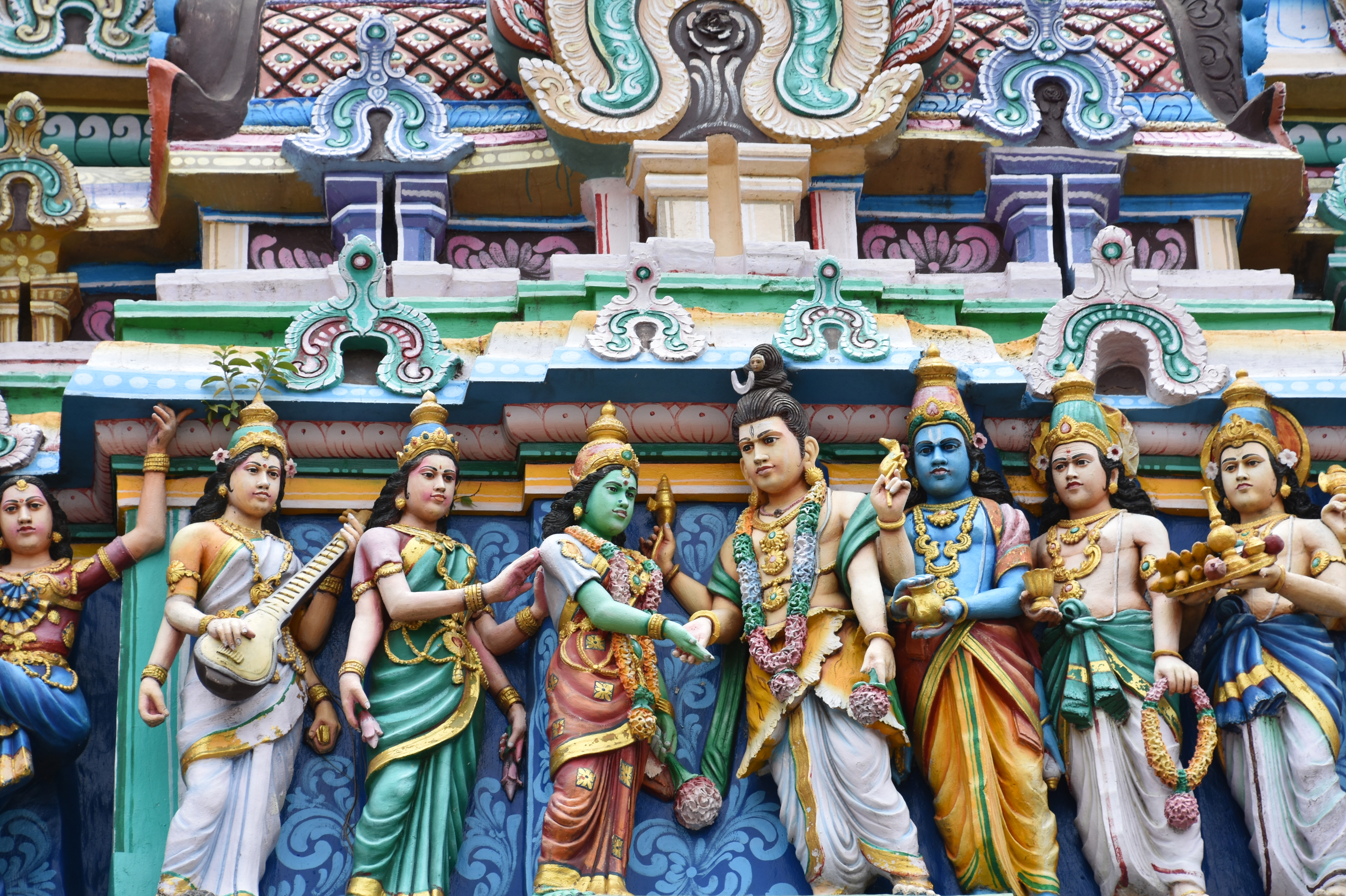
The artwork on gopuram showing Parvati-Shiva Kalyanasundara wedding legend. Near the newly weds are Saraswati, Lakshmi, Vishnu and others.

The earliest built western gopuram is the only one with inscriptions below each artwork that identifies what it is. The artwork on it includes Durga fighting the evil, shape shifting buffalo demon and Skanda sitting on peacock and dressed up for war. Other artwork found on the eastern gopuram include Surya, Ganapati, Vishnu, Sridevi (Lakshmi), Tripura Sundari, Brahma, Saraswati, Varuna, Durga, Agni, several rishis, Yamuna goddess, Kama and Rati, Budha, the Vedic sages such as Narada and Agastya, Pantanjali, Somaskanda legend, Ardhanarishvara (half Shiva, half Parvati), Harihara (half Vishnu, half Shiva), several forms of dancing Shiva and others.

The surviving south gopuram called the Sokkaseeyan Thirunilai Ezhugopuram was constructed by a Pandya king identified from the presence of the dynasty's fish emblem sculpted on the ceiling. The Pandyas sculpted two fishes facing each other when they completed gopurams (and left it with one fish, in case it was incomplete). Other artwork found on the southern gopuram include Chandesha, Ganapati, Vishnu, Sridevi (Lakshmi), several Devis, Brahma, Saraswati, Surya, Chandra, Durga, Indra, Agni, several rishis, Ganga and Yamuna goddesses, Kama and Rati, Budha, the Vedic sages such as Narada, Pantanjali, Somaskanda legend, Ardhanarishvara (half Shiva, half Parvati), Harihara (half Vishnu, half Shiva), several forms of dancing and standing Shiva such as Pashupata, Kiratarjuna and Lingobhava, as well as others.

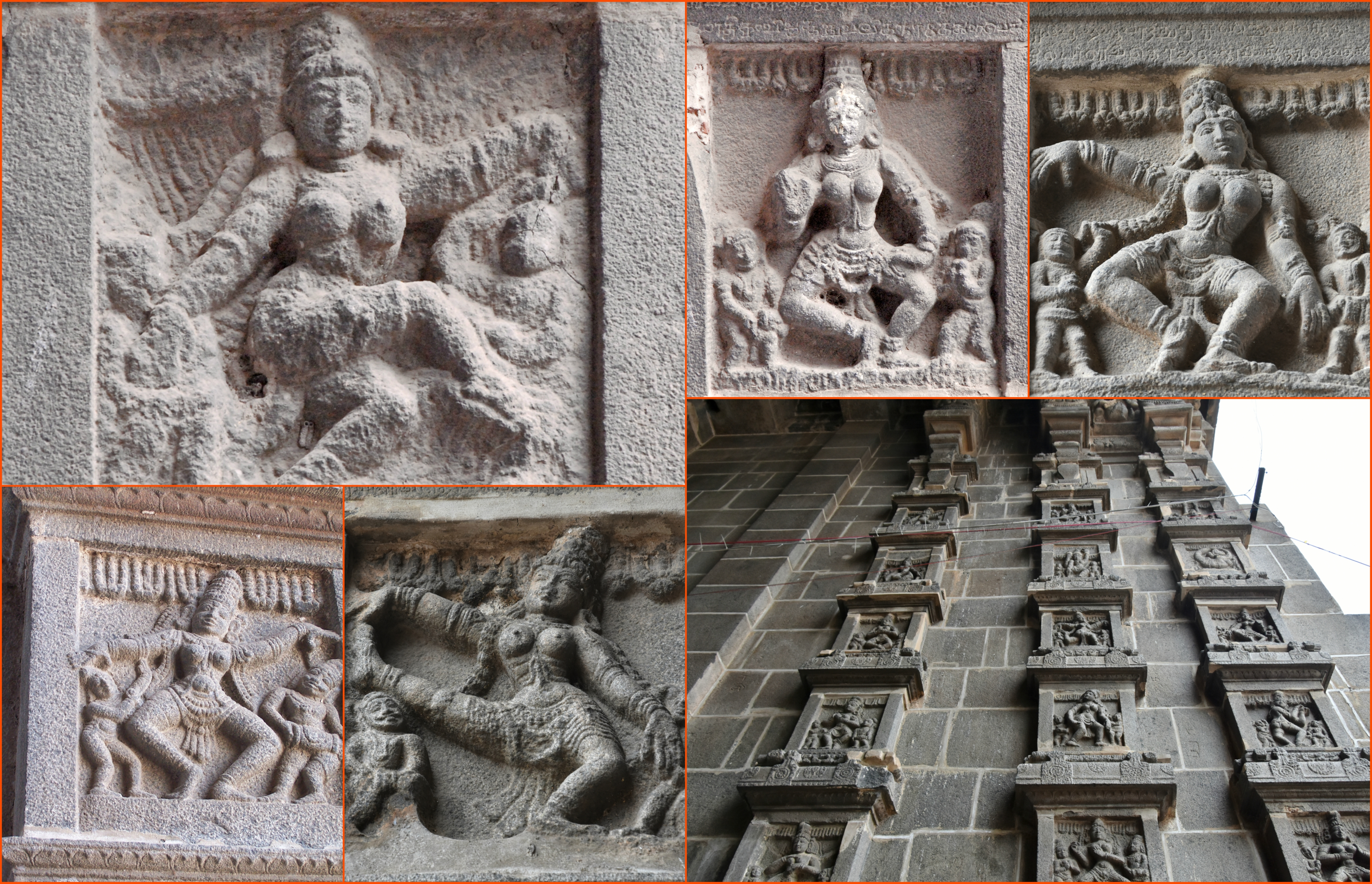
The eastern gopura wall shows all 108 dance postures from the Natya Shastra. The other gopuras also have dance images.

The eastern gopuram features the 108 reliefs of Natya Shastra dance postures (22 cm each in a separate niche) and faces the sanctum. The eastern gopuram is credited to king Koperunsingan II (1243–1279 CE) as per epigraphical records and was repaired with support from a woman named Subbammal in the late 18th century.

The northern gopuram was repaired and finished by the Vijayanagara king Krishnadevaraya (1509–1530 CE) in the 16th century. The eastern and northern gopura also depicts the wide range of narratives as the southern and western gopuram.

The idols of Pachaiappa Mudaliar and his wife Iyalammal have been sculpted on the eastern gopuram. The Pachaiappa Trust to date has been responsible for various functions in the temple and also maintain the temple car. The eastern gopuram is renowned for its complete enumeration of 108 poses of Indian classical dance – Bharathanatyam, detailed in small rectangular panels along the passage that leads to the gateway.

=== Shrines ===
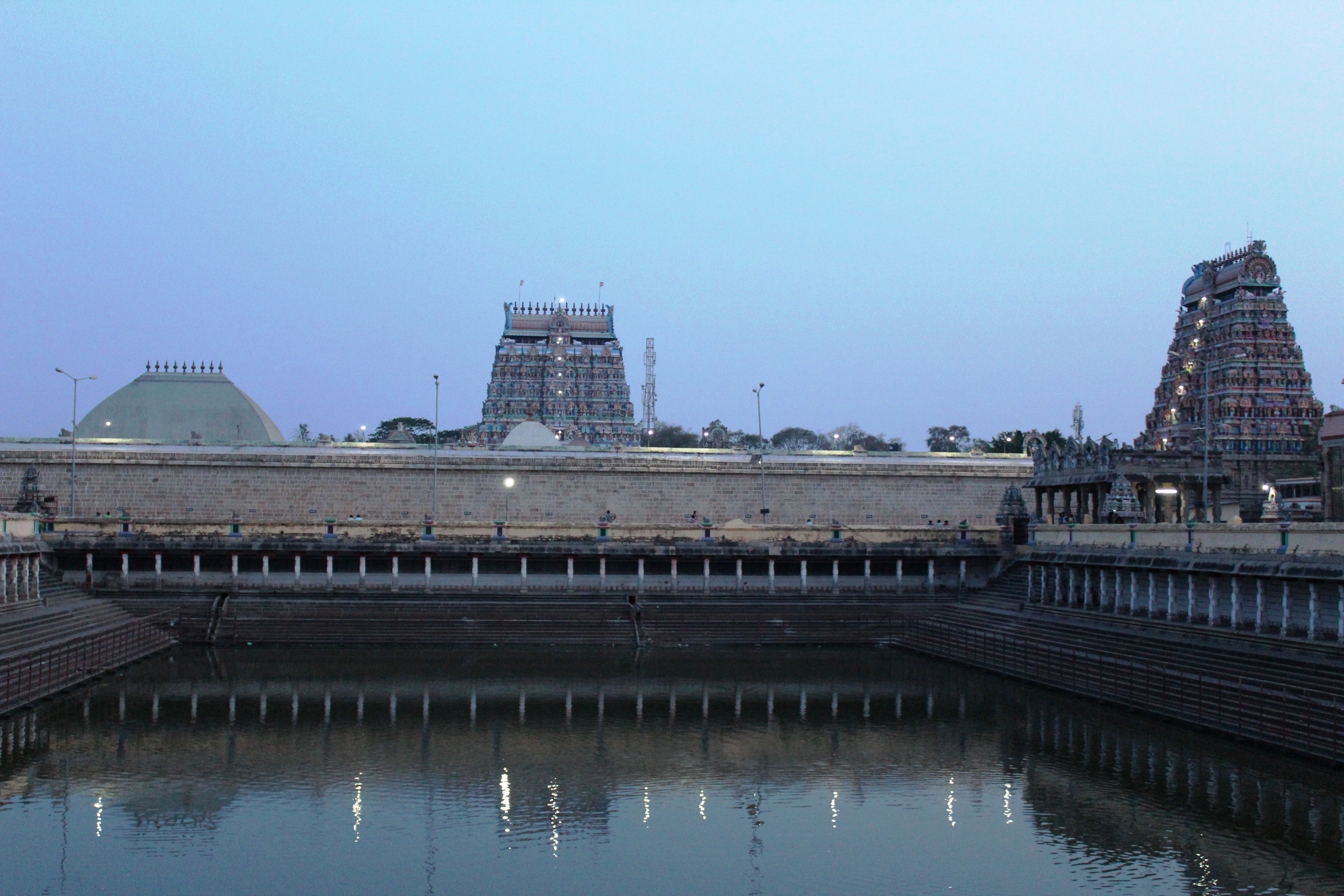
The Chidambaram temple complex includes gopura, vimana and the sacred pool

The temple complex has many shrines, most of which are related to Shaivism, Vaishnavism, and Shaktism. The innermost structures such as the sanctum and the shrines, all have square plans, but the gateways do not align except the innermost two courtyards.

==== Shaivism ====
The sanctum of the temple is set inside the innermost 1st prakara which is a square with about 44 metres (144 ft) side. This prakara is offset towards the west inside the 2nd prakara, which is also a square with about 105 metres (344 ft) side. The Shiva sanctum is unusual as it depicts Shiva in three forms. a crystal Shivalinga (crystal represents space), the Chit Sabha (consciousness gathering, also called chit ambalam) with an image of Shiva Nataraja. This introspective empty space has a curtained space that is 3.5 meter long and 1.5 meter wide. It is called the rahasya (secret) in Hindu texts. It consists of two curtains, one red, the other black. Behind the curtains are 52 gold bilva leaves (bilva is the favourite leaf of Shiva). Aarti is done first to the Nataraja idol and then to the leaves after moving the curtains. According to George Michell, this is a symbolism in Hinduism of "enlightenment inside, illusion outside". It is replaced on the tenth day of the main festivals. The Chidambaram Rahasya is the "formless" representation of Shiva as the metaphysical Brahman in Hinduism, sometimes explained as akasha linga and divine being same as Self (Atman) that is everywhere, in everything, eternally.

Facing the Chit Sabha is the Kanaka Sabha (also called pon ambalam), or the gathering of dancers. These two sanctum spaces are connected by five silver gilded steps called the panchakshara. The ceiling of the Chit Sabha is made of wooden pillars coated with gold, while copper coats the Kanaka Sabha is copper colored.

==== Vaishnavism ====
The Nataraja temple complex incorporates Vaishnava themes and images like many Hindu temples in South India. A Vishnu shrine is found inside the sanctum of the temple in its southwest corner. According to George Michell and others, Chola kings revered Shiva, with Tyagaraja and Nataraja as their family deity. Yet, their urban Shaiva centers "echo a very strong substratum of Vaishnava traditions". This historic inclusiveness is reflected in Chidambaram with Vishnu Govindaraja in the same sanctum home by the side of Nataraja. After the turmoil of the 14th century when the temple was attacked and looted, there was period when some priests sought to restore only Shaiva iconography according to extant Portuguese Jesuit records. However, the Vijayanagara rulers insisted on the re-consecration of all historic traditions. The temple inscriptions confirm that Vishnu was included along with Shiva in the temple's earliest version, and was reinstalled when the temple was reopened by the Vijayanagara kings.

Some texts from the time of king Kulottunga II give conflicting reports, wherein the Shaiva texts state that the king removed the Vishnu image while Vaishnava texts state that they took it away and installed it in Tirupati, sometime about 1135 CE. The scholar Vedanta Desika re-established the co-consecration in 1370 CE, about the time Vijayanagara Empire conquered Chidambaram and northern Tamil lands from the Madurai Sultanate. The current shrine, states Michell, is from 1539 financed by king Achyutaraya and it features a reclining figure of Vishnu.

The Govindaraja shrine is one of the 108 holy temples of Vishnu called divyadesam, revered by the 7th-to-9th-century saint poets of Vaishnava tradition, Alwars. Kulashekhara Alwar mentions this temple as Tillai Chitrakutam and equates Chitrakuta of Ramayana fame with this shrine. The shrine has close connections with the Govindaraja temple in Tirupati dating back to saint Ramanuja of the 11th and 12th centuries.

==== Shaktism ====
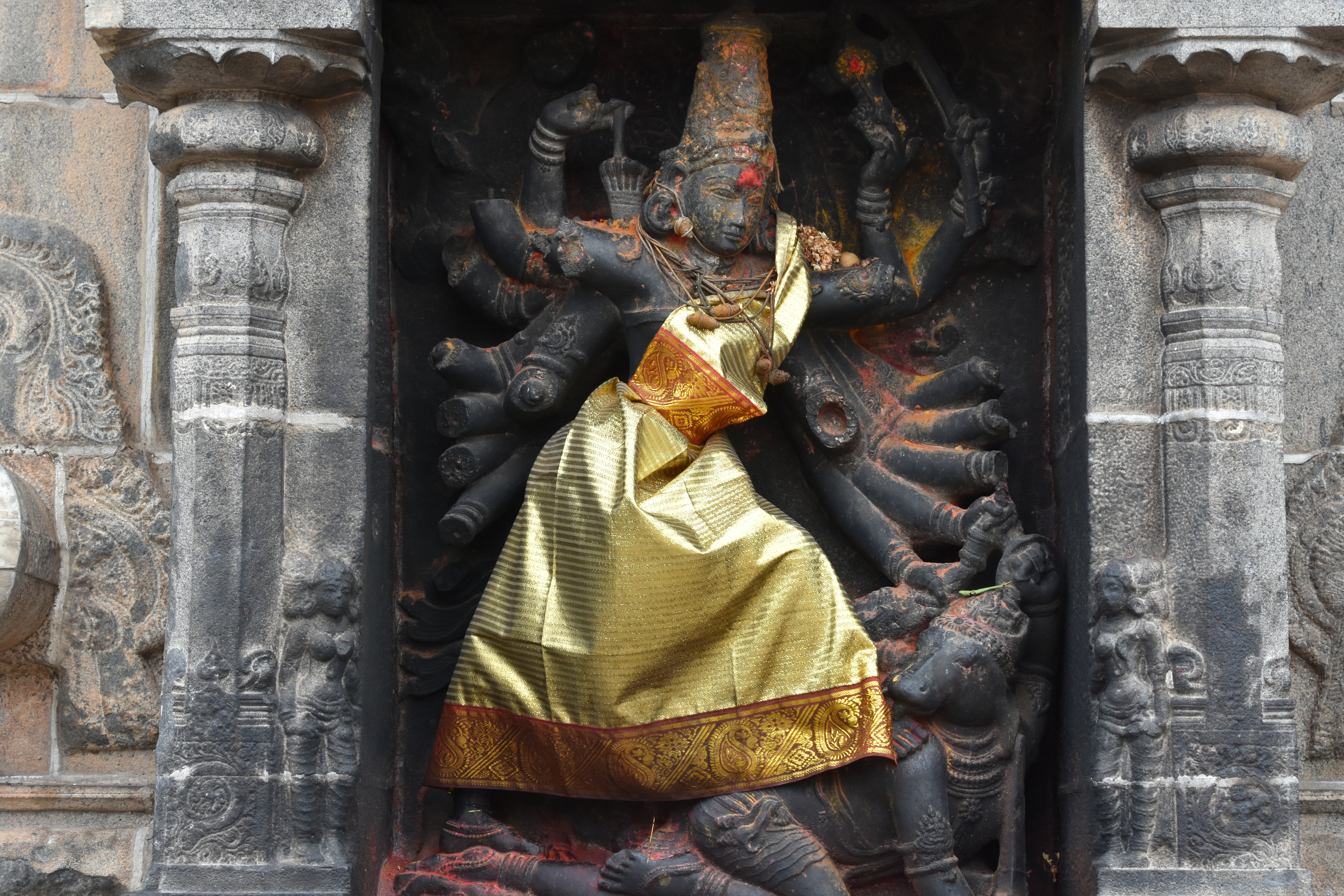
Durga in the Shivakama Sundari shrine, in her Mahishasuramardini form killing the buffalo demon below her foot.

The main Devi shrine in the Nataraja temple complex is offset towards the north of the sanctum inside the third prakara, and found to the west of the Shivaganga pool. It is called the Shivakama Sundari shrine, dedicated to Parvati. The temple faces east and has an embedded square plan, though the stacked squares created a long rectangular space. The shrine has its own walls and an entrance gateway (gopura). Inside is the dedicated mandapas and brightly colored frescoes likely from the 17th-century Vijayanagara period. These narrate the story of Shiva and Vishnu together challenging the "learned sages, ascetics and their wives" in the forest, by appearing in the form of a beautiful beggar that dances (bhikshatanamurti) and a beautiful girl that seduces (Mohini) respectively. Another set of frescoes are secular depicting temple festivities and daily life of people, while a stretch narrates the story of Hindu saints named Manikkavachakar and Mukunda.

The shrine had artwork narrating the Devi Mahatmya, a classic Sanskrit text of Shaktism tradition. However, in 1972, these were removed given their dilapidated state. These were replaced with a different story. Other parts of the paintings and shrine also show great damage.

The sanctum of the Shivakama Sundari shrine is dedicated to Devi, where she is Shiva's knowledge (jnana shakti), desire (iccha sakti), action (kriya sakti) and compassion (karuna sakti). The oldest Shivakama Sundari sculpture at the site representing these aspects of the goddess has been dated to the king Parantaka I period, about 950 CE.

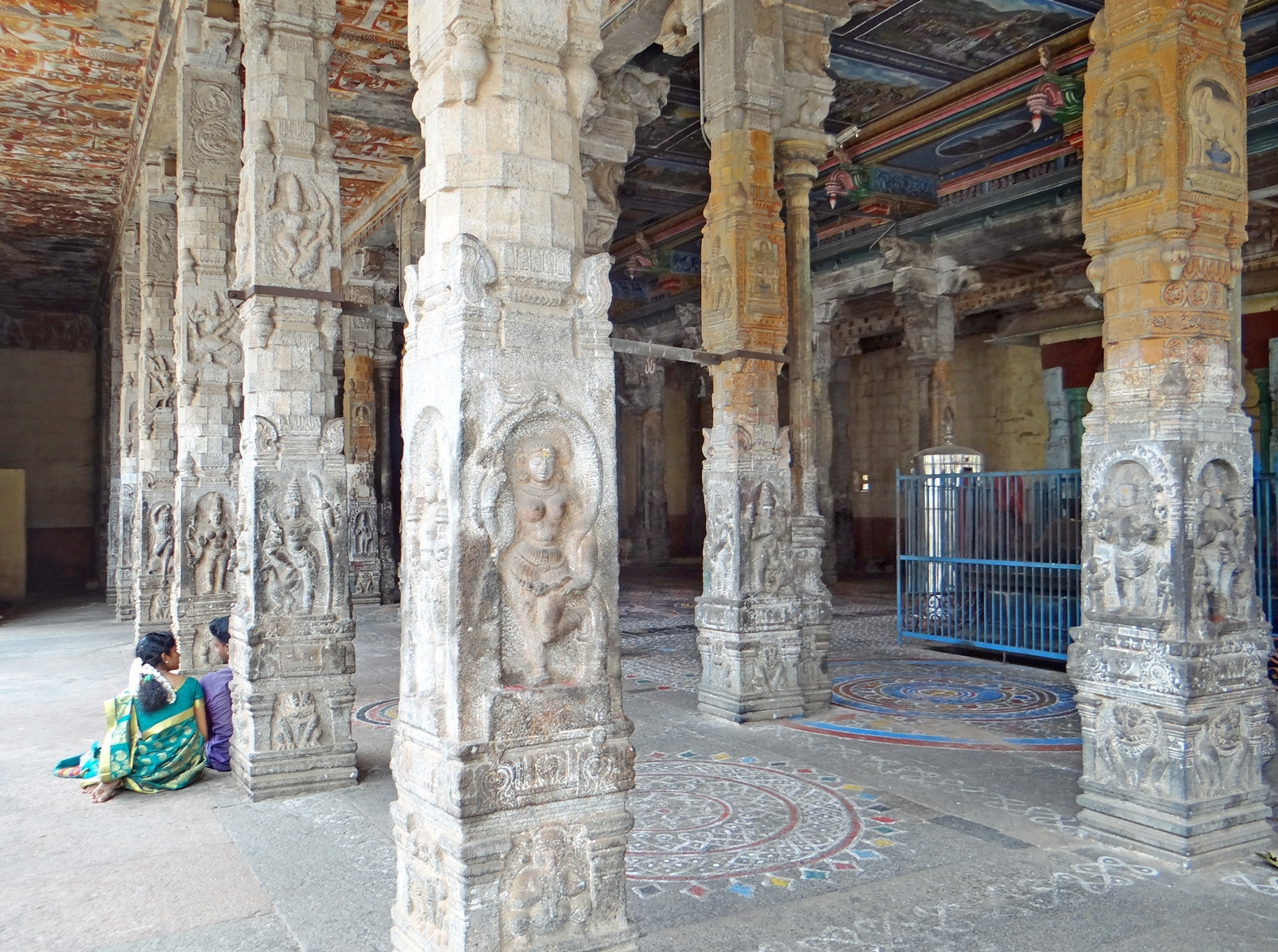
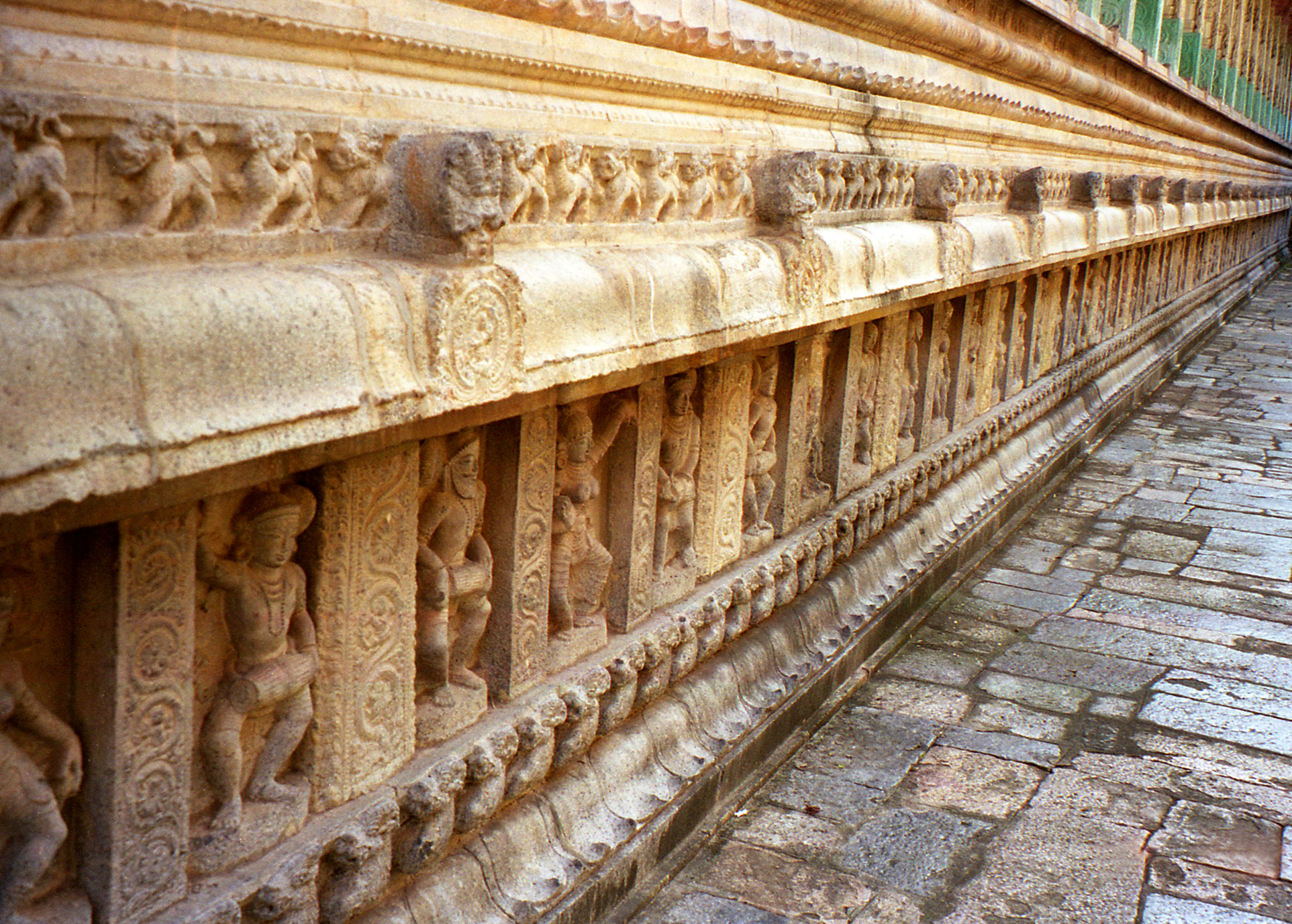
The circumambulation paths in shrines, the mandapa's moulded plinth and the pilgrim hall pillars of the Nataraja temple are carved with reliefs showing dancers and musicians.

==== Others ====
The Nataraja temple has a pre-13th-century Surya shrine. The image is unusual as it depicts a three headed Surya same as Brahma, Shiva and Vishnu, with eight hands holding iconographic items of these deities, along with two lotuses in a pair of hands in front, accompanied by two small female figures possibly Usha and Pratyusha, standing on a chariot drawn by seven horses and Aruna as charioteer. The temple also has a significant shrine for Ganesha in the southwest corner and a Subrahmanyar shrine in the northwest corner of the third courtyard.

=== Halls: sabha ===
The temple has many halls called sabha (lit. "community gathering", also called ambalams or sabhai) inside the complex. Two of these are the Chit Sabha and the Kanaka Sabha inside the sanctum area of the Nataraja shrine, described earlier. The other halls are:

==== Nrithya sabha ====
Nrithya sabha (also called Nritta Sabha, Natya sabha, or "Hall of Dance") is a "so-called 56-pillared" hall. It is in the south section of the second courtyard that circumambulates the Nataraja sanctum of the complex. This second courtyard is near the temple's flag mast (kodi maram or dwaja sthambam). The 13th-century Nritta Sabha is traditionally considered as the place where Shiva and Kali originally entered into a dance competition. Shiva won with the urdhva-tandava pose that raised his right leg straight up, a posture that Kali refused because she was a woman. The hall is rectangular consisting of three stacked squares, a 15-meter-sided square that is the main hall, which is connected to 4 meters by 8 meters rectangular mukha-mandapa to its north. The hall now has 50 pillars, but evidence suggests that it may have had 56 or more pillars earlier. These pillars are intricately carved from top to bottom. The lower levels have dancers in Natya Shastra mudras accompanied with expressive musicians as if both are enjoying creating the music and the dance. The pillars also have embedded narratives of legends from Hindu texts, such as of Durga fighting the buffalo demon, as well as humorous dwarfs frolicking. Below the kapota, the structures show reliefs of seated people, many in namaste posture, some with a beard and yogi like appearance representing saints and rishis. Nearly 200 of these are still visible, rest appear to have been damaged or eroded over time.

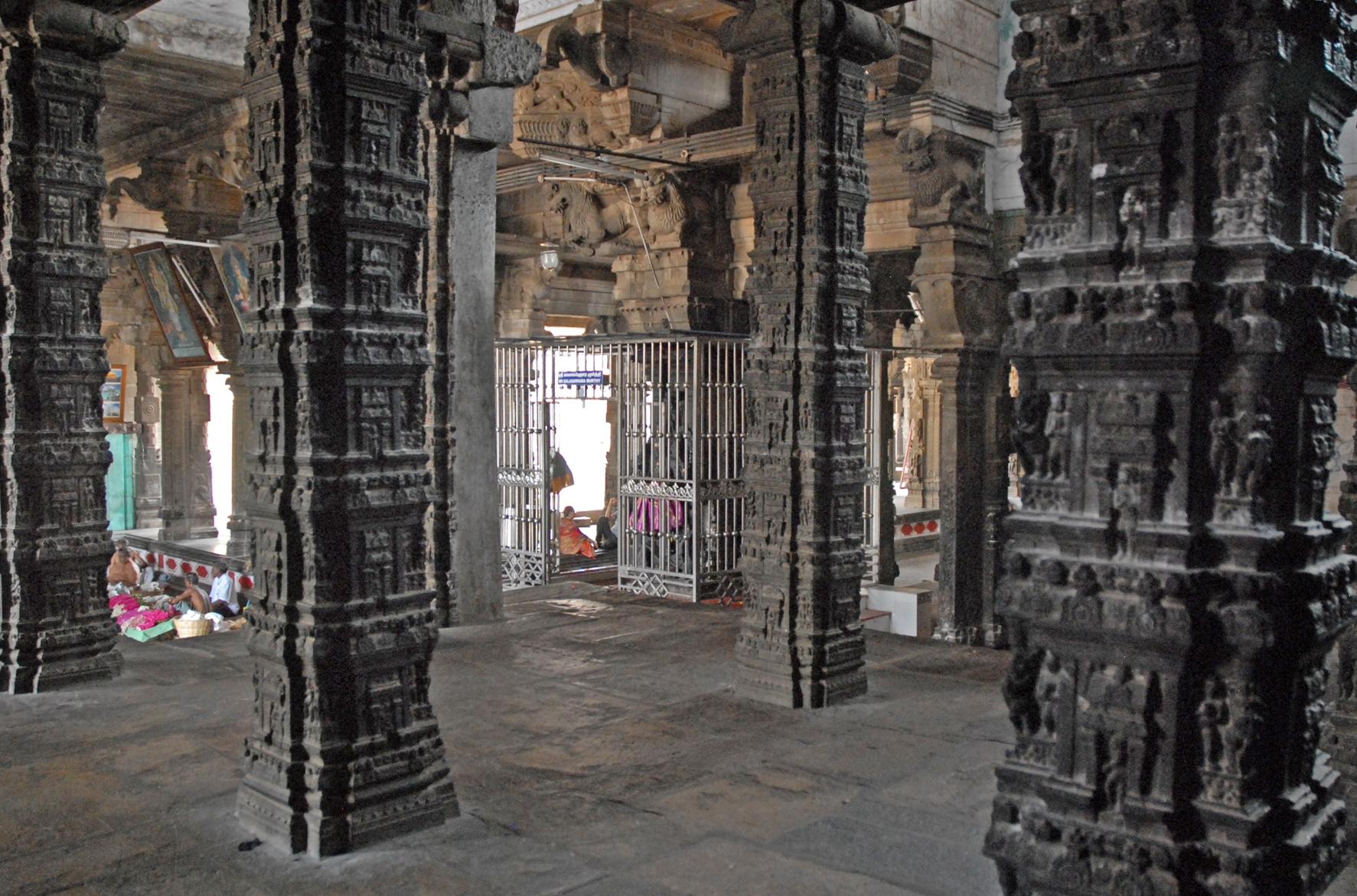
Carved pillars in a temple hall.

The Nrithya Sabha platform's base is carved as a chariot, with horses and wheels, as if it is rising out the ground. Historic texts state that the wheels were exquisitely carved and visible in the past, each about 1.25 meters (4.1 ft) in diameter with 28 spokes and 33 medallions, the chariot has ornamented horses 1.55 meters (5.1 ft) in height, on the wheel is a seated rishi as if he was guiding the movement. Only remnants of this structure remains now. The northern niche of the hall is carved with 14 figures in addition to Shiva as Kanakamurti. The Shiva image had been damaged and is now restored. The 14 figures include Surya (sun god), Chandra (moon god) and 12 rishis of which Narada and Tumburu with Vina can be identified, the others have been too damaged to identify but are likely Vedic rishis. Near them are women in seductive postures, some nudes, likely the wives of the rishis. Next to the northern niche with Shiva are two smaller niches, one for Patanjali seated on coiled serpent and another for Vyaghrapada, two mythical Chidambaram saints. The western wall also has a niche with a large Shiva image in his Vrisabhantika form. Once again rishis are with him, this time in namaste posture. A few figures are dressed royally like warriors and these may be representation of the Chola kings.

The hall's center is an open square, with an ornate inverted lotus ceiling decoration. Around this lotus are 108 coffers, each with two human figures in namaste posture, all oriented to be along the north–south axis likely to suggest the direction to performance artists who would perform live and aligning themselves to the chit sabha in the sanctum.

==== Raja sabha: 1,000 pillar hall ====
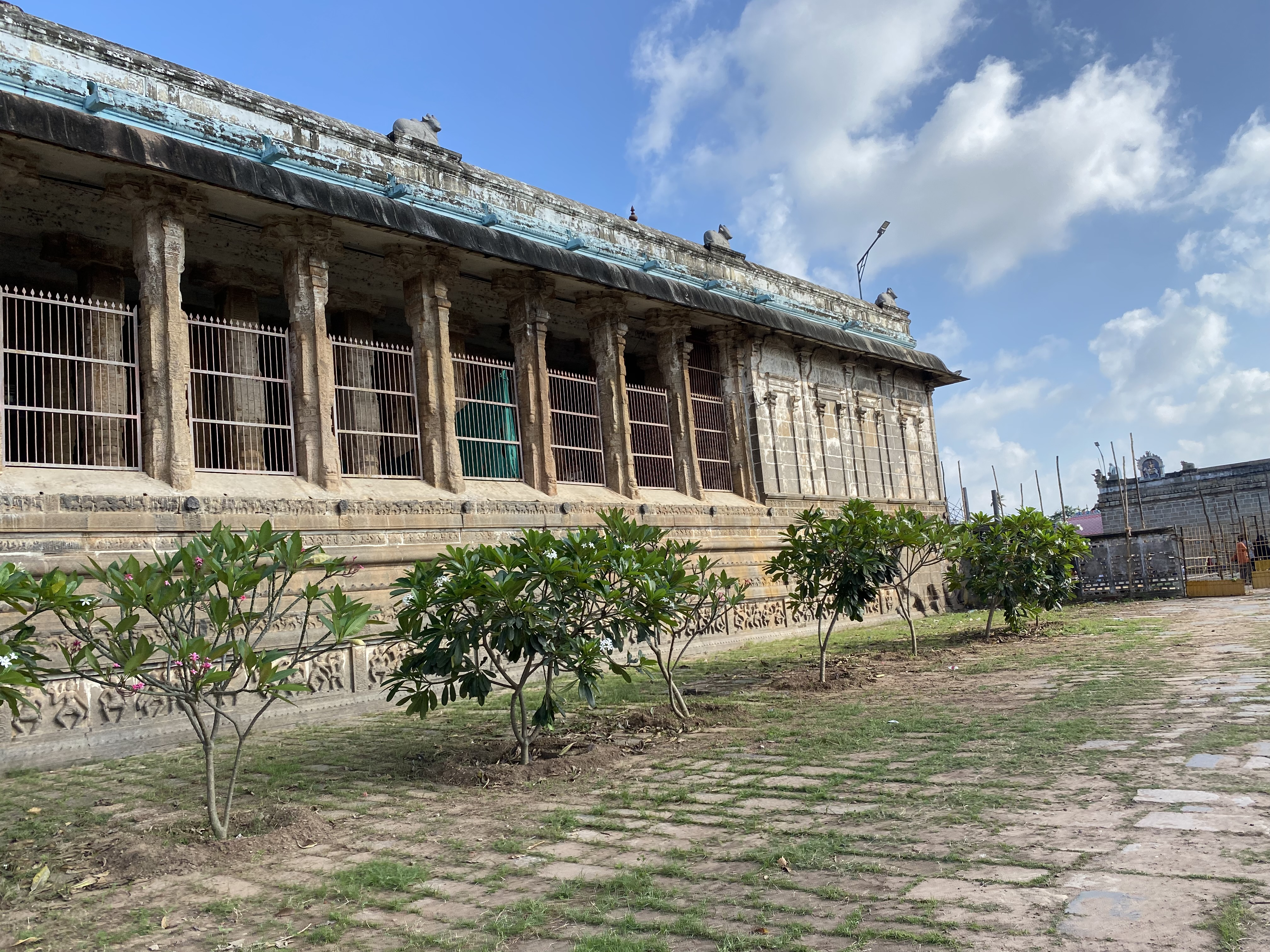

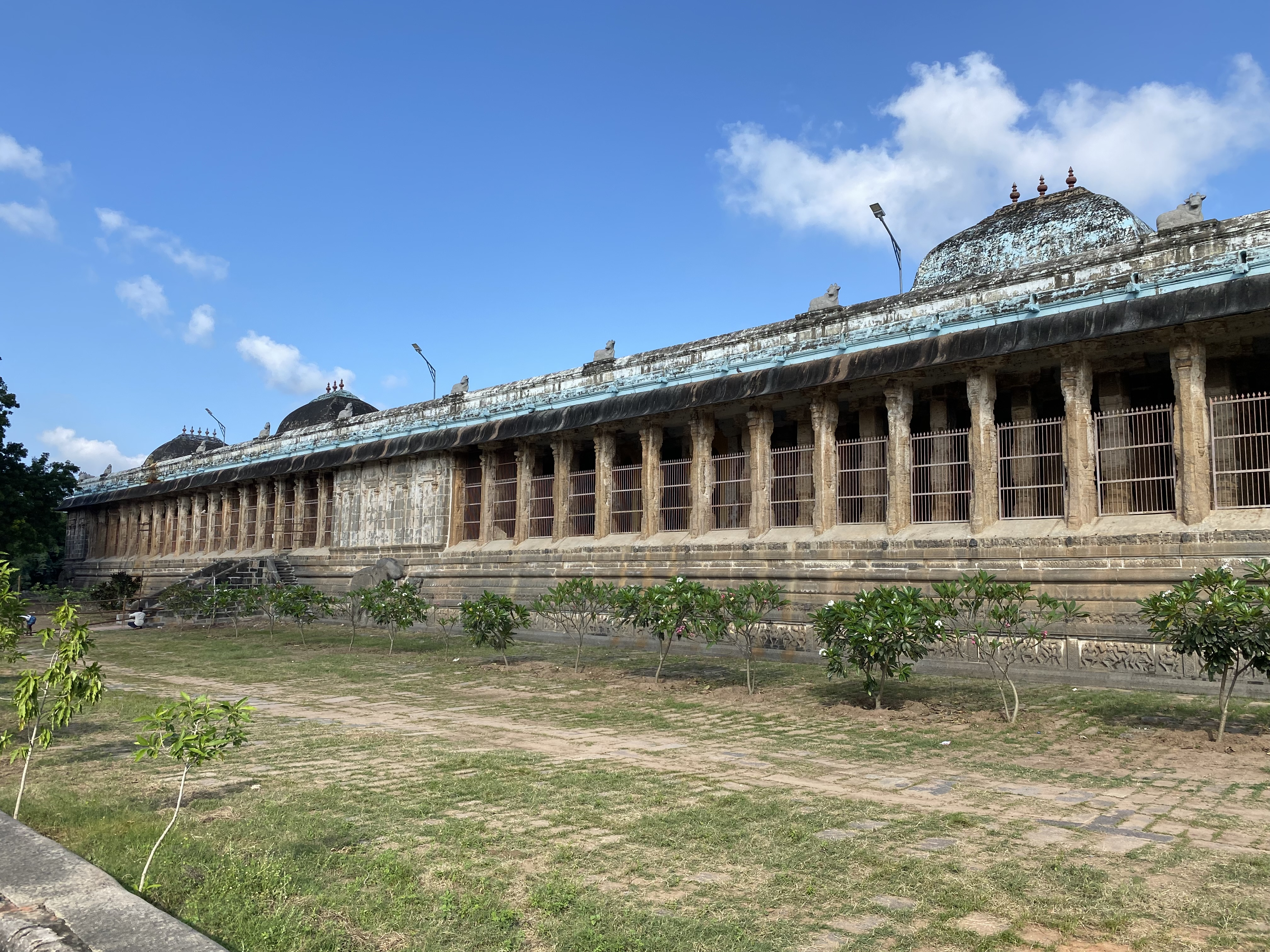

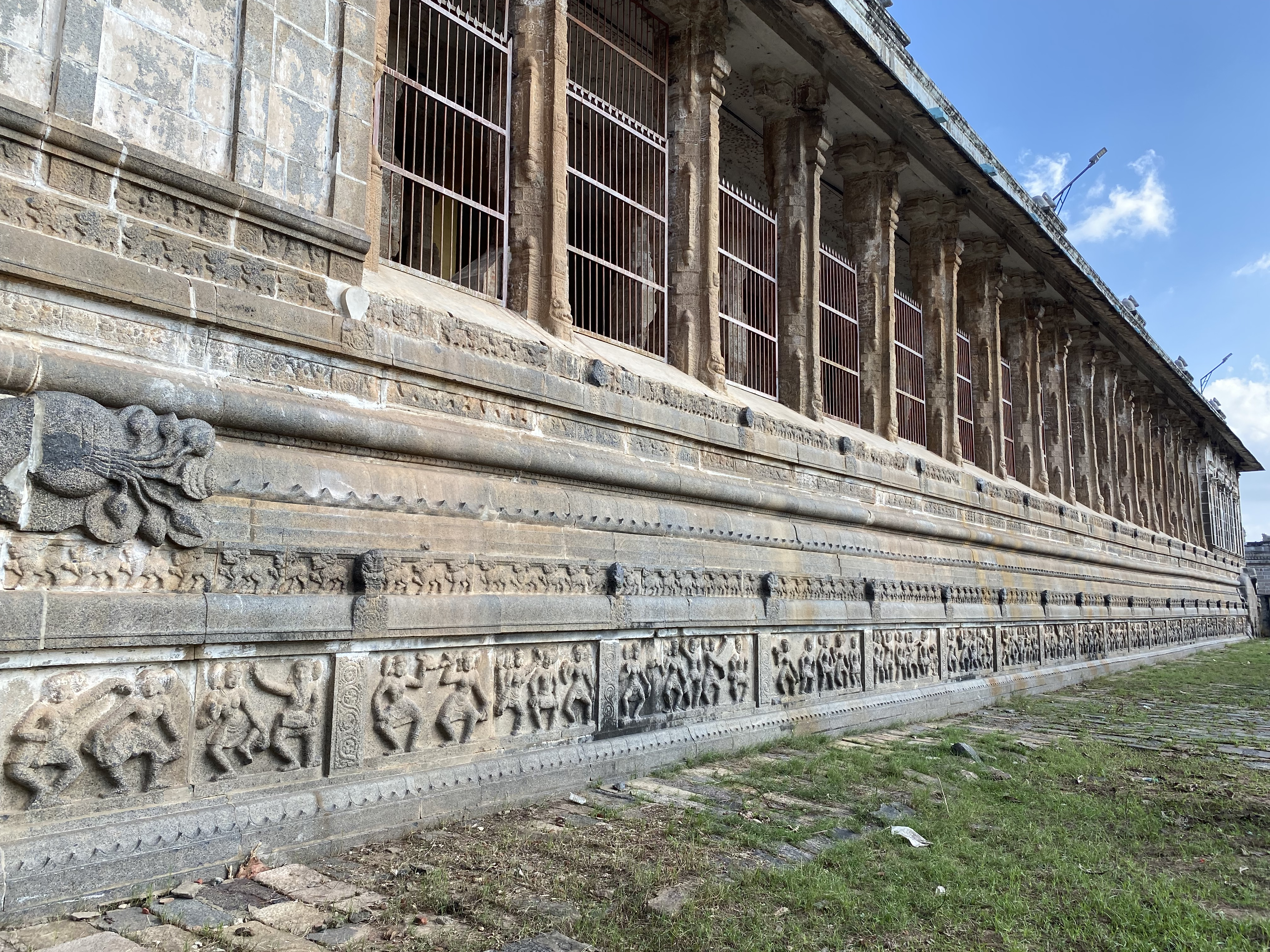

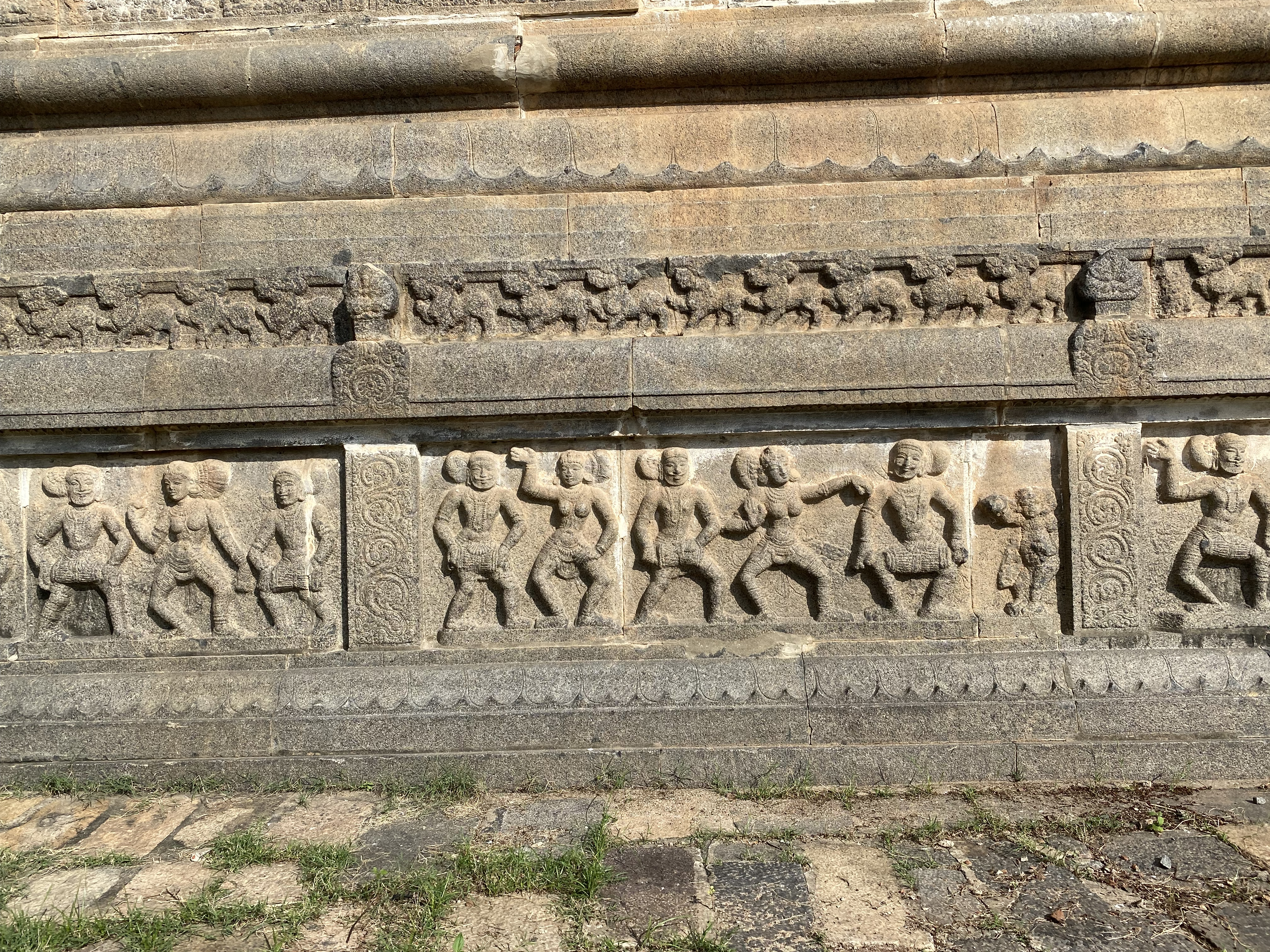

Raja sabha or the 1000-pillared hall is to the east of the Shivaganga pool, in the northeast part of the third courtyard. A pillared pathway from the eastern gopuram leads to it. It was a choultry for pilgrims with a convenient access to the pool. The hall's lower mouldings have dance mudras and medieval era musical instruments being played by musicians. The pillars have reliefs. It is now kept closed, except for festivals.

==== Shatasila sabha: 100 pillar hall ====
This is northwest of the sanctum, south of the Devi shrine. It is badly damaged and closed to public.

==== Deva sabha ====
Deva Sabhai is on the eastern side of the second courtyard. It is called Perampalam, literally "Great Hall" in the inscriptions, which suggests that it is an early structure and was historically important. According to Nanda and Michell, this may be the hall where Shaiva bhakti saints Nayanars came and sang hymns. It may also have hosted royal visits during the Chola era times.

The Deva sabha (divine gathering hall) houses the temple's revered collection of historic bronze sculptures and modern era frescoes. One of the paintings show Parvati seated in a chair, watching the Nrithya sabha hall.

=== Temple tanks ===
Temple Tank in Nataraja Temple, Chidambaram

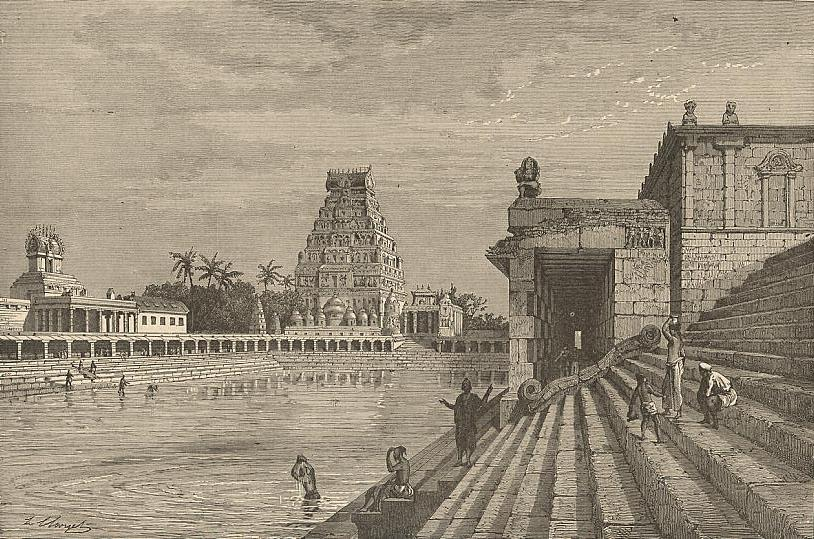
Sacred pool sketched in the 1870s.

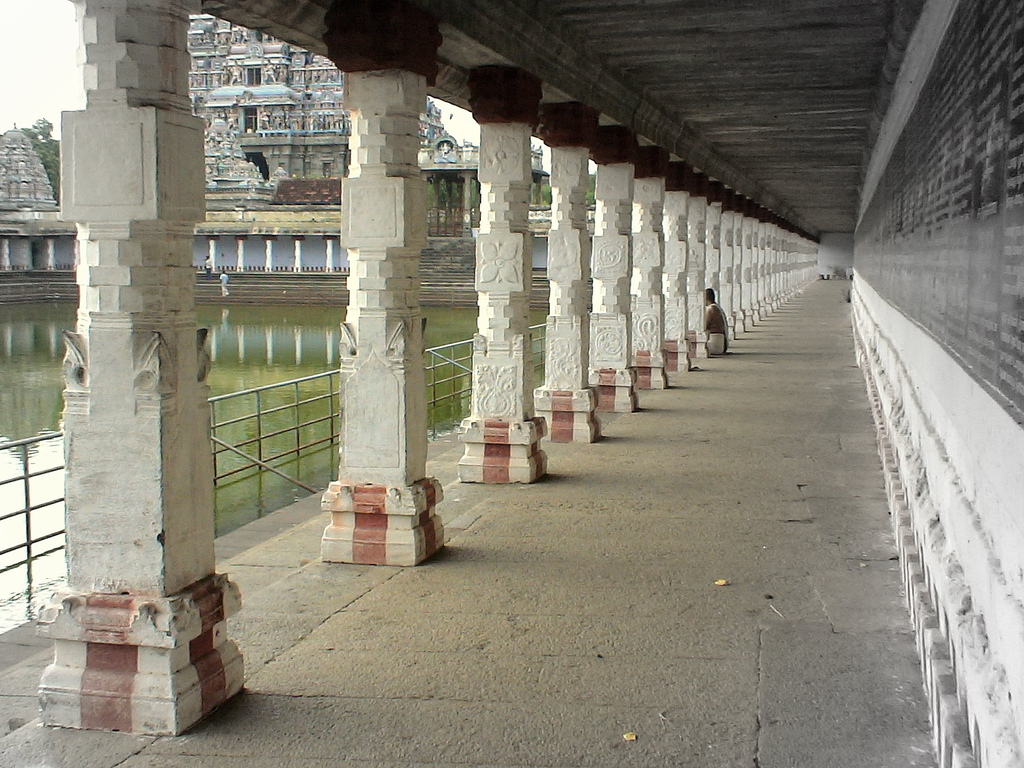
It is locally called the Sivaganga (சிவகங்கை).

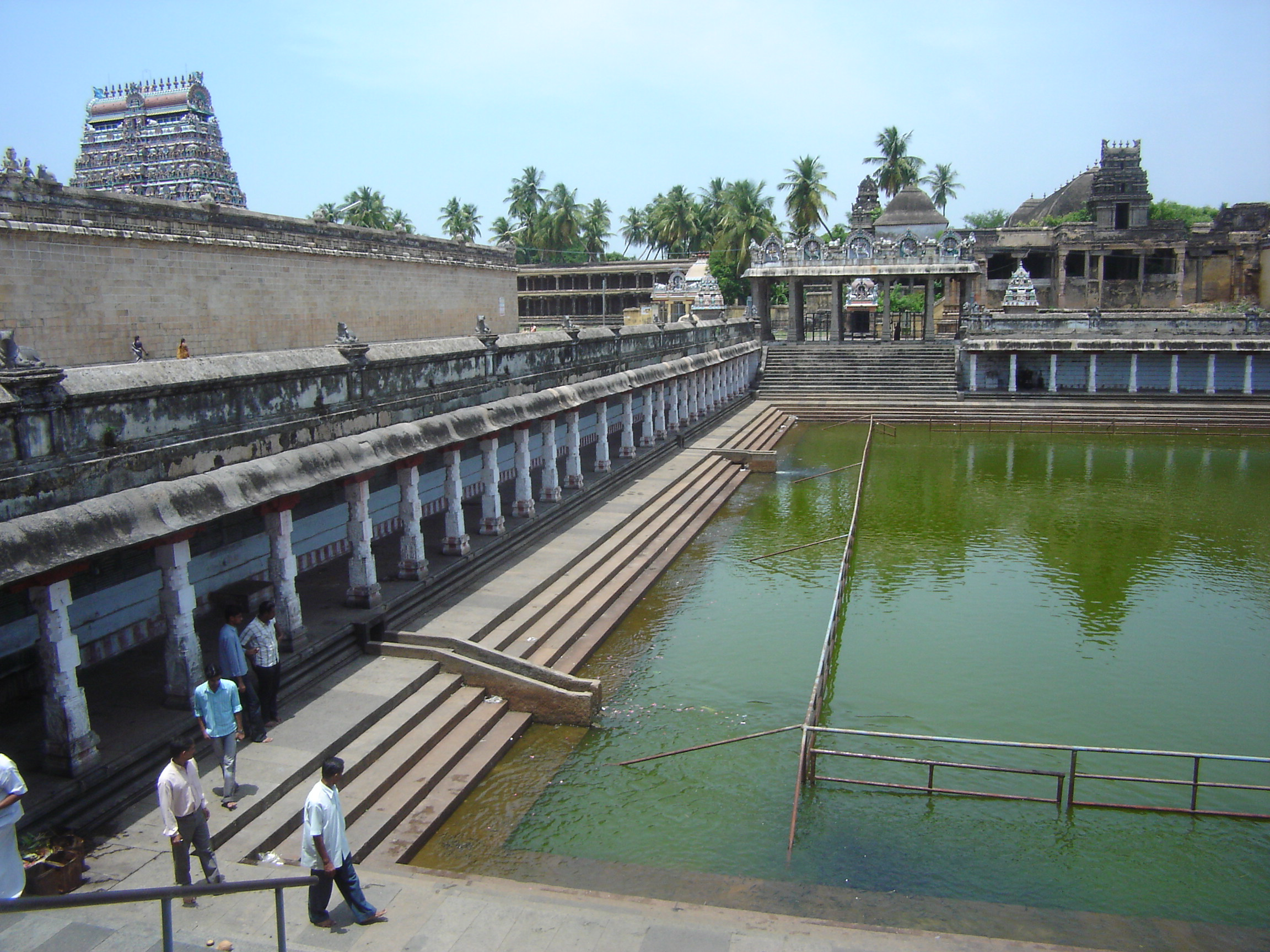
Steps (ghats) leading to the temple tank

The Chidambaram temple is well endowed with several water bodies within and around the temple complex.

- Sivaganga tank is in the third corridor of the temple opposite to the shrine of Shivagami. It is accessed by flights of stone steps leading from the shrine.
- Paramanandha koobham is the well on the eastern side of the Chitsabha hall from which water is drawn for sacred purposes.
- Kuyya theertham is situated to the north-east of Chidambaram in Killai near the Bay of Bengal and has the shore called Pasamaruthanthurai.
- Pulimedu is situated around a kilometer and a half to the south of Chidambaram.
- Vyagrapatha Theertham is situated on to the west of the temple opposite to the temple of Ilamai Akkinaar.
- Anantha Theertham is situated to the west of the temple in front of the Anantheswarar temple.
- Nagaseri tank is situated to the west of the Anantha thirtham.
- Brahma Theertham is situated to the north-west of the temple at Thirukalaanjeri.
- Underground channels at the shrine drain excess water in a northeasterly direction to the Shivapriyai temple tank of the Thillai Kali Temple, Chidambaram. Due to poor maintenance, it has not been in use.
- Thiruparkadal is the tank to the south-east of the Shivapriyai tank.

=== Inscriptions ===
Even though the history of the temple goes back to the Prabhandas and Tevaram, that is the Pallava period, the earliest known inscriptions are only that of Rajendra Chola and Kulothunga I followed by Vikrama Chola and other later rulers. The Nataraja temple inscriptions are notable for mentioning a library of manuscripts in temple premises. Two inscriptions dated to the early 13th century mention re-organization of old temple library. According to Hartmut Scharfe, the older library mentioned may date to the early 12th century. The inscriptions, states Scharfe, recite that the temple employed twenty librarians, of which eight copied old manuscripts to create new editions, two verified the copy matched the original and four managed the proper storage of the manuscripts.

There are many Chola inscriptions in the temple, both in Tamil and Sanskrit. These are attributed to Rajendra Chola I (1012-1044 CE), Kulothunga Chola I (1070-1120 CE), Vikrama Chola (1118-1135 CE), Rajadhiraja Chola II (1163 -1178 CE), Kulothunga Chola III (1178-1218 CE) and Rajaraja Chola III (1216-1256 CE). Pandya inscriptions date from Thribhuvana Chakravarthi Veerapandiyan, Jataavarman Thribhuvana Chakravarthi Sundarapaandiyan (1251-1268 CE) and Maaravarman Thribhuvana Chakravarthi Veerakeralanaagiya Kulashekara Pandiyan (1268-1308 CE). Pallava inscriptions are available for king Avani Aala Pirandhaan Ko-pperum-Singha (1216-1242 CE). Vijayanagara Kings mentioned in inscriptions are Veeraprathaapa Kiruttina Theva Mahaaraayar (1509-1529 CE), Veeraprathaapa Venkata Deva Mahaaraayar, Sri Ranga Theva Mahaaraayar, Atchyutha Deva Mahaaraayar (1529-1542 CE) and Veera Bhooopathiraayar. One of the inscriptions from the descendant of Cheramaan Perumal nayanar, Ramavarma Maharaja has been found.

=== Ratha/Chariot ===
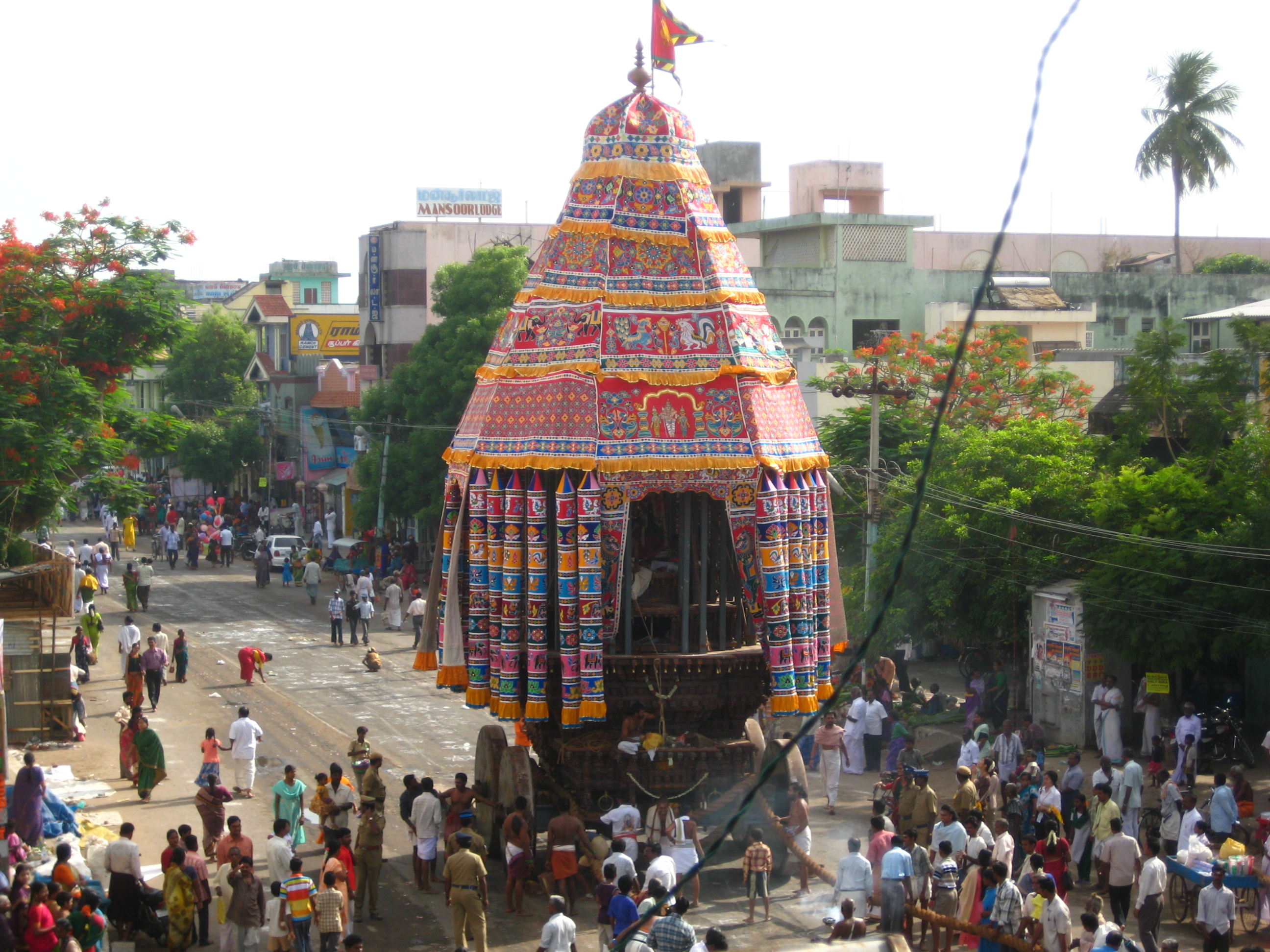
The Ratha of Natraja used during festival processions.

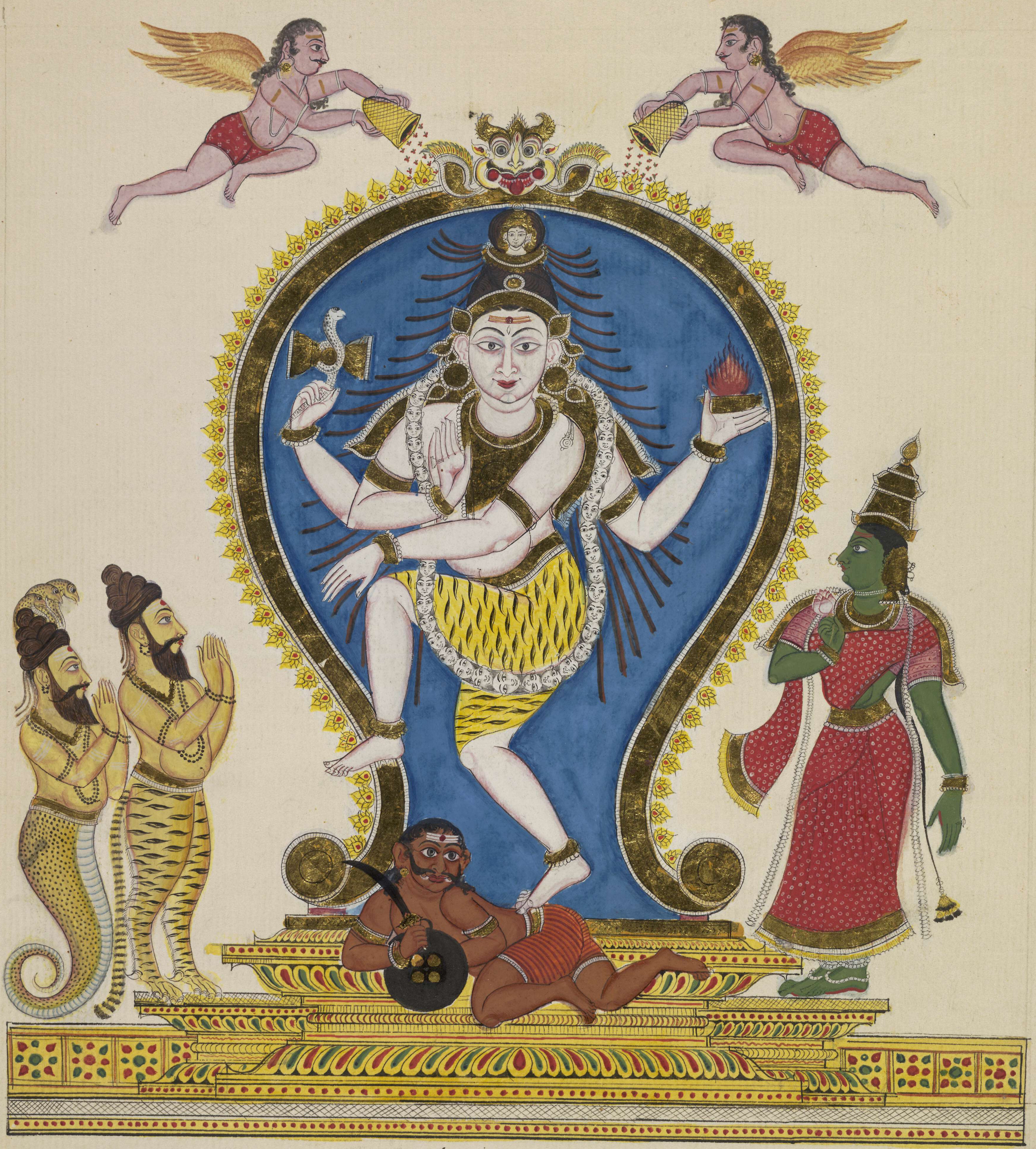
An 1820 painting of Nataraja in a temple chariot.

The Chidambaram Ratha is used for processions twice a year, where it is drawn by several thousand devotees during the festivals.

=== Significance of the architecture ===
The temple sanctum contains a silver sculpture of Shiva in his Ānanda-tāṇḍava Nataraja aspect. It signifies:

- The demon under Lord Nataraja's feet signifies that ignorance is under His feet.
- The fire in His hand means He is the destroyer of evil.
- The raised hand (Abhaya or Pataka mudra) signifies that He is the savior of all life forms.
- The arc of fire called Thiruvashi or Prabhavati signifies the cosmos and the perpetual motion of the earth.
- The drum in His hand signifies the origin of life forms.
- The lotus pedestal signifies Om, the sound of the universe.
- His right eye, left eye and third eye signify the sun, moon and fire/knowledge, respectively.
- His right earring (makara kundalam) and left earring (sthri kundalam) signifies the union between man and woman (right is man, left is woman).
- The crescent moon in His hair signifies benevolence and beauty.
- The flowing of river Ganges through His matted hair signifies eternity of life.
- The dreading of His hair and drape signify the force of His dance.

=== Bhakti movement ===
There is no reference to the temple in Sangam literature of the 1st to 5th centuries and the earliest mention is found in 6th-century Tamil literature. The temple and the deity were immortalized in Tamil poetry in the works of Thevaram by three poet saints belonging to the 7th century - Thirugnana Sambanthar, Thirunavukkarasar and Sundaramoorthy Nayanar. Thirugnana Sambanthar has composed 2 songs in praise of the temple, Thirunavukkarasar aka Appar 8 Tevarams in praise of Nataraja and Sundarar 1 song in praise of Nataraja. Sundarar commences his Thiruthondar thogai (the sacred list of Lord Shiva's 63 devotees) paying his respects to the priests of the Thillai temple - "To the devotees of the priests at Thillai, I am a devotee". The works of the first three saints, Thirumurai were stored in palm leaf manuscripts in the temple and were recovered by the Chola King Rajaraja Chola under the guidance of Nambiandarnambi.

Manikkavasagar, the 10th-century saivite poet has written two works, the first called Tiruvasakam (The sacred utterances) which largely has been sung in Chidambaram and the Thiruchitrambalakkovaiyar (aka Thirukovaiyar), which has been sung entirely in the temple. Manikkavasagar is said to have attained spiritual bliss at Chidambaram. The Chidambaram Mahatmiyam composed during the 12th century explain the subsequent evolution and de-sanskritization.

== Rituals ==
A unique feature of this temple is the bejewelled image of Lord Nataraja as the main deity. It depicts Lord Shiva as the master of Koothu-Bharata Natyam and is one of the few temples where Lord Shiva is represented by an anthropomorphic murthi rather than the classic, aniconic Lingam.

At Chidambaram, the dancer dominates, not the linga as in other Shiva shrines. The Chitsabha houses a small Spatika Lingam (Chandramoulisvara), believed to be a piece that fell from the crescent adorning Lord Shiva's head and installed by Adi Shankara. Daily puja is offered to the spatik linga (six times) and also to a small Ruby figure of Nataraja called Ratnasabhapati (once, at 10-30 am). The main sanctum also encloses Chidambara Rahasya - the divine chakra adorned with golden bilva leaves. This remains hidden, and only during the pooja times (six times a day) Rahasya Darshan will be offered to the devotees. Rahasya emanates the vastness and formlessness of Akash, the divinity that is the highest form of Supremacy (ether form of five elements).

== Festivals ==
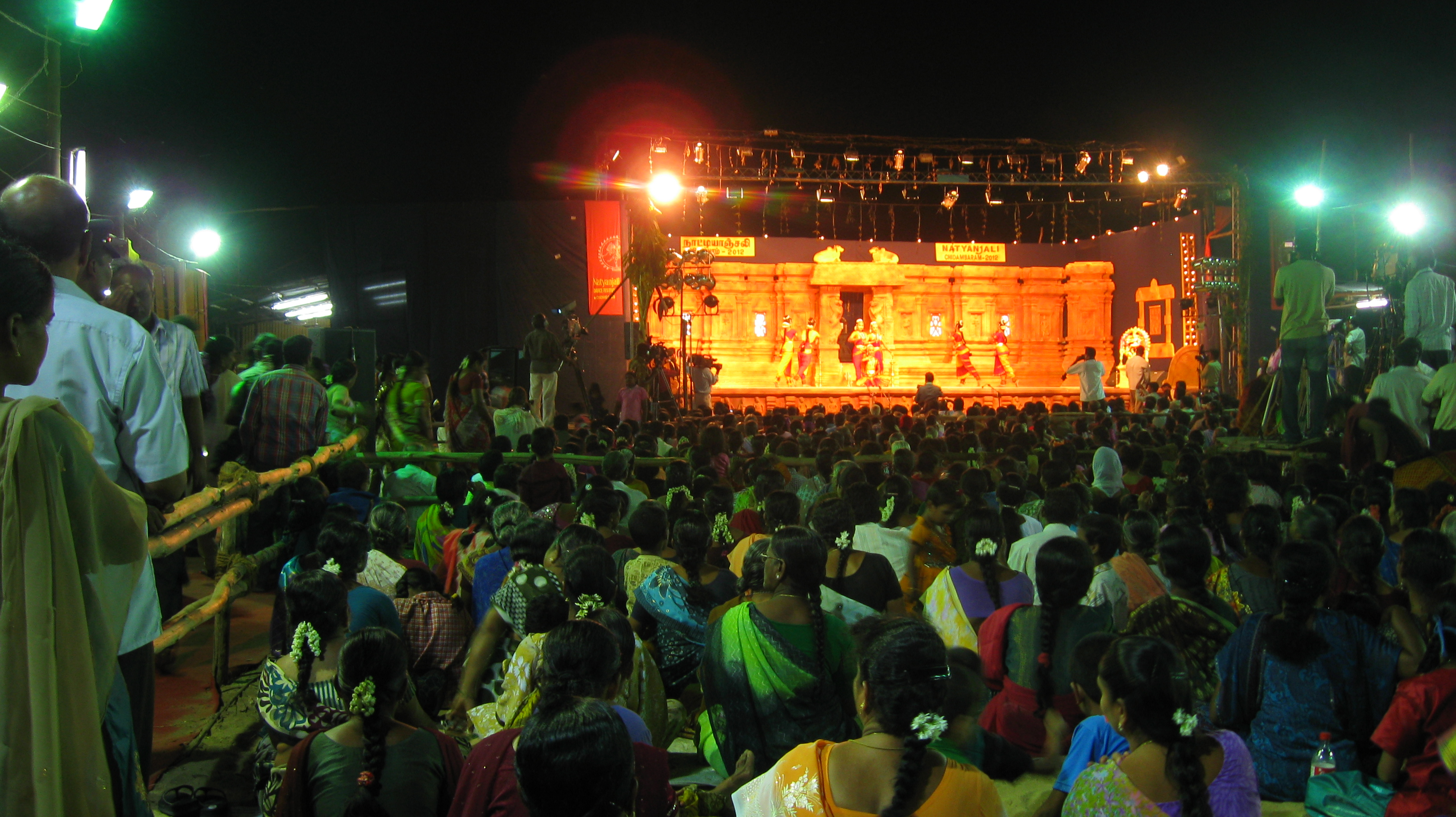
Natyanjali Festival in the temple

A whole year for men is said to be a single day for the gods. Just as six poojas are performed in a day at the sanctum sanctorum, six anointing ceremonies are performed for the principal deity – Nataraja in a year. They are the Marghazhi Thiruvaadhirai (in December–January) indicating the first puja, the fourteenth day after the new moon (Chaturdashi) of the month of Masi (February–March) indicating the second pooja, the Chittirai Thiruvonam (in April–May), indicating the third pooja or uchikalam, the Uthiram of Aani (June–July) also called the Aani Thirumanjanam indicating the evening or the fourth puja, the chaturdasi of Aavani (August–September) indicating the fifth puja and the chaturdasi of the month of Puratasi (October–November) indicating the sixth pooja or Arthajama. Of these the Marghazhi Thiruvaadhirai (in December–January) and the Aani Thirumanjanam (in June–July) are the most important. These are conducted as the key festivals with the main deity being brought outside the sanctum sanctorum in a procession that included a temple car procession followed by a long anointing ceremony. Several hundreds of thousands of people flock the temple to see the anointing ceremony and the ritualistic dance of Shiva when he is taken back to the sanctum sanctorum. Lord Shiva, in his incarnation of Nataraja, is believed to have been born on full moon day in the constellation of Ardra, the sixth lunar mansion. Lord Shiva is bathed only 6 times a year, and on the previous night of Ardra, the bath rituals are performed on a grand scale. Pots full of milk, pomegranate juices, coconut water, ghee, oil, sandal paste, curds, holy ashes, and other liquids and solids, considered as sacred offering to the deity are used for the sacred ablution.

== Administration ==
The temple was originally administered by an exclusive group of Brahmins who were called the Thillai Muvayiravar or the Three Thousand of Thillai. They were originally the ritual arbiters of imperial legitimacy in the Chola Empire, ritually crowning successive Chola monarchs. Kulottunga Chola I, during his rule, introduced priests from Vengi, his original homeland to perpetuate the myth of the Tillai three thousand in order to legitimize his royal and priestly power. Currently, the temple is managed by a community known as Dikshitars. They live in Chidambaram and also serve as the hereditary trustees of the temple. Every Dikshitar once he is married becomes as of right a trustee and archaka of the temple. A practice unique to the community is that the priests wear the tuft of hair in front of the head similar to the Nambuthiri Brahmans of Kerala.

== Bibliography ==
- Bajwa, Jagir Singh; Ravinder Kaur (2007). Tourism Management. New Delhi: S.B. Nangia. ISBN 978-81-313-0047-3.
- Prasanna Kumar Acharya (2010). An encyclopaedia of Hindu architecture. Oxford University Press (Republished by Motilal Banarsidass). ISBN 978-81-7536-534-6.
- Prasanna Kumar Acharya (1997). A Dictionary of Hindu Architecture: Treating of Sanskrit Architectural Terms with Illustrative Quotations. Oxford University Press (Reprinted in 1997 by Motilal Banarsidass). ISBN 978-81-7536-113-3.
- S.R. Balasubrahmanyam (1971), Early Chola Temples, Orient Longman, OCLC 221943844
- S.R. Balasubrahmanyam (1979), Later Chola Temples, Thomson Press, OCLC 6921015
- Vinayak Bharne; Krupali Krusche (2014). Rediscovering the Hindu Temple: The Sacred Architecture and Urbanism of India. Cambridge Scholars Publishing. ISBN 978-1-4438-6734-4.
- Alice Boner (1990). Principles of Composition in Hindu Sculpture: Cave Temple Period. Motilal Banarsidass. ISBN 978-81-208-0705-1.
- Alice Boner; Sadāśiva Rath Śarmā (2005). Silpa Prakasa. Brill Academic (Reprinted by Motilal Banarsidass). ISBN 978-8120820524.
- A.K. Coomaraswamy; Michael W. Meister (1995). Essays in Architectural Theory. Indira Gandhi National Centre for the Arts. ISBN 978-0-19-563805-9.
- Dehejia, V. (1997). Indian Art. Phaidon: London. ISBN 0-7148-3496-3.
- Adam Hardy (1995). Indian Temple Architecture: Form and Transformation. Abhinav Publications. ISBN 978-81-7017-312-0.
- Adam Hardy (2007). The Temple Architecture of India. Wiley. ISBN 978-0470028278.
- Adam Hardy (2015). Theory and Practice of Temple Architecture in Medieval India: Bhoja's Samarāṅgaṇasūtradhāra and the Bhojpur Line Drawings. Indira Gandhi National Centre for the Arts. ISBN 978-93-81406-41-0.
- Harle, J.C., The Art and Architecture of the Indian Subcontinent, 2nd edn. 1994, Yale University Press Pelican History of Art, ISBN 0300062176
- Monica Juneja (2001). Architecture in Medieval India: Forms, Contexts, Histories. Orient Blackswan. ISBN 978-8178242286.
- Stella Kramrisch (1976). The Hindu Temple Volume 1. Motilal Banarsidass (Reprinted 1946 Princeton University Press). ISBN 978-81-208-0223-0.
- Stella Kramrisch (1979). The Hindu Temple Volume 2. Motilal Banarsidass (Reprinted 1946 Princeton University Press). ISBN 978-81-208-0224-7.
- Michael W. Meister; Madhusudan Dhaky (1986). Encyclopaedia of Indian temple architecture. American Institute of Indian Studies. ISBN 978-0-8122-7992-4.
- Ca Ve, Ppiramaṇiyan̲; G., Rajendran (1985). Heritage of the Tamils: temple arts. International Institute of Tamil Studies. "the hymnists as Tillai came to be universally accepted as the place where the Lord dances in the Hall of Gold - Pon Ambalam"
- Pal, Pratapaditya (1988). Indian Sculpture: 700-1800 By Los Angeles County Museum of Art. University of California Press. ISBN 9780520064775.
- G., Vanmikanathan (1971). Pathway to God through Tamil literature, Volume 1. Delhi Tamil Sangam Publication.
- Pillai, M. Rajamanickam (1964). The development of Śaivism in South India, A.D. 300-1300. Dharmapuram Adhinam.
- Ramaswamy, Vijaya (2007). Historical dictionary of the Tamils. United States: Scarecrow Press, INC. ISBN 978-0-470-82958-5.
- Reddy, G.Venkatramana (2013). Alayam - The Hindu temple - An epitome of Hindu Culture. Mylapore, Chennai: Sri Ramakrishna Math. p. 31. ISBN 978-81-7823-542-4.
- Knapp, Stephen (2005). The Heart of Hinduism: The Eastern Path to Freedom, Empowerment and Illumination. NE: iUniverse. ISBN 978-0-595-35075-9.
- M.K.V., Narayan (2007). Flipside of Hindu Symbolism: Sociological and Scientific Linkages in Hinduism. California: Fultus Corporation. ISBN 978-1-59682-117-0.
- Kamalabaskaran, Iswari (1994). The light of Arunachaleswarar. Affiliated East-West Press Pvt. Ltd.
- Spear, Heidi (2011). The Everything Guide to Chakra Healing: Use Your Body's Subtle Energies to promote Health, Healing and Happiness. USA: Adams Media. ISBN 978-1-4405-2649-7.
- Hüsken, Ute; Will Sweetman (2009). Viṣṇu's children: prenatal life-cycle rituals in South India By. Germany: otto Harrassowitz GmbH & Co.KG, Wiesbaden.
- Aiyangar, Krishnaswami S. (1991). South India and Her Muhammadan Invaders. New Delhi: Asian Educational Services. ISBN 81-206-0536-5.
- Ayyar, PV Jagadisa (1993), South Indian Shrines, Asian Educational Services, ISBN 81-206-0151-3
- Ayyangar, Sreenivasa C.R. (1908). The life and teachings of Sri Ramanujacharya. Madras: R. Venkateshwar & Co.
- K.R., Sundararajan; Bithika Mukerji (2003). Hindu spirituality: Postclassical and modern. USA: Cross Road Publishing Company. ISBN 81-208-1937-3.
- Dubey, D. P. (2003). Rays and ways of Indian culture. New Delhi: M.D. Publishing Pvt. Ltd. ISBN 81-85880-98-0.
- Harle, J.C (1994), The Art and Architecture of the Indian Subcontinent (2 ed.), Yale University Press Pelican History of Art, ISBN 0300062176
- Manninezhath, Thomas (1993). Harmony of religions: Vedānta Siddhānta samarasam of Tāyumānavar. New Delhi: Motilalal Banarsidass Publishers Private Limited. ISBN 81-208-1001-5.
- Glory of India. Vol. 8. Motilal Banarsidass. 1984.
- Michell, George (1995), Architecture and art of southern India: Vijayanagara and, Volume 1, Issue 6, New York: Cambridge University Press, ISBN 0-521-44110-2
- Adalvallan - Encyclopaedia of Adalvallan in Puranas, - Yantras, Poojas- Silpa and Natya Sastras, compiled by Adheena Mahavidhvan Sri S Dhandapani Desikar, and published by The Thrivavaduthurai Adheenam, Saraswathi Mahal Library and Research Centre, Thiruvavaduthurai, Tamil Nadu, India 609803
- Kulke, Hermann; Dietmar Rothermund (2004). A History of India. Oxon: Routledge. ISBN 0-415-32920-5.
- Jones, Constance; James D. Ryan (2007). Encyclopedia of Hinduism. New York: Facts On File, Inc. ISBN 978-0-8160-5458-9.
- National Geographic (2008). Sacred Places of a Lifetime: 500 of the World's Most Peaceful and Powerful Destinations. United States: National Geographic Society. ISBN 978-1-4262-0336-7.
- Onwumechili, C. Agodi (1997). The equatorial electrojet. Amsterdam: Overseas Publishers Association. ISBN 90-5699-069-1.
- Encyclopædia Britannica (India) (2000). Students' Britannica India, Volumes 1-5. Hong Kong: Encyclopædia Britannica Inc. ISBN 0-85229-760-2.
- Southern Circle (1903). Epigraphy. Madras: Archaeological Survey of India.
- Dehejia, Vidya (1990). Art of the imperial Cholas. USA: Columbia University Press. ISBN 0-231-07188-4.
- Vidya Dehejia (2007). Chola: Sacred Bronzed of Southern India. Harry N. Abrams. ISBN 978-1-903973-83-7.
- Caṇmukam Meyyappan (1992). Chidambaram Golden Temple. Manivasagar Pathippagam.
- Sastri, Natesa; S. M. Natesa Sastri (2003). Hindu feasts, fasts and ceremonies. New Delhi: Asian Educational Services. ISBN 81-206-0402-4.
- Kodayanallur Vanamamalai, Soundara Rajan (2001). Concise classified dictionary of Hinduism. New Delhi: Concept Publishing Company. ISBN 81-7022-857-3.
- Anand, Swami P.; Swami Parmeshwaranand (2004). Encyclopedia of the Śaivism. New Delhi: Sarup & Sons. ISBN 81-7625-427-4.
- Subramuniyaswami, Satguru Sivaya (2004). Merging with Śiva: Hinduism's contemporary metaphysics. USA. ISBN 978-0-945497-99-8.
- Storl, Wolf-Dieter (2004). Shiva: the wild God of power and ecstasy. USA: Inner Traditions. ISBN 978-1-59477-780-6.
- T. A. Gopinatha Rao (1993). Elements of Hindu iconography. Motilal Banarsidass. ISBN 978-81-208-0878-2.
- Ajay J. Sinha (2000). Imagining Architects: Creativity in the Religious Monuments of India. University of Delaware Press. ISBN 978-0-87413-684-5.
- Burton Stein (1978). South Indian Temples. Vikas. ISBN 978-0706904499.
- Burton Stein (1989). The New Cambridge History of India: Vijayanagara. Cambridge University Press. ISBN 978-0-521-26693-2.
- Burton Stein; David Arnold (2010). A History of India. John Wiley & Sons. ISBN 978-1-4443-2351-1.
- Kapila Vatsyayan (1997). The Square and the Circle of the Indian Arts. Abhinav Publications. ISBN 978-81-7017-362-5.
