= Chidambara Rahasiyam =

Hindu religious belief

Chidambara Rahasiyam (transl. secret of Chidambaram) is a Hindu belief that there is a secret message conveyed through the embossed figure near the shrine of Shiva in the Chidambaram Temple.

Since ancient times, it is believed by some that this is the place where Shiva and his consort Parvati are present, but invisible to most people. In the temple, according to those who hold this belief, the Chidambara Rahasiyam is hidden behind a curtain (symbolic of Maya). Worship, or darshana, is possible only when priests open the curtain for special pujas. Behind the curtain are golden leaves, as from the Aegle Marmelos tree, signifying the presence of Shiva and Parvati. It is believed that saints can see the gods in their physical form.
