= Govindaraja Perumal Temple =

Perumal temple in Cuddalore district, Tamil Nadu, India

Govindaraja Swamy temple
- Thiruchitrakoodam
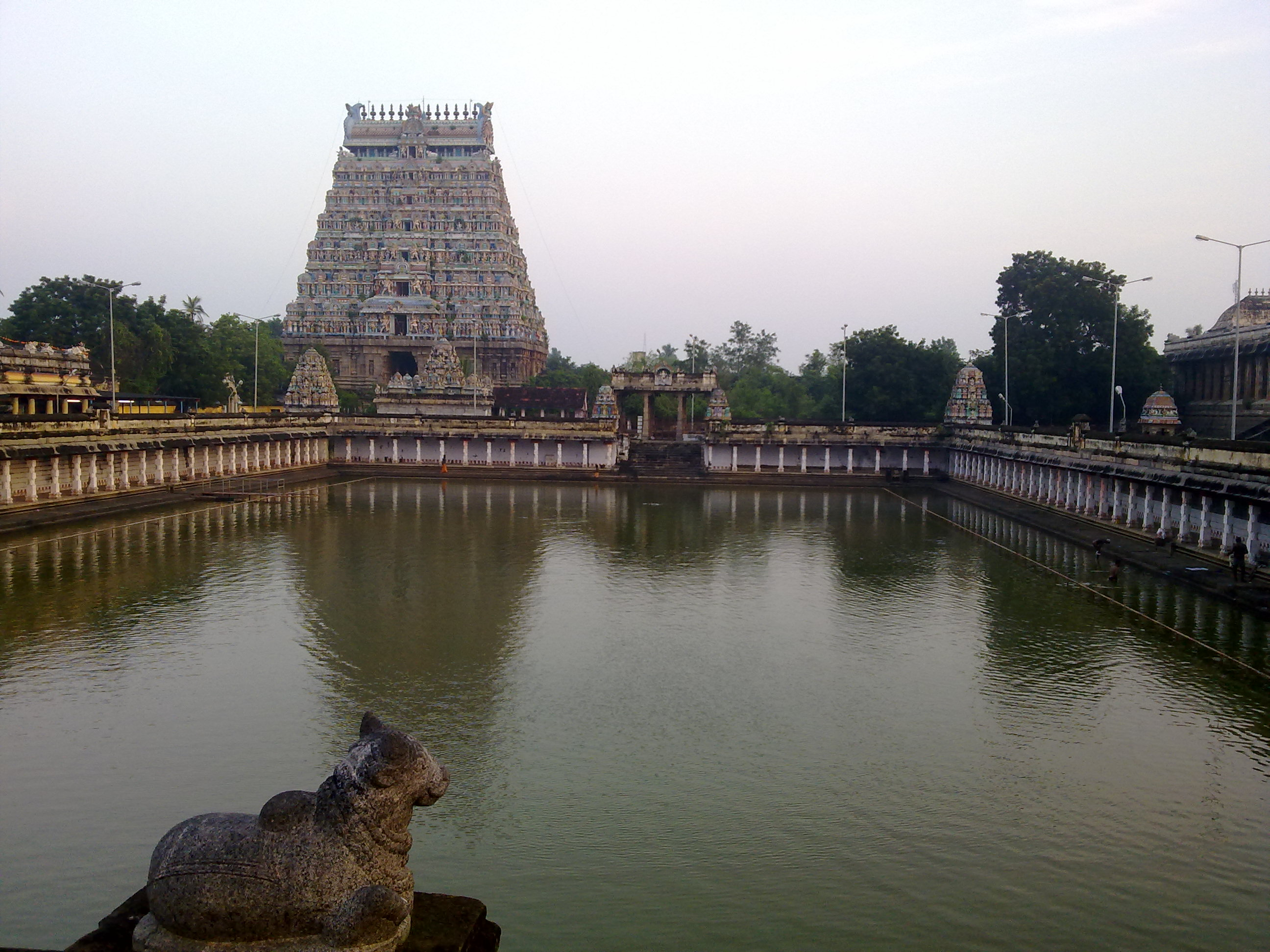

- Location in Tamil Nadu

Religion
- Affiliation: Hinduism
- District: Cuddalore District
- Deity: Govindaraja Perumal (Vishnu); Pundarikavalli Thayar (Lakshmi)

Location
- Location: Chidambaram
- State: Tamil Nadu
- Country: India
- Coordinates: 11°23′58″N 79°41′36″E

Architecture
- Type: Tamil architecture

The Govindaraja Perumal Temple, also called Thiruchitrakoodam, is a temple situated in Chidambaram, a town in the South Indian state of Tamil Nadu. Dedicated to the Hindu god Vishnu, the temple is inside the premises of the Thillai Nataraja Temple, constructed in the Dravidian architecture. The temple is glorified in the Naalayira Divya Prabandham, the early medieval Tamil canon of the Alvar saints from the 6th–9th centuries CE. It is one of the 108 Divya Desam dedicated to Vishnu, who is worshipped as Govindaraja Perumal and his wife Lakshmi as Pundarikavalli Thayar.

Also significant as a major shrine of Shiva worship since the classical period, there have been several renovations and offerings to Chidambaram by the Pallava, Chola, Pandya, Vijayanagara, and Chera royals in the ancient and pre-medieval periods. The temple as it stands now is mainly of the 12th and 13th centuries, with later additions in similar style.

The Govindaraja idol is believed to have been uprooted outside the temple complex during the period of Kulothunga Chola II. The Govindaraja idol was later found and reinstated by the king Krishnappa Nayak (1564–1572).

Six daily rituals and two major yearly festivals are held at the temple, of which the Chittirai festival, celebrated during the Tamil month of Chittirai (March–April), is the most prominent. The temple is maintained and administered by the Hindu Religious and Endowment Board of the Government of Tamil Nadu.

== Legend ==
Chidambaram is one of the many temple towns in the state which is named after the grooves, clusters or forests dominated by a particular variety of a tree or shrub and the same variety of tree or shrub sheltering the presiding deity. The town used to be called Thillai, following Thillaivanam, derived from the mangrove of Tillai trees (Exocoeria agallocha) that grow here and the nearby Pichavaram wetlands. According to a Hindu legend, once Shiva and Parvati wanted to judge who among them was a better dancer, and wanted their sons Vinayaka and Murugan to judge their performances. Both of them judged in favour of Parvati, after which Shiva was not satisfied. He wanted Brahma to judge, and the competition was held in Thiruvalangadu. Brahma was still not satisfied, and he wanted Vishnu to judge, and the latter wanted the competition in Tillaivanam. Shiva performed the Urthvathandavam pose of picking his earring with his legs, and wearing them in the ear with his legs. Parvati was not able to perform the feat, and due to her frustration at her defeat, became Kali at the Thillai Kali temple.

== History ==
The Govindaraja shrine is dedicated to Vishnu and is one of the 108 holy temples of Vishnu called Divya Desam, revered by the 6th-9th-century saint poets of the Vaishnava (Vishnu-centric) tradition, the Alvars. Kulashekara Alvar mentions this temple as Tillai Chitrakutam, and equates Chitrakuta of Ramayana fame with this shrine.

The Kannada origin Vengi Chalukya descended King Kulothunga Chola II is believed to have uprooted the presiding Govindaraja image from the shrine. Kulothunga was a Kalamukha Shaiva king, and he wanted to establish the supremacy of Kalamukha Shaivism by destroying Sri Vaishnava temples and killing Sri Vaishnavas. The shrine has close connections with the Govindaraja temple in Tirupati, dating back to the saint Ramanuja of the 11-12th century. The Vadamal born Ramanuja fled to Tirupati with the utsava (festival image) of the temple to escape persecution.

In the 16th century, king Krishnappa Nayak was instrumental in installing the image of Govindaraja back in the temple. There was a lot of resistance from those belonging to the Shaiva (Shiva-centric) tradition against reestablishing the Vishnu image in what had become a revered Shiva temple, but the king was unmoved, and the image was installed in the present form. There is no satisfactory evidence of co-existence of the Shiva and Vishnu shrines within the same temple built during the same time – there was a dispute in 1849 regarding the rights on the Govindaraja idol and Alvar Sannidhi (sanctum of Alvars) between Vaishnavas and Dikshitars, and the position of Vaishnavas was upheld by the district court.

== Religious significance ==
The temple is revered in Naalayira Divya Prabandham, the 6th–9th century Vaishnava canon, by Kulasekara Alvar in eleven hymns and Thirumangai Alvar in thirteen hymns. The temple is classified as a Divya Desam, one of the 108 Vishnu temples that are mentioned in the book. According to legend, Govindaraja is believed to have descended upon the earth for the sage Kanva and the 3,000 Dikshitars of the Thillai Natarajar temple. The temple is one of the two rare Divya Desams, with the other being Nilathingal Thundam Perumal temple, that are housed in a Shiva temple.
