= Chidambaram =

Town in Tamil Nadu, India

Chidambaram Thillai
- Town
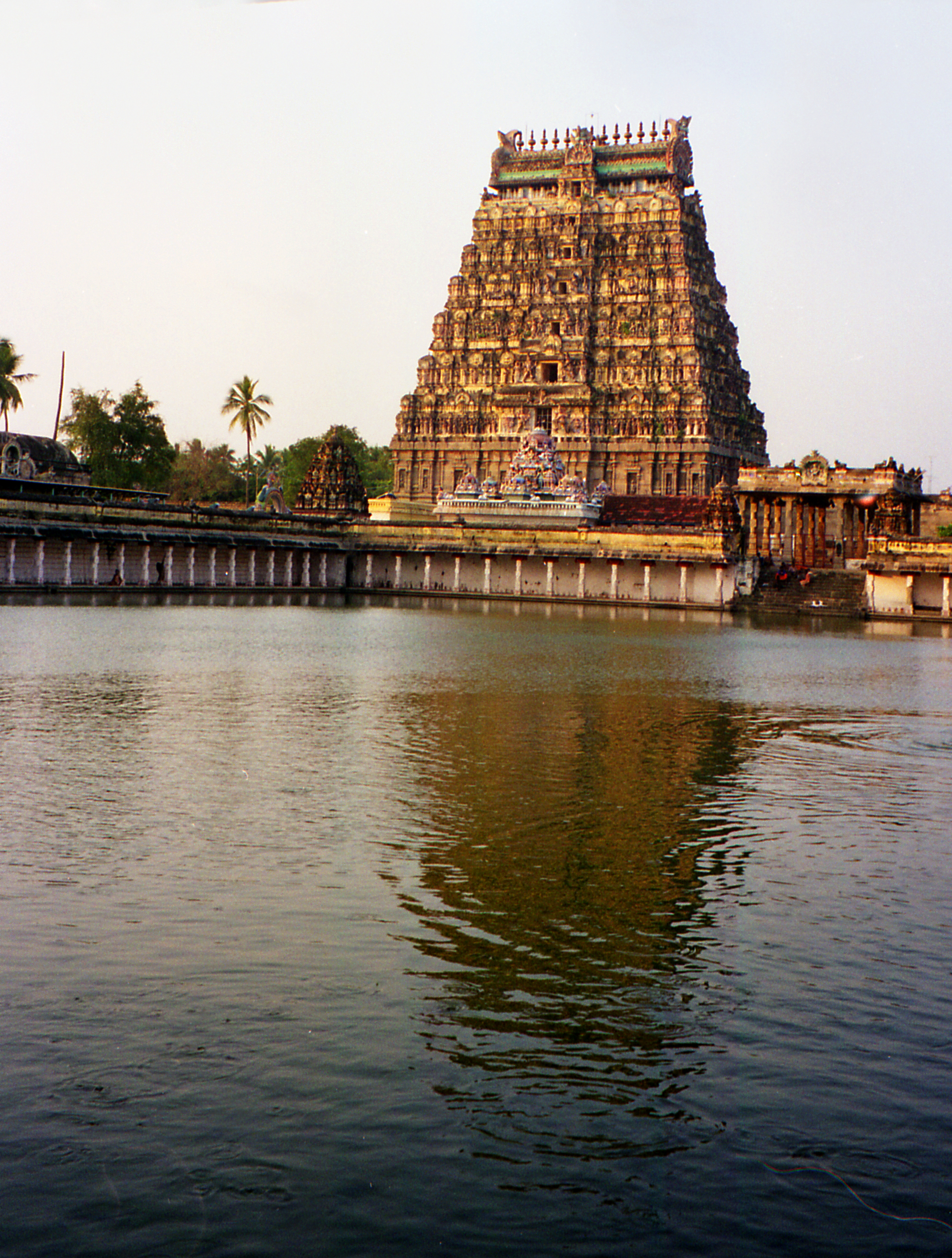
- Thillai Nataraja Temple
- Nickname: Temple City
- Chidambaram, Tamil Nadu Chidambaram (India)
- Coordinates: 11.407000°N 79.691200°E
- Country: India
- State: Tamil Nadu
- District: Cuddalore
- Region: Chola Nadu

Government
  - Type: Selective Grade Municipality
  - Body: Chidambaram Municipality
- Elevation: 31 m (102 ft)

Population (2011)
  - Total: 62,153
- Demonym: Chidambaran

Languages
  - Official: Tamil
- Time zone: UTC+5:30 (IST)
- PIN: 608001
- Telephone code: +91-4144
- Vehicle registration: TN-91
- Website: http://Cuddalore.tn.nic.in

Chidambaram (also known as Thillai) is a major town and municipality in Cuddalore district in the Indian state of Tamil Nadu, on the banks of the Vellar River where it meets the Bay of Bengal. It is the headquarters of the Chidambaram taluk. The town is believed to be of significant antiquity and has been ruled, at different times, by the Pallavas until ninth century, Medieval Cholas, Later Cholas, Later Pandyas, Vijayanagara Empire, Thanjavur Nayakas, Marathas and the British. The town is known for the Thillai Nataraja Temple and Thillai Kali Temple, and the annual chariot festival held in the months of December–January (In the Tamil month of Marghazhi known as "Margazhi Urchavam") and June to July (In the Tamil month of Aani known as "Aani Thirumanjanam"). One of the Divya Desams Divya Sri Govindaraja Perumal Temple (Thiruchitrakoodam) is a part of Thillai Nataraja Temple complex. Thiruvetkalam Shiva Temple, Vadakiruppu, Thirunelvayil Shiva Temple, Sivapuri and Tirukkazhippalai Palvannanathar Temple are the other three ancient Shiva temples in the region.

Chidambaram covers an area of 25.5 km^{2} (9.8 sq mi) and had a population of 1,15,913 as of 2011. It is administered by a Selective grade municipality. Tertiary sector involving tourism is the major occupation. Roadways are the major means of transportation with a total of 64.12 km (39.84 mi) of district roads including one national highway passing through the town. As of 2011, there were eleven government schools: six primary schools, three middle schools and two higher secondary schools in Chidambaram. Annamalai University, established in 1929 in Chidambaram, is one of the oldest and most prominent universities in the state.

== Etymology and legend ==
Chidambaram is one of the many temple towns in the state which is named after the groves, clusters or forests dominated by a particular variety of a tree or shrub and the same variety of tree or shrub sheltering the presiding deity. The traditional name of the temple complex, Chidambaram Thillai Nataraja-koothan Kovil. The mangrove forests of Thillai trees (Excoecaria agallocha) were abundant in the town once. The temple and the town were once in the midst of Thillai trees. The Thillai trees of the nearby Pichavaram wetlands, the second largest mangrove forest in the world, extends to the temple area. The shrine is venerated as Thillai ambalam literally meaning the open stage of Thillai. The name of the town of this shrine, chit ambara means 'ether of consciousness' or 'atmosphere of wisdom' in the Sanskrit Language. This composite word comes from its association with Nataraja (Shiva), the cosmic dancer and the cultural atmosphere for arts.

According to Hindu legend, in the Thillai forests resided a group of sages who believed in the supremacy of magic — that the gods could be controlled by rituals and mantras. Shiva, hearing this, assumed the form of Bhikshatana, a simple mendicant seeking alms, and went walking in Thillai. He was followed by his consort, Vishnu as Mohini. The sages and their wives were enchanted by the beauty of the pair. On seeing their womenfolk enchanted, the angry sages performed a ritual to create serpents (nāga). Shiva lifted the serpents and donned them as ornaments on his matted locks, neck and waist. Further enraged, the sages invoked a fierce tiger, whose skin was used by Shiva as a shawl around his waist. Then followed a fierce elephant, which was ripped to death and devoured by Shiva (an episode depicted in the Gajasurasamhara). The sages gathered all their spiritual strength and invoked the powerful demon Muyalakan — a symbol of complete arrogance and ignorance. Shiva smiled gently, stepped on the demon's back to immobilise him, and performed the Ánanda Thandavam (the dance of eternal bliss), thus disclosing his true form. The sages surrendered, realizing that rituals cannot control the gods.

== History ==
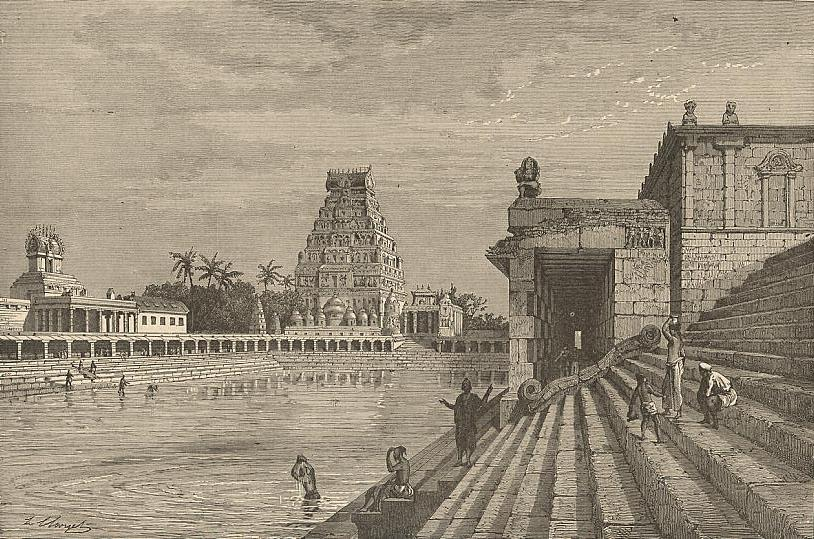
An image of the temple and the tank in 1870

There is reference to the temple or the town in Sangam literature of the first to fifth centuries and the earliest mention is found in Tamil literature. The temple and the deity were immortalized in Tamil poetry in the works of Thevaram by three poet-saints belonging to the seventh century - Thirugnana Sambanthar, Thirunavukkarasar and Sundaramoorthy Nayanar. Thirugnana Sambanthar has composed two songs in praise of the temple, Thirunavukkarasar aka Appar eight songs in praise of Nataraja and Sundarar one song in praise of Nataraja. Sundarar commences his Thiruthondar Thogai (the sacred list of Lord Shiva's 63 devotees) paying his respects to the priests of the Thillai temple - "To the devotees of the priests at Thillai, I am a devotee". The works of the first three saints, the Thirumurai were stored in palm leaf manuscripts in the temple and were recovered by the Chola King Rajaraja Chola under the guidance of Nambiandarnambi. Manikkavasagar, the tenth century saivite poet has written two works, the first called Thiruvasakam (The sacred utterances) which largely has been sung in Chidambaram and the Thiruchitrambalakkovaiyar (aka Thirukovaiyar), which has been sung entirely in the temple. Manikkavasagar is said to have attained spiritual bliss at Chidambaram. The Chidambaram Mahatmiyam composed during the 12th century provides the subsequent evolution and Sanskritization of cults.

There are several inscriptions available in the temple and referring to the Chidambaram temple in neighbouring areas. Most inscriptions available pertain to the periods of Cholas - Rajaraja Chola I (985-1014 CE), Rajendra Chola I (1012-1044 CE), Kulothunga Chola I (1070-1120 CE), Vikrama Chola (1118-1135 CE), Rajadhiraja Chola II (1163 -1178 CE), Kulothunga Chola III (1178-1218 CE) and Rajaraja Chola III (1216-1256 CE). Pandya inscriptions date from Thribhuvana Chakravarthi Veerapandiyan, Jataavarman Thribhuvana Chakravarthi Sundarapaandiyan (1251-1268 CE) and Maaravarman Thribhuvana Chakravarthi Veerakeralanaagiya Kulashekara Pandiyan (1268-1308 CE). Pallava inscriptions are available for king Avani Aala Pirandhaan Ko-perum-Singha (1216-1242 CE). Vijayanagara Kings mentioned in inscriptions are Veeraprathapa Kiruttina Theva Mahaaraayar (1509-1529 CE), Veeraprathaapa Venkata Deva Mahaaraayar, Sri Ranga Theva Mahaaraayar, Atchyutha Deva Mahaaraayar (1529-1542 CE) and Veera Bhooopathiraayar. One of the inscriptions from the descendant of Cheramaan Perumal Nayanar, Ramavarma Maharaja has been found.

In the north of India, the Indian subcontinent was conquered by the Delhi Sultanate. Muslim armies began raiding central India for plunder by the late 13th century. After subduing and extracting huge wealth along with promised annual tributes from the Marathas Yadavas of Devagiri in 1308, the Telugu Kakatiyas of Warangal in 1310 and the Kannada Hoysalas of Dwarasamudra in 1311, Sultan Ala ud Din Khalji's infamous eunuch Muslim general, Malik Kafur, and his Delhi Sultanate forces in 1311 went deeper into the Deccan peninsula for loot and to establish annual tributes to be paid by the Hindu kings. The records left by the court historians of the Delhi Sultanate state that Malik Kafur raided Chidambaram, Madurai, Srirangam, Vriddhachalam, Rameswaram and other sacred temple towns, destroyed the temples which were sources of gold and jewels. He brought back enormous loot from Dwarasamudra and the Pandya kingdom to Delhi in 1311.

== Geography and climate ==
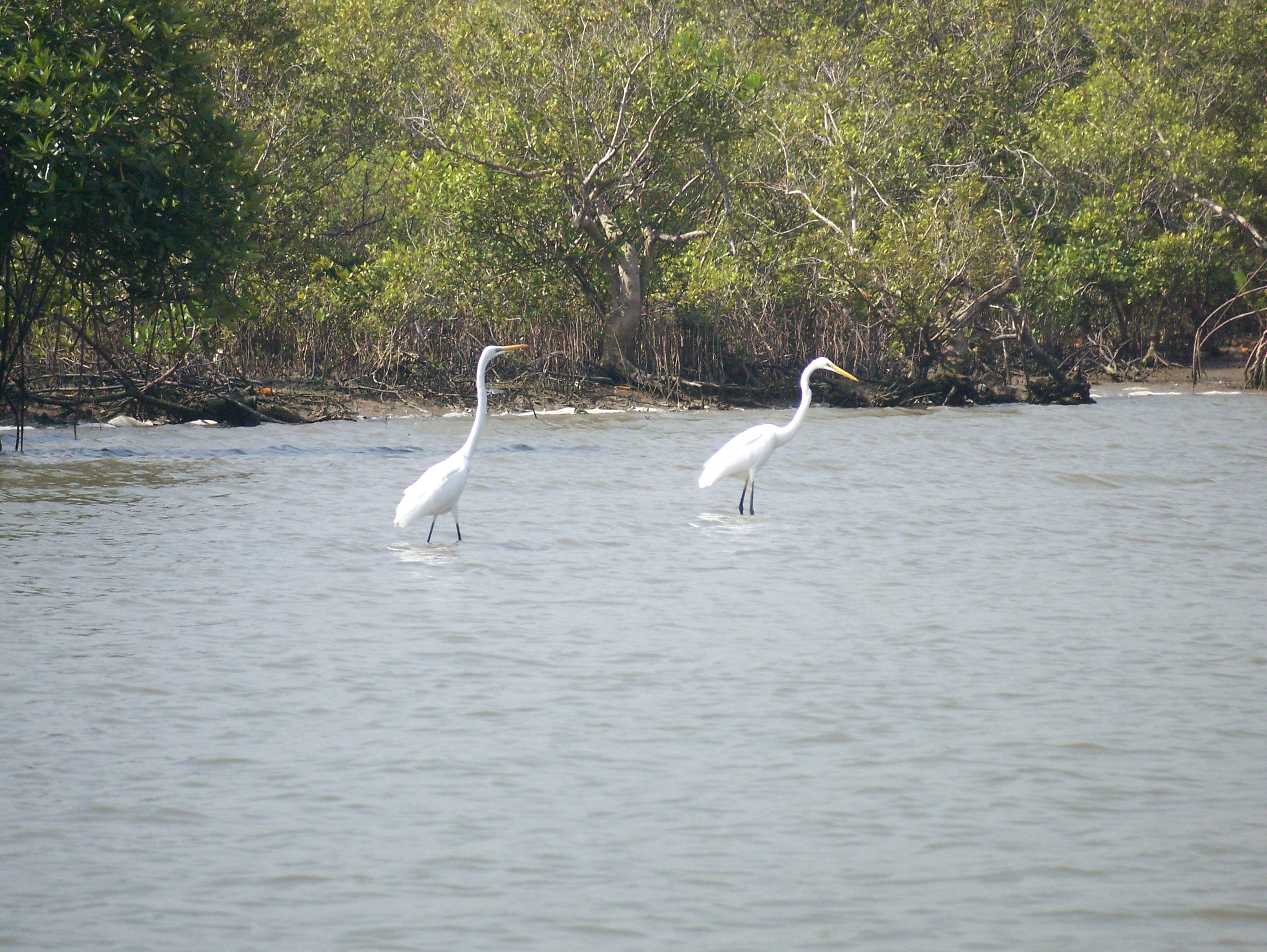
A set of Mangroove forests that are common in Chidambaram and Pichavaram

Chidambaram is located at 11.39°N 79.69°E. The town is located in Cuddalore district of the South Indian state, Tamil Nadu, 215 km (134 mi) from Chennai. Chidambaram is located close to the shores of Bay of Bengal. The topography is almost plain with forests around the town, with no major geological formation. There are no notable mineral resources available in and around the town. The soil types are alluvial and red that are conducive for crops like paddy, pulses and chili peppers. The temperature ranges from a maximum of 32.7 °C (90.9 °F) to a minimum of 24 °C (75 °F). Like the rest of the state, April to June are the hottest months and December to January are the coldest. Chidambaram receives an average of 10 mm (0.39 in) annually, which is lesser than the state average of 1,008 mm (39.7 in). The South west monsoon, with an onset in June and lasting up to August, brings scanty rainfall. Bulk of the rainfall is received during the North East monsoon in the months of October, November and December. The average number of rainy days ranges from 35 to 40 every year.

Climate data for Chidambaram, Tamil Nadu
Month	Jan	Feb	Mar	Apr	May	Jun	Jul	Aug	Sep	Oct	Nov	Dec	Year
Mean daily maximum °C (°F)	28.4 (83.1)	29.8 (85.6)	32.0 (89.6)	33.9 (93.0)	36.4 (97.5)	37.0 (98.6)	35.6 (96.1)	34.8 (94.6)	34.2 (93.6)	31.8 (89.2)	29.4 (84.9)	28.0 (82.4)	32.6 (90.7)
Mean daily minimum °C (°F)	21.1 (70.0)	21.7 (71.1)	23.4 (74.1)	25.8 (78.4)	27.0 (80.6)	26.8 (80.2)	26.2 (79.2)	25.4 (77.7)	25.2 (77.4)	24.3 (75.7)	23.0 (73.4)	21.7 (71.1)	24.3 (75.7)
Average precipitation mm (inches)	34 (1.3)	12 (0.5)	15 (0.6)	23 (0.9)	47 (1.9)	37 (1.5)	68 (2.7)	133 (5.2)	113 (4.4)	230 (9.1)	337 (13.3)	199 (7.8)	1,248 (49.2)
Source: Climate-Data.org

== Demographics ==
Religious census
Religion	Percent(%)
Hindu	89.73%
Muslim	8.22%
Christian	1.18%
Sikh	0.02%
Buddhist	0.01%
Jain	0.43%
Other	0.39%
No religion	0.02%

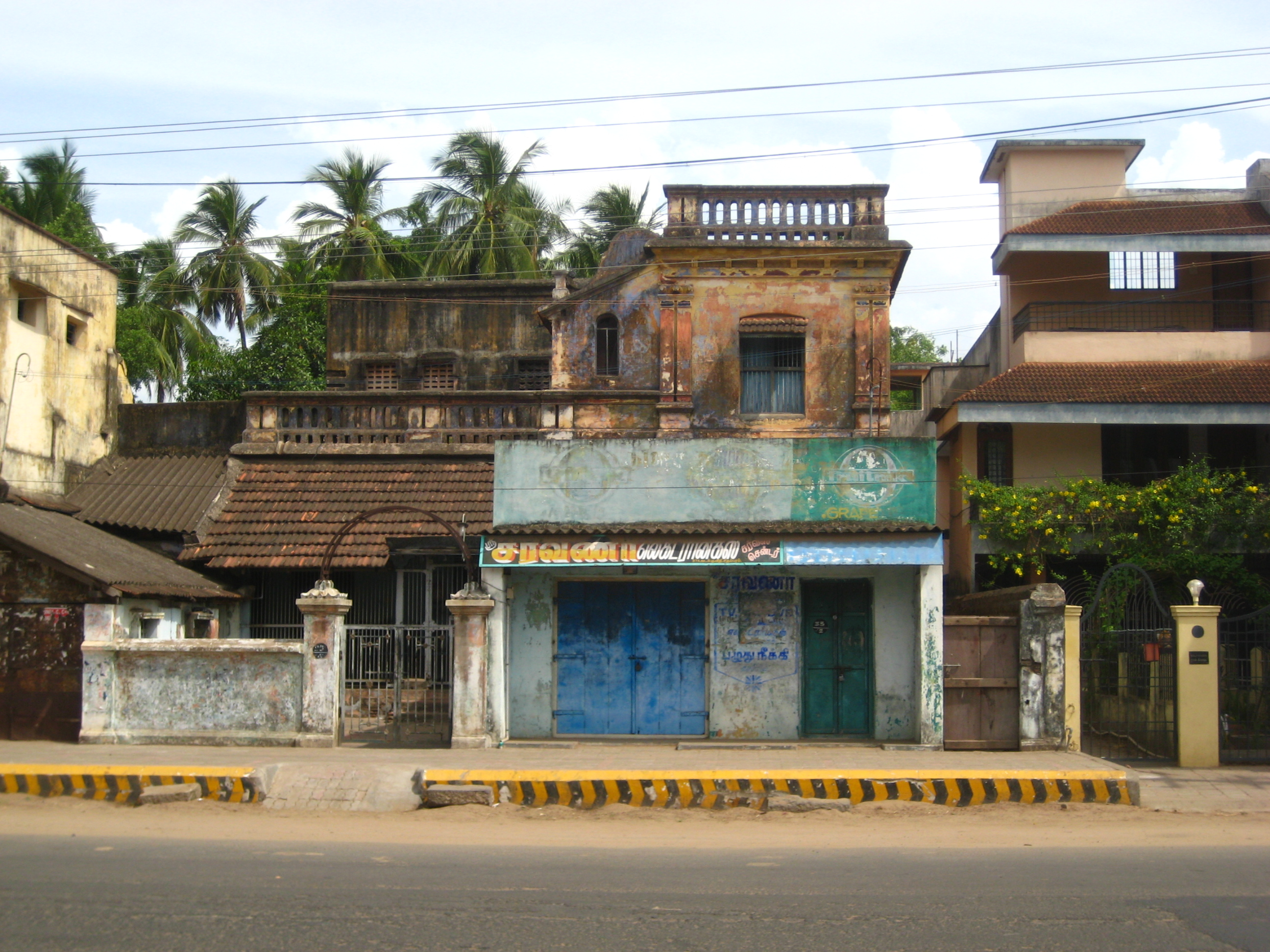
A vernacular house in Chidambaram

According to 2011 census, Chidambaram had a population of 62,153 with a sex-ratio of 1,032 females for every 1,000 males, much above the national average of 929. A total of 5,869 were under the age of six, constituting 2,990 males and 2,879 females. Scheduled Castes and Scheduled Tribes accounted for 6.81% and .09% of the population respectively. The average literacy of the city was 83.24%, compared to the national average of 72.99%. The city had a total of 15,166 households. There were a total of 22,194 workers, comprising 241 cultivators, 180 main agricultural labourers, 489 in household industries, 16,110 other workers, 5,174 marginal workers, 83 marginal cultivators, 213 marginal agricultural labourers, 401 marginal workers in household industries and 4,477 other marginal workers.

As of 2001, the town covered an area of 480 hectares (4.8 km^{2}). Out of the total area, 88 per cent of the land constituting 432 hectares (4.32 km^{2}) is marked developed and the remaining area is used for agriculture and remains under water. Residential areas make up 55 per cent (265.75 hectares (2.6575 km^{2})) of the town's total area while commercial enterprises and industrial units make up 5 per cent (23.62 hectares (0.2362 km^{2})) and 1 per cent (3.63 hectares (0.0363 km^{2})) respectively. As of 2008, there 31 notified slums having 3,954 houses in Chidambaram and a total of 17,102 people constituting 30 per cent of the total population lived in them. The municipality maintains the water supply and garbage collection of all these slums. As of 2001, nearly 5,000 people constituting 10 per cent of the population were below the poverty line. As per the religious census of 2011, Chidambaram had 89.73% Hindus, 8.22% Muslims, 1.18% Christians, 0.02% Sikhs, 0.01% Buddhists, 0.43% Jains, 0.39% following other religions and 0.02% following no religion or did not indicate any religious preference.

== Chidambaram temple ==
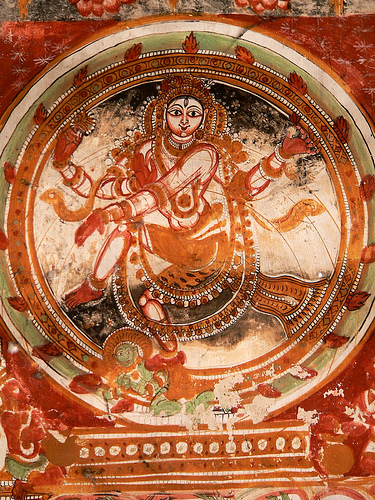
A fresco of Nataraja on the walls of the temple depicting the dance posture of the presiding deity

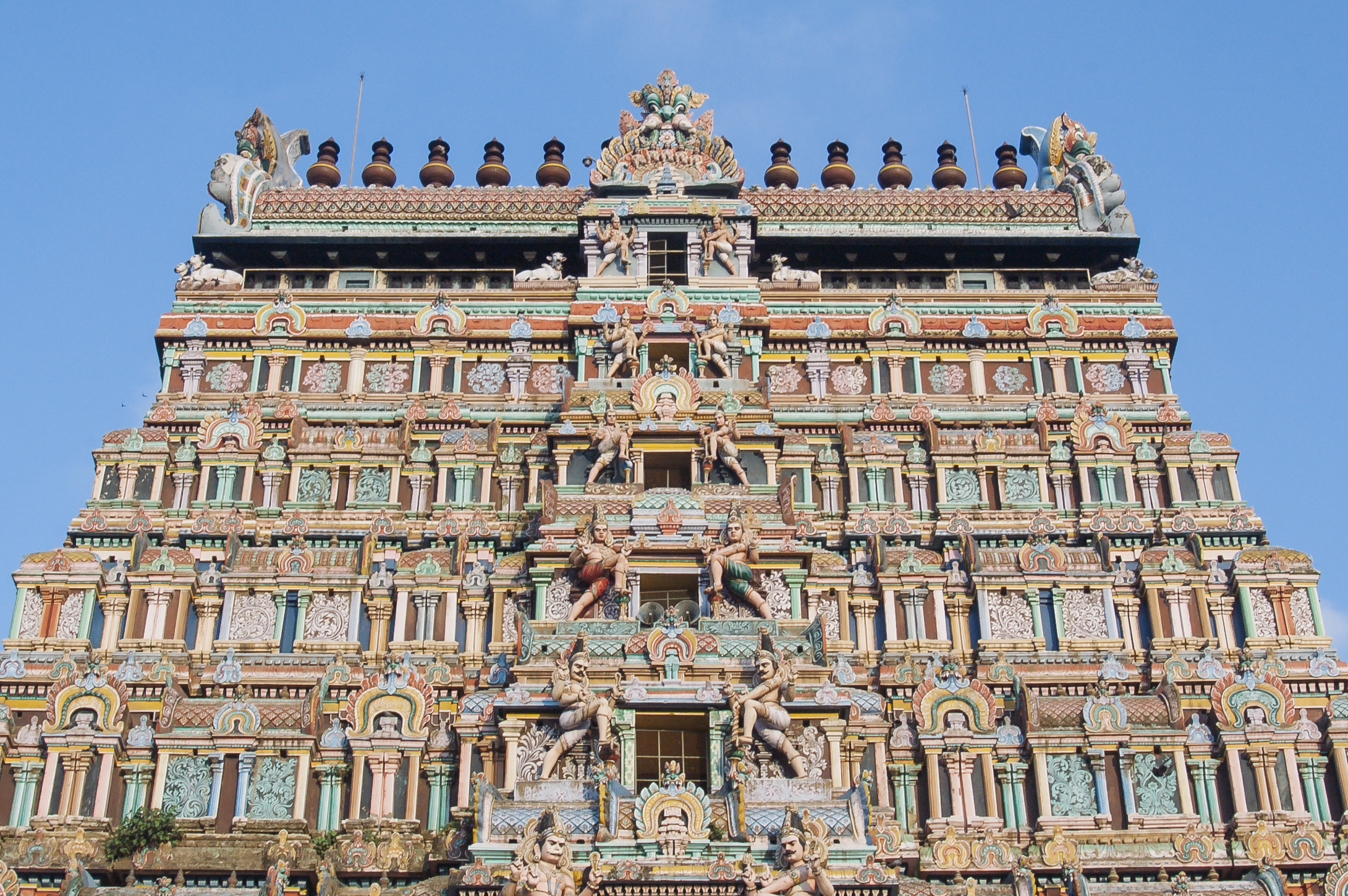
Nataraja Temple gopuram artwork in Chidambaram, Tamil Nadu

The temple complex is spread over an area of 40 acres (160,000 m^{2}) in the heart of the city. The main complex is dedicated to Shiva Nataraja and the complex contains shrines to deities such as Shivakami Amman, Ganesh, Murugan and Vishnu in the form Govindaraja Perumal. The temple's earliest structures were designed and erected by ancient craftsmen called Perunthakkan. The golden tiled roof for the Chitrambalam (the vimanam) was laid by the Chola King Parantaka I (907-950 CE) following which he was given the title "Thillaiyambalathhukku porkoorai veiyntha thevan", meaning the one who constructed the golden roof. Kings Rajaraja Chola I (reign 985-1014 CE) and Kulothunga Chola I (1070-1120 CE) made significant donations to the temple. Gold and riches to the temple were donated by Rajaraja Chola's daughter Kundavai II while Chola king Vikrama Chola (1118-1135 CE) made donations for the conduct of the daily rituals. Donations of gold and jewels have been made by various kings, rulers and patrons to the temple from 9th to 16th century —including the Maharaja of Pudukottai, Sethupathy (the emerald jewel still adorns the deity). Naralokaviran, the General of the king Kulothunga Chola I was responsible for building a shrine for child saint Thirugnana Sambanthar and installed a metal image inside it. He constructed a hall for the recitation of Thevaram hymns and engraved the hymns in copper plates.

== Economy ==
Tourism forms the economic base of Chidambaram. There are household industries like weaving is present within town limits, otherwise, there are no major industries in the town. As of 2001, the worker population constituted 18,249 people amounting to 31.6 per cent of the total population. Out of the total workforce, 16,059 constituting 88 per cent people were employed in the tertiary sector, 1,277 people constituting 7 per cent were involved in the secondary sector and 912 people constituting 5 per cent were involved in primary sector activities. The primary sector consists of local and regional marketing, with paddy being the primary traded product, followed by cereals, black gram, pulses, sugarcane and gingelly. The secondary sector activities consist of household activities and cane furniture manufacturing. The tertiary sector activities are the tourism-related activities centred on the Thillai Natarajar temple. The town has a floating population of around 100,000 every year being mainly religious tourists. Annamalai University, located in the outskirts of the town is also another major industrial driver. The town is a centre for trading for the surrounding villages, housing provisional stores, food grain stores, vegetable shops, hotels, markets and fertilizer shops.

== Education ==
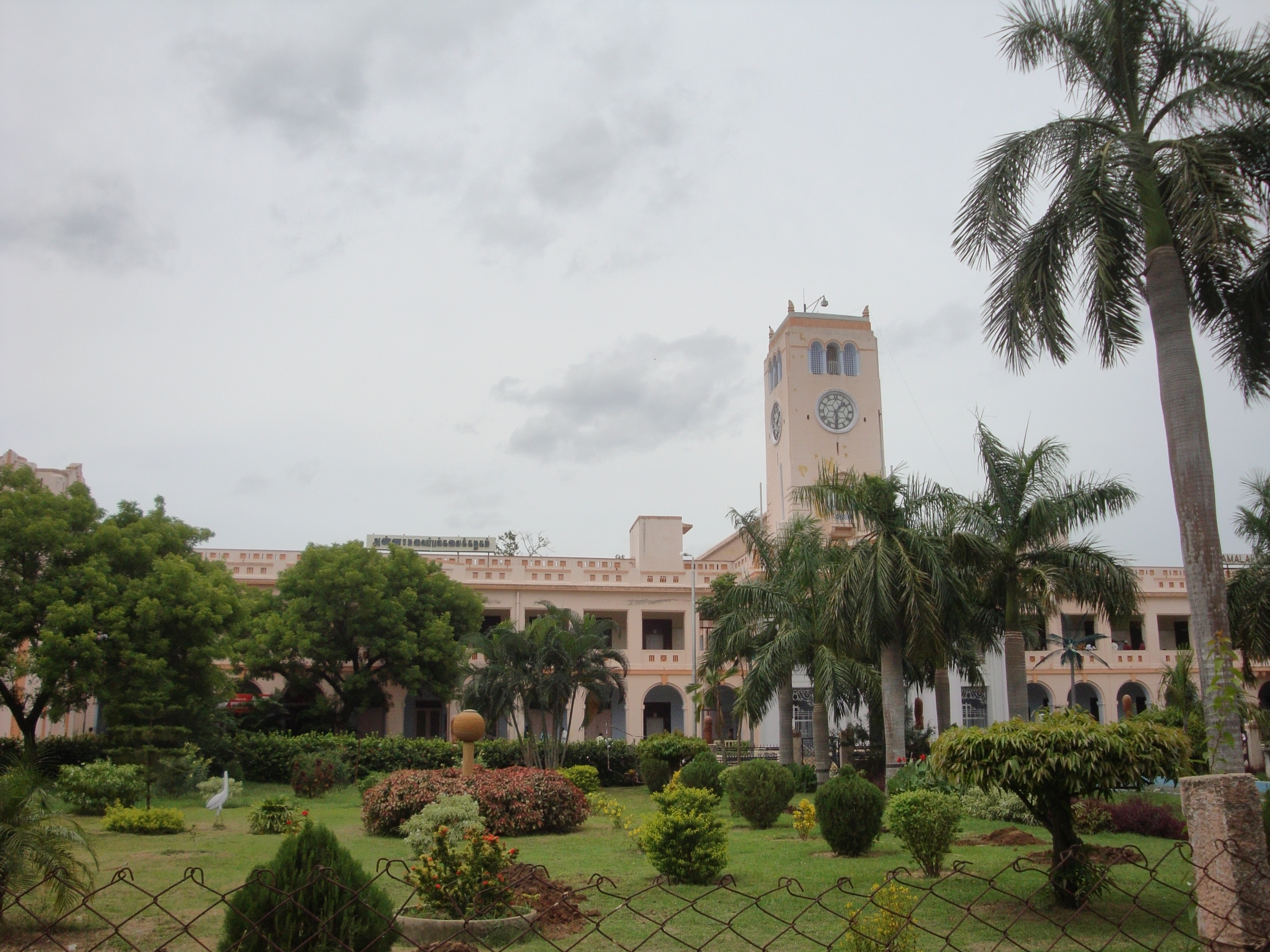
Annamalai University, established in 1929, is one of the oldest universities in the state

As of 2011, there were eleven government schools: six primary schools, three middle schools and two higher secondary schools in Chidambram. There were nine other private schools within the town. Chidambaram is home to the Annamalai University. Annamalai University is a public university located in Annamalai Nagar, Chidambaram, Tamil Nadu, India. Government Cuddalore Medical College, Rajah Muthiah Dental College, Muthiah Polytechnic College, Government Arts College, Ragavendra Arts and science college, C.S. Jain College of Pharmacy and Perunthalaivar Kamaraj Institute of Maritime and Science Engineering College(pkimsec) are some of the prominent colleges in the town.

== Utilities ==
Electricity supply to Chidambaram is regulated and distributed by the Tamil Nadu Electricity Board (TNEB). The town along with its suburbs forms the Cuddalore Electricity Distribution Circle. A Chief Distribution engineer is stationed at the regional headquarters. Water supply is provided by the Chidambaram Municipality from the two mini power pumps, borewells and Deep borwell located in various parts of the town. In the period 2000–2001, a total of 7.5 million litres of water was supplied every day for households in the town.

As per the municipal data for 2011, about 31 metric tonnes of solid waste were collected from Chidambaram every day by door-to-door collection and subsequently the source segregation and dumping was carried out by the sanitary department of the Chidambaram municipality. The coverage of solid waste management in the town by the municipality had an efficiency of 100% as of 2001. There is no underground drainage system in the town and the sewerage system for disposal of sullage is through septic tanks, open drains and public conveniences. The municipality maintained a total of 23.372 km (14.523 mi) of storm water drains in 2011. As of 2011, there was one government hospital namely Kamaraj Government Hospital, one municipal maternity home and 17 private hospitals and clinics that take care of the health care needs of the citizens. As of 2011, the municipality maintained a total of 1,856 street lamps: 339 sodium lamps, 1,500 tube lights and 17 high mast beam lamps. The municipality operates four markets, namely the Daily Market West Car street, Gnanaprakasam market, North Main road fish market and Omakulam fish market that cater to the needs of the town and the rural areas around it.

== Culture ==
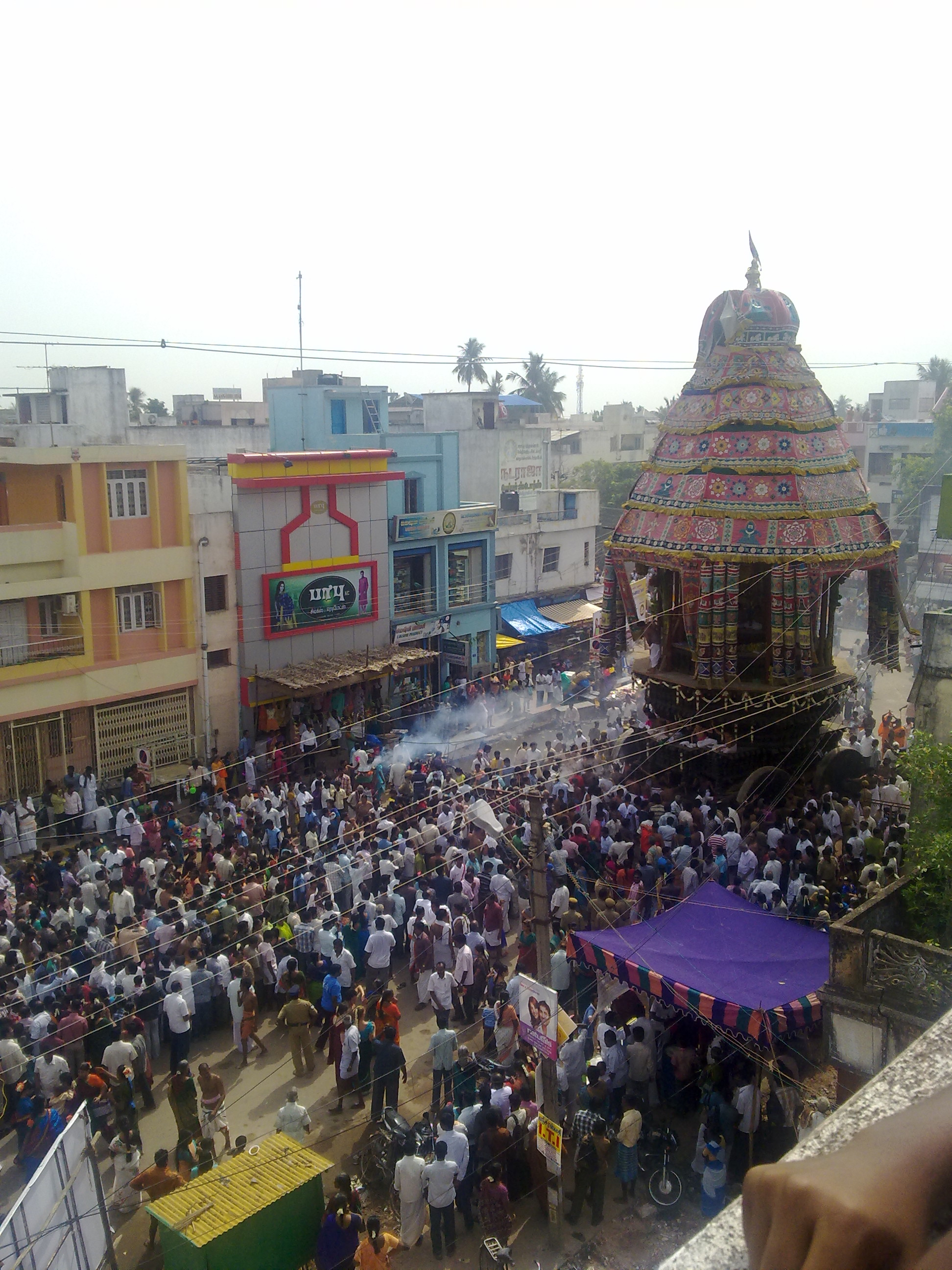
Ratha festival during 2011

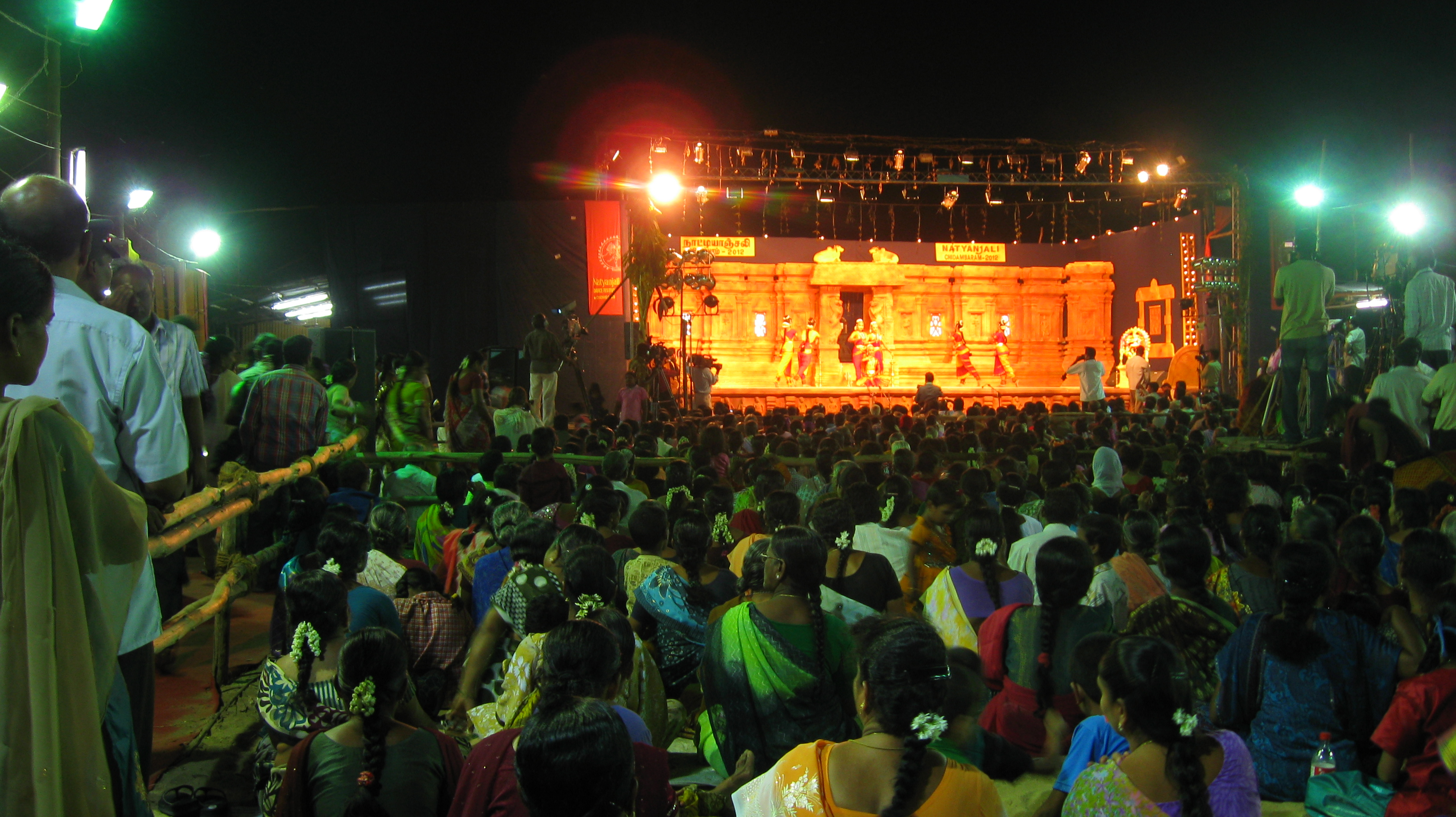
Natyanjali Festival in the temple

The festivals in Chidambaram are centred on the festivals of the temple. The Marghazhi Thiruvaadhirai festival celebrated in December–January indicates the first puja, the fourteenth day after the new moon (Chaturdashi) of the month of Masi (February–March) indicates the second pooja, the Chittirai Thiruvonam (in April–May), indicates the third pooja or uchikalam, the Uthiram of Aani (June–July) also called the Aani Thirumanjanam indicates the evening or the fourth puja, the chaturdasi of Aavani (August–September) indicates the fifth puja and the chaturdasi of the month of Puratasi (October–November) indicates the sixth pooja or Arthajama. Of these, the Marghazhi Thiruvaadhirai (in December–January) and the Aani Thirumanjanam (in June–July) are the most important festivals. During these festivals, the festive deity is brought outside the sanctum sanctorum in a procession that includes a temple car procession followed by a long anointing ceremony. Several hundreds of thousands of people flock the temple to see the anointing ceremony and the ritualistic dance of Shiva when he is taken back to the sanctum sanctorum. Shiva, in his incarnation of Nataraja, is believed to have been born on full moon day in the constellation of Ardra, the sixth lunar mansion. Lord Shiva is bathed only 6 times a year, and on the previous night of Ardra, the bath rituals are performed on a grand scale. Pots full of milk, pomegranate juices, coconut water, ghee, oil, sandal paste, curds, holy ashes, and other liquids and solids, considered as a sacred offering to the deity are used for the sacred ablution.

Natyanjali is a prominent festival celebrated during February every year when bharatanatyam dancers from all over the country converge to present dance offering to Nataraja.

== Notable people ==
- Appayya Dikshitar (1520-1593), Hindu Priest
- Venki Ramakrishnan (b. 1952), structural biologist and Nobel Prize laureate, born in Chidambaram.

== Municipal administration and politics ==
Chidambaram is administered by a selective-grade municipality formed as third-grade municipality in 1873, upgraded to a second-grade in 1949, first-grade in 1974 and a selection-grade in 1998. The municipality covers an area of 11.16 km^{2} (4.31 sq mi) and also the taluk headquarters. The Chidambaram municipality has 33 wards and there is an elected councillor for each of those wards. The functions of the municipality are devolved into six departments: general administration/personnel, Engineering, Revenue, Public Health, city planning and Information Technology (IT). All these departments are under the control of a Municipal Commissioner who is the executive head. The legislative powers are vested in a body of 33 members, one each from the 33 wards. The legislative body is headed by an elected chairperson assisted by a deputy chairperson.

Chidambaram comes under the Chidambaram assembly constituency and it elects a member to the Tamil Nadu Legislative Assembly once every five years. From the 1977 elections, All India Anna Dravid Munnetra Kazhagam (AIADMK) won the assembly seat five times (in 1980, 1984, 2006, 2016 and 2021 elections), five times by Dravida Munnetra Kazhagam (DMK, 1971, 1977, 1989, 2001 and 2026 elections) and once each by Communist Party of India (Marxist) (CPI(M), 2011 election), Indian National Congress (INC, 1991 elections) and Tamil Maanila Congress (TMC, 1996). The current MLA of the constituency is M. Thamimum Ansari (DMK).

Law and order in the town is maintained by the Chidambaram sub division of the Cuddalore district of Tamil Nadu Police headed by a Deputy Superintendent. There is one police station in the town located in West Car street.

== Transport ==
The Chidambaram municipality maintains 64.12 km (39.84 mi) of road. The town has 8.44 km (5.24 mi) concrete roads and 48.69 km (30.25 mi) bituminous road. A total of 5 km (3.1 mi) of state highways is maintained by the State Highways Department and 6 km (3.7 mi) by the National Highways Department. It is located at a distance of 223 km (139 mi) from Chennai, 335 km (208 mi) from Madurai, 375 km (233 mi) from Rameswaram, 340 km (210 mi) from Bengaluru. The national highway NH- 32 (the Chennai- Villupuram-Puducherry-Cuddalore-Chidambaram-Nagapattinam- Thoothukudi Highway) passes through Chidambaram and NH81 connects Chidambaram with Coimbatore through Kattumannarkoil, Tiruchirapalli and Karur. The Cuddalore road, Pitchavaram Road, Sirkazhi Road, Kattumanarkoil road and Old Bhuvanagiri road are the five main district roads connecting Chidambaram to other cities of Tamil Nadu.

Minibus service operated by private companies cater to the local transport needs. The main bus stand is located in the heart of the town and has 46 bus bays. The Tamil Nadu State Transport Corporation operates daily services connecting various cities such as Bengaluru, Madurai, Palani, Salem, Tindivanam, Kallakkurichi, Tiruvannamalai, Velankanni, Rameswaram, Tiruppur, Trichy, Perambalur, Karaikudi, Sivagangai, Paramakudi, Sayalkudi, Mudukulathoor, Panruti, Vriddhachalam, Erode, Mettur, Chennai, Puducherry, Viluppuram, Tirupathur and Neyveli with Chidambaram. The State Express Transport Corporation operates long-distance buses connecting the town to important cities like Chennai, Coimbatore, Trichy, Salem, Madurai, Tirunelveli, Nagercoil. Three wheelers, called autos, are also a common public transport system.

Chidambaram railway station is located in the rail line from Mayiladuthurai to Viluppuram. There are daily express trains to Chennai, Rameswaram, Tirupathi, Cuddalore and Manamadurai. There are passenger trains to Mayiladuthurai, Cuddalore, Villupuram, Nagore and Bengaluru.

Pondicherry Airport (PNY) is the nearest airport located around 66 kilometres north of Chidambaram, but Tiruchirappalli International Airport (TRZ) is the closest well-connected one, situated around 156 kilometres south-west of Chidambaram, while Chennai International Airport (MAA) serves as the primary regional hub.

== See also ==
- Divya Sri Govindaraja Perumal Temple (Thiruchitrakoodam)
- Thillai Kali Temple, Chidambaram
- Thiruvetkalam Shiva Temple, Vadakiruppu
- Thirunelvayil Shiva Temple, Sivapuri
- Tirukkazhippalai Palvannanathar Temple
- Pichavaram
- Chidambaranatha Soorappa Chozhanar
- Port Novo
- Veeramudayanatham

== Notes ==
=== Footnotes ===
- The municipalities in Tamil Nadu are graded special, selection, grade I and grade II based on income and population.
