= Sivapuri Uchinathar Temple =

Uchinathar Temple
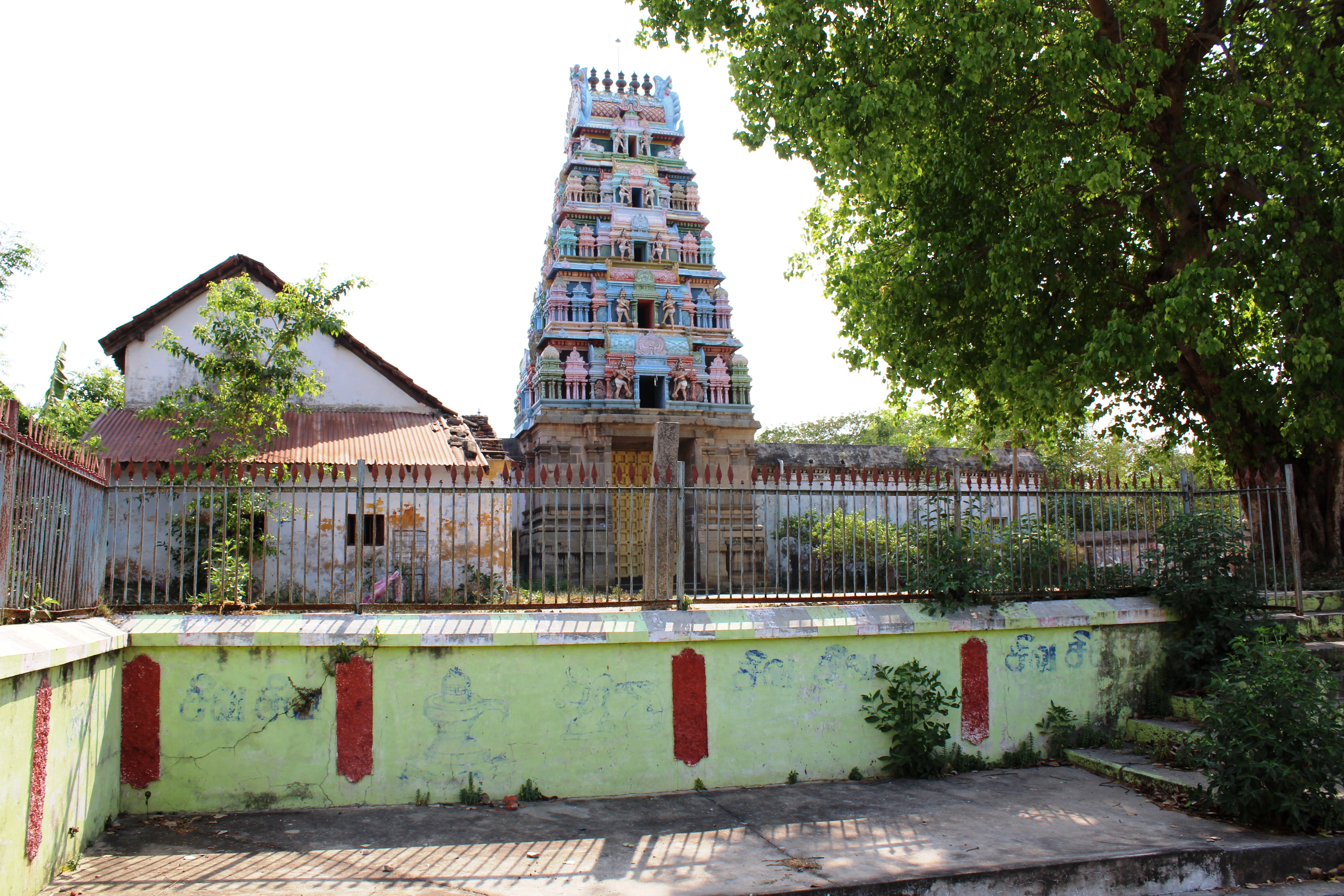

- Location in Tamil Nadu

Religion
- Affiliation: Hinduism
- District: Cuddalore
- Deity: Uchinathar (Shiva) and Uchinayagi (Parvati)

Location
- Location: Sivapuri Chidambaram
- State: Tamil Nadu
- Country: India
- Coordinates: 11°22′22.4″N 79°42′48.3″E

Architecture
- Type: South Indian Architecture

Sivapuri Uchinathar Temple (also called Thirunelvayil) is a Hindu temple in Sivapuri in Cuddalore district of Tamil Nadu, India. The place is also known as Thirunelvayil. The presiding deity is Shiva, known as Uchinathar. His consort is known as Uchinayagi.

The presiding deity is revered in the 7th century Tamil Saiva canonical work, the Tevaram. The temple complex covers an area of one acre and all its shrines are enclosed with concentric rectangular walls. The temple has a number of shrines, with those of Uchinathar and his consort Uchinayagi being the most prominent.

== Legend ==
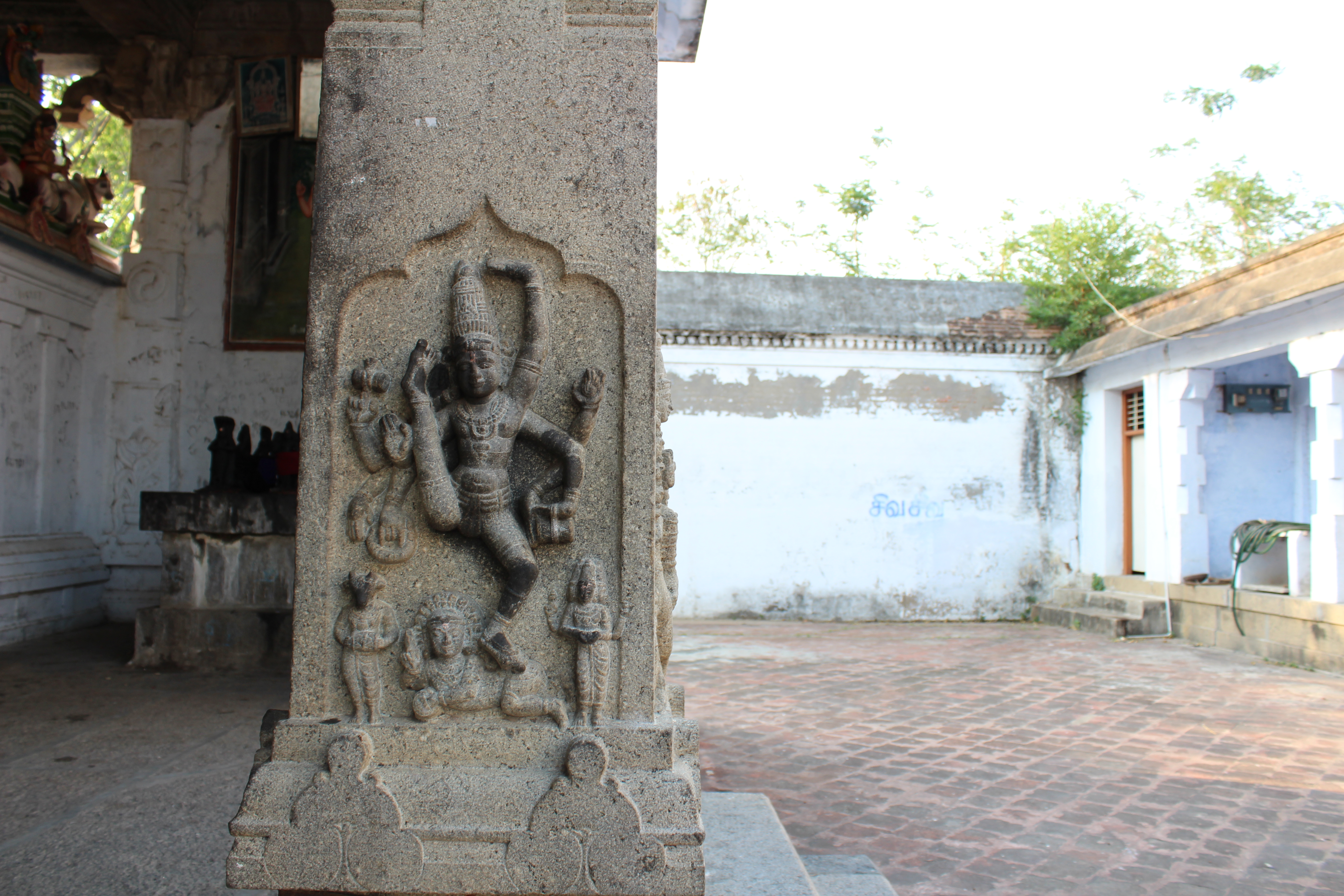
Sculpted image of Nataraja

As per Hindu legend, the god Shiva and his consort Parvati appeared to the sage Agastya at this place (the same legend is attributed to several Shiva temples in Tamil Nadu). The place is called Thirunelvayil as it is believed that it was surrounded by fresh rice fields during the time (nel in Tamil indicates paddy grain). As per another legend, saint poet Sambandar, who was born in Sirkali, was fed by Parvati with divine milk. The child grew up and visited various temples and sung praised of god. At the age of twelve, his marriage was arranged to be held at Achalpuram. The marriage party visited the place on the way to Achalpuram. The party was hungry and on account of divine intervention, food was offered. Sambandar started praising Shiva as Uchinathar (Madhyaneeswarar in Sanskrit). Periyapuranam, the 11th century compilation of the Nayanmars has details about Sambandar visiting the place after coming via Thillai Nataraja Temple and Thiruvetkalam.

== Architecture ==
Uchinathar temple is located in Sivapuri, a place 5 km (3.1 mi) from Chidambaram. The temple has a three tiered rajagopuram on the eastern side with concentric rectangular walls surrounding the temple. The sanctum is approached through a pillared hall called mukha mandapa and an artha mandapa. The shrine of the Ambal is located in the mukhamandapa facing south. The presiding deity in the form of lingam (an iconic form of Shiva) is located in the sanctum. It is believed that the image is self manifested. There is a panel on the wall behind the image that depicts the marriage of Shiva and Parvathi. There is a circumabulatory passage around the shrines. The pillars in the hall leading to the sanctum has sculpted images depicting various Hindu legends. The temple tank called Kripasamudram is located opposite to the temple. The temple was in dilapidated condition during the early part of 20th century and was rebuilt.

== Religious importance and festivals ==
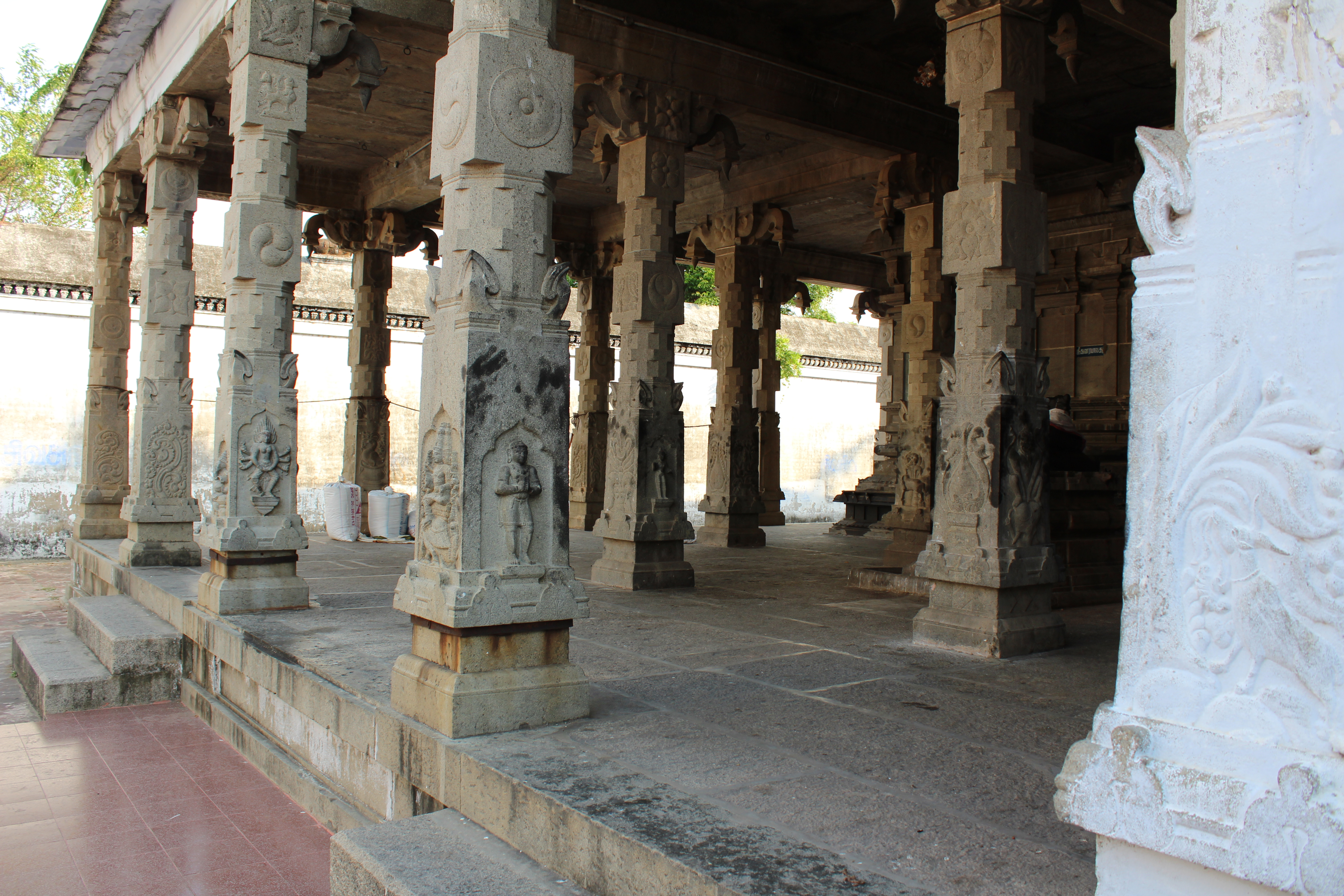
Pillared hall

Sambandar, an 8th-century Tamil Saivite saint poet, venerated Uchinathar in ten verses in Tevaram, compiled as the First Tirumurai. As the temple is revered in Tevaram, it is classified as Paadal Petra Sthalam, one of the 276 temples that find mention in the Saiva canon. The temple is counted as the third in the series of the temples on the northern bank of river Cauvery.
