= Veeramudayanatham =

- village
- Location in Tamil Nadu, India Veeramudayanatham (India)
- Coordinates: 11.26°N 79.30°E
- Country: India
- State: Tamil Nadu
- District: cuddalore

Languages
  - Official: Tamil
- Time zone: UTC+5:30 (IST)
- PIN: 608702
- Telephone code: 04144
- Vehicle registration: TN-31

Veeramudaiyanatham (syn: Veeranam) is a village in Cuddalore district in the Indian state of Tamil Nadu. It is located in near the vallaru(white river),25 km from chidambaram; 23 km from virudhachalam; 80 km from Pondicherry.

== Tourist attractions ==
- Gangaikonda Cholapuram

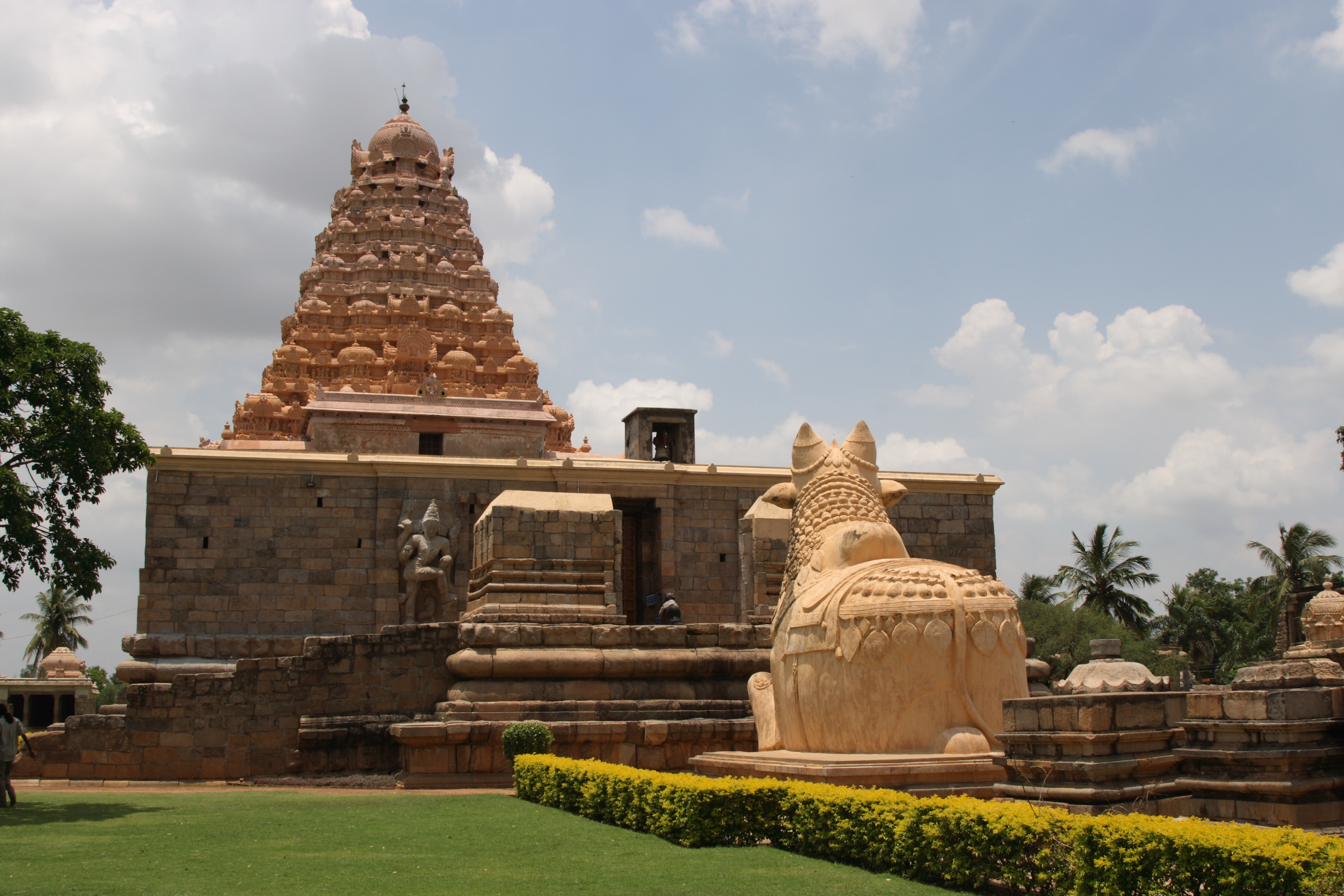
Temple at Gangaikonda Cholapuram

Gangaikonda Cholapuram (Tamil: கங்கைகொண்ட சோழபுரம்) was erected as the capital of the Cholas by Rajendra Chola I, the son and successor of Rajaraja Chola, the great Chola who conquered a large area in South India at the beginning of the 11th century C.E. It occupies an important place in the history of India. As the capital of the Cholas from about 1025 C.E. for about 250 years, the city controlled the affairs of entire south India, from the Tungabhadra in the north to Ceylon in the south. The great temple of Siva at this place is next only to the Brihadisvara temple at Thanjavur in its monumental nature and surpasses it in sculptural quality.

Gangaikonda Cholapuram is located 18 km from veeramudaiyanatham.

- Bhuvanagiri "Raghavendra Swami"

Sri Guru Raghavendra Swamy (1595–1671) is an influential 16th-century Hindu saint who advocated Vaishnavism (worship of Vishnu as the supreme God) and Sri Madhvacharya's Dvaita philosophy. He ascended Brindavana at Mantralayam in present-day Andhra Pradesh in 1671. Sri Raghavendra Swami was born as Sri Venkanna Bhatta, the second son of Sri Thimanna Bhatta and Smt. Gopikamba on Thursday, Sukla Saptami of Phalguna month in 1595, when the moon was in Mrigashirisha Nakshatra, at Bhuvanagiri, near present-day Chidambaram in Tamil Nadu. This place was located 14 from veeramudaiyanatham.

- Nataraja Temple, Chidambaram

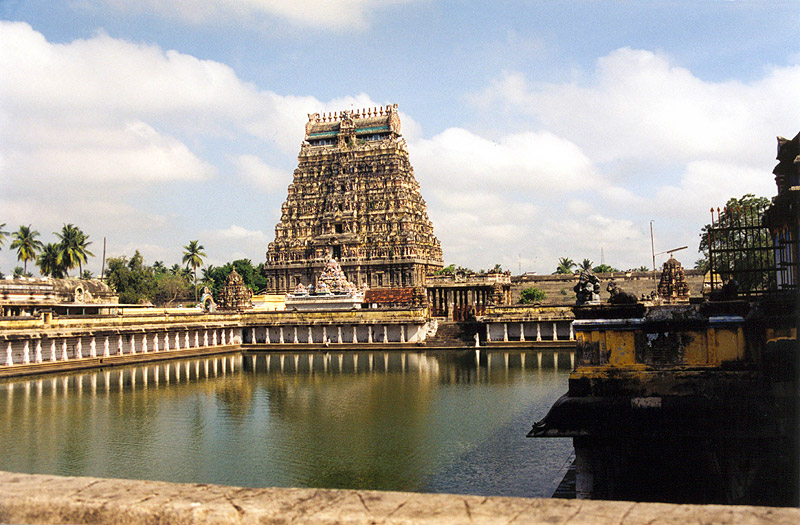
A view of the Nataraja Templer Tower

The ancient Chidambaram Temple (Tamil: சிதம்பரம் கோயில் ) is dedicated to Lord Shiva in His form of the Cosmic Dancer (Nataraja நடராசர்). It is one of the five Dancing Halls (Sabha) of Nataraja and the most famous one. Chidambaram hosts the most ancient set of 108 Karana stone carvings, the key dance movements of Nataraja. The temple complex is spread over 40 acres (160,000 m2) in the heart of the city. Many thousands of devotees come to this auspicious temple to pay homage to the Dancing Siva.

Chidambaram is located 23 km from veeramudayanatham.

- Pichavaram "Mangrove Forest"

Pichavaram the second largest Mangrove forest in the world, near the temple town of Chidambaram, is one of the unique Eco-tourism spots in South India. The backwaters, inter connected by the Vellar and Coleroon river systems, offer abundant scope for water sports, rowing, Kayak and canoeing. Pichavaram mangroves are considered among the healthiest mangrove occurrence in the world. Pichavaram consists of a number of islands interspersing a vast expanse of water covered with green trees. The area is about 2800 acres and is separated from the sea by a sand bar which is a patch of extraordinary loveliness. Pitchavaram is located from 29 from veeramudaiyanatham.

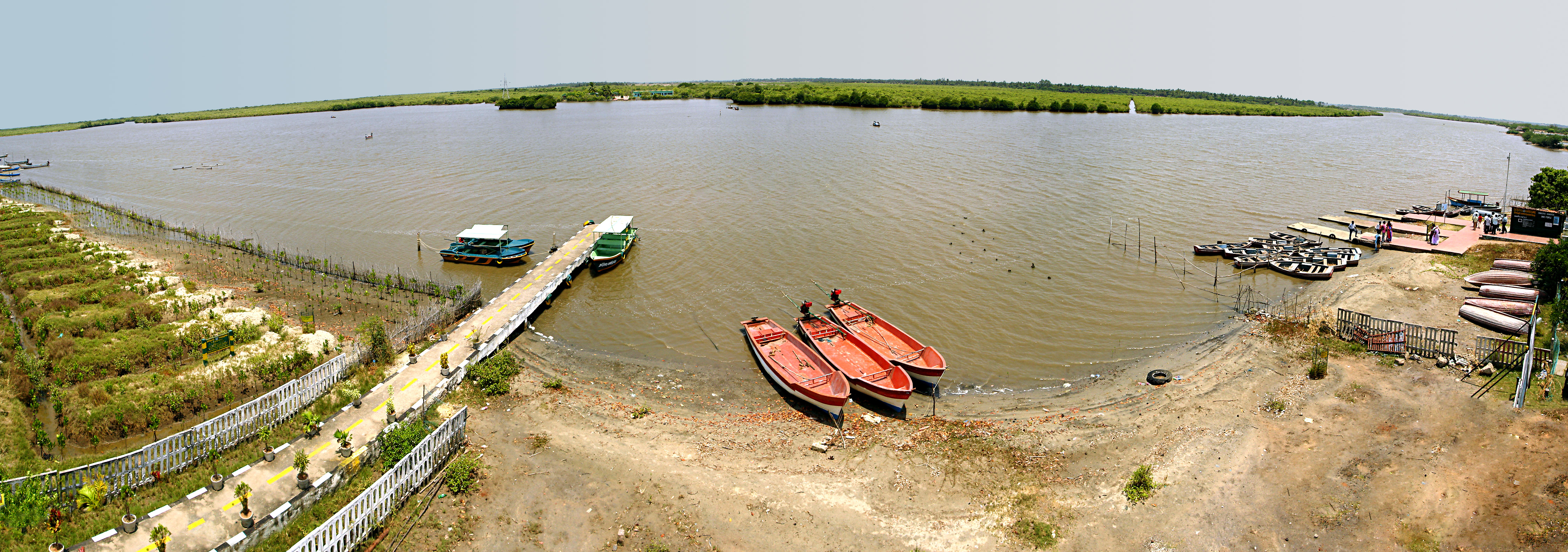
A view of the forest from the Pichavaram viewing tower
