= Chidambaranatha Soorappa Chozhanar =

Chidambaranatha Soorappa Chozhanar (died 2013) was the last anointed Zamindar of Pichavaram.

== Early life ==
He came from the family of Picharvaram Zamin living in Chidambaram. He earned an master's in political science.

== Heritage ==
The Chola safeguarded the key of the Nataraja temple, about one hundred years ago. During that time, the Dikshitars collected the key of the temple from the Zamin family every morning and received it from them at night. Chozhanar was anointed in 1978 at Nataraja temple in Chidambaram.

== Personal life ==
He married Santhi Devi, of Udayarpalayam Zamin with whom he had two sons, Chakravarthi, Mannarmannan and one daughter Ishwarya. He died at age 63 on 10 December 2013 and his wife was died on 10 sep 2025 .Both last rites were held at Chellappanpettai near Panthanallur in Thanjavur district. He was into agriculture.
