= Tirukkazhippalai Palvannanathar Temple =

Palvananathar Temple
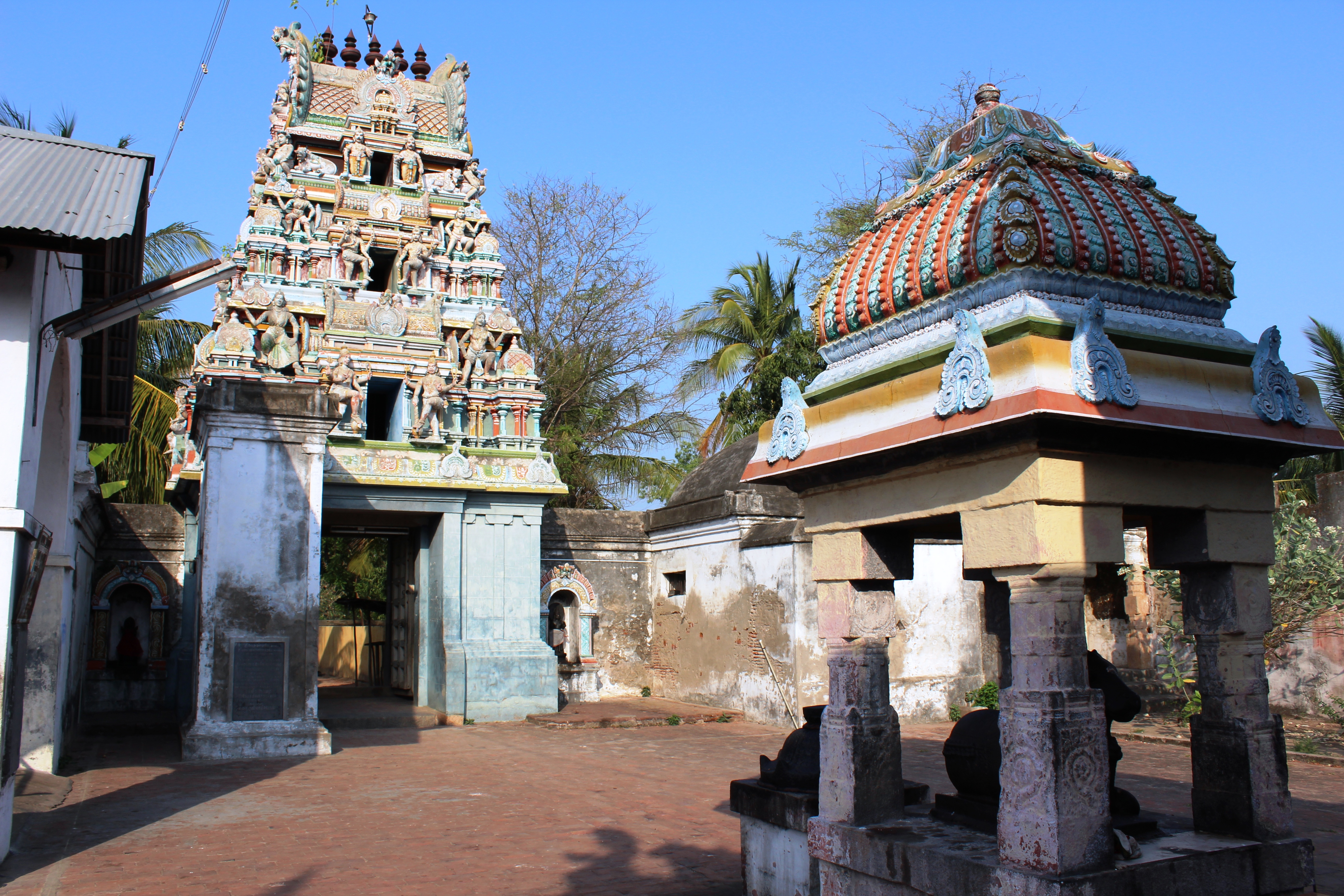

- Location in Tamil Nadu

Religion
- Affiliation: Hinduism
- Deity: Palvannanathar (Shiva) and Vedanayagi (Parvati)

Location
- Location: Sivapuri
- State: Tamil Nadu
- Country: India
- Coordinates: 11°22′15.5″N 79°42′50.8″E

Architecture
- Type: South Indian Architecture

Tirukkazhippalai Palvannanathar Temple is a Hindu temple at Sivapuri in Cuddalore district of Tamil Nadu], India. The presiding deity is Shiva in the form of Palvannanathar and his consort is known as Vedanayaki. The presiding deity is revered in the 7th century Tamil Saiva canonical work, the Tevaram.

The temple complex covers an area of one acre and all its shrines are enclosed with concentric rectangular walls.

== Legend ==
As per Hindu legend, the god Shiva and his wife Parvati appeared before the sage Agastya at this place. It is counted as one of the eight places where the sage got the darshan of Shiva. As per another legend, sage Kabila made a lingam (an iconic representation of Shiva). A king was moving along the way and his horse's hooves split the lingam into two. The sage was disappointed and he started making another lingam. Shiva and Parvati made a divine intervention and provided milk from the divine cow Kamadhenu that strengthened the image. The deity thus came to be known as Palvannanathar. In modern times, it is believed that the ablution done with milk is absorbed by the image. The temple is believed to have been in a place called Karaimedu village which was washed away in a flood in river Coleroon and has been moved here.

== Architecture ==
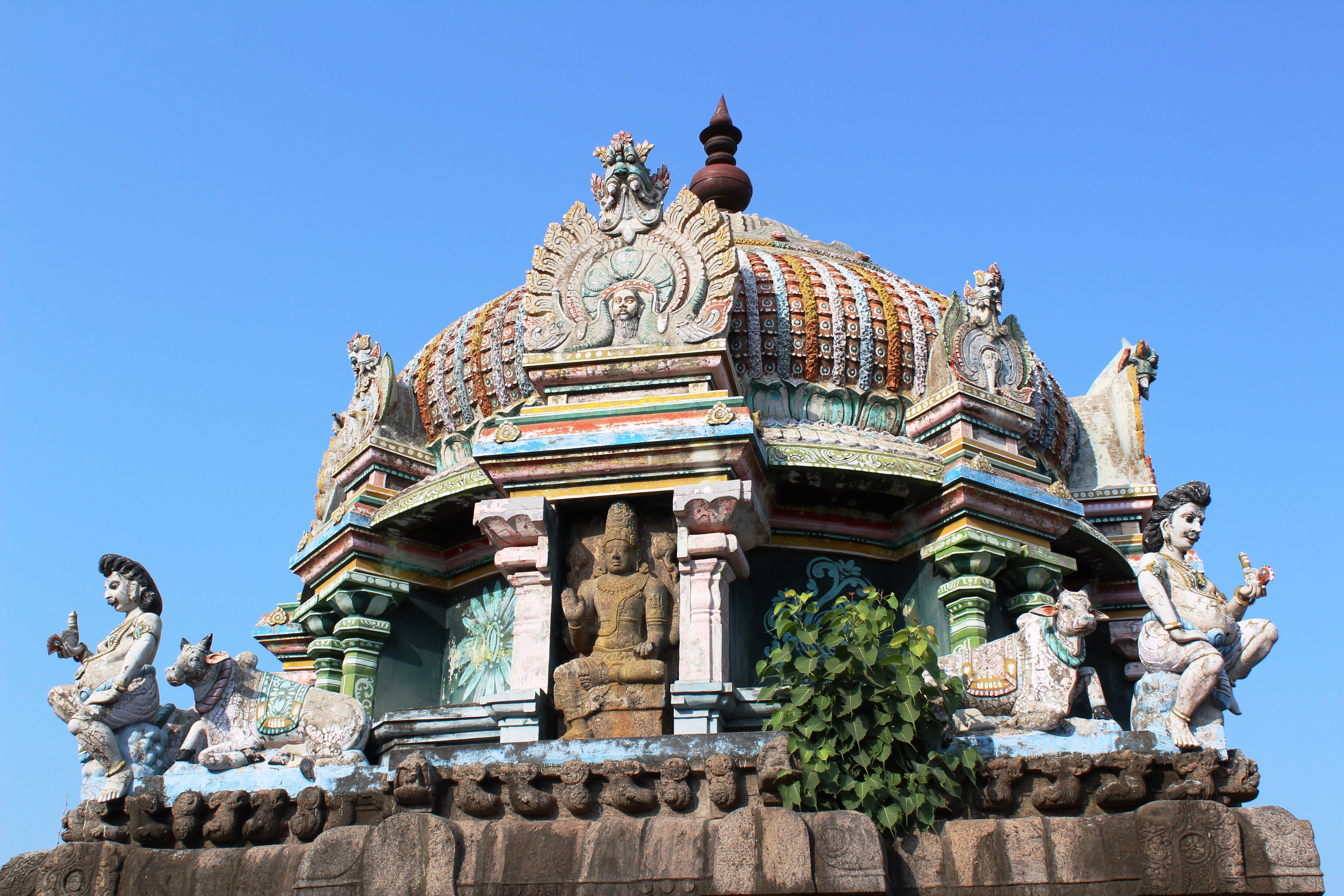
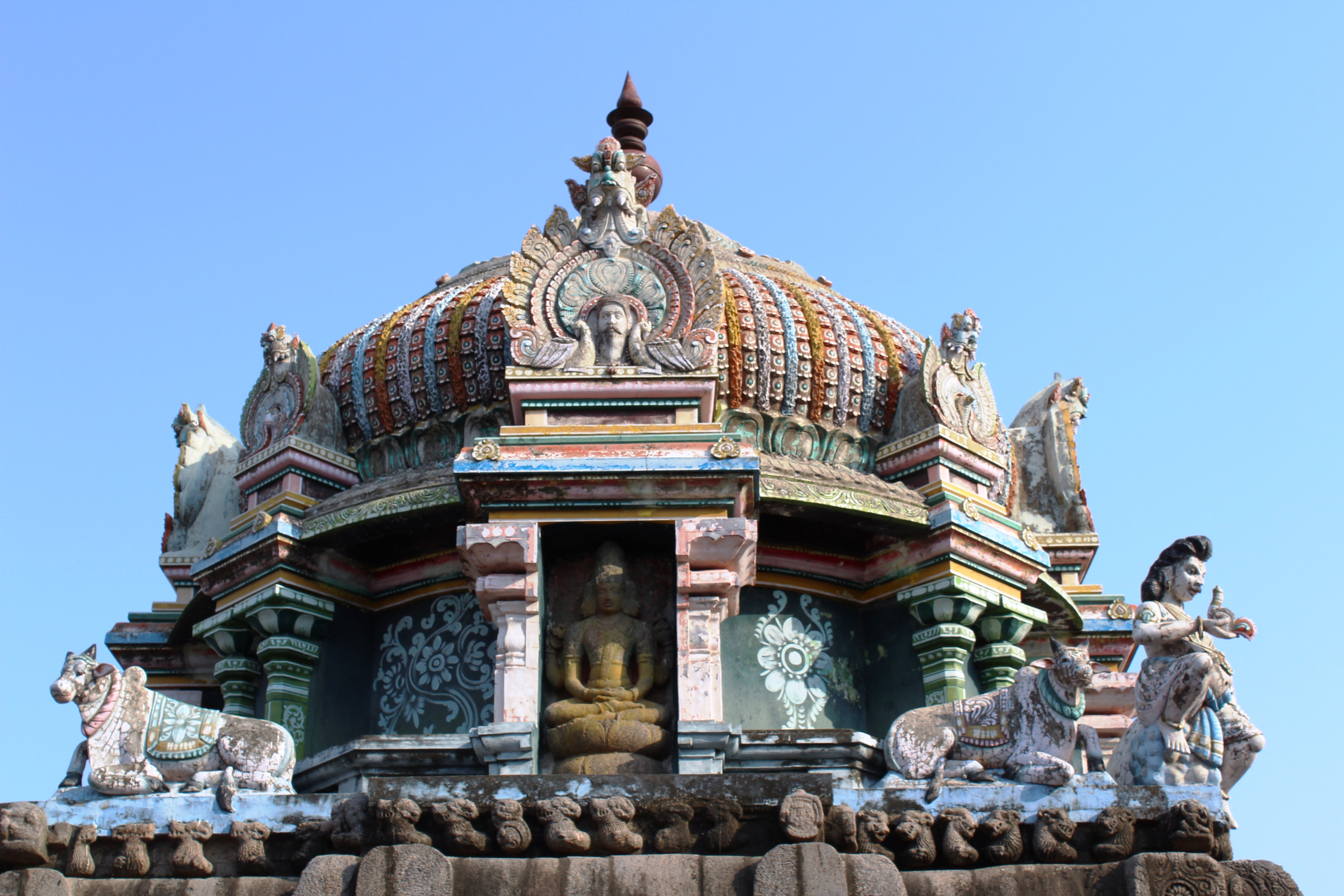
Image of Shiva in various postures in the vimana

Palvannanathar temple is located in Sivapuri, a place 5 km (3.1 mi) from Chidambaram. The temple has a three tiered rajagopuram on the eastern side with concentric rectangular walls surrounding the temple. The passageway from the main road to the gopuram has an image of Nandi, located axial to the sanctum. The sanctum is approached through a pillared hall called mukha mandapa and an artha mandapa. The shrine of the Ambal is located in the mukhamandapa facing south. The presiding deity in the form of lingam (an iconic form of Shiva) is located in the sanctum. It is believed that the image is self manifested. There is a panel on the wall behind the image that depicts the marriage of Shiva and Parvathi. There is a circumabulatory passage around the shrines. The pillars in the hall leading to the sanctum has sculpted images depicting various Hindu legends. There is an image of Bhairava located in the south eastern corner of the temple, which is believed to have been made by same sculptor as in Varanasi. The image does not have the vahana of Bhairava, as in other temples.

== Literary mention ==
Tirugnanasambandar and Appar mention the temple deity in their works.
