= Tiruvetkalam Pasupatheswarar Temple =

Hindu temple of Shiva in Chidambaram, India

Paasupatheeswar Temple
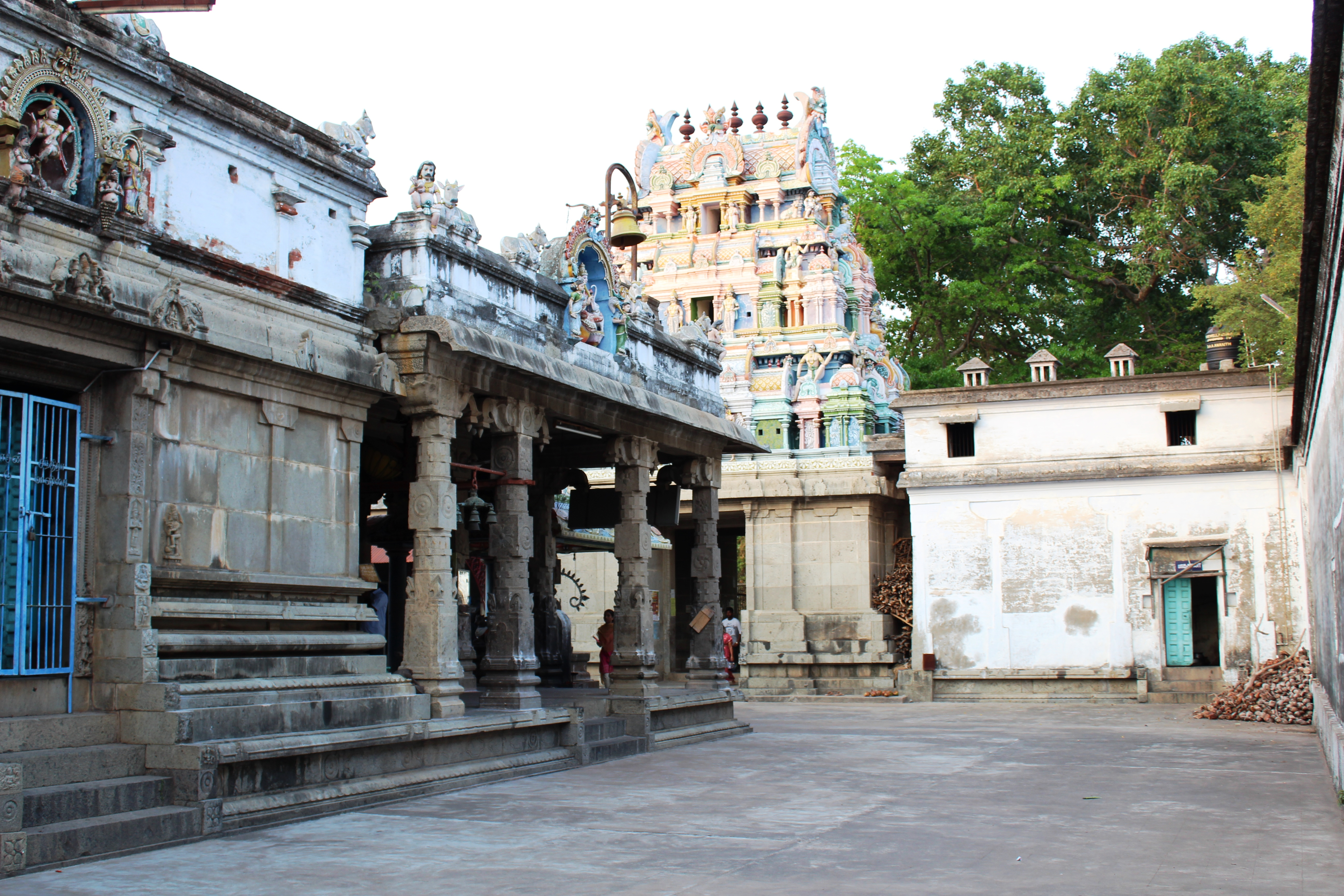

- Location in Tamil Nadu

Religion
- Affiliation: Hinduism
- Deity: Pasupatheeswarar (Shiva) and Satgunambal (Parvati)

Location
- Location: Chidambaram
- State: Tamil Nadu
- Country: India
- Coordinates: 11°23′29″N 79°43′10.7″E

Architecture
- Type: South Indian Architecture

Tiruvetkalam Pasupatheswarar Temple is a Hindu temple of the god Shiva located at Chidambaram in Cuddalore district of Tamil Nadu, India. Shiva is worshipped as Pasupatheswarar, along with His consort known as Satgunambal and Nalla Nayaki. The temple is located inside the Annamalai University complex.

The temple complex covers an area of two acres and all its shrines are enclosed with concentric rectangular walls. The temple has a number of shrines, with those of Paasupatheeswarar being the most prominent.

The temple has three daily rituals at various times from 6:00 a.m. to 8:30 p.m., and many yearly festivals on its calendar. Tamil New year during the Tamil month of Chittirai (April) is the most prominent festivals celebrated in the temple.

The original complex is believed to have been built by Cholas. In 1914, this was renovated with stone by A. Pethaperumal Chettiar from Kanadukathan

== Legend ==
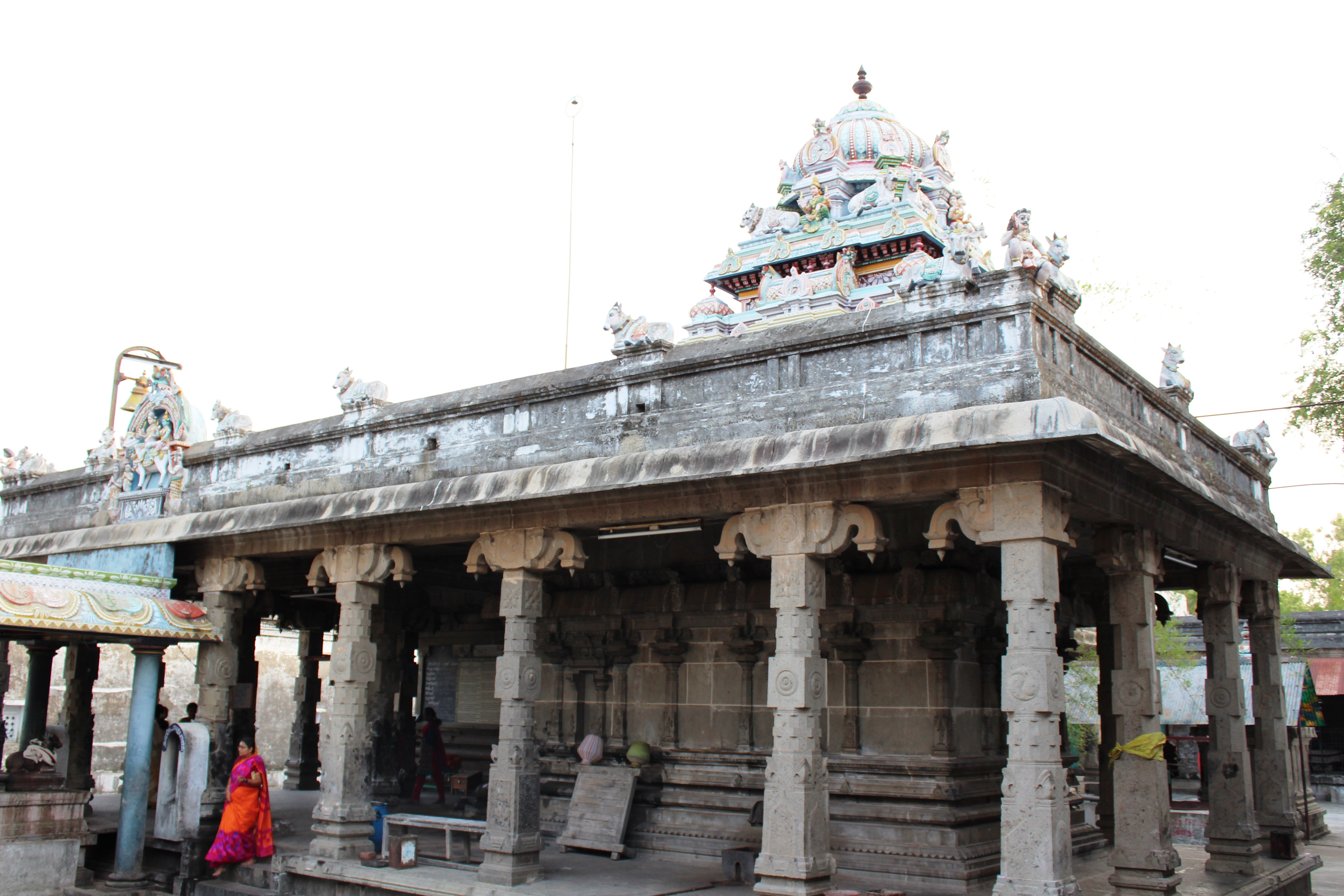
Shrine inside the temple

As per Hindu legend, Arjuna, the Pandava prince from the Hindu epic Mahabharata, performed severe penance at this place to please the god Shiva. One day, Arjuna spotted a wild boar speeding to attack him. While he shot the boar with an arrow, another hunter also claimed that he was the first to shoot the beast. A fight of superiority started between the two. Arjuna attacked the hunter with an arrow, the impact of which was felt by all beings in the world. The hunter then tossed Arjuna with his toe, who fell in Krupa Samudram. It took Arjuna time to realise that it was Shiva in the form of the hunter who attacked him. Parvati, the consort of Shiva was angry at Arjuna for hitting her husband, but Shiva pacified her. They both granted boons to Arjuna, a weapon named Pasupatham. Since Shiva granted Pasupatham at this place, he came to be known as Pasupatheeswarar. Periyapuranam, the 11th century compilation of the Nayanmars has details about Sambandar visiting the place after coming via Thillai Nataraja Temple.

== Architecture ==
Paasupatheeswarar temple is located in Annamalai Nagar, a place 2 km (1.2 mi) from Chidambaram and inside the premises of Annamalai University. The temple has a three tiered rajagopuram on the eastern side with concentric rectangular walls surrounding the temple. The sanctum is approached through a pillared hall called mukha mandapa and an artha mandapa. The shrine of the goddess is located in the mukhamandapa facing south. The presiding deity in the form of lingam (an iconic form of Shiva) is located in the sanctum. There is a circumabulatory passage around the shrines. The pillars in the hall leading to the sanctum has sculpted images depicting various Hindu legends. The pillared halls in the hall has legends of Arjuna doing penance. The image of Parvati with her hair unlocked is a notable feature. The metal image of Arjuna getting Pasupathasra from Shiva is housed in the temple.

== Religious importance and festivals ==
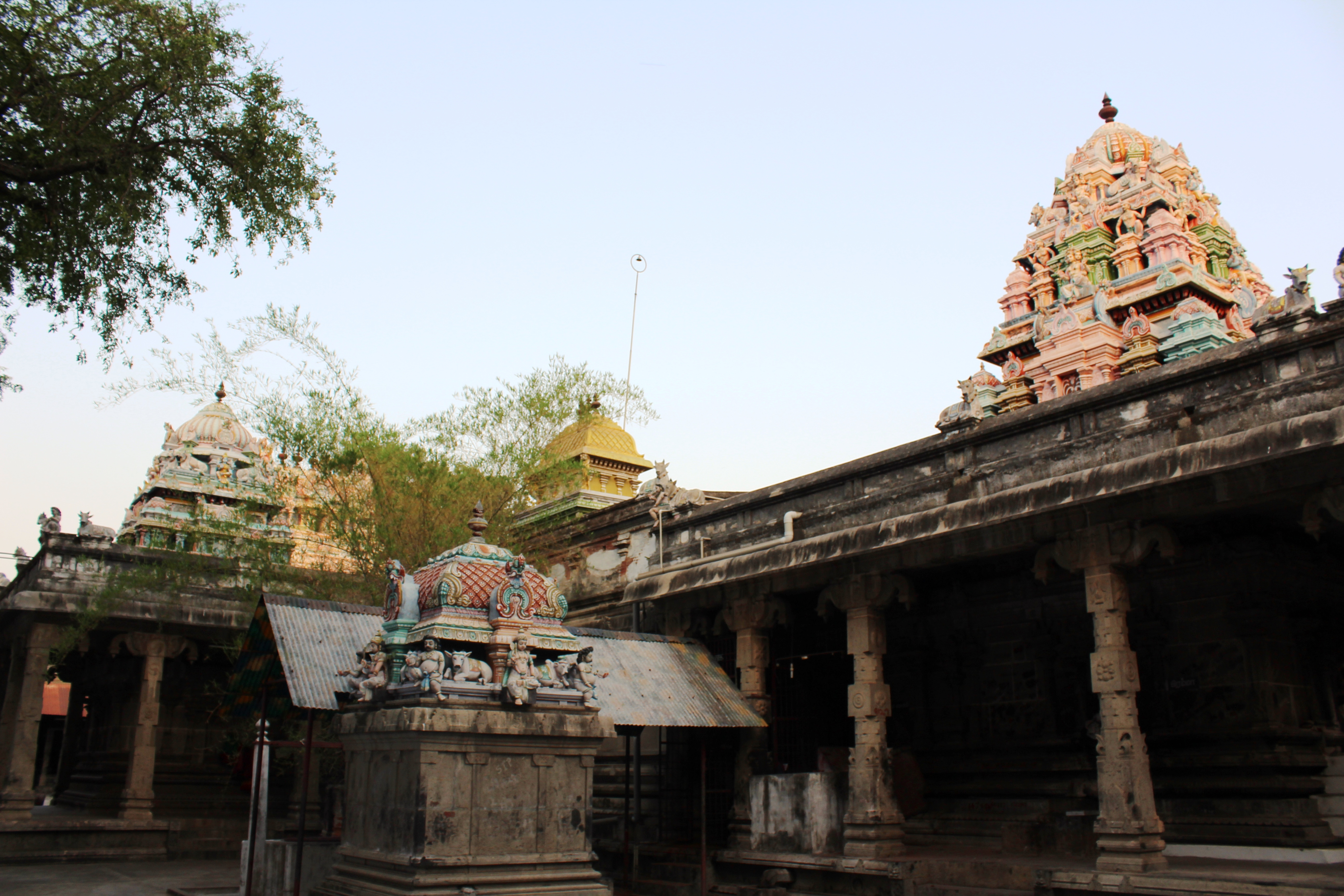
Shrine inside the temple

Sambandar, an 8th-century Tamil Shaiva saint poet, venerated Uchinathar in ten verses in Tevaram, compiled as the First Tirumurai. As the temple is revered in Tevaram, it is classified as Paadal Petra Sthalam, one of the 276 temples that find mention in the Shaiva canon. The temple is counted as the fourth in the series of the temples on the northern bank of river Kaveri.
