= Thillai Kali Temple, Chidambaram =

Hindu Temple

Coordinates: 11.39792°N 79.69551°E

Thillai Kali Temple is a Hindu Temple located on the outskirts of the town of Chidambaram, Cuddalore District Tamil Nadu in India. It was built by Chola King Kopperunchingan who ruled between 1229 and 1278.

== Temple ==
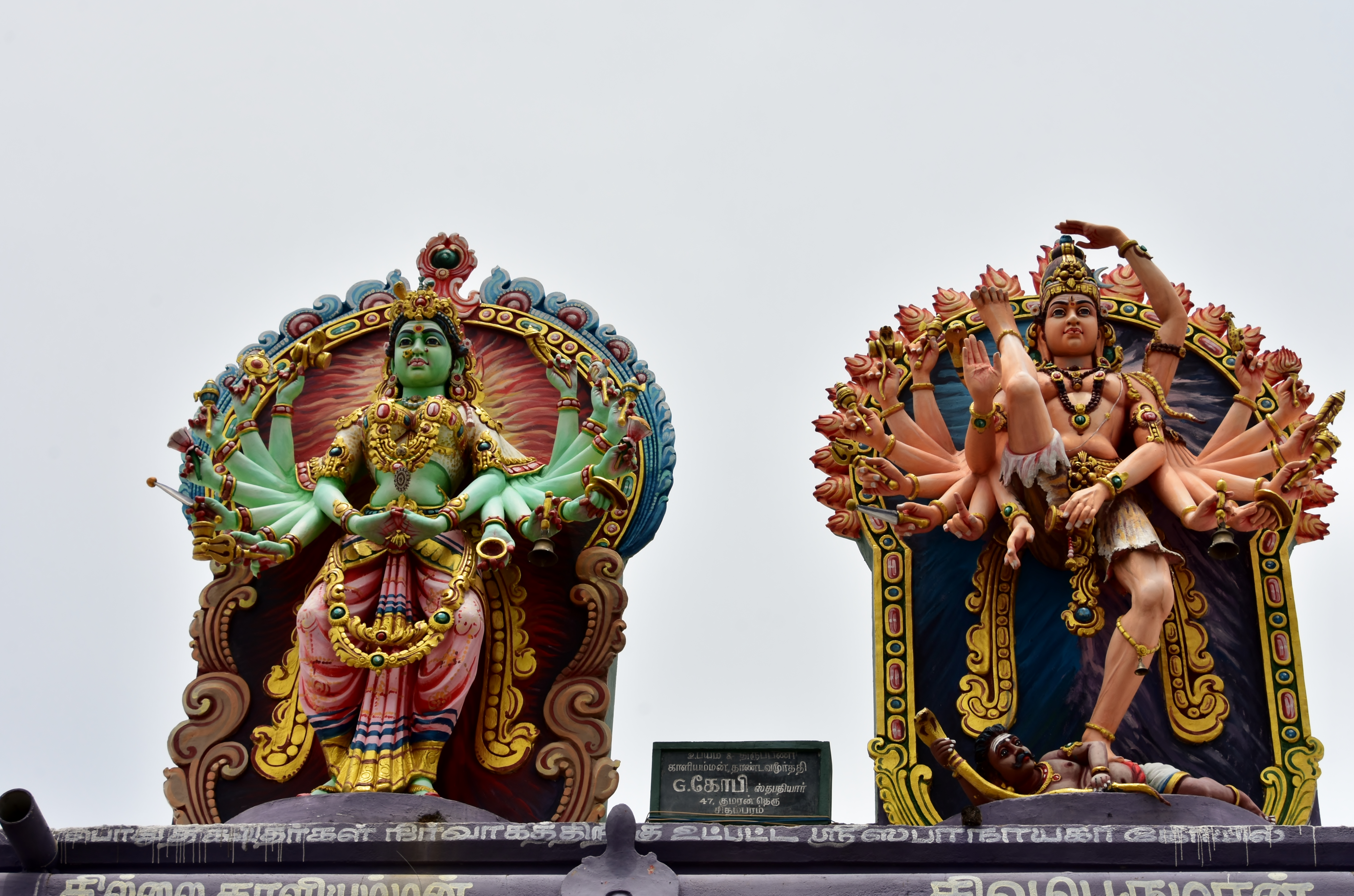
Kali dancing with Shiva (Nataraja) in Urdhva Tandava posture, sculpture in Chidambaram Nataraja temple

The temple is on the outskirts of the city of Chidambaram. Legend says that the goddess Kali (a form of Parvati) moved here after losing to the god Shiva in the celestial dance contest.

It was an argument that who is superior, either Shiva or his wife Parvati. In order to resolve thus, they performed a dance program at Chidambaram in front of Vishnu, Brahma and other deities. While they were playing dance, Shiva was about to be defeated.

Shiva performed the Urdhva Tandava posture, i.e. raising one leg above his head and challenged Parvati to replicate it. Due to her modesty and shyness, Parvati refused and agreed her defeat.

Parvati in anger assumed her ferocious form Kali and left Chidambaram (Thillai) and settled outside the town borders. Thus, she is worshipped as Thillai Kali here. Her anger was pacified by Brahma by chanting the Veda and praising her.

Kali was pleased and assumed a benign form with four heads similar to Brahma and known as Thillai Amman (Mother of Thillai) or Brahma Chamundeeswari.

There are two main shrines in the temple. The west-facing shrine depicts the goddess in his benign four-faced form Brahma Chamundeeswari.

In the east-facing shrine, the goddess appears in her ferocious form called Thillai Kali.

The other important shrines are for goddess Saraswati as Veena Vidyambigai and for Dakshinamurthy (a form of Shiva) where he has a female form called Kadambavana Dhakshina Rupini.

== History ==
Kali or Durga worship, also known as Shaktism, entered into Tamil country from Gauda region (present day Bengal) before 7th century C.E. Tantric rituals were followed during the daily worship in the Kali temples. The situation changed when Cholas were in ascendancy. Cholas embraced Saivism as their religion and the rituals were based on Agamas rather than Tantric tradition. During the reign of Vikrama Chola (1118 C.E. to 1135 C.E.) and his son Kulothunga-II and grandson Rajaraja-II the transition to Saivism was complete and Shaktism was relegated to subordinate role. Shiva the supreme god was also portrayed as the King of Dance (Nataraja) and in the mythology he defeated Kali in the dance competition. The symbolism of the victory of Saivism over Shaktism is unmistakable.

When the later Cholas constructed the grand Shiva temple in Chidambaram it became the center of the town and the Thillai Kali temple location became the outskirts of the town.

From the various inscriptions on temple walls, it appears that the present temple was constructed in the 13th century C.E. by one Kadava Kopperunchingan, a local chieftain. The deity is variously referred to as Pidariyar, Thillai Vanam Udaya Parameshwari and Thillai Thiruchitrambala Mahakali in the inscriptions.

== Festival ==
"Vaikasi Thiruvizha" is the most famous festival in this temple. This festival takes place for 13 days during the Tamil month of Vaikasi (mid May to mid June). Ablution is done to the deity with Gingelly oil, Sandal powder and Vermilion every day morning. Sacred wrist band (Vaikasi Kaapu) is tied to the deity. The deity is taken in a procession every day evening, each day in a different vehicle (Vahana) like Boodhahi Vaahanam, sooryaprabhai and Chandraprabhai. On the 9th day the procession happens on a Chariot (Ther).

Finally on the next 4 days the "Theerthavaari Utsavam", "Kaapu kalaidal", "Manjal Neerattu", "Muthupallakku Utsavam" and "Theppa Utsavam" take place. The "Vaikasi Peruvizha" ends with the "Thiru Oonjal Vizha".

== Location ==
Chidambaram is 245 km away from Chennai International airport and has a railway station that is connected with Trichy, Madurai and Chennai.
