= Pichavaram =

Village in Cuddalore District, Tamil Nadu, India

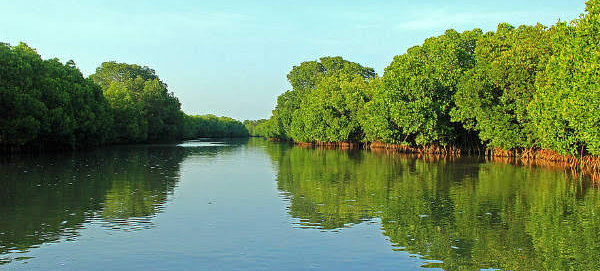
- Pichavaram Mangrove Forest

- Location within Tamil Nadu
- Coordinates: 11.41°N 79.78°E
- Country: India
- State: Tamil Nadu
- District: Cuddalore
- Taluk: Bhuvanagiri
- Town Panchayath: Parangipettai

Area
  - Total: 14.79 km^{2} (5.71 sq mi)
- Elevation: 6 m (20 ft)

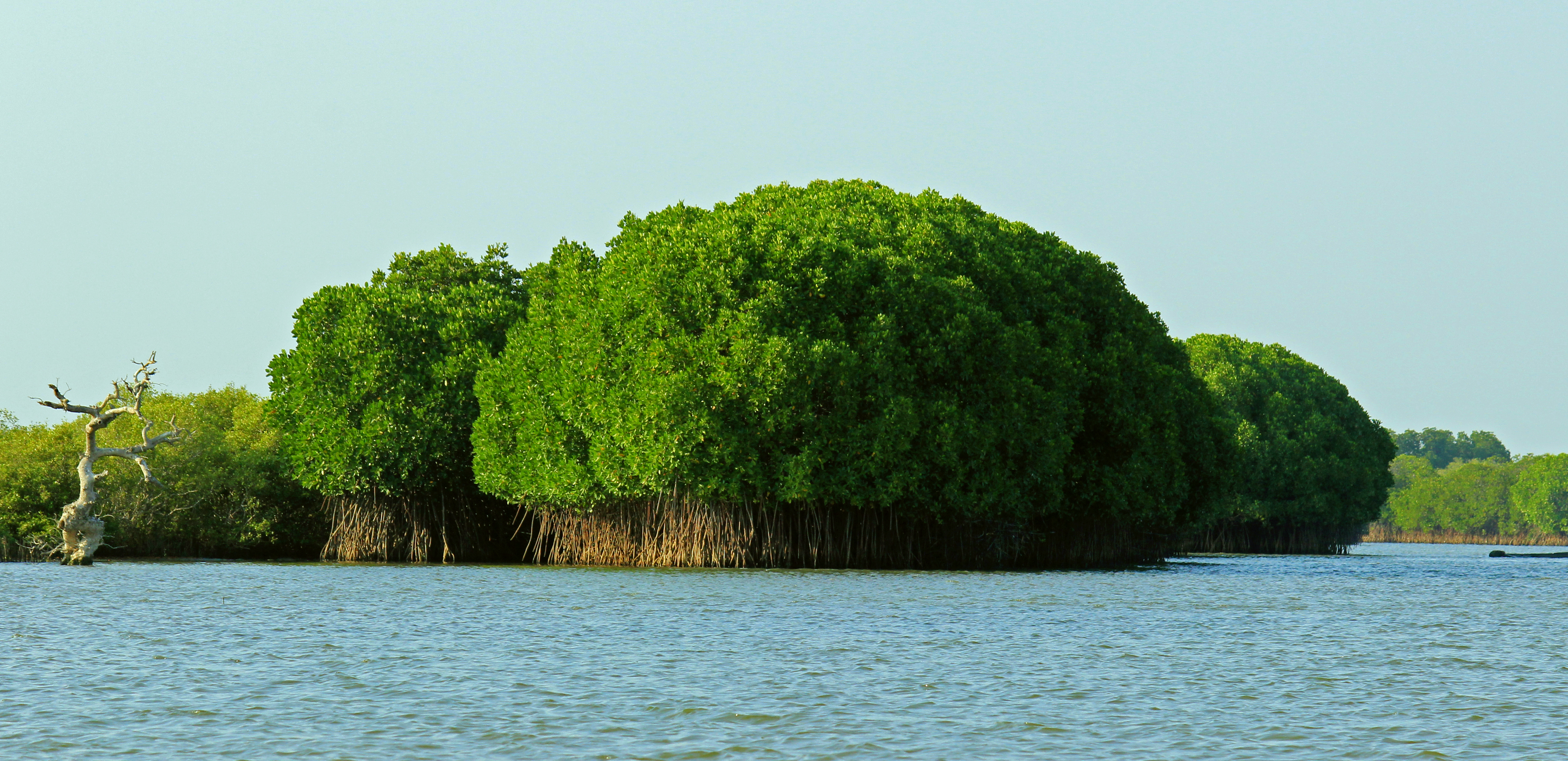
Pichavaram hosts one of the largest mangrove forests in India.

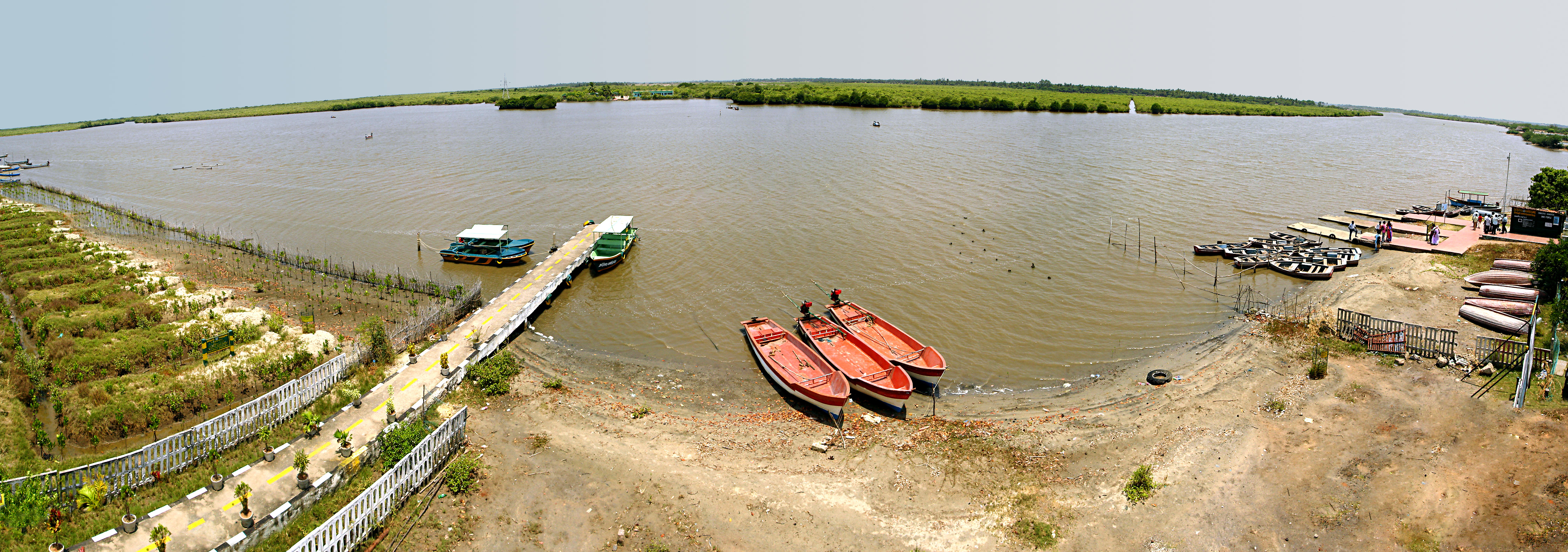
A view of the forest

Pichavaram is one of the villages of Parangipettai near Chidambaram in Cuddalore District, Tamil Nadu, India. It is located between the Vellar estuary in the north and Coleroon estuary in the south. The Vellar-Coleroon estuarine complex forms the Killai backwater and the mangroves that are permanently rooted in a few feet of water. It is located at a distance of 243 km from Chennai, 42 km from Cuddalore and 15 km from Chidambaram.

== Mangrove forests ==
Pichavaram consists of a number of islands interspersing a vast expanse of water covered with mangrove forest. The Pichavaram mangrove forest is one of the largest mangrove forests in India covering about 45 km^{2} of area (as of 2019). It is separated from the Bay of Bengal by a sand bar. The biotope consists of species like Avicennia and Rhizophora. It also supports the existence of rare varieties of economically important shells and fishes.

Under an initiative of the Government of Tamil Nadu aimed at reducing the impact of cyclones, tidal surges, and coastal erosion, as well as supporting biodiversity and local livelihoods, mangroves have been planted in the Cuddalore district along with nine other districts. According to official statistics, more than 2,900 ha (29 km^{2}) of mangrove forests have been planted or restored from 2021 to 2025 under this programme.

== Fauna ==
The mangroves also attract migrant and local birds including snipes, cormorants, egrets, storks, herons, spoonbills and pelicans. About 177 species of birds belonging to 15 orders and 41 families have been recorded. The high population of birds could be seen from November to January due to the high availability of prey, the coincidence of the time of arrival of true migrants from foreign countries and local migrants from their breeding grounds across India. The availability of different habitat types such as channels, creeks, gullies, mudflats and sand flats and adjacent seashore offers ideal habitats for different species of birds and animals.

== Gallery ==
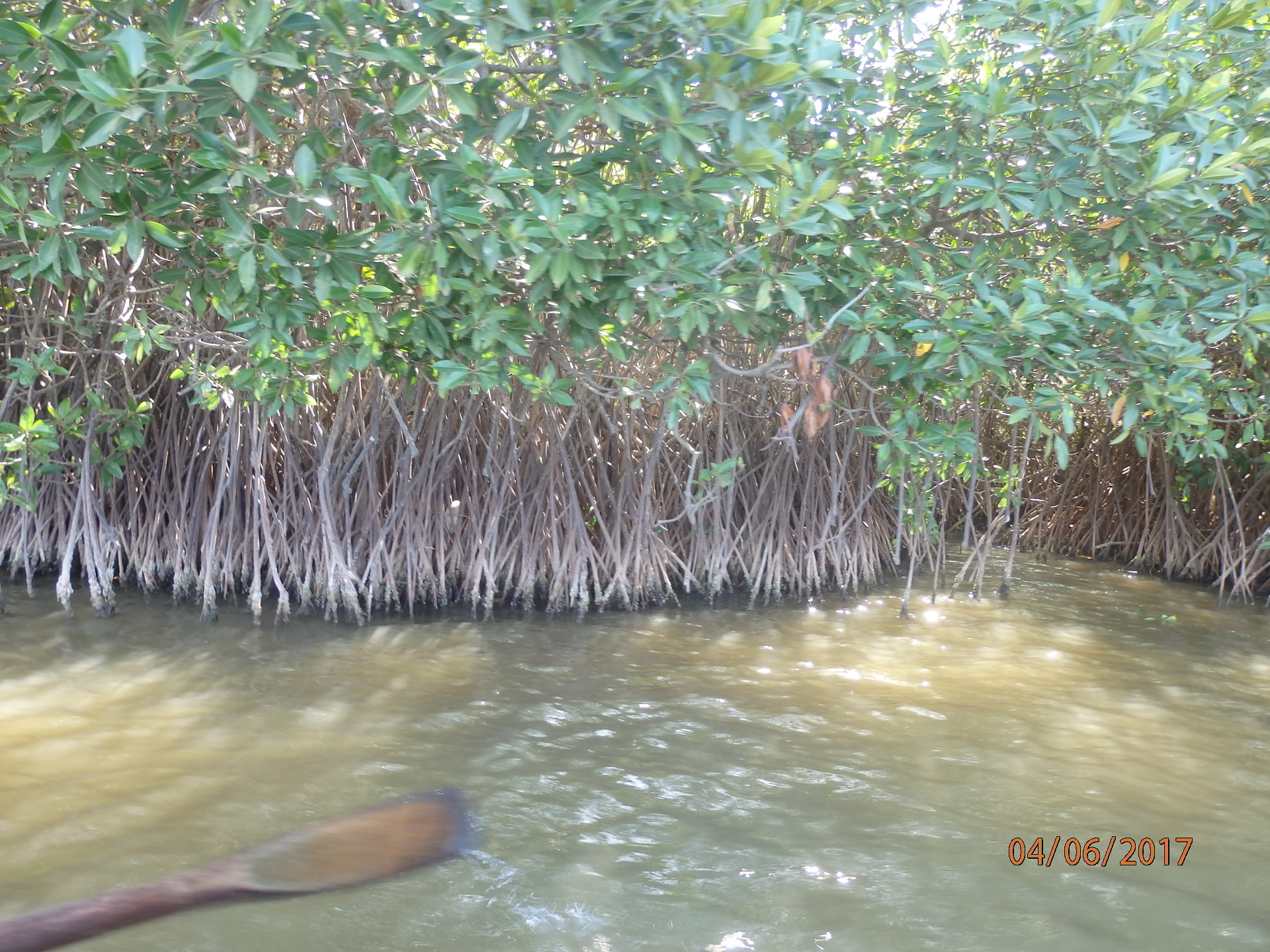
Mangroves of Pichavaram

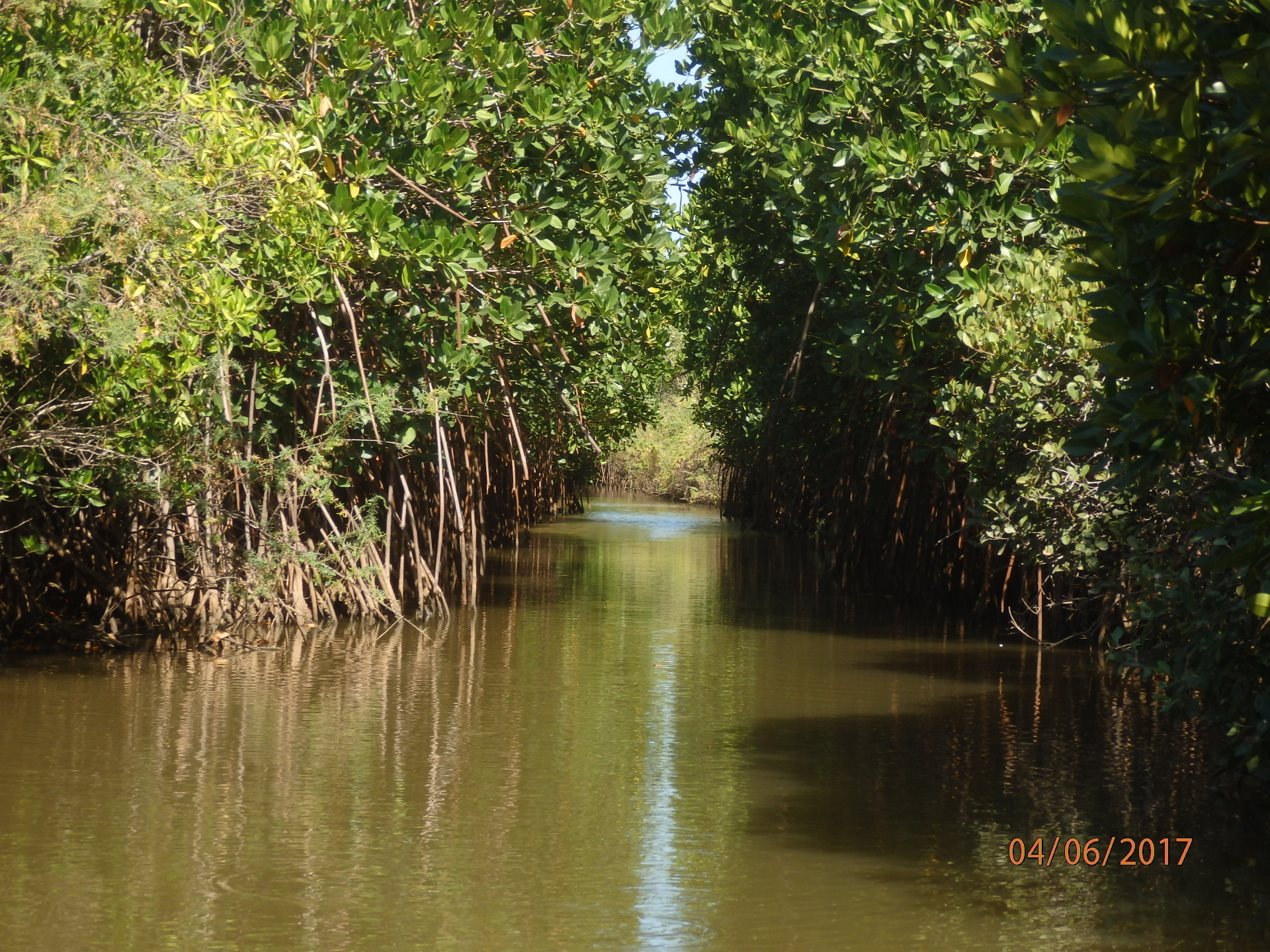
Mangroves canopy

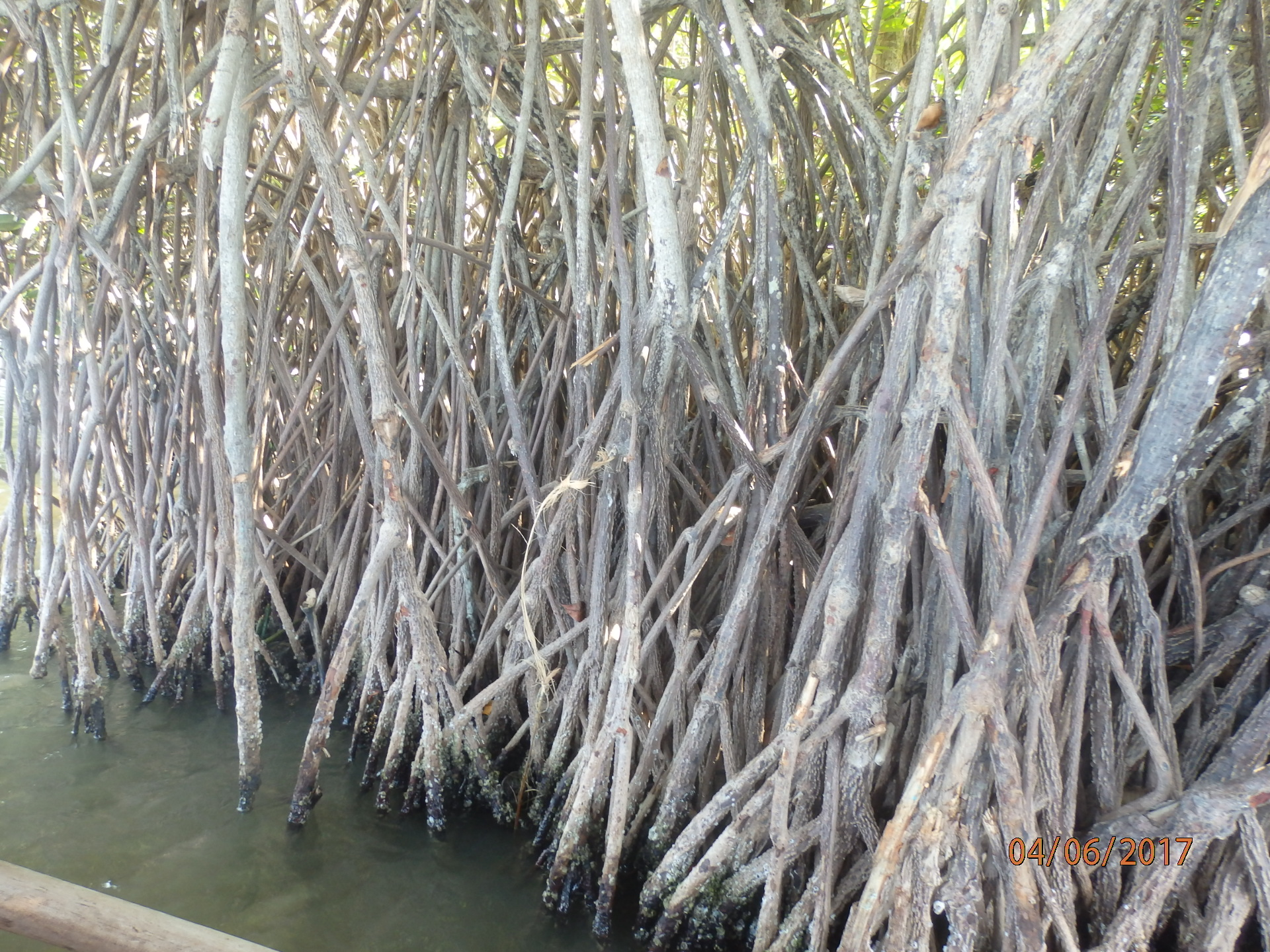
Aerial roots of Mangroves
