= Nataraja =

Depiction of Shiva as Lord of the dance

- Lord of the dance
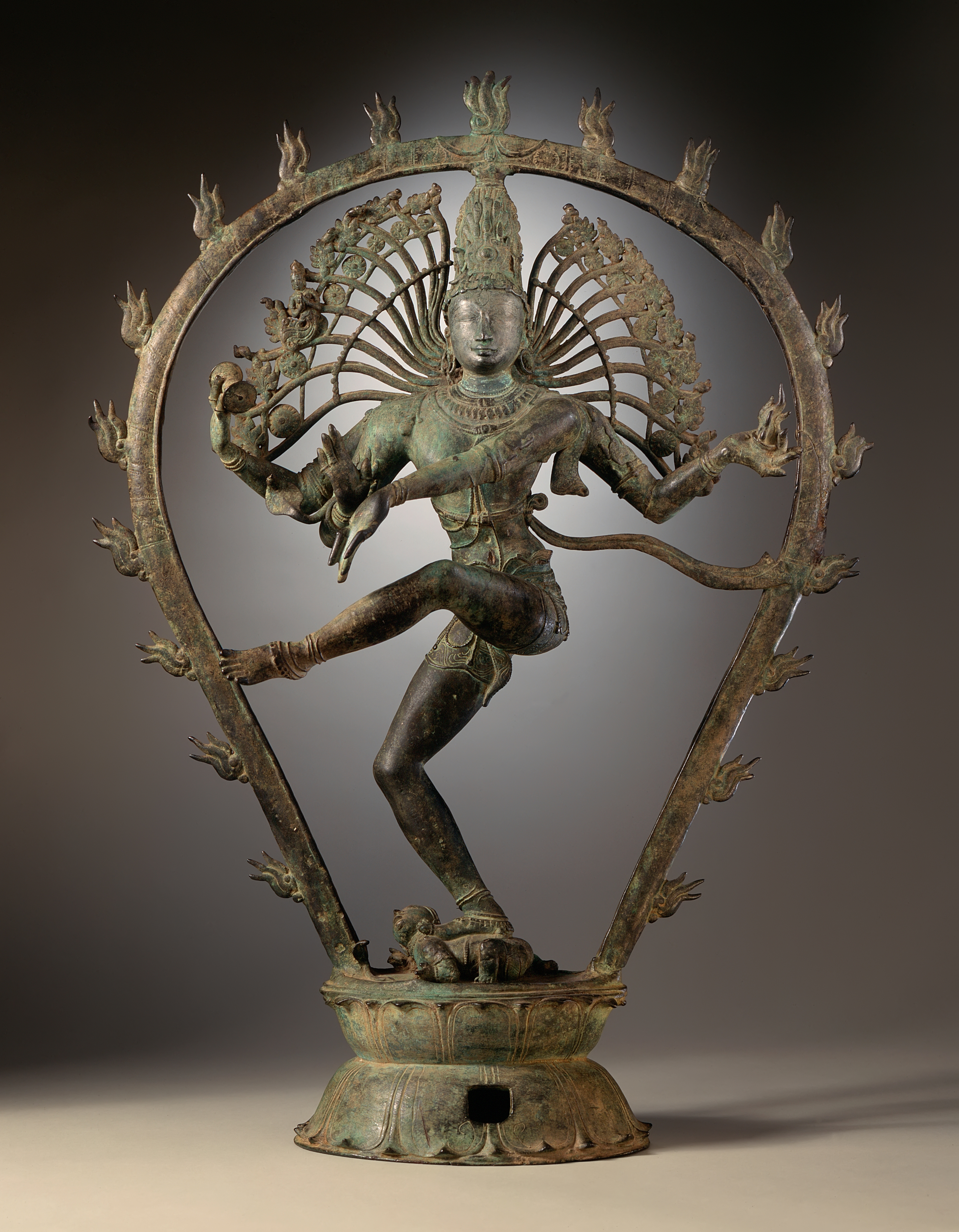
- Shiva as Nataraja, the Lord of Dance (c. 950–1000 CE)
- Other names: Adalvallan, Koothan, Sabesan, Ambalavanan
- Affiliation: Shiva
- Symbols: Ether (sky)
- Texts: Amshumadagama; Uttarakamika agama

Nataraja (Sanskrit: नटराज, IAST: Naṭarāja; Tamil: நடராஜர், Naṭarājar), also known as Adalvallan (ஆடல்வல்லான், Ādalvallāṉ), is a depiction of Shiva, one of the main deities in Hinduism, as the divine cosmic dancer. His dance is called the tandava.

The pose and artwork are described in many Hindu texts such as the Tevaram and Thiruvasagam in Tamil and the Amshumadagama and Uttarakamika agama in Sanskrit and the Grantha texts. The depiction (murti) of his dance is featured in all major Hindu temples of Shaivism, and is a well-known sculptural symbol in India and popularly used as a symbol of Indian culture, as one of the finest illustrations of Hindu art. (Note: This form is also referred to as Kuththan (கூத்தன், Kūththaṉ), Sabesan (சபேசன், Sabēsaṉ), and Ambalavanan (அம்பலவாணன், Ambalavāṇaṉ) in various Tamil texts.)

Stone reliefs at the Ellora Caves and the Badami Caves, by around the 6th century, are among the oldest Nataraja sculptures in India. Chola bronze statues emerge in Tamil Nadu around the 8th to 10th century. Nataraja reliefs have been found in many parts of South East Asia such as Angkor Wat and in Bali, Cambodia, and Central Asia.

== Etymology ==
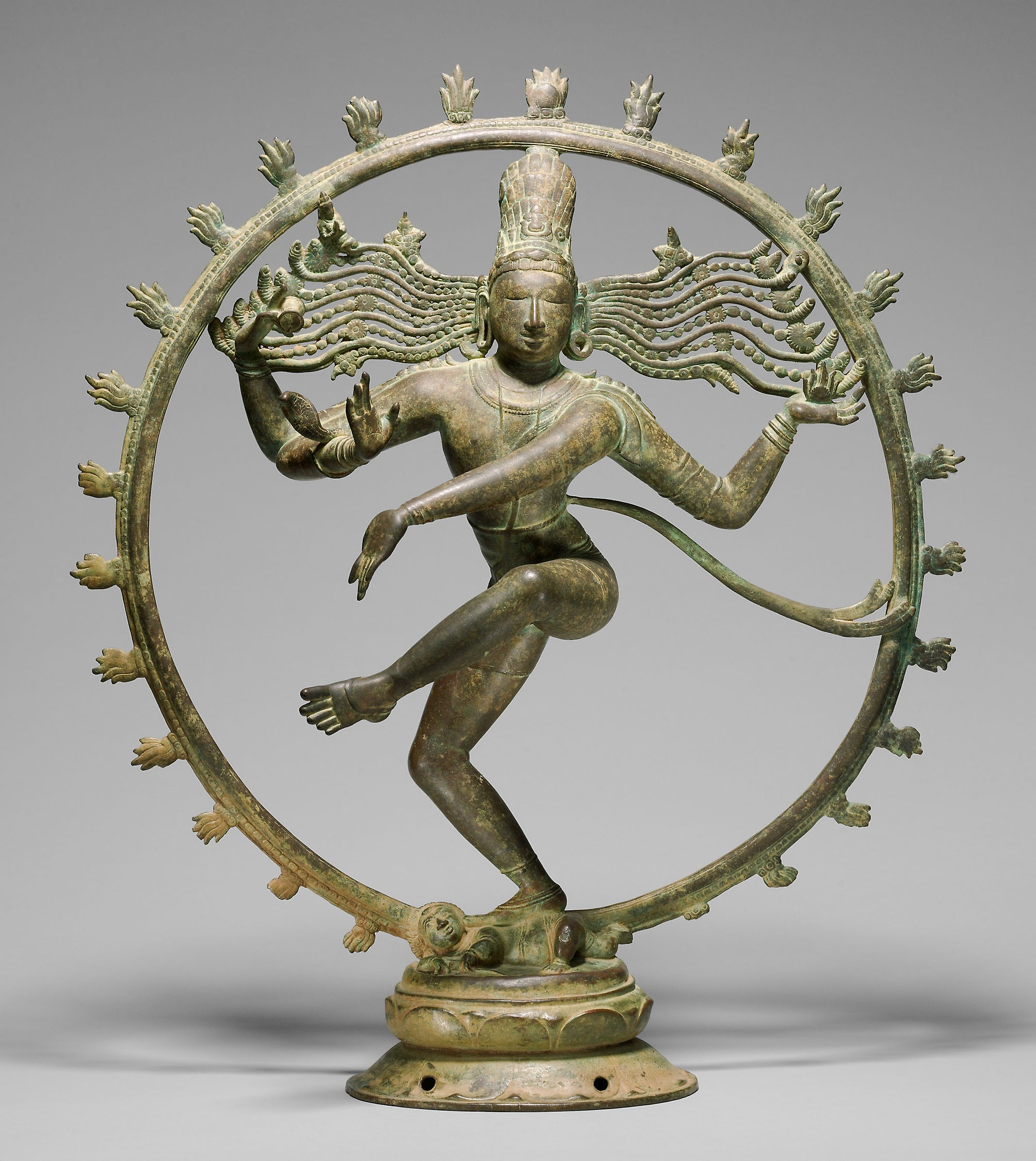
Chola bronze, Tamil Nadu, 10th or 11th century.

The word Nataraja is a Sanskrit term, from नट Nata meaning "act, drama, dance" and राज Raja meaning "king, lord"; it can be roughly translated as Lord of the dance or King of the dance. According to Ananda Coomaraswamy, the name is related to Shiva's fame as the "Lord of Dancers" or "King of Actors".

The form is known as Nataraja and as Narteśvara (also written Nateshwar) or Nṛityeśvara, with all three terms meaning "Lord of the dance". However, Nataraja and Nateshwar represent different forms of Shiva. Narteśvara stems from Nṛtta same as Nata which means "act, drama, dance" and Ishvara meaning "lord". Natesa (IAST: Naṭeśa) is another alternate equivalent term for Nataraja found in 1st-millennium sculptures and archeological sites across the Indian subcontinent.

In Tamil, he is also known as “Sabesan” (Tamil: சபேசன்) which splits as “Sabayil adum eesan” (Tamil: சபையில் ஆடும் ஈசன்) which means “The Lord who dances on the dais”. This form is present in most Shiva temples, and is the prime deity in the Nataraja Temple at Chidambaram (Tillai). The dance of Shiva in Chidambaram forms the motif for all the depictions of Shiva as Nataraja. Koothan(ta: கூத்தன், romanized: Kūththaṉ), Sabesan(ta: சபேசன், romanized: Sabēsaṉ), Ambalavanan (ta: அம்பலவாணன், romanized: Ambalavāṇaṉ) are other common names of Nataraja in Tamil texts.

== History ==
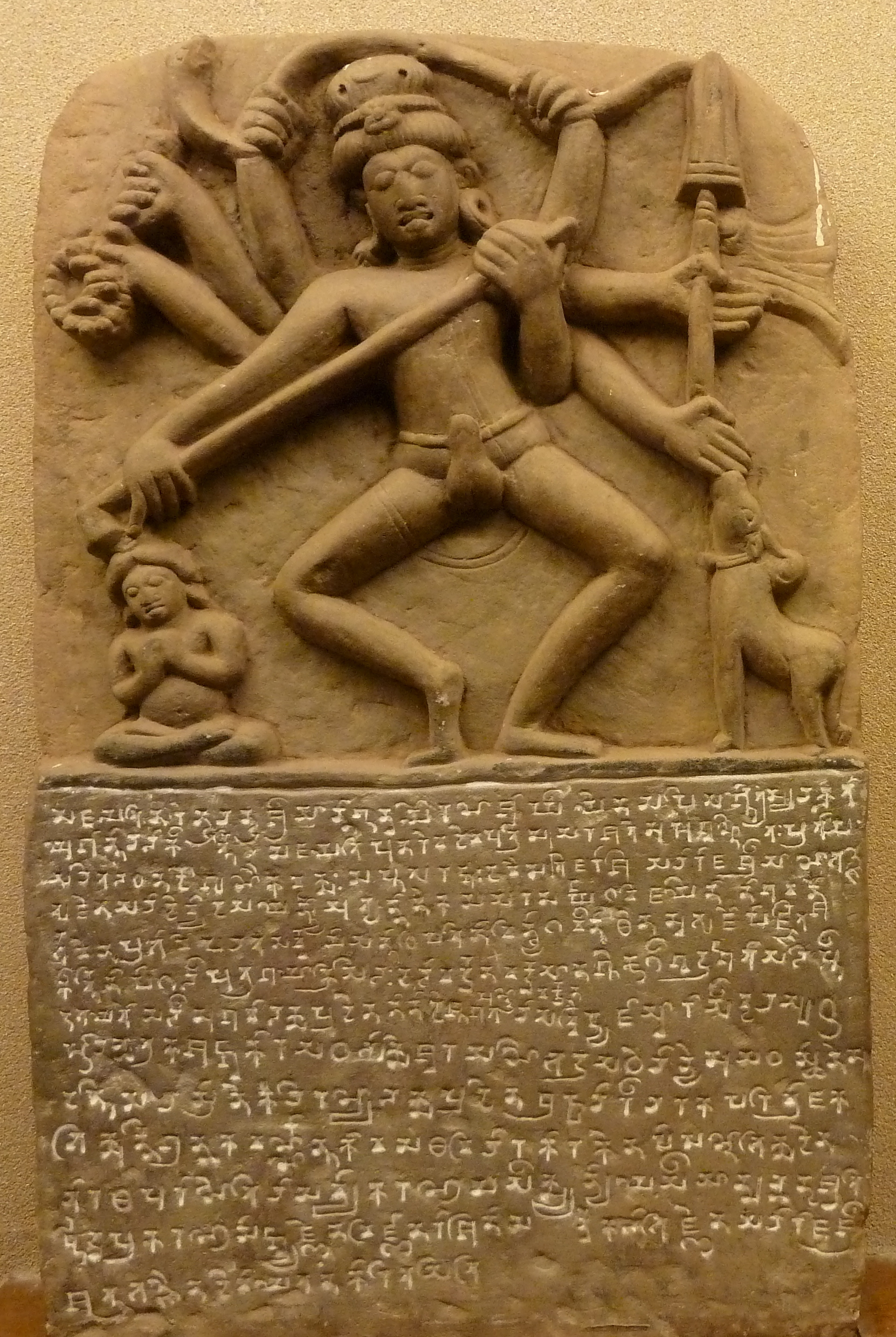
Asanpata Nataraja with Naga King Satrubhanja (261 CE) Inscription at Keonjhar district of Odisha 6th century CE

Stone reliefs depicting the classical form of Nataraja are found in numerous cave temples of India, such as at the Ellora Caves (Maharashtra), the Elephanta Caves, and the Badami Caves (Karnataka), by around the 6th century.

Literary evidences shows that the bronze representation of Shiva's ananda-tandava appeared first in the Pallava period between 7th century and mid-9th centuries CE. Nataraja was worshipped at Chidambaram during the Pallava period with underlying philosophical concepts of cosmic cycles of creation and destruction, which is also found in Tamil saint Manikkavacakar's Thiruvasagam.

Archaeological discoveries have yielded a red Nataraja sandstone statue, from 9th to 10th century from Ujjain, Madhya Pradesh, now held at the Gwalior Archaeological Museum. Similarly, Nataraja artwork has been found in archaeological sites in the Himalayan region such as Kashmir, albeit in with somewhat different dance pose and iconography, such as just two arms or with eight arms. Around the 10th century, it emerged in Tamil Nadu in its mature and best-known expression in Chola bronzes, of various heights typically less than four feet. Nataraja reliefs are found in historic settings in many parts of South East Asia such as Ankor Wat, and in Bali, Cambodia, and central Asia. The oldest free-standing stone sculptures of Nataraja were built by Chola queen Sembiyan Mahadevi. Nataraja gained special significance and became a symbol of royalty in Tamil Nadu. The dancing Shiva became a part of Chola era processions and religious festivals, a practice that continued thereafter.

The depiction was informed of cosmic or metaphysical connotations is also argued on the basis of the testimony of the hymns of Tamil saints.

In medieval era artworks and texts on dancing Shiva found in Nepal, Assam and Bengal, he is sometimes shown as dancing on his vahana (animal vehicle) Nandi, the bull; further, he is regionally known as Narteshvara. Nataraja artwork have also been discovered in Gujarat, Kerala and Andhra Pradesh. In the contemporary Hindu culture of Bali in Indonesia, Siwa (Shiva) Nataraja is the god who created dance. Shiva and his dance as Nataraja was also celebrated in the art of Java Indonesia when Hinduism thrived there, while in Cambodia he was referred to as Nrittesvara.

In 2004, a 2 meter statue of the dancing Shiva was unveiled at CERN, the European Center for Research in Particle Physics in Geneva. (Note: The statue, symbolizing Shiva's cosmic dance of creation and destruction, was given to CERN by the Indian government to celebrate the research center's long association with India. A special plaque next to the Shiva statue explains the metaphor of Shiva's cosmic dance with quotations from physicist Fritjof Capra: Hundreds of years ago, Indian artists created visual images of dancing Shivas in a beautiful series of bronzes. In our time, physicists have used the most advanced technology to portray the patterns of the cosmic dance. The metaphor of the cosmic dance thus unifies ancient mythology, religious art and modern physics.)

Though named "Nataraja bronzes" in Western literature, the Chola Nataraja artworks are mostly in copper, and a few are in brass, typically cast by the cire-perdue (lost-wax casting) process.

Nataraja is celebrated in 108 poses of Bharatanatyam, with Sanskrit inscriptions from Natya Shastra, at the Nataraja temple in Chidambaram, Tamil Nadu, India.

== Depiction ==
(Shiva) Nataraja (Lord of the Dance)

The sculpture is symbolic of Shiva as the lord of dance and dramatic arts, with its style and proportions made according to Hindu texts on arts. The two most common forms of Shiva's dance are the Lasya (the gentle form of dance), associated with the creation of the world, and the Ananda Tandava (dance of bliss, the vigorous form of dance), associated with the destruction of weary worldviews—weary perspectives and lifestyles. In essence, the Lasya and the Tandava are just two aspects of Shiva's nature; for he destroys in order to create, tearing down to build again.

According to Alice Boner, the historic Nataraja artworks found in different parts of India are set in geometric patterns and along symmetric lines, particularly the satkona mandala (hexagram) that in the Indian tradition means the interdependence and fusion of masculine and feminine principles.

It typically shows Shiva dancing in one of the Natya Shastra poses, holding Agni (fire) in his left back hand, the front hand in gajahasta (elephant hand) or dandahasta (stick hand) mudra, the front right hand with a wrapped snake that is in abhaya (fear not) mudra while pointing to a Sutra text, and the back hand holding a musical instrument, usually a Udukai (Tamil: உடுக்கை). His body, fingers, ankles, neck, face, head, ear lobes and dress are shown decorated with symbolic items, which vary with historic period and region. He is surrounded by a ring of flames, standing on a lotus pedestal, lifting his left leg (or in rare cases, the right leg) and balancing / trampling upon a demon shown as a dwarf (Apasmara or Muyalaka) who symbolizes spiritual ignorance. The dynamism of the energetic dance is depicted with the whirling hair which spread out in thin strands as a fan behind his head. The details in the Nataraja artwork have been variously interpreted by Indian scholars since the 12th century for its symbolic meaning and theological essence. Nataraja is a well known sculptural symbol in India and popularly used as a symbol of Indian culture, in particular as one of the finest illustrations of Hindu art.

== Symbolism ==
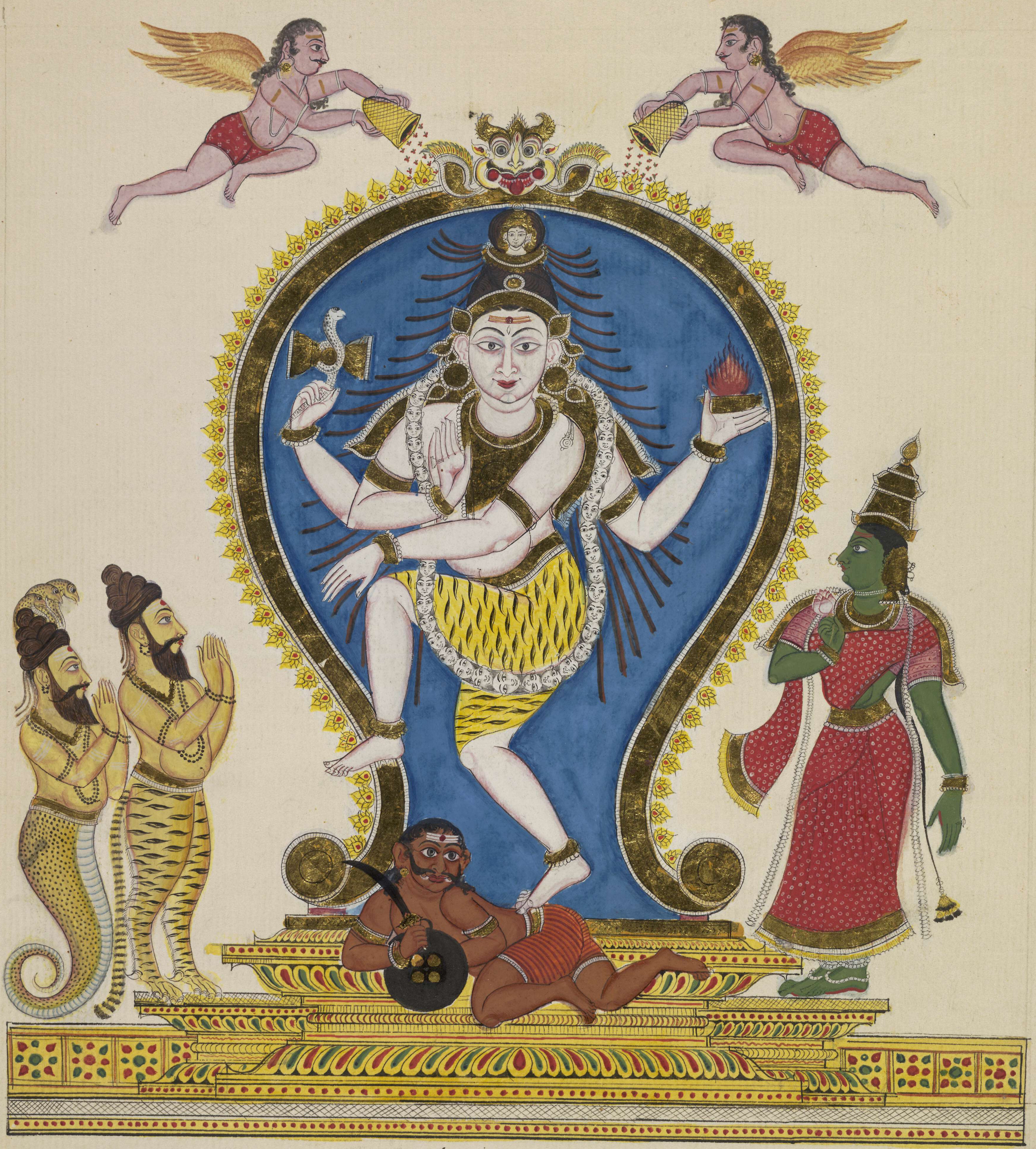
An 1820 painting of Nataraja in a temple chariot.

The dance of Nataraja is revealed in a story mentioned in the Koyil Puranam. The symbolism has been interpreted in classical Indian Shaiva Siddhanta texts such as Unmai Vilakkam, Mummani Kovai, Tirukuttu Darshana and Tiruvatavurar Puranam, dating from the 12th century CE (Chola empire) and later, and include:

- He dances within a circular or cyclically closed arch of flames (prabha mandala), which symbolically represent the cosmic fire that in Hindu cosmology creates everything and consumes everything, in cyclic existence or cycle of life. The fire also represents the evils, dangers, heat, warmth, light and joys of daily life. The arch of fire emerges from two makara (mythical water beasts) on each end.
- He looks calm, even through the continuous chain of creation and destruction that maintains the universe, that shows the supreme tranquility of the Atma.
- His legs are bent, which suggests an energetic dance. His long, matted tresses, are shown to be loose and flying out in thin strands during the dance, spread into a fan behind his head, because of the wildness and ecstasy of the dance.
- On his right side, meshed in with one of the flying strands of his hair near his forehead, is typically the river Ganges personified as a goddess, from the Hindu mythology where the danger of a mighty river is creatively tied to a calm river for the regeneration of life.
- His headdress often features a human skull (symbol of mortality), a crescent moon and a flower identified as that of the entheogenic plant Datura metel.
- Four-armed figures are most typical, but ten-armed forms are also found from various places and periods, for example the Badami Caves and Ankor Wat.
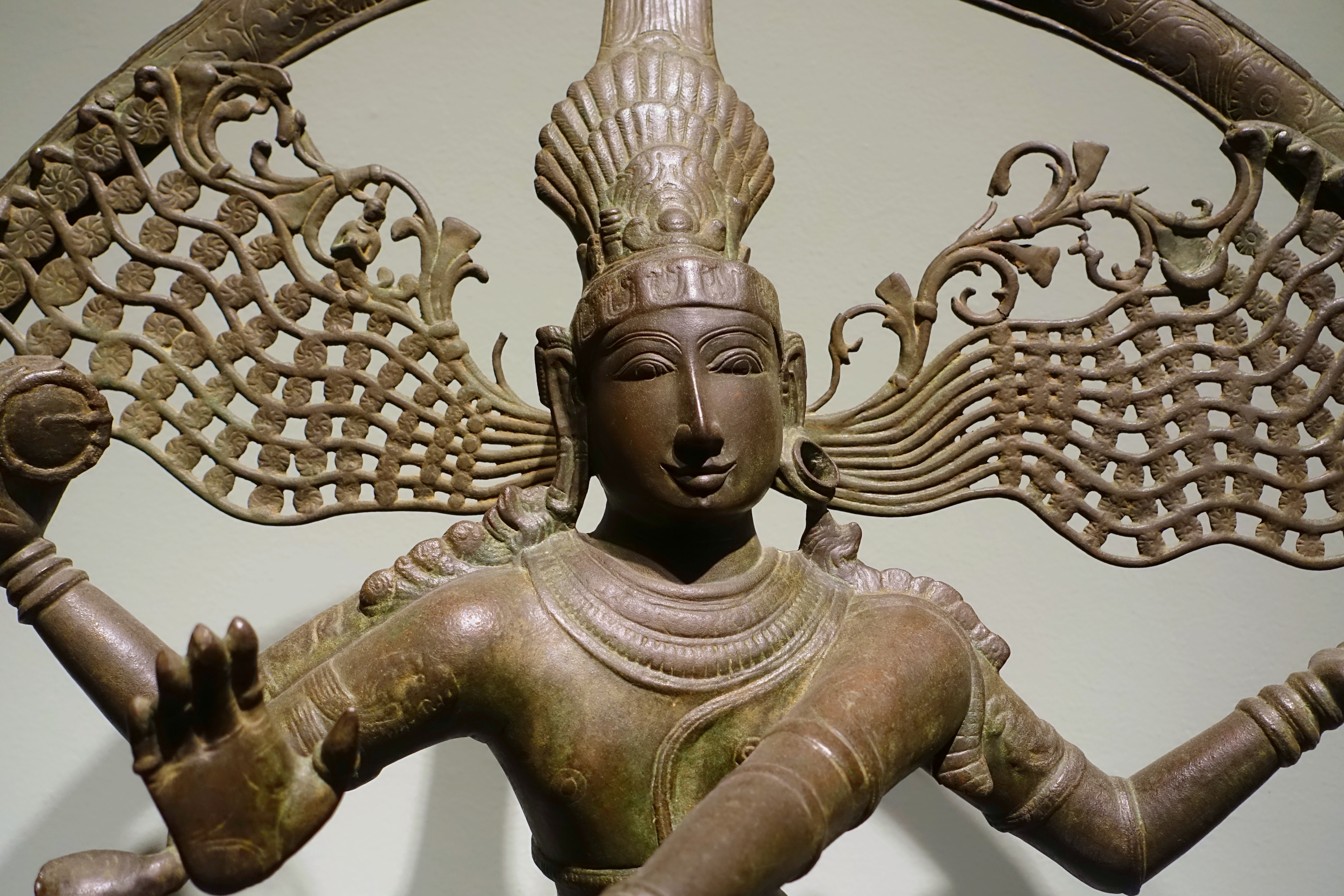
- Detail of Chola bronze
  The upper right hand holds a small drum shaped like an hourglass that is called a ḍamaru in Sanskrit. A specific hand gesture (mudra) called ḍamaru-hasta (Sanskrit for "ḍamaru-hand") is used to hold the drum. It symbolizes rhythm of creation and time.
- The upper left hand contains Agni or fire, which signifies destruction.
- A cobra uncoils from his lower right forearm, while his hand is in the abhaya mudra gesture as a sign to not fear
- The lower left hand is bent downwards at the wrist with the palm facing inward, we also note that this arm crosses Naṭarāja's chest, concealing his heart from view. It represents tirodhāna, which means “occlusion, concealment.”
- The face shows two eyes plus a slightly open third on the forehead, which symbolize the triune in Shaivism. The eyes represent the sun, the moon and the third has been interpreted as the inner eye, or symbol of knowledge (jnana), urging the viewer to seek the inner wisdom, self-realization. The three eyes alternatively symbolize an equilibrium of the three Guṇas: Sattva, Rajas and Tamas.
- The dwarf underneath his foot is the demon Apasmara purusha or Muyalaka, who symbolizes ignorance which Nataraja destroys.
- The slightly smiling face of Shiva represents his calmness despite being immersed in the contrasting forces of universe and his energetic dance.

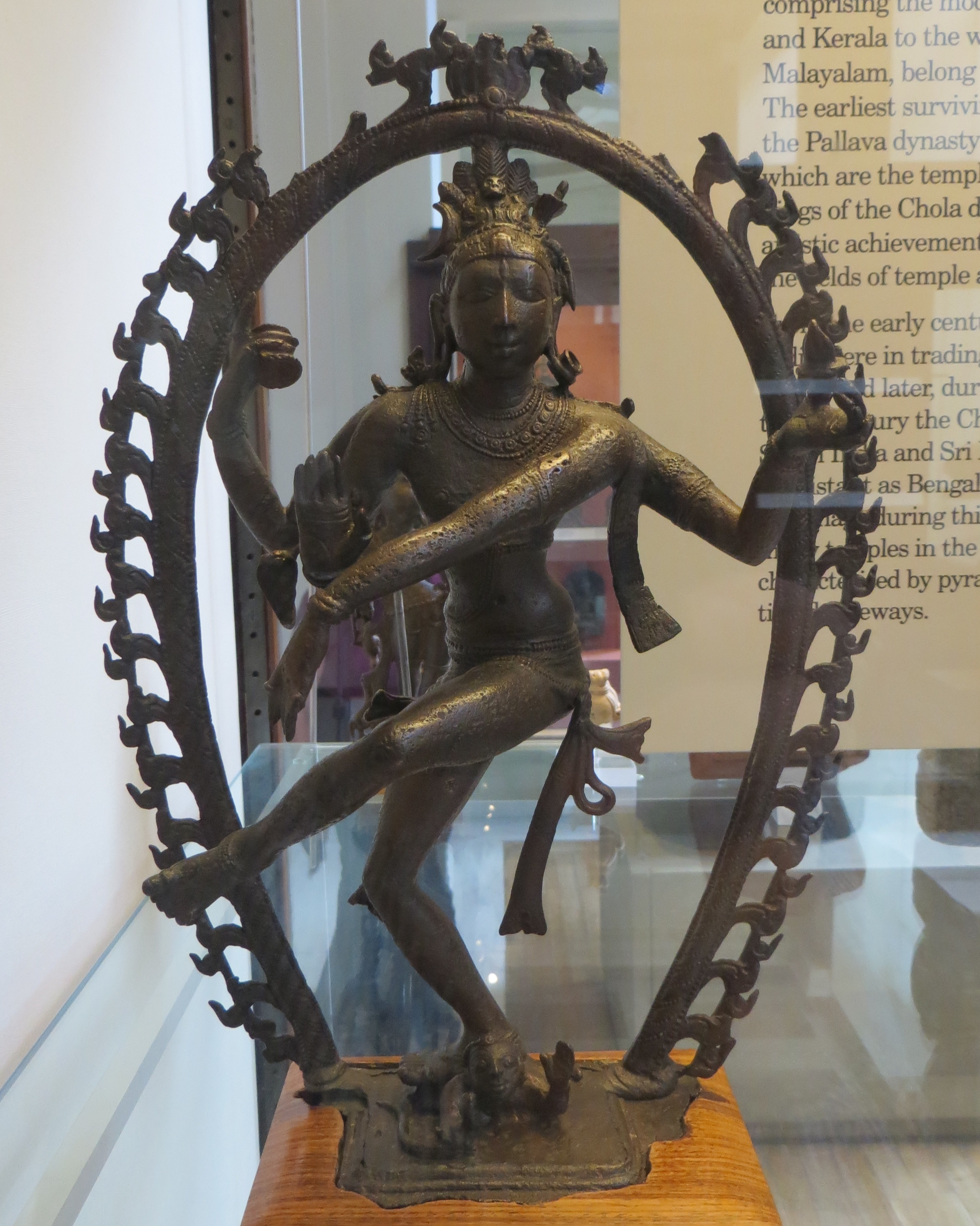
The oldest known Tamil bronze Nataraja, 800 AD, British Museum

Padma Kaimal questions some of these interpretations by referring to a 10th-century text and Nataraja icons, suggesting that the Nataraja statue may have symbolized different things to different people or in different contexts, such as Shiva being the lord of cremation or as an emblem of Chola dynasty. In contrast, Sharada Srinivasan questions the link to Chola, and has presented archaeological evidence suggesting that Nataraja bronzes and dancing Shiva artwork in South India was a Pallava innovation, tracing back to 7th to 9th-centuries, and its symbolism should be pushed back by a few centuries.

== Interpretation ==
Coomaraswamy summarizes the significance of Shiva's entire dance as an image of his rhythmic or musical play which is the source of all movement within the universe, represented by the arch surrounding Shiva. Secondly, the purpose of his dance is to release the souls of all men from illusion. And third, the place of the dance, Chidambaram, which is portrayed as the center of the universe, is actually within the heart.

James Lochtefeld states that Nataraja symbolizes "the connection between religion and the arts", and it represents Shiva as the lord of dance, encompassing all "creation, destruction and all things in between". The Nataraja iconography incorporates contrasting elements, a fearless celebration of the joys of dance while being surrounded by fire, untouched by forces of ignorance and evil, signifying a spirituality that transcends all duality. Furthermore, Carole and Pasquale note that the deity showcases the eternal cycle of life (Jiva) from death to rebirth, and how a human being should conquer spiritual ignorance and attain self-realization.

In the hymn of Manikkavacakar's Thiruvasagam, he testifies that at Nataraja Temple, Chidambaram had, by the pre-Chola period, an abstract or 'cosmic' symbolism linked to five elements (Pancha Bhoota). Nataraja is a significant visual interpretation of Brahman and a dance posture of Shiva. The details in the Nataraja artwork have attracted commentaries and secondary literature such as poems detailing its theological significance. It is one of the widely studied and supreme illustrations of Hindu art from the medieval era.

Srinivasan notes that Nataraja is described as Satcitananda or "Being, Consciousness and Bliss" in the Shaiva Siddhanta text Kunchitangrim Bhaje, resembling the Advaita doctrine, or "abstract monism" of Adi Shankara, which holds the individual Self (Jīvātman) and supreme Self (Paramātmā) to be one, while "an earlier hymn to Nataraja by Manikkavachakar ... identifies him with the unitary supreme consciousness, by using Tamil word 'Or Unarve', rather than Sanskrit 'chit'." This may point to an "osmosis" of ideas in medieval India.

According to Ian Crawford, professor of planetary science at University of London, the cosmic dance of Shiva as Nataraja represents particle physics, entropy and the dissolution of the universe.

== In dance and modern yoga ==
In modern yoga as exercise, Natarajasana is a posture resembling Nataraja and named for him in the 20th century. A similar pose appears in the classical Indian dance form Bharatanatyam.

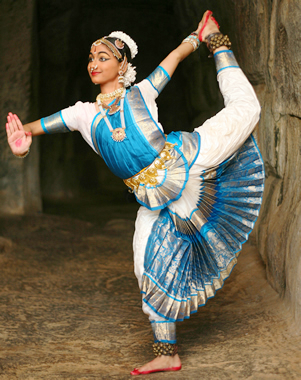
Nataraja pose in Bharatanatyam classical Indian dance

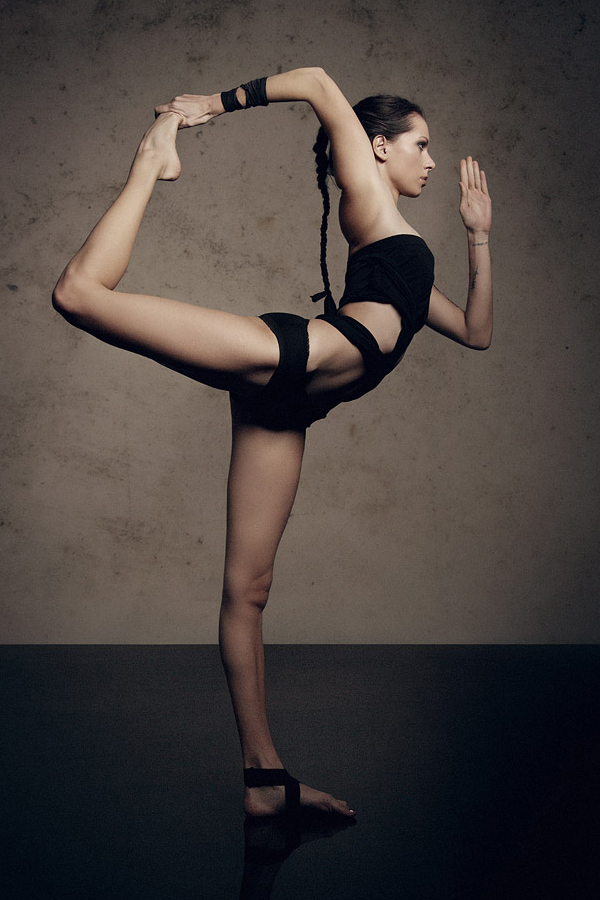
Natarajasana in modern yoga as exercise

== Gallery ==
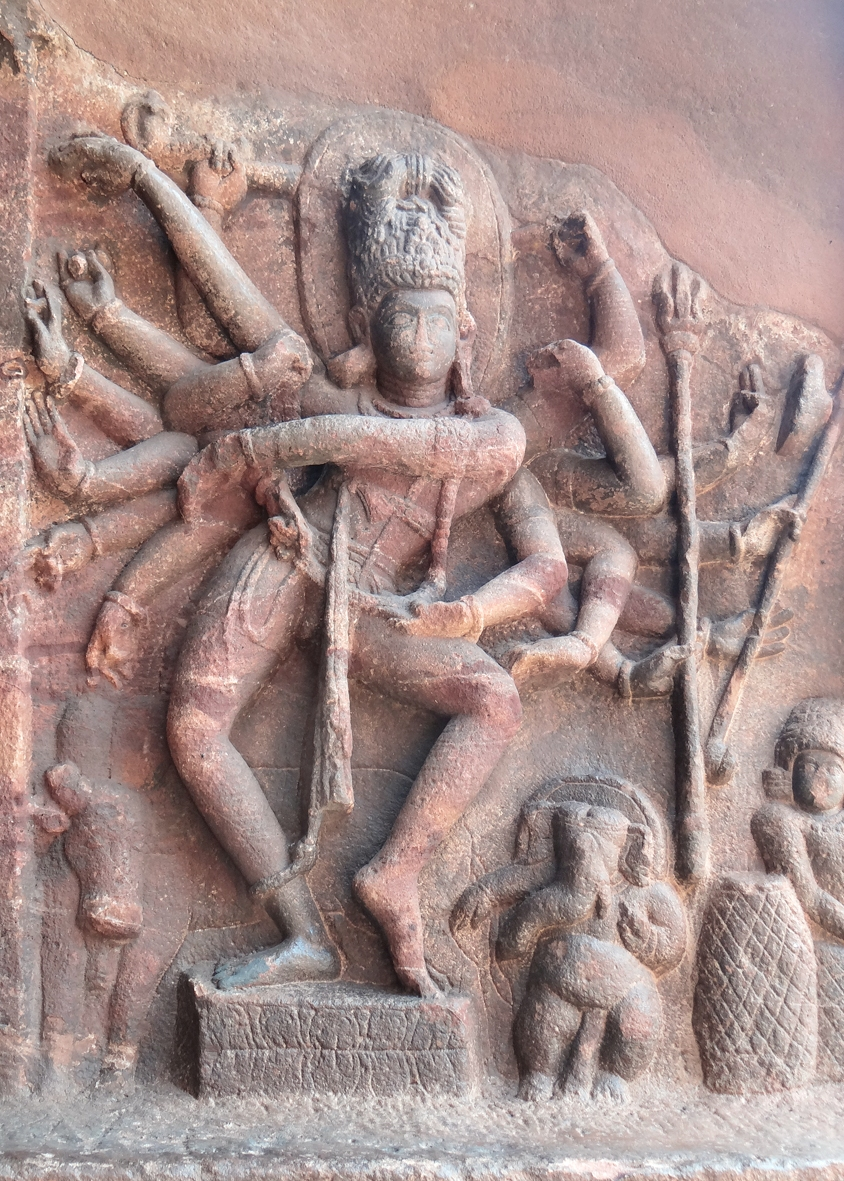
6th/7th century Nataraja in Cave 1 of Badami cave temples

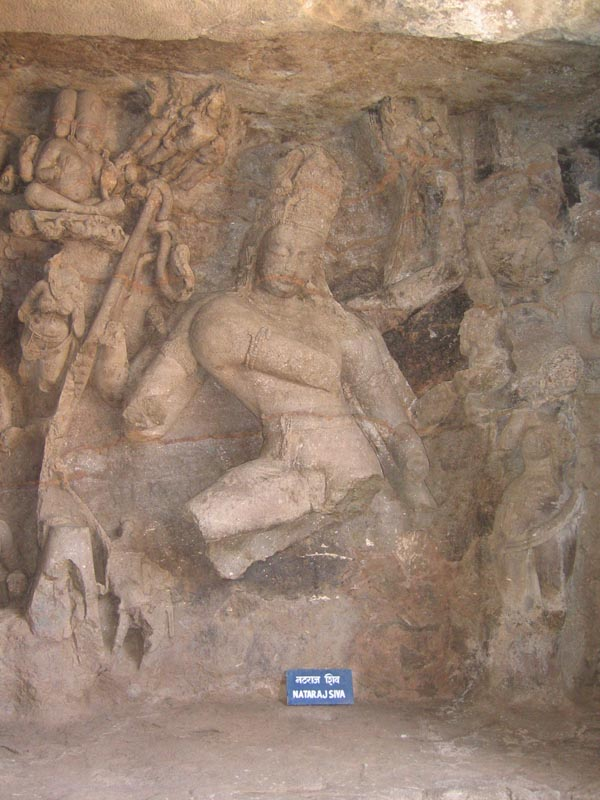
A damaged 6th-century Nataraja, Elephanta Caves

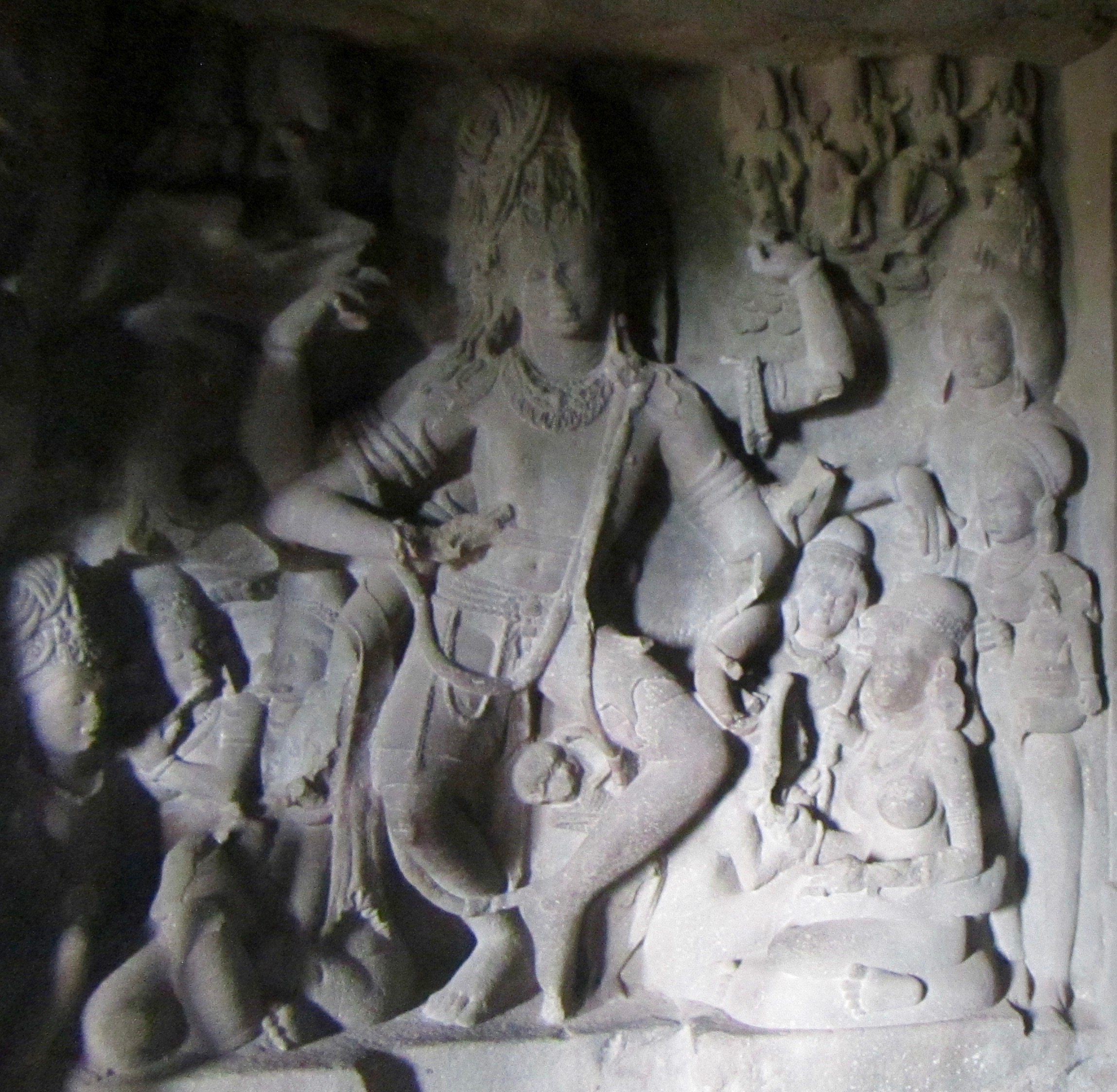
6th-century Nataraja in Cave 21, Ellora Caves

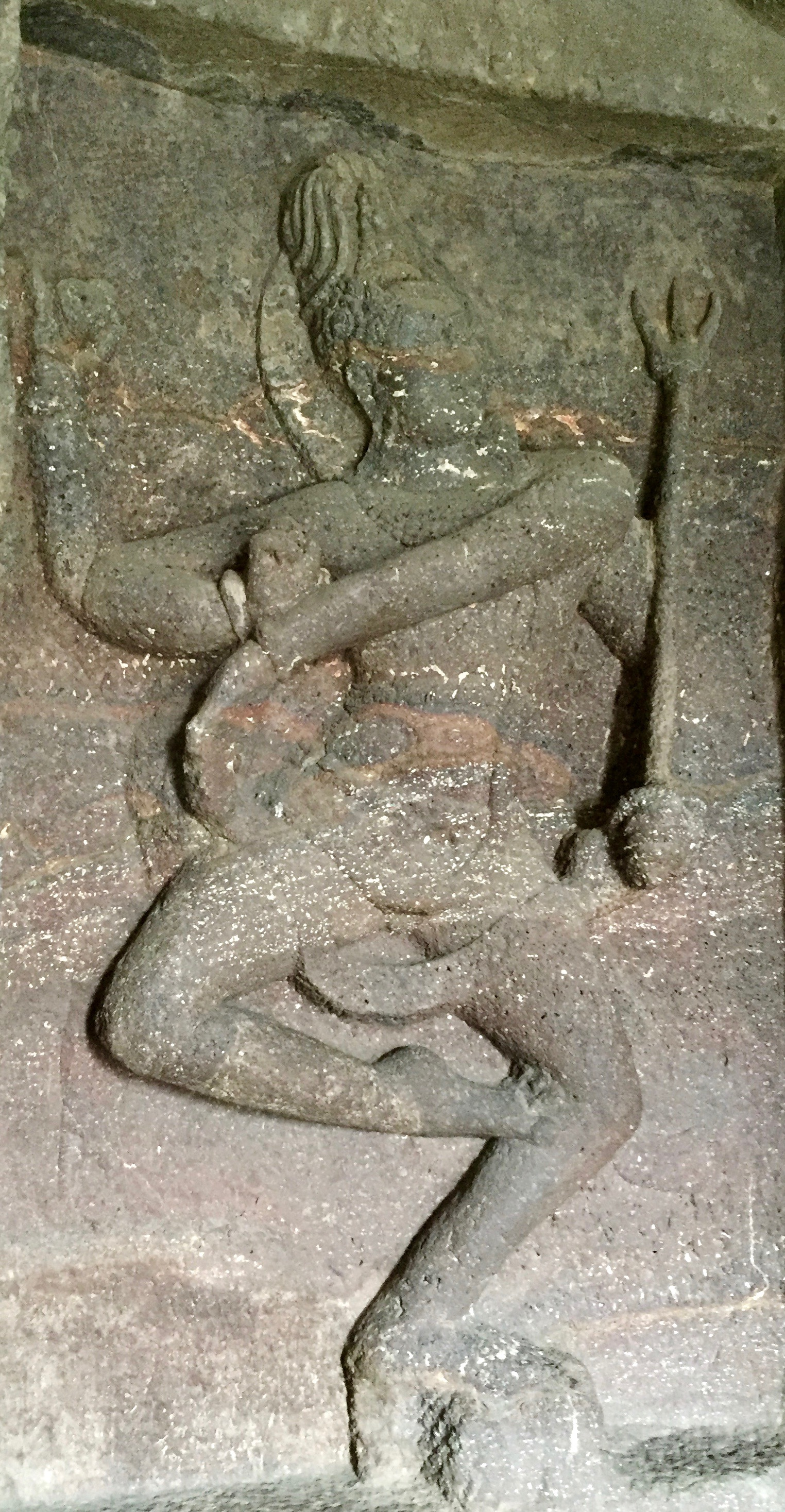
8th-century Nataraja in Kailasa temple (Cave 16), Ellora Caves

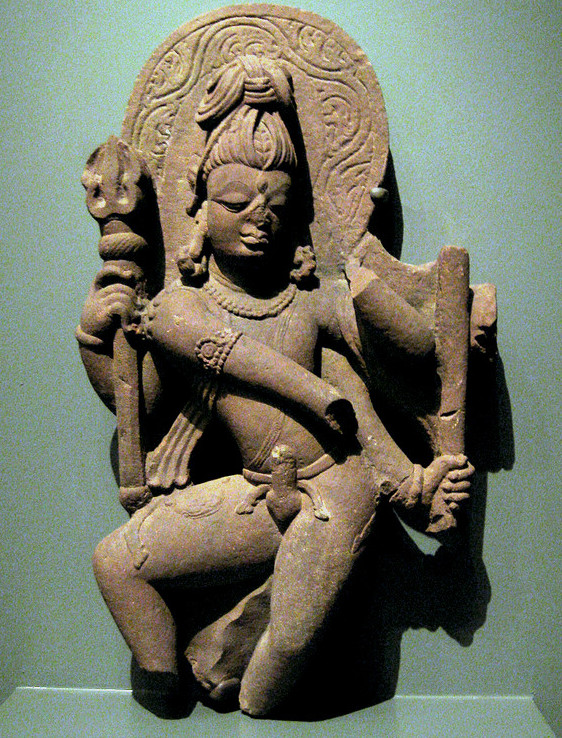
Ithyphallic 8th-century sandstone Nataraja from Madhya Pradesh

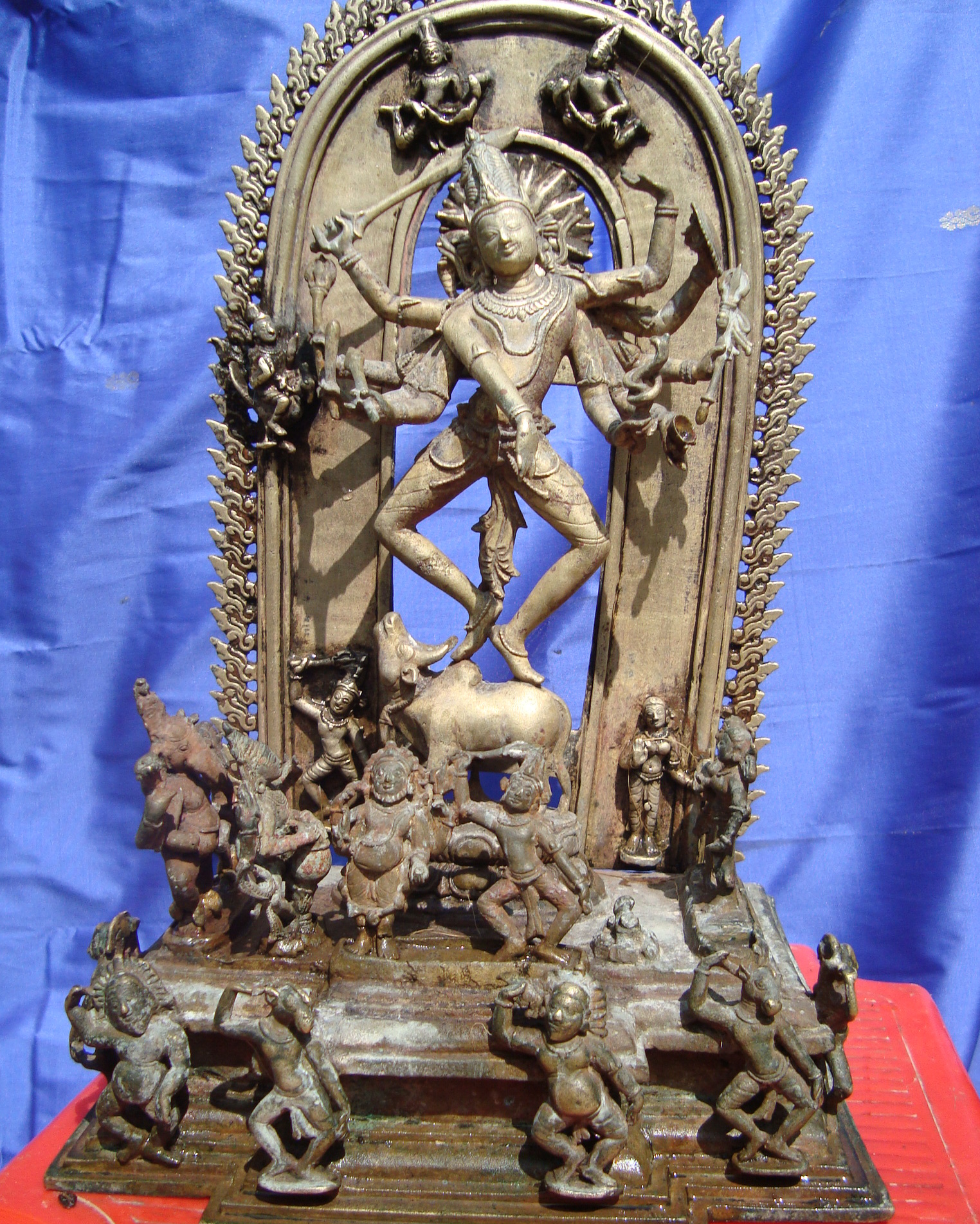
In the Shiva temple of Melakadambur is a rare Pala image that shows the ten-armed Nataraja dancing on his bull, Nandi

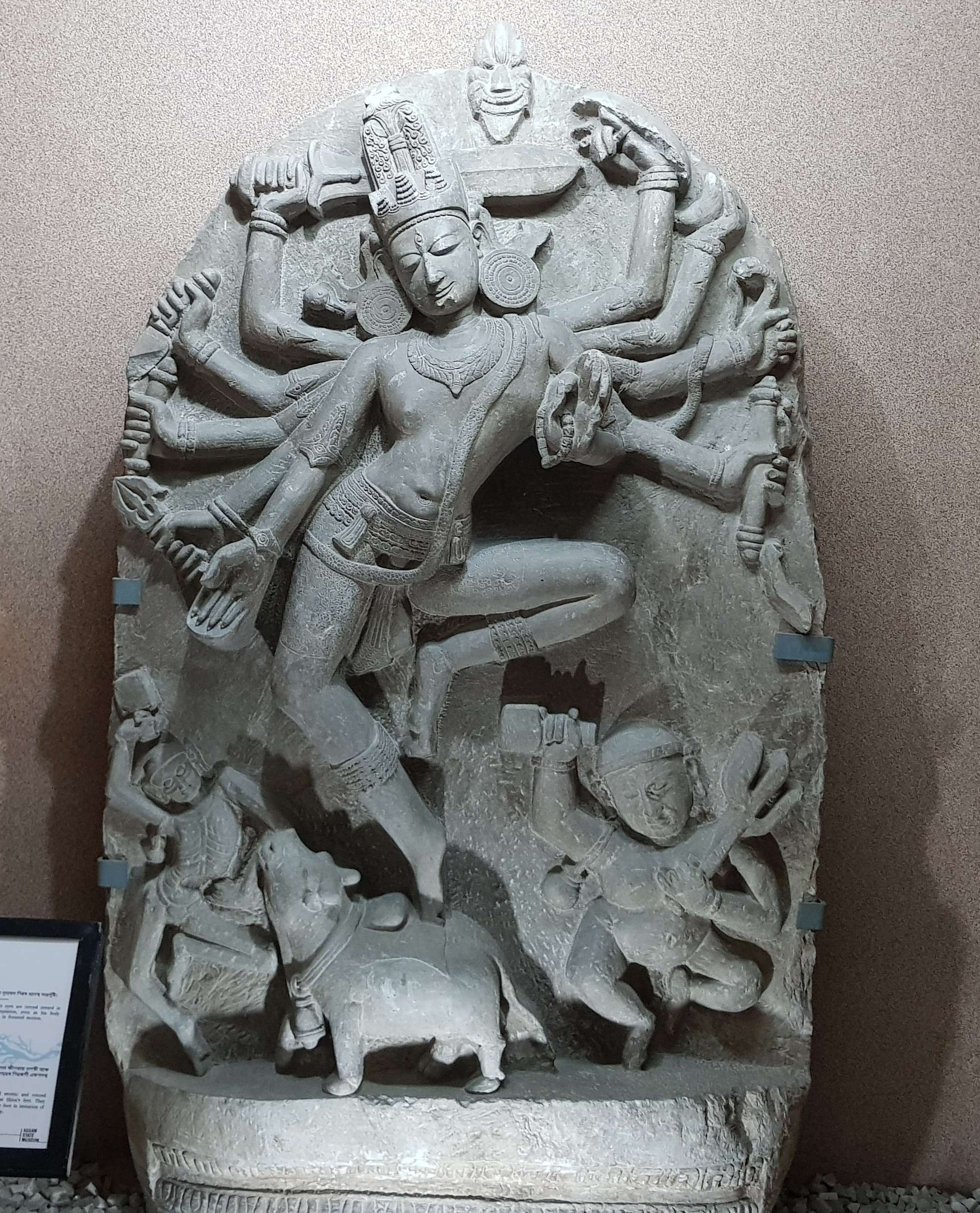
Nataraja sculpture from Medieval Assam

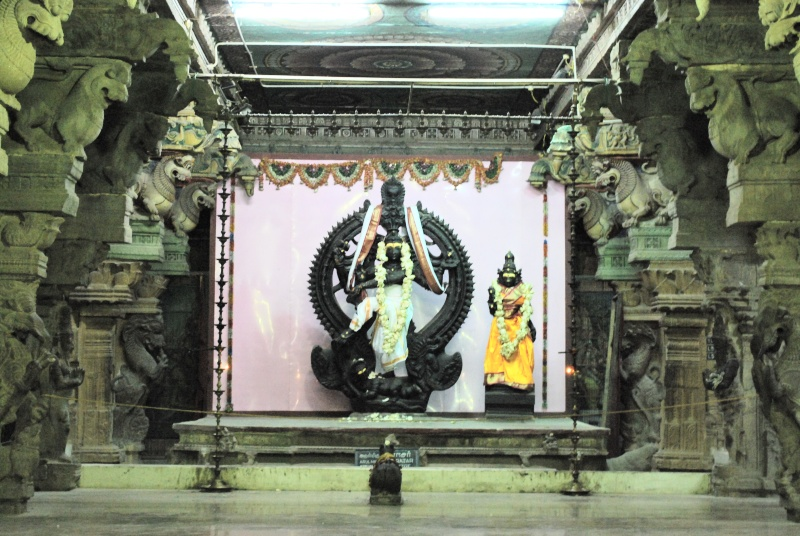
Shiva-Nataraja in the Thousand-Pillar-Hall of Meenakshi Temple in Madurai, Tamil Nadu

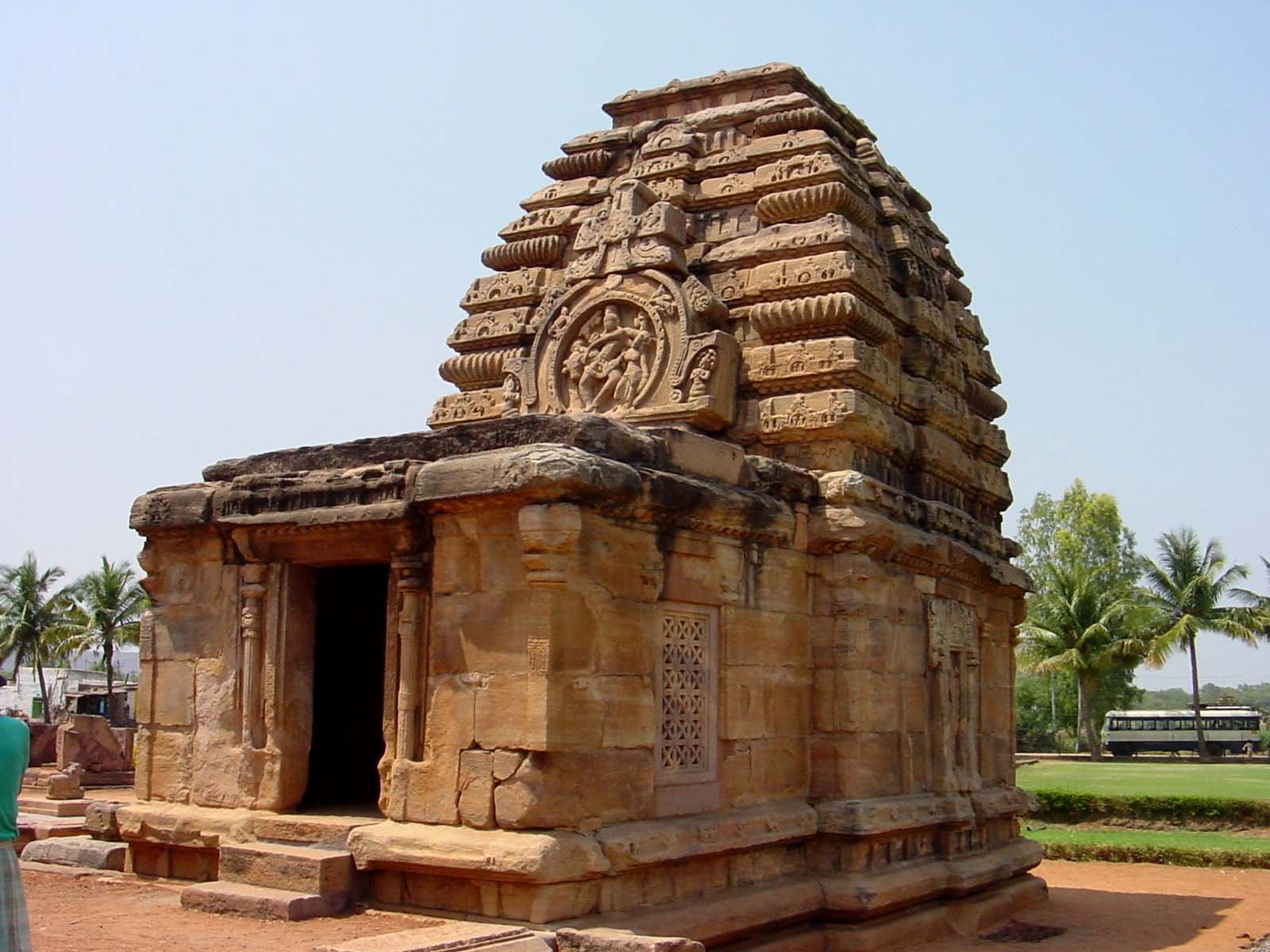
Sukanasa with Shiva Nataraja in Pattadakal, Karnataka

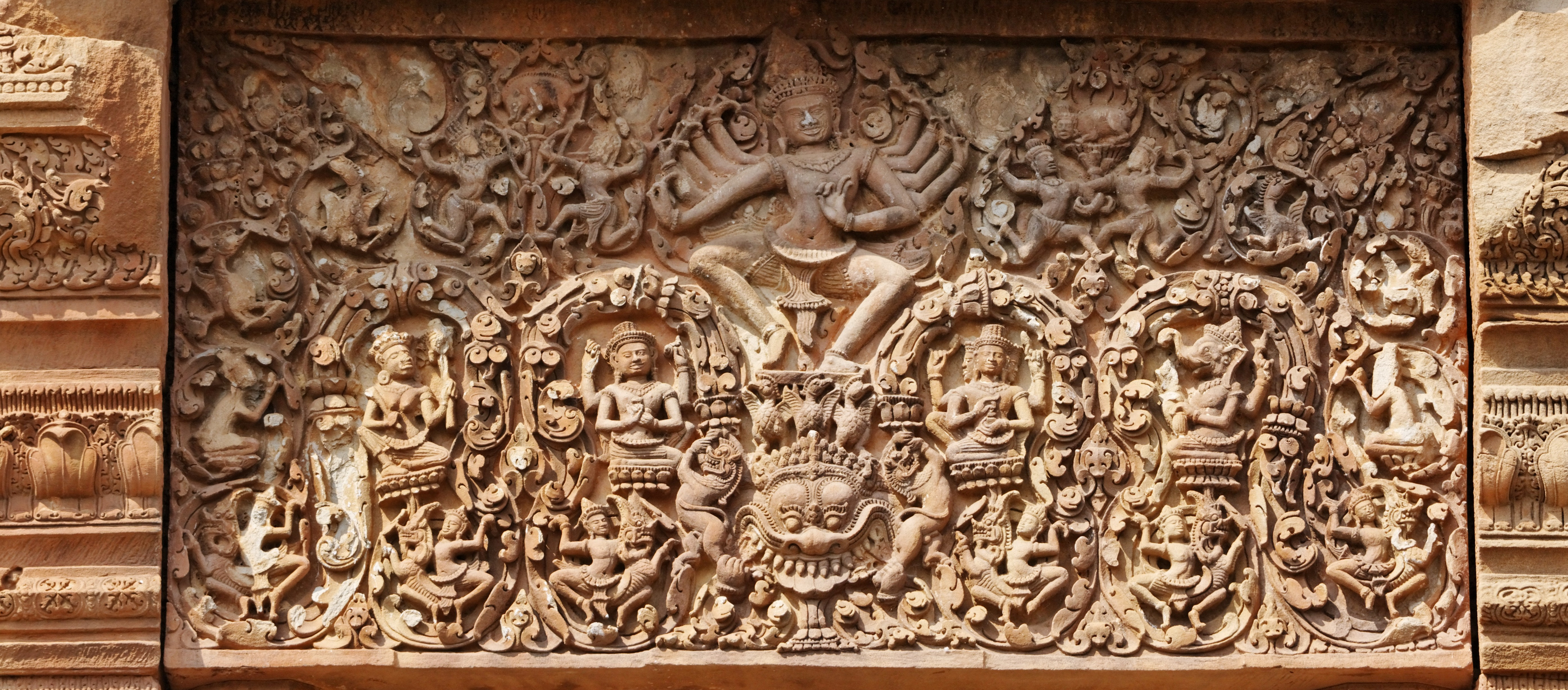
Khmer relief, 12th-century, Prasat Sikhoraphum in Surin, Thailand

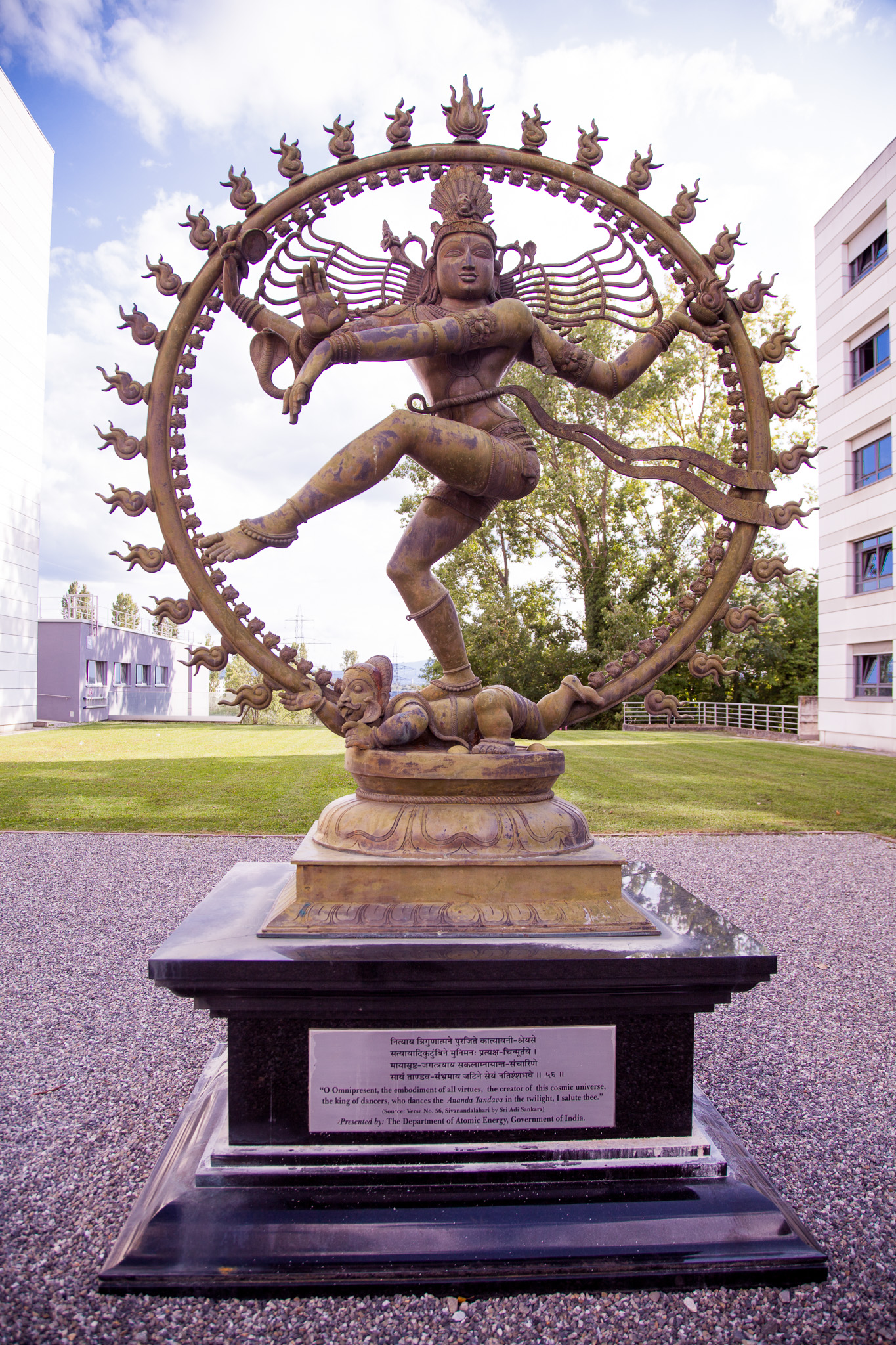
Modern statue gifted by India at CERN in Geneva, Switzerland
