= Apasmara =

Sanskrit term and being in Hindu mythology

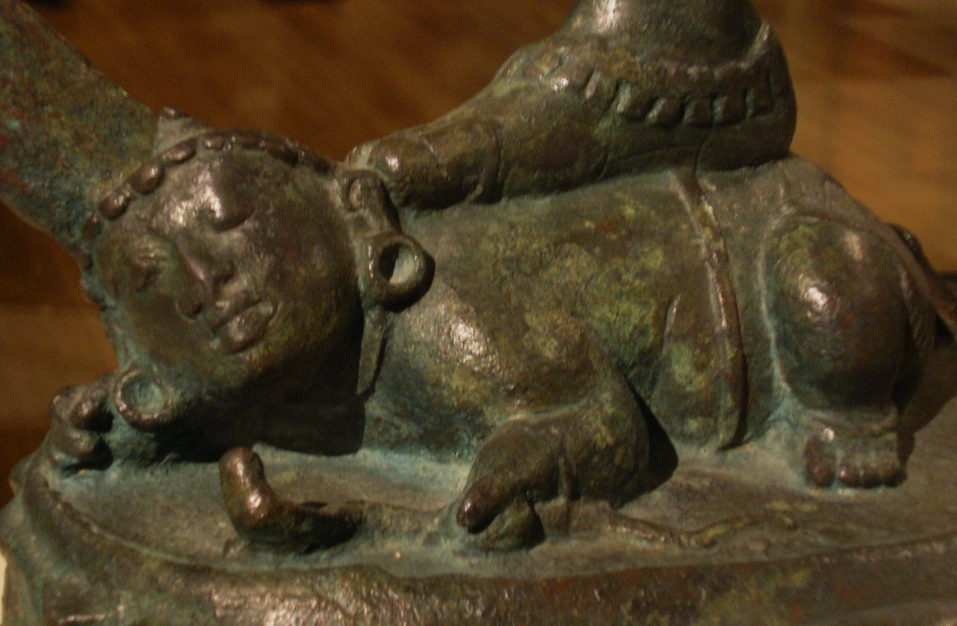
Apasmara, clutching a cobra and trampled beneath the foot of Nataraja (Shiva as lord of dance).

Apasmara (Sanskrit: अपस्मार, IAST: Apasmāra) is a diminutive man who represents spiritual ignorance and ahamkara in Hindu mythology. He is also known as Muyalaka or Muyalakan.

== Etymology and definition ==
The suffix smāra (from smaranam) means memory. The compound apasmāra means loss of memory, which corresponds to conditions such as dementia or amnesia. It can also imply gibberish (unintelligible speech) or ego (Ahamkara). Apasmara in Ayurveda referred to neurological disorders characterized by memory loss rather than speech issues. Due to the lack of modern diagnostic tools such as brain scanning at the time, the exact conditions described remain uncertain.

== Theological and symbolic significance ==
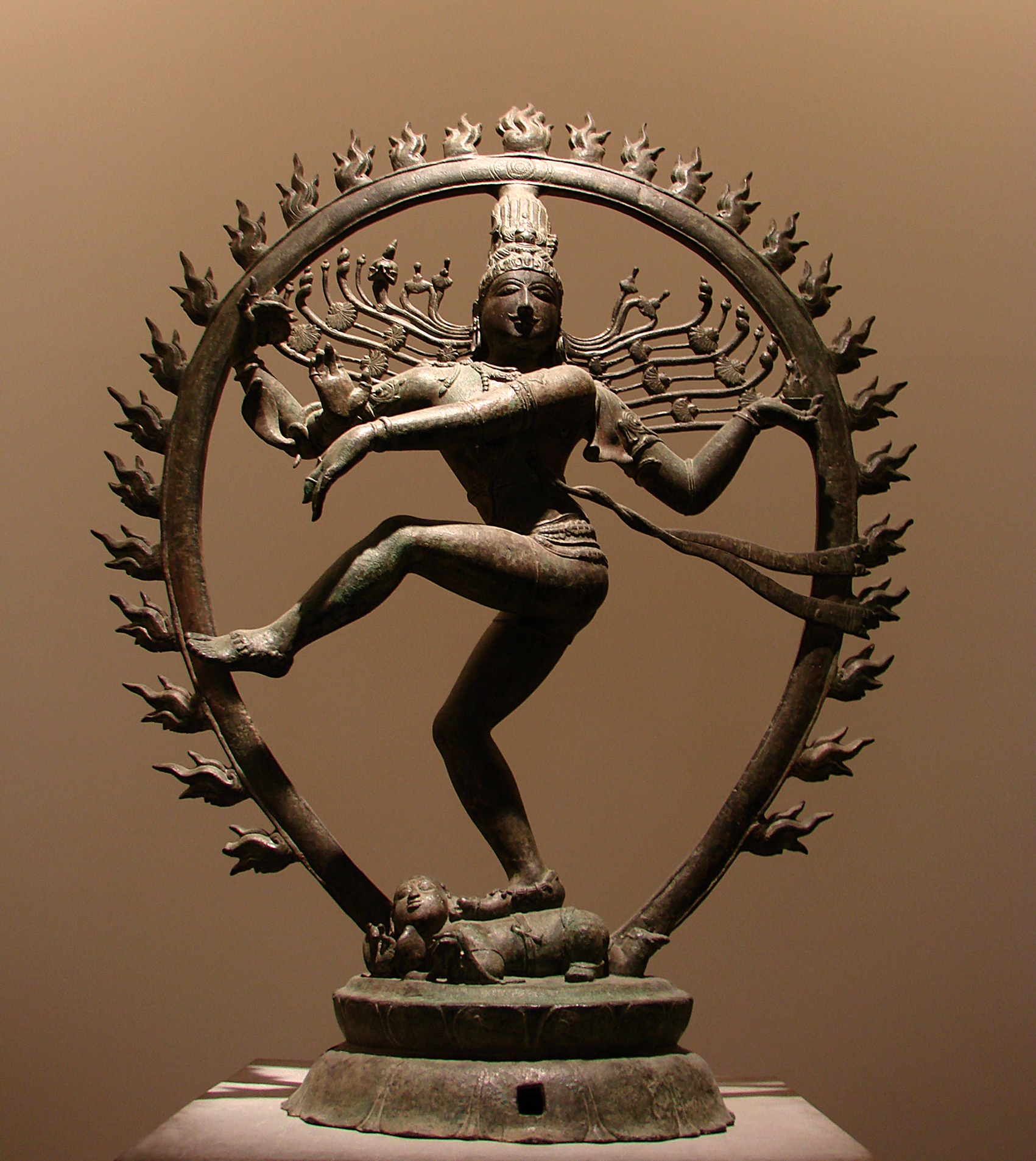
Nataraja dancing the cosmic dance of creation, destruction and moksha (ultimate liberation) upon the prone body of Apasmara, the demon of avidya (ignorance or lack of spiritual insight) – Chola bronze, Musée Guimet.

Apasmara, depicted as a diminutive man, is often shown in Hindu iconography clutching a cobra, which symbolizes (ahamkara) in Shaivite tradition.

Ahamkara, literally means the "I-maker", and is the faculty by which jivas (souls) identify with the physical body rather than their higher self. The Shiva Purana describes ahamkara as originating from Prakriti (nature). Apasmara symbolizes the ignorance of selfhood (ahamkara), a universal, cosmic form of ignorance essential for jivas to function in samsara across their countless rebirths by forgetting past lives and identifying with a new body each time. This "necessary evil" of Apasmara is part of the cosmic balance between spiritual knowledge and the inherent ignorance in one's sense of self, and cannot be eradicated without disrupting the cosmic order.

To enable moksha (transcendence) while preserving the cosmic balance between spiritual knowledge and ignorance inherent in samsara, Apasmara must be subdued rather than killed. To suppress Apasmara, Shiva assumes the form of Nataraja—the Lord of Dance—and performs the cosmic dance of tāṇḍava. During this dance, Shiva subdues Apasmara under his right foot, symbolizing the subjugation of ignorance and ahamkara. Apasmara is believed to remain eternally subdued beneath Nataraja's foot, with Shiva perpetually maintaining this balance through his cosmic dance. Similar symbolism is seen in representations of Dakshinamurti, another form of Shiva as a guru, where Apasmara is subdued under Shiva’s right foot.

English writer and philosopher, Aldous Huxley has described and summarized the symbolism of Nataraja and Apasmara, also known as Muyalaka in his utopian novel, Island:

Nataraja's right foot is planted squarely on a horrible little subhuman creature - the demon, Muyalaka. A dwarf, but immensely powerful in his malignity, Muyalaka is the embodiment of ignorance, the manifestation of greedy, possessive selfhood. Stamp on him, break his back! And that's precisely what Nataraja is doing. Trampling the little monster down under his right foot. But notice that it isn't at this trampling foot that he points his finger; it's at the left foot, the foot that, as he dances, he's in the act of raising from the ground. And why does he point at it? Why? That lifted foot, that dancing defiance of the force of gravity - it's the symbol of release, of moksha, of liberation.

== Disease concept in Ayurveda ==
The concept of Apasmara in Āyurveda relates to a group of neurological disorders, one of which may be identified as epilepsy: according to Maharṣi Caraka, there are 4 types of apasmāra. These 4 types of apasmara are Vataja, Pitaja, Kapahaja and Sannipataja.These can be related to conditions associated with loss of memory like amnesia and dementia or temporal lobe epilepsy with fugue states or hysteria. Charakhas instituted this classification depending upon the different doshas of the body.

== See also ==
- Nataraja
- Ātman (Hinduism)
- Hindu philosophy
- Mysticism
- Temporal lobe epilepsy
- Geschwind syndrome

== Sources ==
- Dictionary of Hindu Lore and Legend (ISBN 0-500-51088-1) by Anna Dallapiccola
