= Natarajasana =

Yoga pose

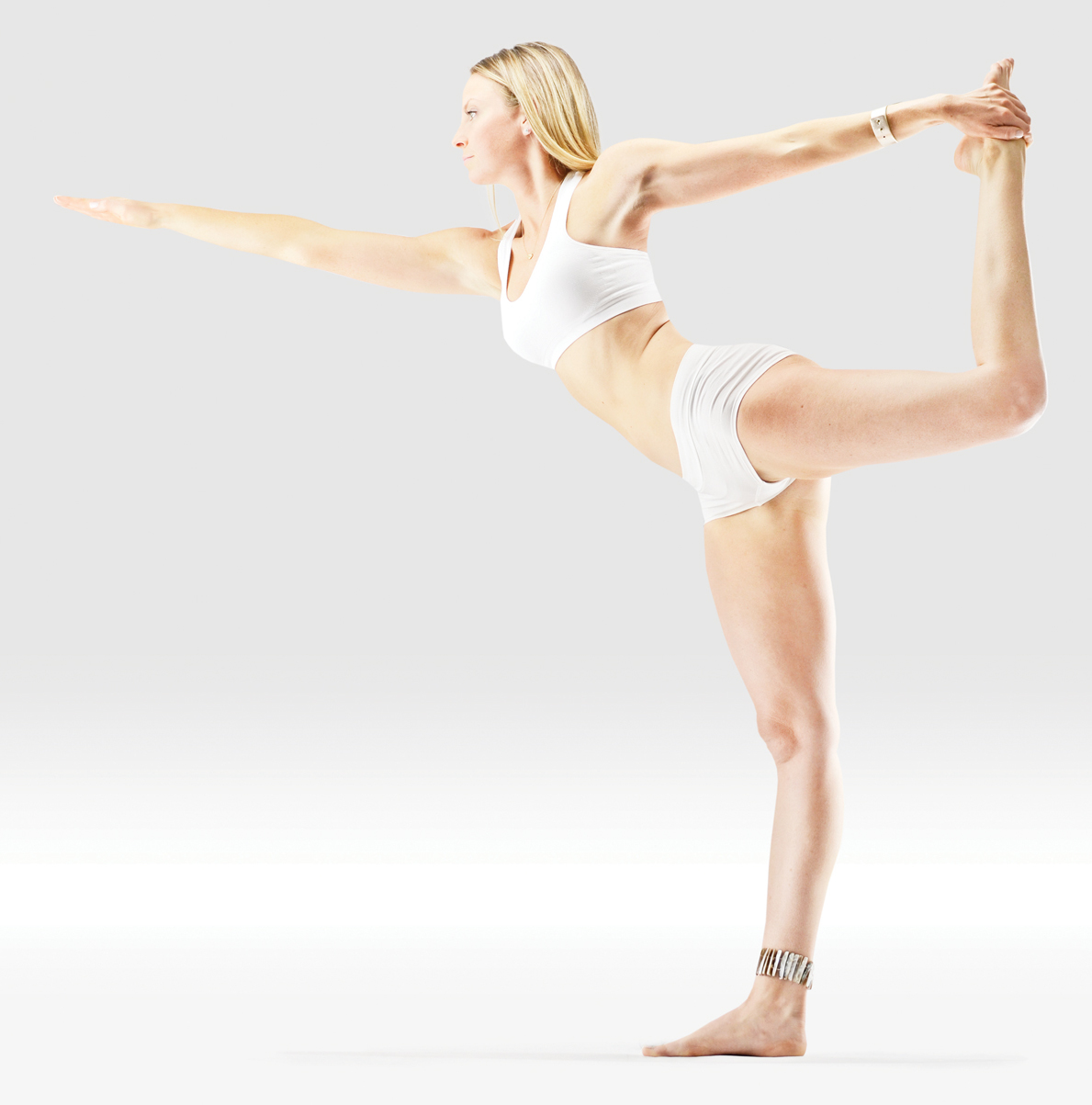
Natarajasana, Lord of the Dance Pose

Natarajasana (Sanskrit: नटराजासन, romanized: Naṭarājāsana), Lord of the Dance Pose or Dancer Pose is a standing, balancing, back-bending asana in modern yoga as exercise. It is derived from a pose in the classical Indian dance form Bharatnatyam, which is depicted in temple statues in the Nataraja Temple, Chidambaram. Nataraja, the "Dancing King", is in turn an aspect of the Hindu God Shiva, depicted in bronze statues from the Chola dynasty. The asana was most likely introduced into modern yoga by Krishnamacharya in the early 20th century, and taken up by his pupils, such as B. K. S. Iyengar, who made the pose his signature. Natarajasana is among the yoga poses often used in advertising, denoting desirable qualities such as flexibility and grace.

== Etymology and mythology ==
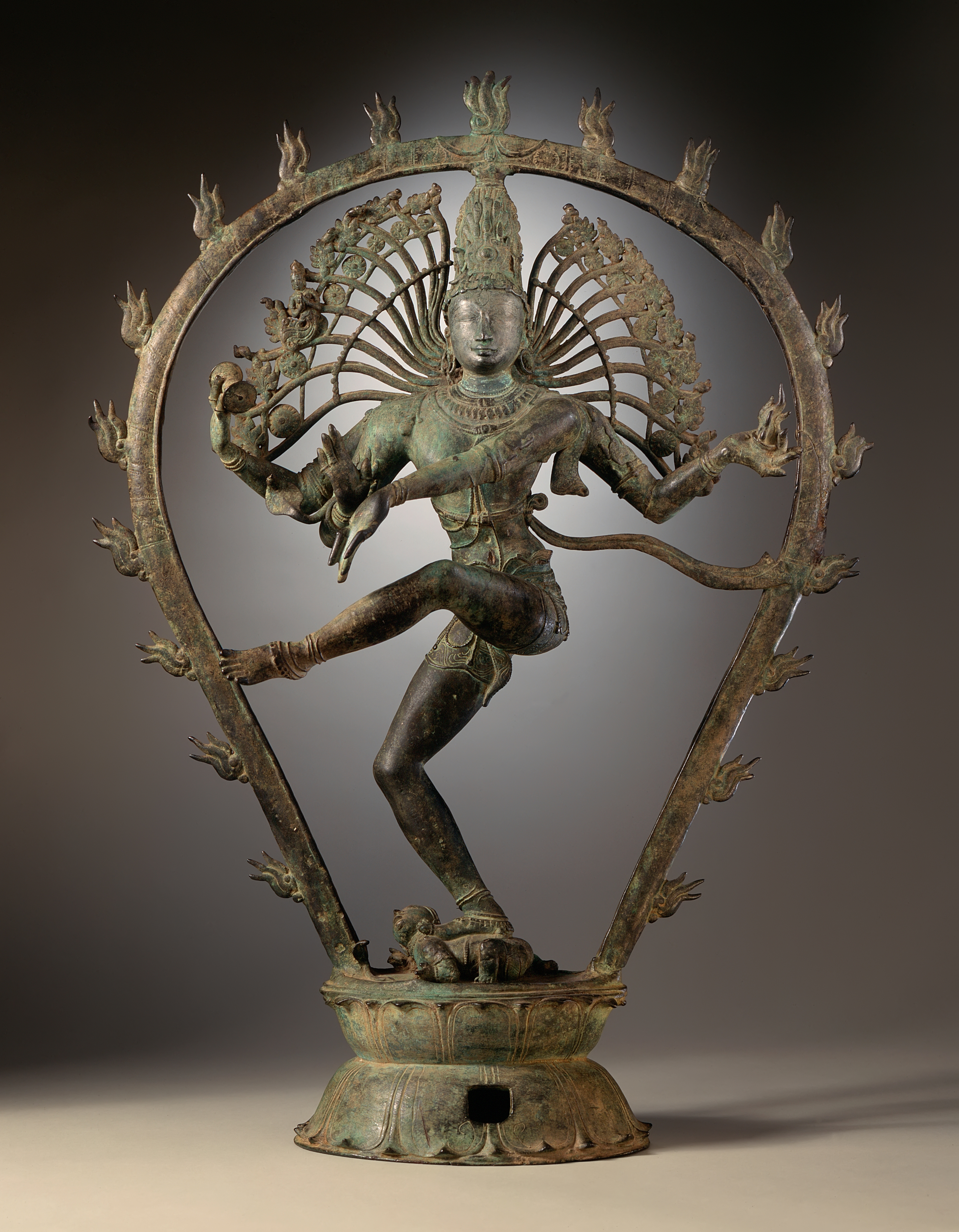
10th century Shiva as Nataraja, the lord of the dance. Chola dynasty

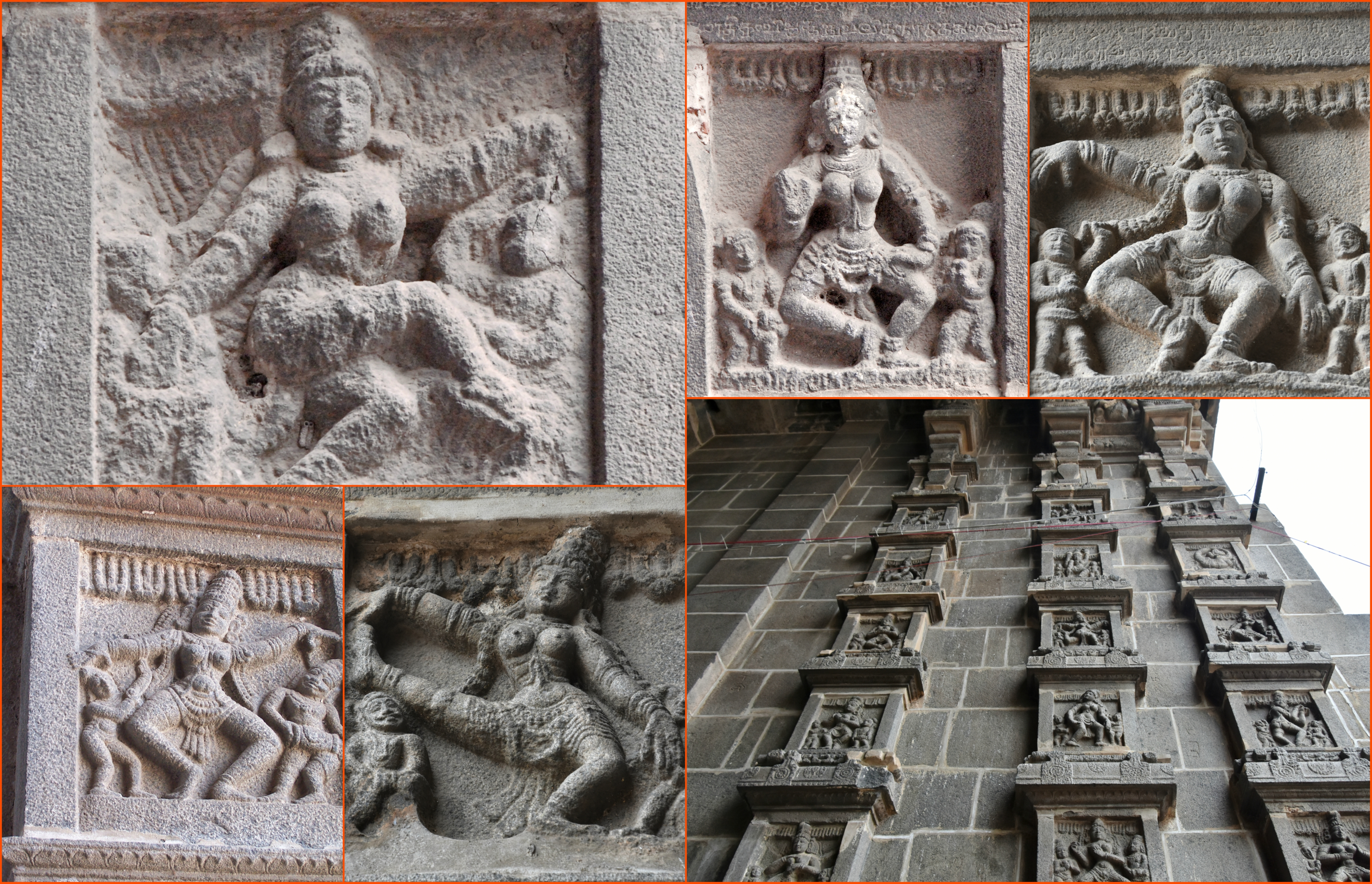
13th century dance mudras on Nataraja Temple, Chidambaram's eastern gopuram

The name comes from the Sanskrit epithet नटराज Naṭarāja, "Dancing King", (Note: Shiva's epithet Nataraja comes from the Sanskrit words नट nata meaning "dancer", and राज rāja meaning "king".) one of the names given to the Hindu God Shiva in his form as the cosmic dancer, and आसन āsana meaning "posture" or "seat". Nataraja is the aspect of Shiva "whose ecstatic dance of destruction lays the foundation for the creation and sustenance of the universe." The significance of the image of the dancing Shiva is indicated by his gestures: he is depicted with four arms, standing on Avidya, the demon of ignorance. In his hands he beats out time on a drum, and holds the flame of Vidya, knowledge. Sometimes he holds a conch shell, signifying Om, the universal cosmic sound. He holds up a hand in the gesture of fearlessness, Abhayamudra.

The pose is among some twenty asanas depicted in 13th – 18th century Bharatnatyam dance statues of the Eastern Gopuram, Nataraja Temple, Chidambaram.

== In modern yoga ==
Iyengar, Natarajasana, and 20th century yoga
The yoga guru B. K. S. Iyengar in Natarajasana	"As the signature pose of Iyengar, the most acclaimed master of postural yoga, Natarajasana became the representative yoga pose of the late 20th century... Iyengar saw himself as Nataraja's avatar. And he clearly (sometimes desperately) wanted us to see him as the incarnation of Nataraja. So he came close to conflating the yogin and the dancer." — Elliott Goldberg

The yoga scholar Elliott Goldberg observes that Natarajasana is not found in any medieval hatha yoga text, nor is it mentioned by any pre-20th century traveller to India, or found in artistic depictions of yoga such as the Sritattvanidhi or the Mahamandir near Jodhpur. Goldberg argues that the pose, like several others, was introduced into modern yoga by Krishnamacharya in the early 20th century, and taken up by his pupils such as B. K. S. Iyengar, who made the pose a signature of modern yoga; Goldberg suggests that Iyengar transmitted the pose also to Sivananda, as Iyengar sent him a complete photo album showing Iyengar in all his asanas. Iyengar writes in the coverage of Natarajasana in his Light on Yoga that the god Shiva created over 100 dances, from gentle to fierce, of which the best-known is the Tāṇḍava, "the cosmic dance of destruction". He describes Natarajasana as a "vigorous and beautiful pose", and is pictured demonstrating the pose on the cover of some editions of his book.

== Description ==
This aesthetic, stretching and balancing asana is said to require concentration and grace; it is used in the Indian classical dance form Bharatanatyam. The actor Mariel Hemingway describes Natarajasana as "a beautiful pose with tremendous power", comparing the balance and tension in the arms and legs with an archery bow, and calling it "a very difficult pose to hold."

The pose is entered from standing in Tadasana, bending one knee and stretching that foot back until it can be grasped with the hand on that side. The foot can then be extended back and up, arching the back and stretching out the other arm forwards. For the full pose and a stronger stretch, reverse the rear arm by lifting it over the shoulder, and grasp the foot.

== Variations ==
Reaching up and back with both arms, elbows upwards, to grasp the rear foot gives a more intense pose.

The pose can be modified by grasping a strap around the rear foot, or by holding on to a support such as a wall or chair.

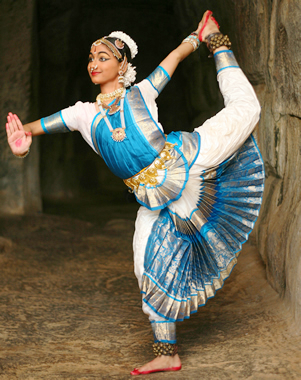
Natarajasana in Bharatanatyam classical Indian dance

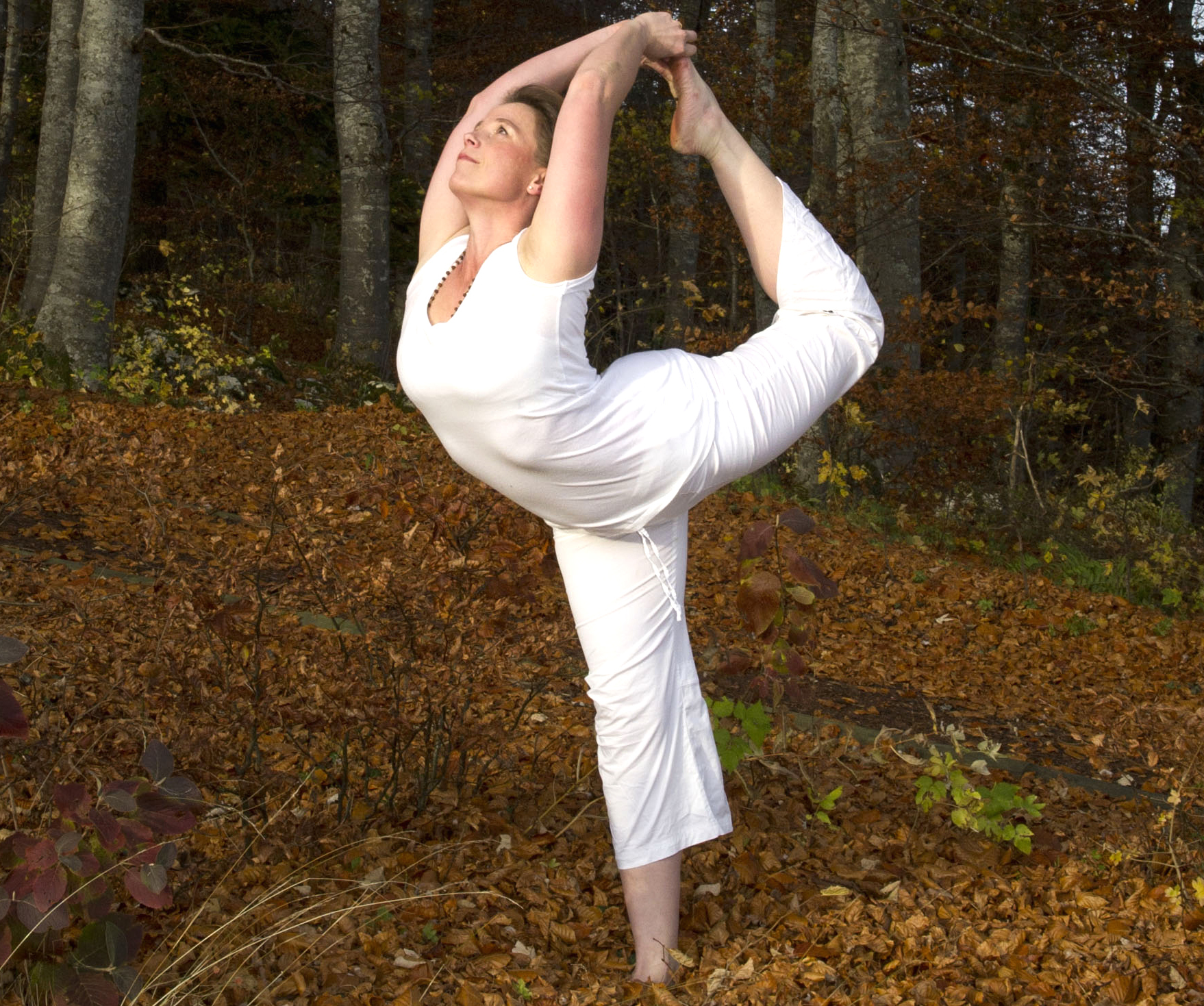
Variation with both hands grasping the raised foot

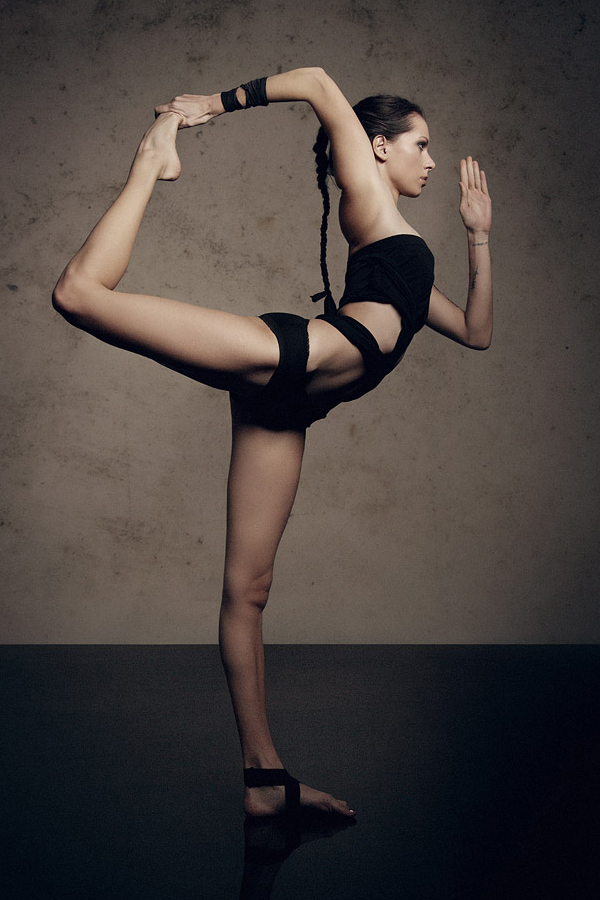
A variation demonstrated by the Russian yoga teacher Nina Mel

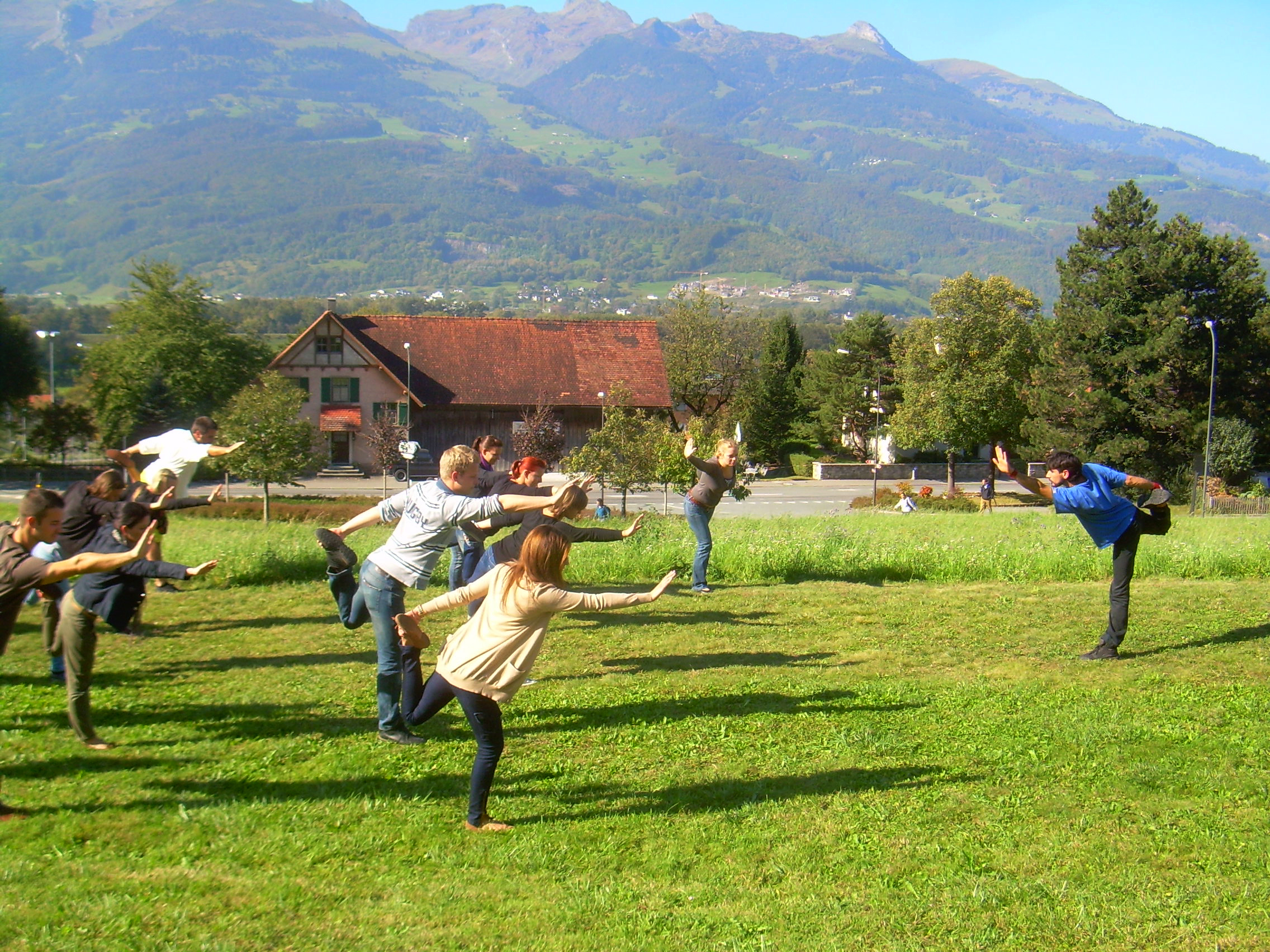
Outdoor class in Liechtenstein

== See also ==
- List of asanas
