= Lasya =

Sanskrit term for a female dance

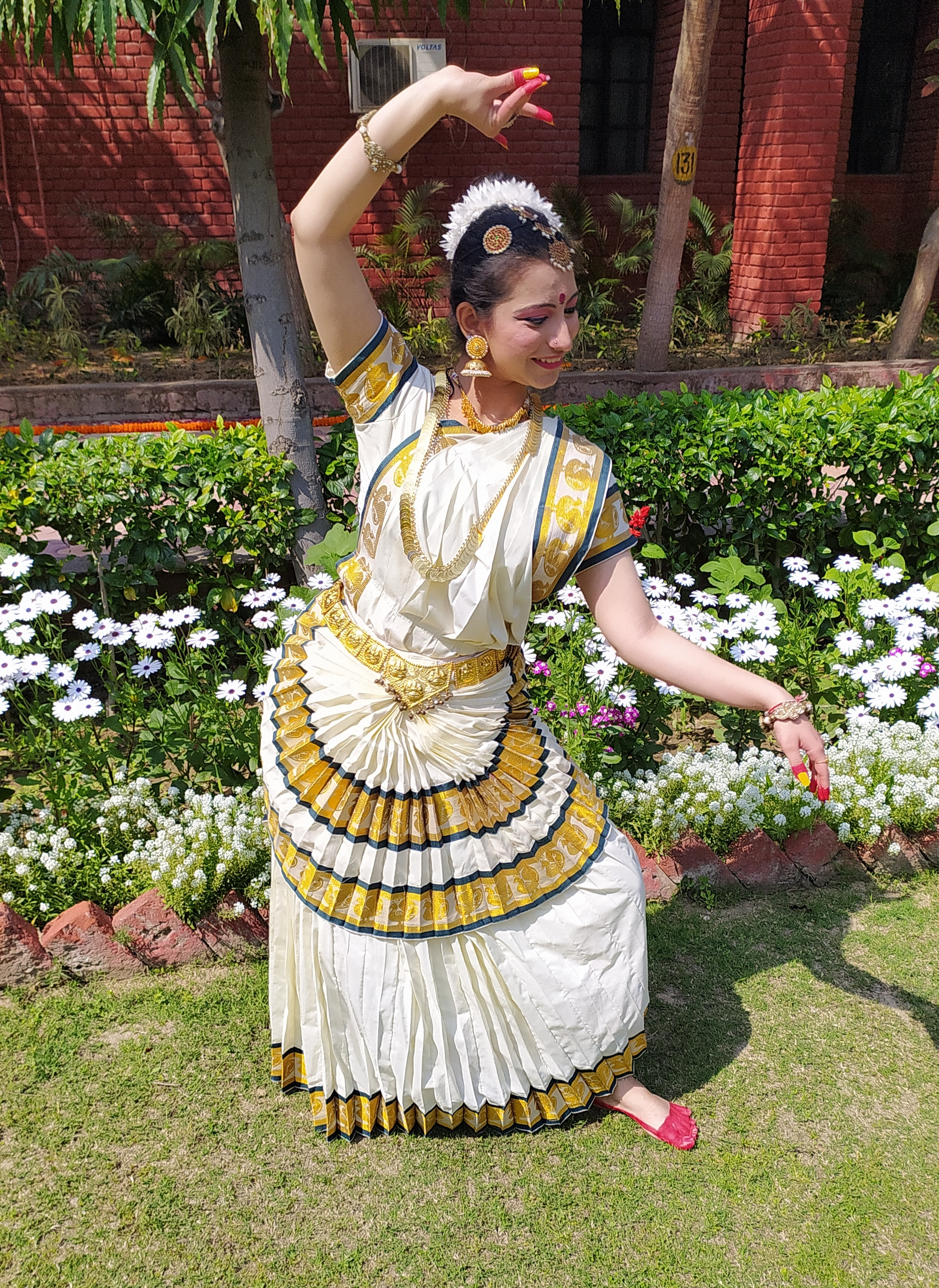
The Mohiniyattam of Kerala is an example of the Lasya dance

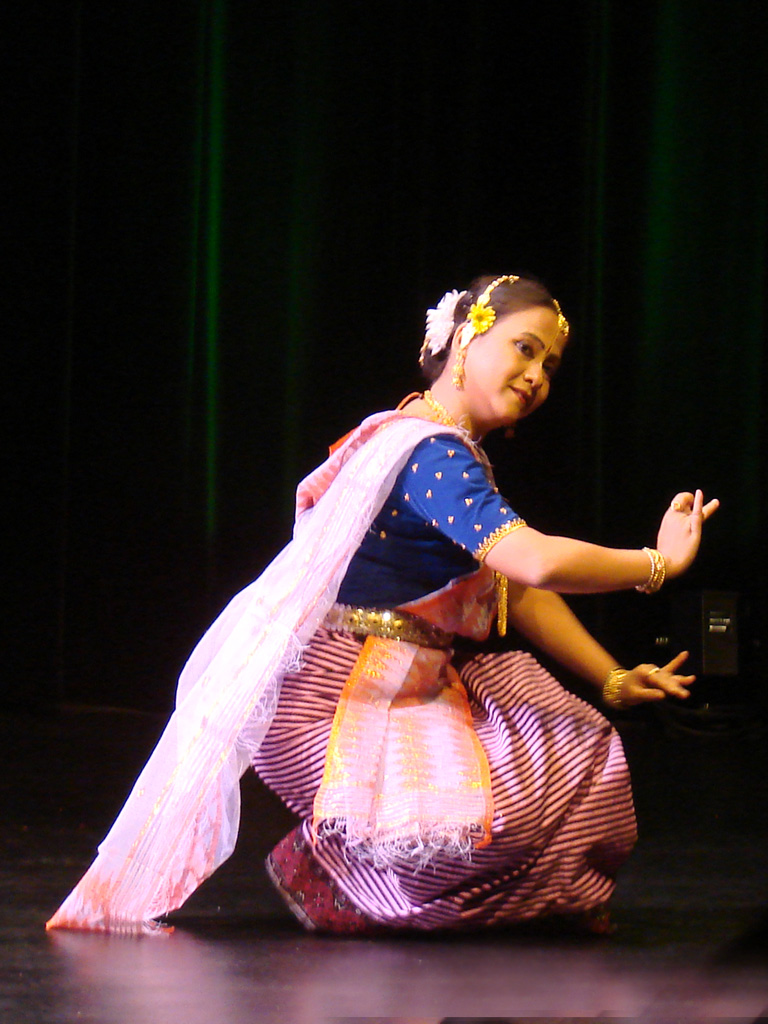
Nupi Challi Pareng (basic feminine movement) Lasya forms important part of Manipuri dance.

Lasya (Sanskrit: लास्य, romanized: Lāsya) is a female dance form that originated in India. In Hindu mythology, Lasya refers to the dance innovated and performed by the goddess Parvati, described to be gentle and graceful. Described in the Natya Shastra, the feminine Lasya danced by Parvati is contrasted by the masculine Tandava dance of her consort, Shiva.

== Etymology ==
The term lāsya is derived from the root ‘las’ meaning to play or to frolic. It is also translated as lively.

== Legend ==
According to legend, the Lasya was taught by Parvati to Usha, the daughter of Banasura. Usha, in turn, is regarded to have taught the dance to the milkmaids known as the gopikas, who are believed to have spread the technique to women throughout the land.

== Description ==
Described as the prototype of all female dancing, the Lasya is danced in a variety of forms, most of which comprise the small and seductive motions of the feet. Some forms of the Lasya consist of the rapid succession of minor steps, regarded to be erotic. During the performance of the dance, the feet are kept parallel and close to one another, each foot following the other with precision in time. An example of this dance is the Mohiniyattam of Kerala.

There are described to be four forms of the Lasya: Srinkhala, Lata, Pindi, and Bhedyaka.

Professor Inayat Khan in his book Munqar Musicar (1912) wrote: "Women and men both perform this dance and there are a number of recognized masters (ustad) of it in India. Lasya is accompanied by two sarangi players and a tabid, and sometimes a manjira (small Indian cymbals). It is danced by one woman, or by two together".
