= Tandava =

Divine dance performed by the Hindu god Shiva

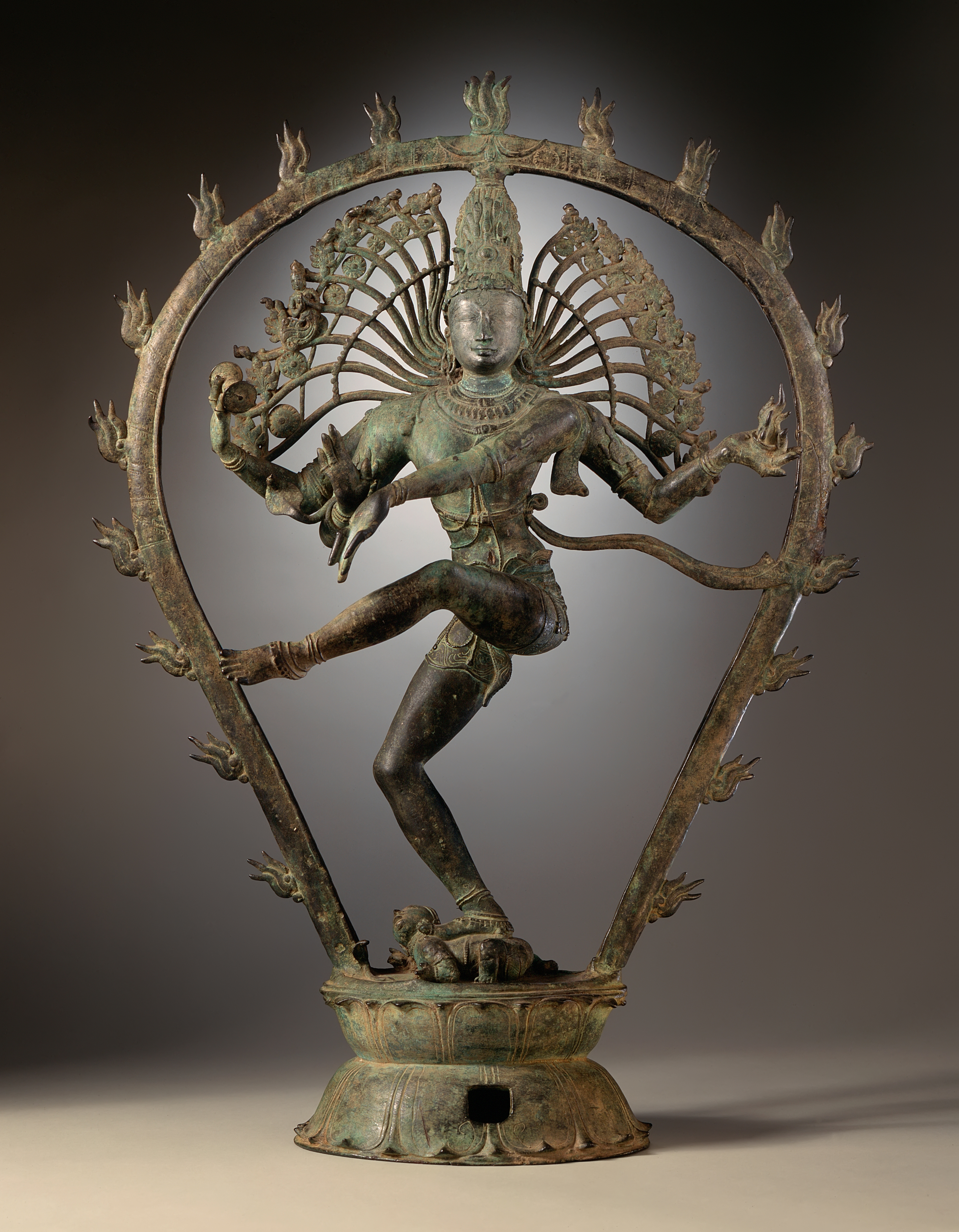
A Shiva Nataraja idol in Tamil Nadu, India

Tandavam (also spelled as Tāṇḍava), also known as Tāṇḍava Natyam, is a divine dance performed by Hindu god Shiva. Shiva is depicted as dancing the Tandava in his form of Nataraja.

The Natya Shastra, a Sanskrit treatise on the performing arts, describes various aspects of the Tandava.

== Description ==
Tandava refers both to Shiva's dance, the source of the cosmic cycle of creation, preservation, and dissolution, and the style of classical Indian dance-drama modeled upon it, characterized by vigorous, brisk movements.

The dance takes different names depending on the mood expressed or the specific activity of Shiva it portrays. For example, the Ananda Tandava expresses grace and symbolizes the five-fold cosmic cycle (pancakritya), from creation through dissolution to liberation, while Raudra Tandava is the posture Shiva assumes specifically during cosmic annihilation. Other types of Tandava found in Hindu texts include Tripura Tandava, Sandhya Tandava, Samhara Tandava, Kali (Kalika) Tandava, Uma Tandava, Shiva Tandava, Krishna Tandava, and Gauri Tandava.

In Shaiva Siddhanta tradition, Shiva as Nataraja (lit. "King of dance") is considered to be supreme lord of dance. In the non-dual Shaivite and Tantric traditions, Shiva's dance is interpreted both as a cosmic rhythm and as a "free and spontaneous mystical dance [that] takes place in the human heart."

Tandava takes its name from Tandu (taṇḍu), the attendant of Shiva, who instructed Bharata (author of the Natya Shastra) in the use of Angaharas and Karanas modes of the Tandava at Shiva's order. Some scholars consider that Tandu himself must have been the author of an earlier work on the dramatic arts, which was incorporated into the Natya Shastra. The Natya Shastra portrays Shiva narrating about the various aspects of the dance to the god Brahma.

The 32 Angaharas and 108 Karanas are discussed by Bharata in the 4th chapter of the Natya Shastra, Tandava Lakshanam. Karana is the combination of hand gestures with feet to form a dance posture. Angahara is composed of seven or more Karanas.

"How many various dances of Shiva are known to His worshipers I cannot say. No doubt the root idea behind all of these dances is more or less one and the same, the manifestation of primal rhythmic energy. Whatever the origins of Shiva's dance, it became in time the clearest image of the activity of God which any art or religion can boast of." - Ananda Coomaraswamy

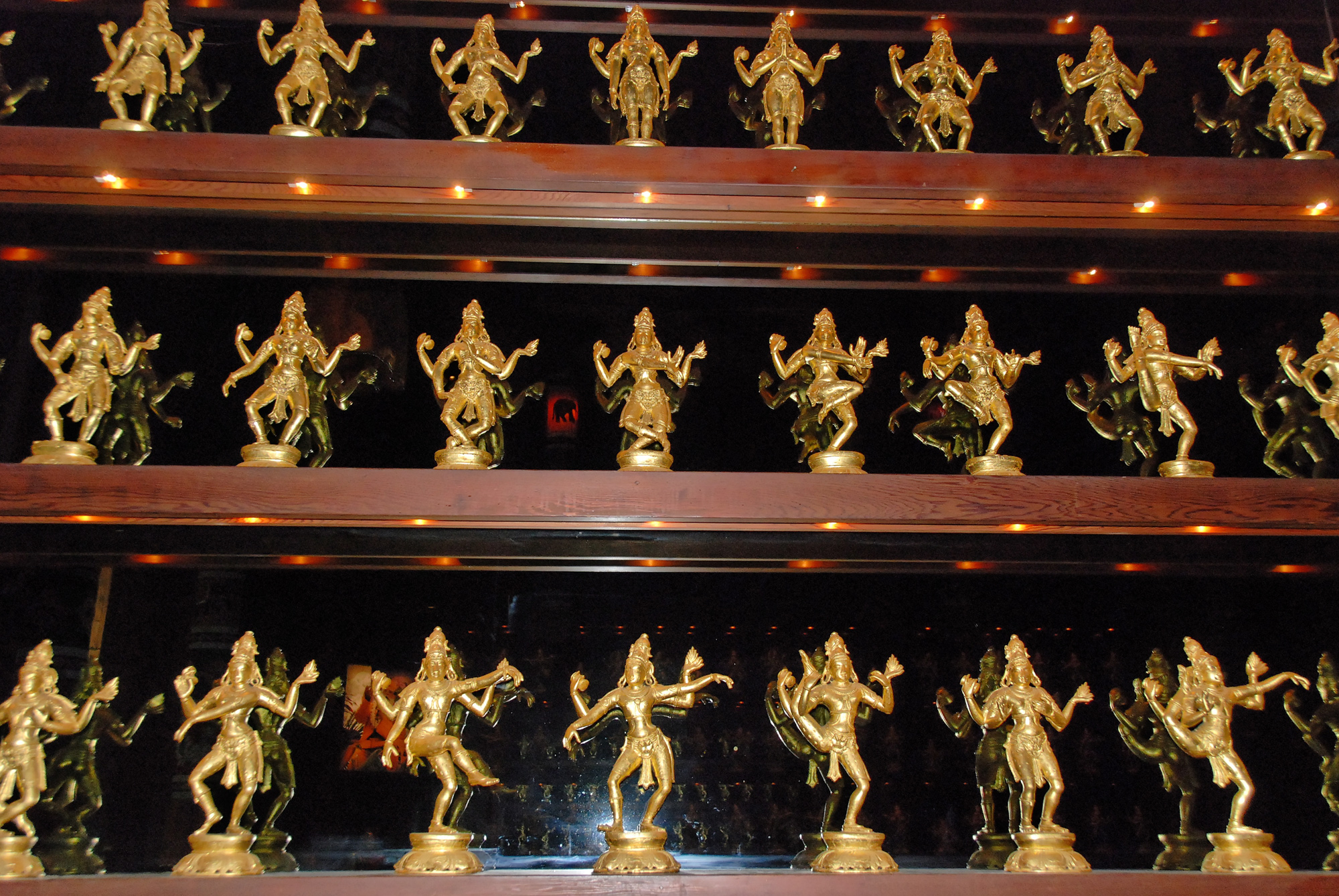
The 108 Karanas of Tandava depicted in Nataraja sculptures.

The dance is described as a pictorial allegory of the five principle manifestations of eternal energy:

- Srishti - creation, evolution
- Sthiti - preservation, support
- Samhara - destruction, evolution
- Tirodhana - illusion
- Anugraha - release, emancipation, grace

The dance performed by Shiva's wife Parvati in response to Shiva's Tandava is known as Lasya, in which the movements are gentle, graceful and sometimes erotic. Some scholars consider Lasya to be the feminine version of Tandava. There are two types of Lasya, Jarita Lasya and Yauvaka Lasya.

The Hindu scriptures narrate various occasions when Shiva performed the Tandava. When Sati (first wife of Shiva, who was reborn as Parvati) gave up her life in Daksha's sacrifice, Shiva is said to have performed the Rudra Tandava to express his grief and anger. The Shivapradosha stotra says when Shiva performs the Sandhya Tandava, the other gods like Brahma, Vishnu, Sarasvati, Lakshmi and Indra play musical instruments and sing Shiva's praises.

The Shiva Tandava Stotra is a stotra (Hindu hymn) that describes Shiva's power and beauty, believed to have been written by Ravana, a great devotee of Shiva.

== Association with other deities ==
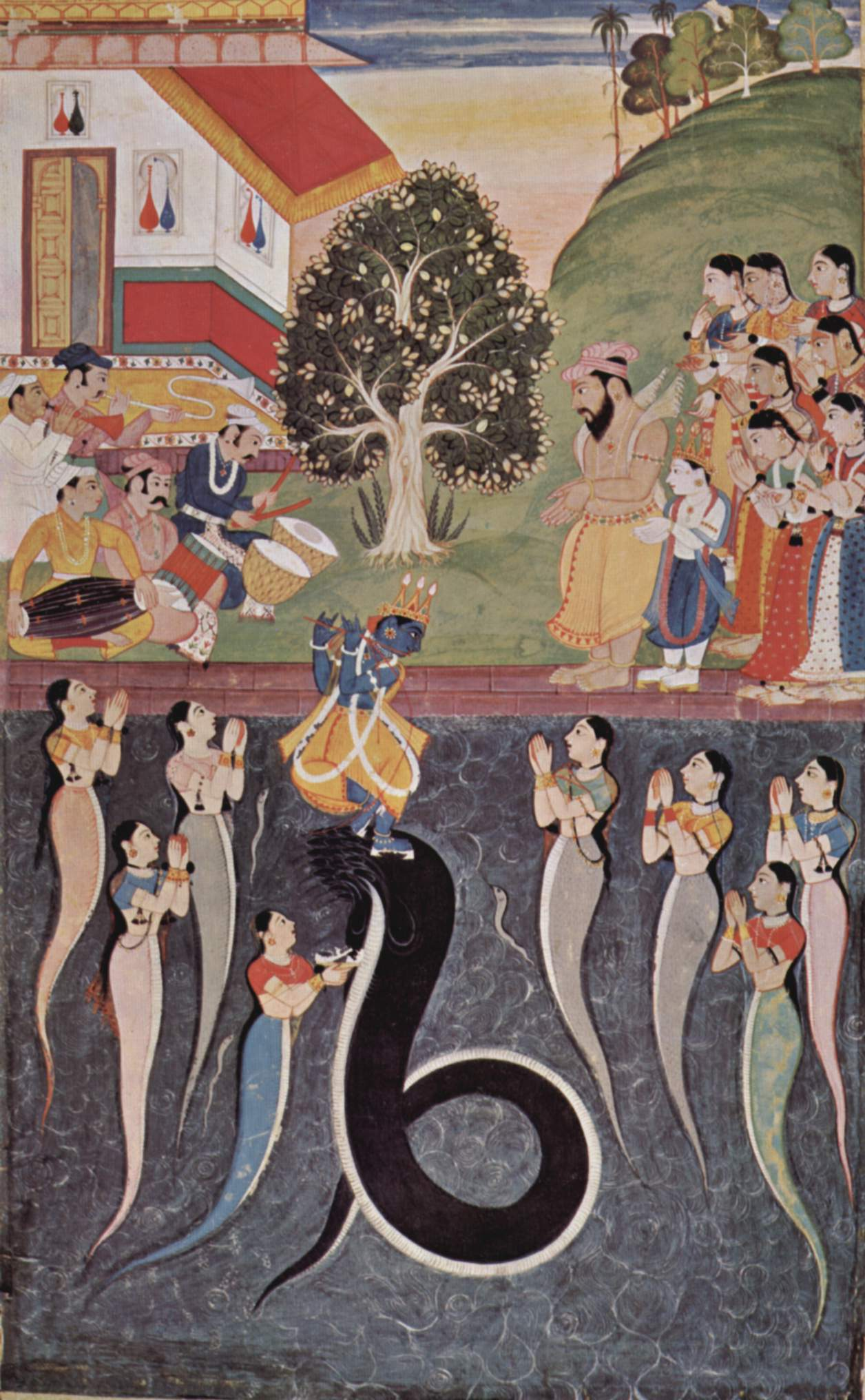
Krishna dancing over the subdued Kāliya and his wives Naginis asking Krishna for his mercy. From a Bhagavata Purana manuscript, c. 1640.

Ganesha, the son of Shiva, is depicted as Ashtabhuja tandavsa nritya murtis (Eight armed form of Ganesha dancing the Tandava) in temple sculptures.

The Bhagavata Purana talks of Krishna dancing his Tandava on the head of the serpent Kaliya. King Chikka Devaraja (the fourteenth maharaja of the Kingdom of Mysore) minted a series of gold coins called "Devaraja [with] the image of dancing Krishna" (tandava krishnamurti devaraja) to commemorate his coronation. Purandara Dasa calls the dancing Krishna ("Nritya Krishna") as "Tandava Krishna".

According to Jain traditions, Indra is said to have performed the Tandava in honour of Rishabha (Jain tirthankar) on the latter's birth.

The similarly correlated Buddhist deity Acala is shown in some depictions to trample upon Vighnarāja, a demon of obstacles, in the manner of Tandava.

== Indian classical dance ==
In Kathak dance three types of Tandavas are generally used, they are, Krishna Tandava, Shiva Tandava and Ravana Tandava, but sometimes a fourth variety - Kalika Tandava, is also often used. Bharatanatyam and Kuchipudi have variants of Krishna dancing his Tandava on Kaliya.

The Manipuri dance is categorized as either "Tandava" (vigorous, usually go with Shiva, Shakti or Krishna as warrior-savior themed plays) or lasya (delicate, usually go with love stories of Radha and Krishna). In the Krishna Tandava in Raslila performance of Manipuri dance is graceful yet with swift movement and acrobatic gestures.

== Sculpture ==
The 108 karanas of Tandava have inspired Shiva sculptures of the 1st-millennium BCE, particularly the Tandava style which fuses many of these into a composite image found at the Nataraja temple of Chidambaram.

Shiva as Nataraja or Krishna dancing the Tandava is a recurring theme in the Chola period bronzes. Various Shiva temples in South India depict the dancing Nataraja.

== Modern Reception ==
In the 20th century, following the publication of Ananda Coomaraswamy's 1918 work The Dance of Shiva, European and North American artists, writers, and collectors began to interpret the dancing Shiva as an allegory for world events. During and after World War II, the German author Hermann Hesse and art collector Eduard von der Heydt saw the dance as symbolizing a world facing imminent catastrophe, in contrast with a Western optimism about unbridled technological progress. In The Tao of Physics, physicist Fritjof Capra likened the form and rhythm of the Tandava to quantum field theory, describing the continuous creation and destruction of subatomic particles as an ongoing cosmic "energy dance." In 2004, a statue of Shiva as Nataraja was installed at CERN in Geneva in commemoration of India's research collaboration with the facility for the prior four decades.
